= 2018 Supreme Court of India crisis =

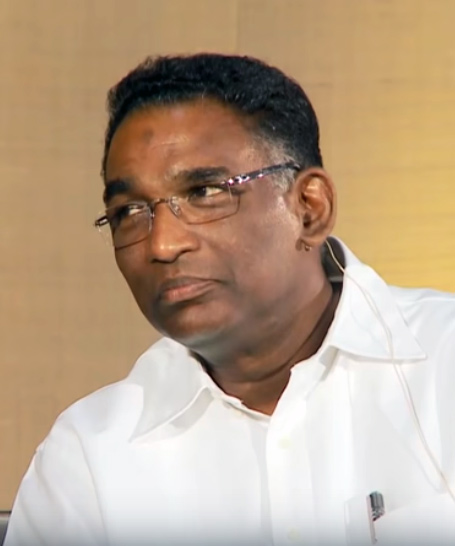
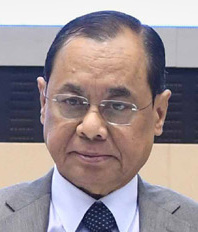
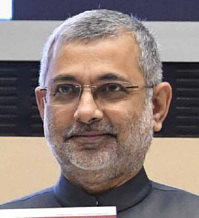
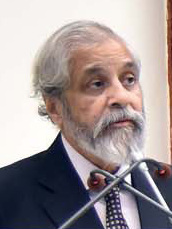
- Jasti Chelameswar (top left), Ranjan Gogoi (top right), Kurian Joseph (bottom left) and Madan Lokur (bottom right)
- Date: 12 January–23 April 2018 (Note: Dates are from day of press conference to rejection of the impeachment of Misra by Venkaiah Naidu)
- Cause: Criticism of the allocation of cases by Chief Justice Dipak Misra; Alleged loss of Supreme Court integrity
- Motive: Reforms to Supreme Court administration
- Participants: Jasti Chelameswar; Ranjan Gogoi; Kurian Joseph; Madan Lokur
- Outcome: Proposed impeachment of Dipak Misra; Changes to the Supreme Court roster

The 2018 Supreme Court of India crisis was a period of institutional crisis in the Judiciary of India, aggravated after a press conference criticising the Chief Justice of India (CJI) Dipak Misra was given on 12 January 2018 by the four most senior Supreme Court judges (after Misra): Jasti Chelameswar, Ranjan Gogoi, Madan Lokur, and Kurian Joseph. The press conference was the first such given by Supreme Court judges in the history of India.

Tensions within the Supreme Court emerged in 2017 over disagreements in the allocation and handling of cases. These issues came from cases involving a medical-college scam case in November 2017 and petitions calling for investigations into the death of judge B.H. Loya. The four judges raised their concerns with Misra in the months between November 2017 and the Loya case in January 2018, arguing that the established conventions on the composition of benches were not being followed. Attempts to resolve these disputes between the judges and Misra were unsuccessful.

On the day of the Loya hearing, the media were called to Chelameswar's residence in New Delhi. In the press conference, Chelameswar warned that democracy would "not survive" in the country unless the institution was "preserved", and asserted that their "efforts failed" in trying to convince Misra to take "remedial measures". The four judges alleged certain politically controversial cases were allocated to such benches which give favourable judgements towards a political party, and released a letter to the public which they had addressed to Misra months before outlining their concerns. Reaction to the conference was mixed, with some praising the judges for demonstrating transparency and accountability, while others criticised the impact the press conference would have on the public image of the Supreme Court.

Days after the press conference, Misra released a list of seven important cases to be heard by constitution benches which excluded all four of the judges who spoke against him. In April, an opposition-led motion in the Rajya Sabha to impeach Misra received 64 signatures by MPs but was rejected by Venkaiah Naidu. The crisis led to speculation as to whether Misra would recommend Gogoi as his successor, but he did so in September 2018. In August 2020, a Supreme Court bench stated that they hoped it was the "first and the last" time judges would go to the press.

== Background ==
Dipak Misra became the 45th Chief Justice of India in August 2017. The Supreme Court collegium by January 2018 consisted of Misra, along with the four next most-senior judges — Jasti Chelameswar, Ranjan Gogoi, Madan Lokur, and Kurian Joseph. Chelameswar was appointed to the Supreme Court on 10 October 2011, while Gogoi was appointed on 23 April 2012. Lokur became a Supreme Court judge on 4 June 2012, and Joseph was appointed on 8 March 2013.

Politically charged cases that came before the Supreme Court were traditionally overseen by the most senior judges of the court.

== Prelude (2017–2018) ==
=== Medical college scam case ===
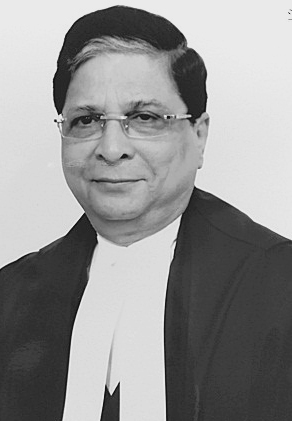
Chief Justice Dipak Misra (pictured) asserted that he was the "master of the roster".

The Medical Council of India and Union Ministry of Health barred 46 private medical colleges from admitting students in 2017 due to alleged irregularities. One of these included the Prasad Institute of Medical Sciences, run by the Prasad Education Trust. Former judge I. M. Quddusi was allegedly approached to help orchestrate a multi-crore plot to achieve a favourable order from the Supreme Court to help settle debarment of the college. Quddusi was arrested along with five others in September 2017 by the Central Bureau of Investigation (CBI).

A petition was filed by a legal reform group seeking the setting up of an independent probe by a Special Investigation Team (SIT) headed by a retired Chief Justice of India (CJI). The petition suggested the probe was needed as there was an alleged attempt to bribe Supreme Court judges. Other issues raised by the petitioners included the possibility of bias if Misra or other judges considered a case where they had a possible connection; Misra, Amitava Roy and A.M. Khanwilkar previously heard a plea filed by the trust in August 2017. Jasti Chelameswar, the most senior-judge after Misra, admitted the petition on 8 November but Misra reportedly overturned the decision, and the case was instead allocated to a bench consisting of Arjan Kumar Sikri and Ashok Bhushan.

On 9 November, a new petition in the case was filed by Kamini Jaiswal with Chelameswar. He noted its "disturbing" allegations and ordered a hearing by a constitution bench for 13 November. Chelameswar gave the order despite being delivered a note from Misra during the proceedings, which asked him not to make a decision in the case. On 10 November, a bench led by Misra annulled Chelameswar's order, with Misra telling the court that he as the chief justice was the master of the roster and had the power to decide the schedule and roster of the court. The case was later referred to a bench headed by Rajesh Kumar Agrawal, and dismissed on 1 December with the petitioners being fined ₹25 lakh (US$26,000).

=== Loya case allocation ===
Special CBI Judge B.H. Loya was presiding over Sohrabuddin encounter case when he died in 2014. BJP President Amit Shah, who was then the state home minister of Gujarat, and Rohith Shah were accused in the case. Around two weeks after Loya's death, the judge who replaced him in the case discharged Shah and ruled out the trial. In November 2017, the Caravan reported that Loya's family raised doubts over the circumstances of his death, and called for an inquiry. Members of his family alleged that he was offered a ₹100 crore (US$10 million) to rule in favour of Shah days before his death. Medical records showed that Loya died of a cardiac arrest.

On 10 January 2018, the Bombay High Court admitted a petition seeking a probe into Loya's death, which was set for 23 January. However, the Supreme Court intervened on 12 January and heard two similar petitions, listed to be heard in court 10. The bench comprised Arun Kumar Mishra and Mohan Shantanagoudar, who were 10th and 22nd in seniority respectively out of the 25 Supreme Court judges.

== Press conference (January 2018) ==
=== Misra meeting and lead-up ===
On 12 January 2018, Chelameswar, Ranjan Gogoi, Madan Lokur and Kurian Joseph met with Chief Justice of India (CJI) Misra and requested for the Loya case, which was alleged to be politically sensitive, to be shifted away from the court of Arun Kumar Mishra to a more senior court. Misra refused the request of the judges. After finishing their work, the media was called to Chelameswar's residence in New Delhi at noon of the same day for a press conference.

=== Issues raised by the judges ===
In the press conference, Chelameswar said "we tried to collectively persuade the chief justice that certain things are not in order and therefore you should take remedial measures....Unfortunately, our efforts failed." He also said "that unless this institution is preserved and it maintains its equanimity, democracy will not survive in this country." Gogoi, responding to queries over the morning meeting with Misra, stated that "it was the issue of an assignment of a case", and went on to say that "since all our efforts to convince the CJI that an appropriate decision has to be taken failed, we had no other option but to communicate it to the nation". When asked whether he wanted Misra impeached, Chelameswar said "let the nation decide".

The Times of India reported that the judges listed five main complaints they alleged was wrong with the Supreme Court under Misra's tenure as CJI:

1. The allocation of important cases to CJI-led benches and not to other senior judge-headed benches
2. Cases that had significant consequences for the judiciary and country were assigned by Misra based on preference rather than rationality
3. The Loya case was not allocated to any of their four benches
4. The allocation of the medical college admissions scam to a more junior bench after Chelameswar was overruled by Misra
5. Misra heading a smaller bench on the memorandum of procedure when it was heard previously by a five-judge bench

Also on 12 January, the judges made public a letter which they had sent Misra two months ago (with no specified date) but received no response to. In the letter, the four judges stated that there were "instances where cases having far-reaching consequences for the nation and the institution had been assigned by the chief justice of this court selectively to the benches ‘of their preference’ without any rationale for this assignment. This must be guarded against at all costs."

Chelameswar finished the conference by stating "we don't want wise men saying 20 years from now that justice Chelameswar, [Ranjan] Gogoi, [Madan B] Lokur and Kurian Joseph sold their souls and didn't do the right thing by our constitution."

=== Analysis ===
Chelameswar described the press conference as an "extraordinary event in the history of any nation, and of this institution, the judiciary". The press conference was the first such instance in the history of the country.

== Reaction ==
=== Political figures ===
- Prime Minister Narendra Modi called for government and political parties to stay out of the crisis, stating that he had "faith" in the justice system and claimed that they would "definitely figure out a solution".
- Indian National Congress (INC) president Rahul Gandhi stated that the points were "extremely important" that "must be looked into carefully".
- West Bengal Chief Minister Mamata Banerjee said that citizens were "deeply anguished" and that central government interference in the judiciary was "dangerous for democracy."
- Yogendra Yadav called for people to "stand with independent judges".
- Bharatiya Janata Party (BJP) politician Subramanian Swamy called for the four judges to not be criticised, and instead "respected".

=== Legal community ===
- Attorney General K. K. Venugopal said that the event "could have been avoided", and called for the judges to show "statesmanship" to ensure "complete harmony".
- Former Chief Justice of India (CJI) K. G. Balakrishnan argued that the judges should have settled their differences among themselves rather than going public.
- Former CJI Rajendra Mal Lodha said that the judiciary's image was "dented and would take a long time to repair". He also said the "grievances" of the four judges were "not addressed" which is "why they did this".
- Former Supreme Court judge RS Sodhi called for the impeachment of the four judges. Senior advocate K. T. S. Tulsi described the conference as "shocking".
- Former Supreme Court judge and Solicitor General N. Santosh Hegde said that he was "devastated" and that the press conference had caused "irreparable" damage to the institution.
- Former Attorney General Soli Sorabjee said that it would have "serious repercussions for the public image of the judiciary and the Indian Constitution".
- Senior advocate Indira Jaising described the press conference as "historic", and praised the judges for "having coming out and been accountable to the nation", but said that they did not go "far enough".

=== Public opinion ===
Public opinion on the press conference was divided. Some supported the decision of the judges, while others criticised them for taking their concerns to the media.

== Aftermath (January–April 2018) ==
=== Immediate aftermath and Loya case ===
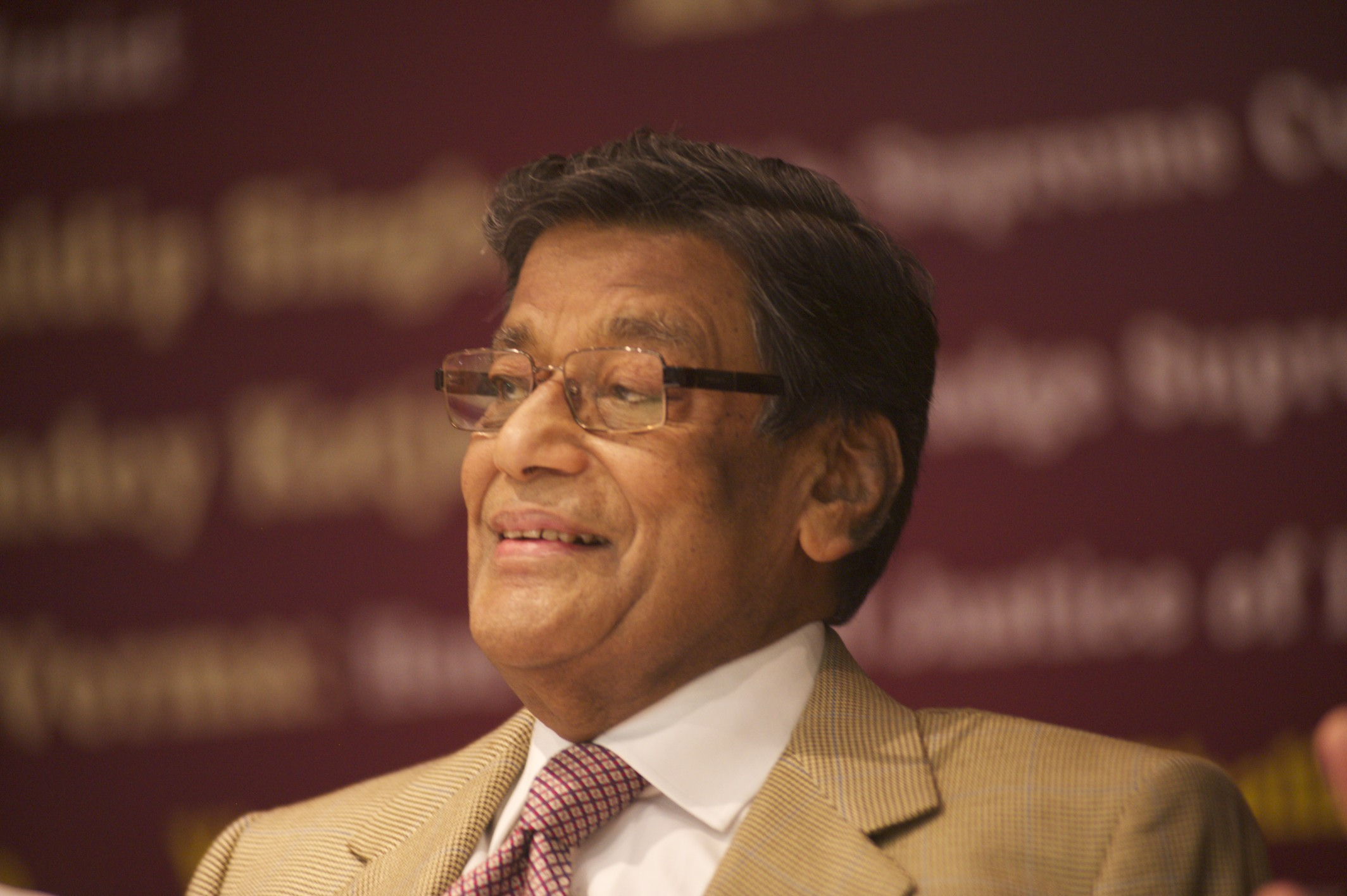
Attorney General, K. K. Venugopal (pictured) said that "everything" had been "settled" between the judges.

Following the press conference, on 15 January, Misra met with the four judges informally in a meeting over tea. The Attorney General, K. K. Venugopal, subsequently said that "everything" had been "settled", and that the courts were "functioning". The Bar Council of India also state that its members had met with 15 Supreme Court judges and were assured that the crisis had been "resolved". On the same day, Arun Kumar Mishra reportedly became emotional while in the informal morning gathering at the judges' lounge. Mishra reportedly felt that he had been "unfairly" targeted by the four judges, but was comforted by Chelameswar who expressed that they were not trying to criticise him but rather raise issues. The following day, on 16 January, the bench headed by Mishra ruled that the case should be put before an "appropriate bench".

A bench headed by Misra, and consisting of A. M. Khanwilkar and Dhanajaya Y. Chandrachud, was subsequently allocated to hear the case. On 19 April, the bench ruled that Loya had died of a natural cardiac arrest and rejected the petitions seeking an independent investigation into the death of Loya. Following the verdict, Rahul Gandhi said that most Indians "instinctively" understood the truth about Amit Shah, and said that the truth "had its own way of catching up on people like him".

=== Changes to the roster ===
On 16 January, shortly after the press conference, Misra released a list of seven important cases to be heard by constitution benches, in which all four judges who spoke against him were excluded from. The constitution bench, which was formed earlier to hear a matter on the validity of aadhaar, consisted of five judges: Misra, Arjun Kumar Sikri, Ashok Bhushan, A. M. Khanwilkar and Dhanajaya Y. Chandrachud. The seven other important cases that the bench was assigned were a case on taxation, entry of women to Sabarimala, a consumer law case, the right of Parsi women to enter the fire temple if they marry outside the community, a challenge to the Indian Penal Code (IPC) provision that only men can be charged for adultery, the challenge to Section 377, and a petition of whether politicians facing criminal charges should be disqualified from elections. The same combination of judges had heard various constitutional issues since 10 October 2017, including on euthanasia and issues of jurisdiction between the central government and the Delhi government.

On 1 February, Misra updated the roster, which the changes coming into effect on 5 February. He allocated himself public interest petitions, while Chelameswar was given cases related to indirect taxes, labour, consumer protection and criminal cases. Gogoi was allocated crime, labour, indirect tax, personal law and religion cases, and Lokur was given ecology, mines and minerals, consumer protection, armed forces and paramilitary forces, and personal law. Joseph was allocated crime, labour and family law issues.

=== Proposed impeachment of Misra ===
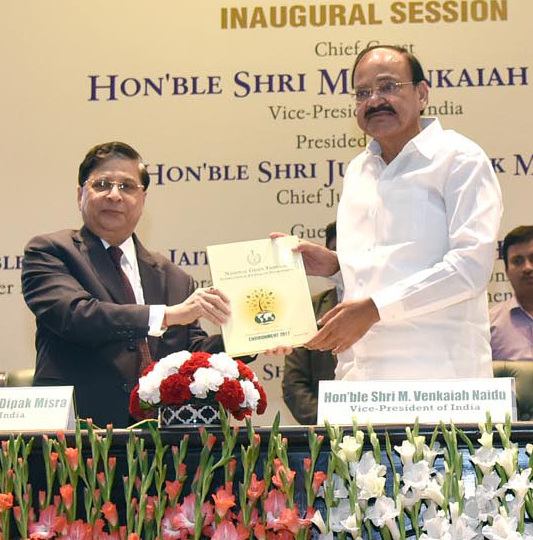
Vice President Venkaiah Naidu (right) rejected the impeachment motion against Misra (left).

The day after the outcome of the Loya case, on 20 April 2018, seven opposition parties in the Rajya Sabha submitted a petition to the Vice President Venkaiah Naidu seeking impeachment of Misra. This marked the first time that any such motion had been moved against a Chief Justice of India. The same day, a bench composed of Arjun Kumar Sikri and Ashok Bhushan described the public statements of impeachment made by lawmakers and politicians as "unfortunate", and said that they were "all very disturbed about it".

The seven parties were: Indian National Congress, Nationalist Congress Party, Bahujan Samaj Party, Communist Party of India, Communist Party of India (Marxist), Indian Union Muslim League, and the Samajwadi Party. Nominated member K.T.S. Tulsi also signed the petition. The Leader of the Opposition, Ghulam Nabi Azad, stated that the timing of the impeachment motion was unrelated to the Loya verdict.

There were 5 alleged charges against Misra in the impeachment motion (summarised and listed below):

1. Facts and circumstances in the medical college scam case suggested that Misra may have been involved in some of the conspiracy, which warranted investigation.
2. That he dealt with a petition which he likely fell under the scope of, violating the first principle of the code of conduct for judges.
3. He appeared to have antedated an administrative order on 6 November 2017, which amounted to serious forgery or fabrication.
4. That Misra acquired land as an advocate by giving an affidavit found to be false which was only surrendered in 2012.
5. Misra abused his authority as master of the roster in politically sensitive cases to achieve a predetermined outcome.

There were originally signatures from 71 parliamentarians, but 7 had since retired when the petition was submitted, leaving the total at 64 which met the required threshold of 50 Rajya Sabha MPs to submit the motion. Former prime minister Manmohan Singh and former finance minister P. Chidambaram were not signatories. 19 MPs who had signed the motion were reported in the media, including D.P. Tripathi who was one of the MPs who had retired before the list was submitted.

Reported signatories calling for Dipak Misra's impeachment (19)
- Ghulam Nabi Azad
- Kapil Sibal
- Anand Sharma
- Ahmed Patel
- A. K. Antony
- Motilal Vora
- Ambika Soni
- Jairam Ramesh
- Abhishek Singhvi
- Sharad Pawar
- Praful Patel
- Majeed Memon
- D. P. Tripathi (retired)
- Ram Gopal Yadav
- Neeraj Shekhar
- Satish Chandra Misra
- D. Raja
- P. V. Abdul Wahab
- K. T. S. Tulsi

On 23 April 2018, the petition was rejected by Venkaiah Naidu in a 10-page order. Naidu met with Attorney General K. K. Venugopal, former secretary generals of the Lok Sabha and other legal experts and based his decision from the consultations he held. In the order, Naidu said that MPs "unsure of their own cause", and that phrases used indicated "mere suspicion, a conjecture or an assumption" which did not satisfy the proof beyond reasonable doubt criteria needed make a case for proved misbehaviour under Article 124. The order alleged that the allegations in the impeachment motion had a "serious tendency of undermining the judiciary" of India, and also that there was "virtually no concrete viable imputation" in evidence to proceed further.

== Later impact under Misra (April–October 2018) ==
=== Role and powers of the Chief Justice ===
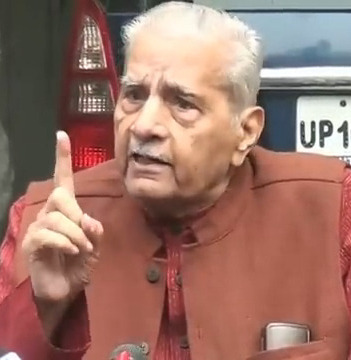
Former law minister Shanti Bhushan (pictured) filed a petition calling for a panel of senior judges to decide the roster.

A petition was filed advocate by Asok Pande which argued that "unfettered power was being exercised by the Chief Justices in the matter of formation of benches" and called for the way in which cases are assigned to be changed. A bench of Misra, Khanwilkar and Chandrachud rejected the petition on 11 April. Chandrachud, writing for the bench, stated that "the Chief Justice of India is first among equals and has the authority to decide allocation of cases and setting up of benches". The order also stated that as the CJI was a high constitutional functionary, there could not be "any distrust about the responsibilities he discharges", and described the petition as "scandalous".

In April, former law minister Shanti Bhushan filed a petition which argued that Misra had "placed matters of general public importance and/or political sensitivity before only certain benches", and called for a panel of senior judges to decide the roster. On 6 July, a bench of Sikri and Ashok Bhushan for the third time (following the previous November and April cases) ruled that the CJI was the master of the roster, and they added that he was "empowered to exercise leadership in administration of the court which includes assignment of cases". The bench stated that there "was no dispute that Chief Justice is the Master of Roster".

=== Ranjan Gogoi recommendation ===
In the months leading up to Misra's retirement, there was speculation as to whether he would recommend Gogoi as his successor due to Gogoi's involvement in the press conference. Under convention, the Chief Justice recommends the name of their successor a month before they are due to retire. This convention was broken in the recent years before the crisis, with S. H. Kapadia delaying the recommendation of his successor Altamas Kabir. Kabir then did the same with his successor P. Sathasivam, but Sathasivam then restored the convention in recommending Rajendra Mal Lodha exactly a month before his retirement.

Amit Shah increased speculation over the appointment of Gogoi by stating that the government would follow "what the chief justice recommends". On 18 June, the law minister, Ravi Shankar Prasad, stated in a press conference that "there was no reason to doubt the intention of the government. There is a convention in place and let CJI forward the name of his successor and then the government would discuss on it."

On 4 September, Misra followed the convention (as 2 September and 3 September were public holidays) and, a month before his retirement, recommended Gogoi as the next Chief Justice to the president of India, Ram Nath Kovind. In his letter to Prasad, Misra wrote "I recommend Justice Gogoi as my successor to the post of Chief Justice of India". On 26 September, a bench of Chief Justice Misra, A. M. Khanwilkar, and Chandrachud dismissed the plea which challenged Gogoi's appointment as Chief Justice over his role in the crisis. Gogoi was sworn in as Chief Justice on 3 October.

== Legacy ==
=== Commentary on the crisis by judges ===
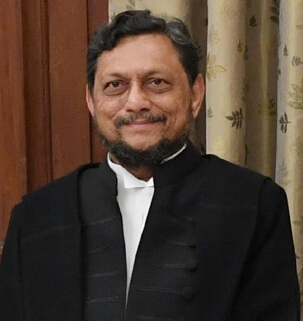
Sharad Arvind Bobde (pictured) said the crisis was "one of the most unfortunate events in the history of the Supreme Court".

After Chelameswar retired, he stated that the "press conference has not achieved in the complete sense the result it should have, but it certainly has created awareness in this country that this institution is also required to be protected and its activities should be assessed periodically. That awareness is certainly there today". Following his retirement, Joseph argued that "you cannot say that the issues have been completely addressed. It will take some time for the systems to change. Changes were brought in by the previous Chief Justice of India [Misra] and the present CJI [Gogoi] is carrying it forward. Process of change will take time".

In 2023, former Chief Justice Sharad Bobde, who was a sitting judge at the time of the crisis, stated that the press conference was "one of the most unfortunate events in the history of the Supreme Court. He also stated "I tried my best to prevent it", and that he would not have done himself.

=== Judicial impact ===
Gogoi's collegium consisted of Arjun Kumar Sikri (until his retirement on 3 March 2019), Sharad Arvind Bobde, N.V. Ramana, and Arun Kumar Mishra; Rohinton Fali Nariman joined the collegium following the retirement of Sikri. As Chief Justice, Gogoi started interacting with other senior judges in matters relating to the running of the courts.

In August 2020, a verdict by a three-judge bench headed by Arun Mishra, stated "we hope it was the first and the last occasion that the judges have gone to press, and God gives wisdom to protect its dignity by internal mechanism, particularly, when allegations made, if any, publicly cannot be met by sufferer judges. It would cause suffering to them till eternity."

== See also ==
- Judiciary of India
- Issues in the judiciary of India
