= Issues in the judiciary of India =

The Indian judiciary suffers from several systemic deficiencies and faces several operational and administrative challenges. In January 2025, a report by the International Commission of Jurists noted that the Indian judiciary is under heavy strain due to deficiencies in governance, irregularities in the appointment of judges, and improper interference and influence by political actors. Backlog and delays in the delivery of justice are considered the most critical issues to be addressed for India's economic growth.

== Persistent issues ==
=== Arbitrary appointment of judges ===
Under Article 124 of the Constitution of India, judges of the Supreme Court of India are appointed by the President of India “after consultation with such of the Judges of the Supreme Court and of the High Courts in the States as the President may deem necessary for that purpose.” The Article was amended by the 99th Amendment to the Constitution of India in 2014, which placed the responsibility for appointments on the president, subject to recommendations of the National Judicial Appointments Commission. However, the amendment was struck down by the Supreme Court as unconstitutional and void in October 2015 in Supreme Court Advocates-on-Record Association v. Union of India, holding that the amendment affected the independence of the judiciary, an essential part of the Basic structure of the Constitution.

At present, the appointment of judges in the Supreme Court and High Courts is made through the collegium system, which has been widely condemned for being nepotistic, casteist, and opaque. The collegium system, which is not mentioned anywhere in the Constitution, effectively lets the Supreme Court appoint its own judges.

=== Arbitrary listing of cases ===
The allocation of benches and cases in constitutional courts in India. However, while internal administration pertaining to cases is based on predetermined rules and procedures, it is also subject to the discretionary power of the Chief Justice of India. There have been several instances of arbitrary exercise of powers by Chief Justices. In July 2026, a working group on access to medicines wrote to the Chief Justice of India requesting to expedite a hearing of a case of a cancer patient that was listed 57 times and remained unheard. In contrast, at a midnight hearing in 2023, the Supreme Court of India quashed an order of the Gujarat High Court which directed social activist Teesta Setalvad to immediately surrender. Similarly, the hearing for a final plea to delay the execution of Yakoub Memon, a convicted terrorist, started at 3:16 am on 30 July 2015, hours before his hanging.

=== Pendency and delays ===
According to the National Judicial Data Grid, lower courts in India have over 49.8 million pending cases, and the High Courts have over 6.46 million pending cases. There are over 10,000 pending cases in the Supreme Court of India that are more than 10 years old, and over 80,000 cases in High Courts across the country that are over three decades old.

=== Lack of accountability ===
The Indian judiciary could be made accountable through an impeachment motion in the Parliament or through an in-house administrative procedure headed by the Chief Justice of India (without any statutory or constitutional basis). Scholars have claimed that, aside from impeachment, judicial accountability mechanisms in India are insular and ineffective, making real accountability nearly impossible.

=== Post retirement employment of judges ===
Many judges in India pursue careers in government-appointed roles after retirement. In 2020, retired Chief Justice of India, Ranjan Gogoi, was nominated to be a member of the Rajya Sabha by former President Ram Nath Kovind. In several other instances, governments have appointed judges to lucrative positions post-retirement, and the issue has been flagged as a potential source of bias. Former Chief Justice P. Sathasivam was appointed as the Governor of Kerala, within a few months of his retirement.

Post-retirement appointments, particularly the ones deemed lucrative, have been criticised as 'selling out' of judges who deliver decisions favourable to the government; even when judges have been impartial, the criticism has been that such appointments invite misgivings about judicial integrity and independence. It has also been argued that re-employment of judges by the executive, violates, in spirit, the doctrine of Separation of powers. A 2021 analysis by ThePrint found that 71% retired judges of the Supreme Court—73 out of 103—were working in government jobs and at least 60% of these positions involved direct appointment by the government. Several reforms have been suggested, including an outright ban and a cooling-off period. The first Law Commission of India had unanimously expressed the view that it was undesirable for judges to accept employment under the government as it could affect judicial independence.

== Reform efforts ==
=== Government ===
The Government of India has implemented several initiatives to reform the judiciary. These include the establishment of the National Judicial Data Grid, digitisation of court records, and hiring more judges.

The government has attempted to establish a National Judicial Appointments Commission to address several issues with the collegium system. However, the 99th Constitutional amendment was struck down by the Supreme Court of India in October 2015.

=== Civil society ===
Several civic groups, particularly Vidhi Centre for Legal Policy and Daksh have done a considerable amount of research and advocacy on issues related to judicial reforms in India.

== See also ==
- Judiciary of India
- Judicial corruption in India
- Supreme Court of India
- High courts of India
- Pendency of court cases in India
