= R. Poornima =

The Honourable R. Poornima

Judge of the Madras High Court
- Incumbent
- Assumed office 23 September 2024
- Appointed by: Droupadi Murmu

Personal details
- Occupation: Judge

R. Poornima is an Indian judge. She is currently serving as a judge of the Madras High Court. Poornima holds a bachelor's degree in Commerce (B.Com.) and a Bachelor of Laws (LL.B.). Following her legal studies, she began her career as a District Judge in Perambalur district in 2011. After serving as a Registrar at the Madras High Court, she served as the District Judge of Villupuram district. Subsequently, based on the recommendation of the Collegium, the President of India appointed her as a judge of the Madras High Court on September 10, 2024. She assumed office on September 23, 2024.
