= National Judicial Appointments Commission =

Failed proposal for an Indian legal body

National Judicial Appointments Commission, 2014

Parliament of India
- Long title: An Act further to amend the Constitution of India.
- Citation: 99th Constitutional Amendment Act
- Territorial extent: India
- Assented to: 15 August 2014
- Commenced: 31 December 2014
- Repealed: 16 October 2015

Struck down by
- Supreme Court of India
- Status: Struck down

The National Judicial Appointments Commission (NJAC) was a proposed body which would have been responsible for the recruitment, appointment and transfer of judicial officers, legal officers and legal employees under the government of India and in all state governments of India. The commission was established by amending the Constitution of India through the 99th constitution amendment with the Constitution (Ninety-Ninth Amendment) Act, 2014 or 99th Constitutional Amendment Act-2014 passed by the Lok Sabha on 13 August 2014 and by the Rajya Sabha on 14 August 2014. The NJAC would have replaced the collegium system for the appointment of judges as invoked by the Supreme Court via judicial fiat by a new system. Along with the Constitution Amendment Act, the National Judicial Appointments Commission Act, 2014, was also passed by the Parliament of India to regulate the functions of the National Judicial Appointments Commission. The NJAC Bill and the Constitutional Amendment Bill, was ratified by 16 of the state legislatures in India, and subsequently assented by the President of India Pranab Mukherjee on 31 December 2014. The NJAC Act and the Constitutional Amendment Act came into force from 13 April 2015.

On 16 October 2015, the Constitution Bench of Supreme Court by a 4:1 majority upheld the collegium system and struck down the NJAC as unconstitutional after hearing the petitions filed by several persons and bodies with Supreme Court Advocates on Record Association (SCAoRA) being the first and lead petitioner. Justices J. S. Khehar, Madan Lokur, Kurian Joseph and Adarsh Kumar Goel had declared the 99th Amendment and NJAC Act unconstitutional while Justice Jasti Chelameswar upheld it.

== Constitution of NJAC ==
A new article, Article 124A, (which provides for the composition of the NJAC) has been inserted into the Constitution.

=== Composition ===
As per the amended provisions of the constitution, the Commission would have consisted of the following six persons:

- Chief Justice of India (Chairperson, ex officio)
- Two other of senior judges of the Supreme Court next to the Chief Justice of India - ex officio
- The Central Minister of Law and Justice, ex-officio
- Two eminent persons

These (two) eminent persons would have been nominated by a committee consisting of the

- Chief Justice of India,
- Prime Minister of India, and
- Leader of Opposition in the Lok Sabha (or where there is no such Leader of Opposition, then, the Leader of single largest Opposition Party in Lok Sabha), provided that of the two eminent persons, one person would be from the Scheduled Castes or Scheduled Tribes or OBC or minority communities or a woman. The eminent persons shall be nominated for a period of three years and shall not be eligible for re-nomination.

== Promotional Hierarchy ==
=== All India Judicial Service ===
The All India Judicial Service Officers are group 'A' gazetted officers. The promotional hierarchy of All India Judicial Service officers is mentioned below (Bottom to Top)

- Chief Justice of Supreme Court of India
- Justice of Supreme Court of India/Chief Justice of State High Court/Chairperson of Any Tribunal/Chairperson of any Commission/Chairperson of Lokpal/Chairperson of Lokayukta /Any other judiciary related designation to be included
- Additional Justice of Supreme Court of India/Justice of State High Court/Deputy Chairperson of Any Tribunal/Vice Chairperson of any Commission/Vice Chairperson of Lokpal/Vice Chairperson of Lokayukta /Any other judiciary related designation to be included
- Additional Justice of State High Court/Member of Any Tribunal/Member of Any Commission/Member of Lokpal/Member of Lokayukta/Any other judiciary related designation to be included
- Principal District & Session Judge/Principal Judge of Family Court/Any other judiciary related designation to be included
- Additional District and Session Judge/Additional Judicial Commissioner/Judge of Family Court/Any other judiciary related designation to be included
- Chief Judicial Magistrate cum Sub-Judge/Chief Metropolitan Magistrate/Any other judiciary related designation to be included
- Additional Chief Judicial Magistrate cum Sub-Judge/Chief Metropolitan Magistrate/Civil Judge/Any other judiciary related designation to be included
- Judicial Magistrate 1st Class cum Munsif Judge/Metropolitan Magistrate /Additional Civil Judge/Any other judiciary related designation to be included
- Judicial Magistrate 2nd Class cum Munsif Judge/Metropolitan Magistrate/Any other judiciary related designation to be included (re-included)

=== All India Legal Service ===
The promotional hierarchy of All India Legal Service (Group 'A' gazetted officers) in mentioned below (Bottom to Top)

- Attorney General of India
- Solicitor General of India /Any other law related designation to be included
- Additional Solicitor General of India/Any other law related designation to be included
- Second Additional Solicitor General/Notary Public/Joint Law Officer/Senior Judge-Advocate General to Indian Armed Forces/Any other law related designation to be included
- Senior Government Advocate/Notary Public/Additional Law Officer/Senior Government Advocate/Senior Judge-Advocate General to Indian Armed Forces/Any other law related designation to be included
- Government Advocate/Notary Public/Joint Legal Advisor to the Central Government/Law Secretary to Government of India/Law Officer/Senior Judge-Advocate General to Indian Armed Forces/Any other law related designation to be included
- Additional Government Advocate/Notary Public/Additional Legislative Counsel/Additional Legal Advisor to the Central Government/Legal Advisor to Governor of State/Additional Law Officer/Law Secretary of India/Senior Judge-Advocate General to Indian Armed Forces/Any other law related designation to be included
- Deputy Government Advocate/Deputy Law Officer/Deputy Legislative Counsel/Deputy Legal Advisor to the Central Government/Deputy Law Officer/Junior Judge-Advocate General to Indian Armed Forces/Any other law related designation to be included
- Assistant Government Advocate/Assistant Law Officer/Assistant Legislative Counsel/Assistant Legal Advisor to the Central Government/Assistant Law Officer/Junior Judge-Advocate General to Indian Armed Forces/Any other law related designation to be included
- Superintendent (Legal)/Any other law related designation to be included
- Law Associate cum Research Assistant in Courts and Tribunals at national level/Para-legal to the Central Government/Any other law related designation to be included

=== State Regional Legal Service ===
There shall be one state regional legal service cadre per state of India. The promotional hierarchy of State Regional Legal Service (Group 'A' gazetted officers) is mentioned below (Bottom to Top)

- Advocate General of State
- Additional Advocate General/Notary Public/Government Pleader/Any other law related designation to be included
- Additional Advocate General/Notary Public/Assistant Government Pleader/Additional Law Officer/Any other law related designation to be included
- Deputy Advocate General/Public Prosecutor/Notary Public/Joint Legal Advisor to the State Government/Law Secretary to Government of State/Any other law related designation to be included
- Government Advocate/Special Public Prosecutor/Notary Public/Additional Legislative Counsel/Law Secretary of State/Any other law related designation to be included
- Additional Government Advocate/Additional Public Prosecutor/Additional Legislative Counsel/Additional Legal Advisor to the State Government/Law Secretary of State/Any other law related designation to be included
- Deputy Government Advocate/Deputy Public Prosecutor/Deputy Law Officer/Deputy Legislative Counsel/Deputy Legal Advisor to the State Government/Deputy Law Officer/Any other law related designation to be included
- Assistant Government Advocate/Assistant Public Prosecutor/Assistant Law Officer/Assistant Legislative Counsel/Assistant Legal Advisor to the State Government/Any other law related designation to be included
- Superintendent (Legal)/Any other law related designation to be included
- Law Associate cum Research Assistant in Courts and Tribunals at state level/Para legal to the State Government/Any other law related designation to be included

=== Indian Legal Services ===
All of the "Indian Legal Services" (Group 'A' gazetted officers) shall be allotted to all the attached offices, specialised units, autonomous organisations/bodies, regulatory bodies, statutory bodies, statutory corporations, national apex bodies, public sector units, subsidiaries of public sector units, divisions of public sector units and all other government establishments under Government of India. The hierarchy of Indian Legal Services Officers in any of the central government establishments under the government of India shall be in the following manner.

- Principal Chief Legal Advisor cum Attorney to any of the central government establishments
- Chief Legal Advisor cum Attorney to any of the central government establishments
- Deputy Legal Advisor cum Attorney to any of the central government establishments
- Assistant Legal Advisor cum Attorney to any of the central government establishments
- Legal Assistant to any of the central government establishments

The list of "Indian legal services" cadres shall be as follows:

- Indian Agriculture & Farmers Welfare Legal Service
- Indian Animal Husbandry, Dairying And Fisheries Legal Service
- Indian AYUSH Legal Service
- Indian Chemicals and Fertilizers Legal Service
- Indian Coal Legal Service
- Indian Commerce and Industry Legal Service
- Indian Communications Legal Service
- Indian Consumer Affairs, Food and Public Distribution Legal Service
- Indian Corporate Affairs Legal Service
- Indian Culture Legal Service
- Indian Defence Legal Service
- Indian Development of North Eastern Region Legal Service
- Indian Earth Sciences Legal Service
- Indian Electronics and Information Technology Legal Service
- Indian Environment, Forests and Climate Change Legal Service
- Indian Finance Legal Service
- Indian Food Processing Industries Legal Service
- Indian Health and Family Welfare Legal Service
- Indian Heavy Industries and Public Enterprises Legal Service
- Indian Home Affairs Legal Service
- Indian Housing and Urban Affairs Legal Service
- Indian Information and Broadcasting Legal Service
- Indian Jal Shakti Legal Service
- Indian Labour and Employment Legal Service
- Indian Micro, Small and Medium Enterprises Legal Service
- Indian Mines Legal Service
- Indian Minority Affairs Legal Service
- Indian New and Renewable Energy Legal Service
- Indian Petroleum and Natural Gas Legal Service
- Indian Ports, Shipping and Waterways Legal Service
- Indian Power Legal Service
- Indian Rural Development Legal Service
- Indian Road Transport and Highways Legal Service
- Indian Railways Legal Service
- Indian Science and Technology Legal Service
- Indian Skill Development and Entrepreneurship Legal Service
- Indian Social Justice and Empowerment Legal Service
- Indian Statistics and Programme Implementation Legal Service
- Indian Steel Legal Service
- Indian Textiles Legal Service
- Indian Tourism Legal Service
- Indian Tribal Affairs Legal Service
- Indian Women and Child Development Legal Service
- Indian Youth Affairs and Sports Legal Service
- Indian Cooperative Societies Legal Service

=== State Legal Services ===
There shall be as many "State Legal Services" cadres per state of India as decided by the state governments of India. "State Legal Service" Group 'B' gazetted officers shall be allotted to all the attached offices, specialised units, autonomous organisations/bodies, regulatory bodies, statutory bodies, state apex bodies, statutory corporations, public sector units, subsidiaries of public sector units, divisions of public sector units etc. and all other government establishments under each of the state governments of India. The hierarchy of state legal service officers in any of the state government establishments under any of the state governments of India shall be in the following manner.

- Principal Chief Legal Advisor cum Advocate to any of the state government establishments
- Chief Legal Advisor cum Advocate to any of the state government establishments
- Deputy Legal Advisor cum Advocate to any of the state government establishments
- Assistant Legal Advisor cum Advocate to any of the state government establishments
- Legal Assistant to any of the state government establishments

The list of "state legal services" cadres shall be as follows:

- To be decided by the state governments of India in their respective state

== Functions of the Commission ==
As per the amended constitution, the functions of the Commission would have included the following:

- Recommending persons for appointment as Chief Justice of India, Judges of the Supreme Court, Chief Justices of High Courts and other Judges of High Courts.
- Recommending transfer of Chief Justices and other Judges of High Courts from one High Court to any other High Court.
- Ensuring that the persons recommended are of ability, merit and other criteria mentioned in the regulations related to the act.

== Procedures to be followed by the Commission ==
The National Judicial Appointments Commission Bill, 2014, had laid down the following procedures for the selection of the Judges of the higher judiciary.

=== Procedure for selection of Supreme Court judges ===
==== Chief Justice of India ====
The Commission shall recommend the senior-most judge of the Supreme Court for appointment as Chief Justice of India. This is provided he/she is considered fit to hold the office. However, this must be according to the knowledge one possesses rather than the age.

==== Supreme Court judges ====
The Commission shall recommend names of persons on the basis of their ability, merit and other criteria specified in the regulations.

The Commission shall not recommend a person for appointment if any two of its members do not agree to such recommendation.

=== Procedure for selection of High Courts judges ===
==== Chief Justices of High Courts ====
The Commission shall recommend a Judge of a High Court to be the Chief Justice of a High Court on the basis of seniority across High Court judges. The ability, merit and other criteria of suitability as specified in the regulations would also be considered.

==== Appointment of other High Court judges ====
The Commission shall seek nominations from Chief Justice of the concerned High Court for appointments of High Court Judges or forward a list of such names to the Chief Justice of the concerned High Courts for his/her views. In both cases, the Chief Justice of the High Court shall consult two senior-most judges of that High Court and any other judges and advocates as specified in the regulations. The Commission shall elicit the views of the Governor and Chief Minister of the state before making recommendations. The Commission shall not recommend a person for appointment if any two members of the Commission do not agree to such recommendation.

== Challenge to the constitutionality ==
The validity of the constitutional amendment act and the NJAC Act were challenged by certain lawyers, lawyer associations and groups before the Supreme Court of India through public interest litigation writ petitions who saw it as an attempt by the government to compromise with the independence of the country's judiciary. Earlier in August 2014, Supreme Court had dismissed the few writ petitions challenging the validity of NJAC on the ground that the challenge was premature as the constitutional amendment and the NJAC Act had not been notified then. After the fresh challenge in 2015 after the acts were notified, a three judge bench of the Supreme Court referred the matter to a Constitution Bench.

== SC declares NJAC unconstitutional ==
In a collective order, on 16 October 2015 the Supreme Court by a majority of 4:1 struck down the NJAC Act, 2014 meant to replace the two-decade old collegium system of appointing judges in the higher judiciary stating that the NJAC was a clear attempt to compromise independence of the judiciary, which went against the Constitution's basic structure. The judgement was hailed by activist lawyers like Prashant Bhushan and Ram Jethmalani, who had appeared for the petitioners challenging NJAC, while other jurists, lawyers and activists such as KK Venugopal, KTS Tulsi and Jayaprakash Narayana opposed it.

== Support for NJAC ==
The only one of the five-judge bench who opposed the majority decision was Jasti Chelameswar, who held that the proposed composition of the NJAC would not be a constitutional issue, and that it could have acted “as a check on unwholesome trade-offs within the collegium and incestuous accommodations between Judicial and Executive branches.”

The ruling party of India, Bharatiya Janata Party, which has been the main advocate of the NJAC, remains committed to it, citing instances of corruption, favouritism & nepotism within the collegium system, the most notable case being the D. Y. Chandrachud, son of former CJI Y. V. Chandrachud being elevated by the collegium to be the next CJI.

=== Later developments ===
On 3 November 2015 the Supreme Court upheld that it is open to bringing greater transparency in the collegium system within the following existing four parameters, with opinions from both the parties(petitioners who challenged the NJAC and the government).

- How the collegium can be made transparent
- The fixing of the eligibility criteria for a person to be considered suitable for appointment as a judge
- A process to receive and deal with complaints against judges without compromising on judicial independence
- Debate on whether a separate secretariat is required, and if so, its functioning, composition and powers

On 19 November 2015 the Attorney General Mukul Rohatgi informed the Supreme Court that the central government will not prepare a draft memorandum for judicial appointments contrary to committed earlier and suggested the same to be done through a judgement.

On December 8, 2022, Vice President Jagdeep Dhankhar, who had also practiced in the Supreme Court as an advocate, commented in his maiden speech to the Rajya Sabha, that the Court's decision to strike down NJAC by invoking the basic structure doctrine, was an unprecedented encroachment on the powers of the parliament by the judiciary, thereby violating the theory of separation of powers.

== See also ==
- Collegium system
- Basic structure doctrine
- Kesavananda Bharati v. State of Kerala
- Amendment of the Constitution of India
- All India Judicial Service: another proposed system of appointment to the judiciary under government oversight, introduced by Indira Gandhi.
- Ninety-ninth Amendment of the Constitution of India
- 2023 Israeli judicial reform: similar attempt by the Israeli government under Benjamin Netanyahu to introduce greater government control over judicial appointments.
