= Munsiff Court =

Lowest civil court in India

Munsiff Court (alternate spelling Munsif Court) is the court of the lowest order handling matters pertaining to civil matters, including rent control jurisdiction and execution matters, in the district. This is a legal system mainly followed in the Indian subcontinent. Usually, the Munsiff Court is controlled by the District Court of the respective district. The Court of Munsiff is authorised to try matters pertaining to certain pecuniary limits. The State Government notifies the pecuniary limits for the Munsiff Courts. The court is headed by a munsiff magistrate/judicial collector, who is generally an entry level judicial officer in the rank of Civil Judge (Junior Division).

The appeal against these courts lies before the Subordinate Courts (Court of Sub-Judge) which are one rank superior to the District Munsiff Courts but are inferior to the District court. The State Government, in consultation with the high court of the state, prescribes the territorial jurisdiction of the Court of Munsiff. The district is further divided into subdivisions; each subdivision has an in-charge tax inspector and Registrar magistrate. The munsiff magistrate is the judge and presiding officer of the District who keep charge of all tax inspectors (tehsildars). Enforcement is under Civil Procedure Code, 1908.

== History ==
The court of Munsiff was formed by Lord Cornwallis under the Cornwallis Code of 1793. The word "Munsiff" is derived from classical Arabic which literally means - a person who is "just" or "equitable" or "impartial" in their judgments or while dealing with others. Under Cornwallis Code, the court of Munsiff was created to give Indian natives a grassroot level position in district level judiciary. They were empowered to try cases upto Rs. 50, at that time and they were empowered to try personal laws too. The Munsiffs were also authorised to issue process of distraint against defaulting Raiyats on the application of the Zamindar of the property. Earlier, Munsiffs were not even allowed to enforce their own decree or orders as it was to be done by the Judge. However, after 1803, the jurisdiction of Munsiffs were considerably widened. Immediate superior to Munsiffs were Sadar Ameens (also known as Head Native Commissioners). In 1801, on an initial proposal by Judge of Zillah Behar (Gaya, Bihar), the Sadar Ameens were now authorised to try cases of upto Rs. 200 and Moonsifs upto Rs. 100. However, three out of five provincial courts and most District and Sessions Judges were opposed to any extension of powers of Munsiffs. Those who favoured emphasised the practicality in relieving District Courts and superiority of Indian judges to understand, assess, and try cases at the lowest rung more judiciously.

== See also ==
- District Courts of India
- Indian law
- Judiciary of India
