= Ashok Bhushan =

Chairperson of National Company Law Appellate Tribunal

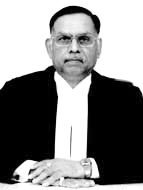
- Justice Ashok Bhushan

Chairperson of National Company Law Appellate Tribunal
- In office 8 November 2021 – 4 July 2026
- Appointed by: Appointments Committee of the Cabinet
- Preceded by: S. J. Mukhopadhaya
- Succeeded by: Rajesh Bindal

Judge of the Supreme Court of India
- In office 13 May 2016 – 4 July 2021
- Nominated by: T. S. Thakur
- Appointed by: Pranab Mukherjee

Chief Justice of the Kerala High Court
- In office 26 March 2015 – 12 May 2016
- Nominated by: H. L. Dattu
- Appointed by: Pranab Mukherjee

Acting Chief Justice of the Kerala High Court
- In office 1 August 2014 – 25 March 2015
- Appointed by: Pranab Mukherjee

Judge of the Kerala High Court
- In office 10 July 2014 – 31 July 2015
- Nominated by: Rajendra Mal Lodha
- Appointed by: Pranab Mukherjee

Judge of the Allahabad High Court
- In office 24 April 2001 – 9 July 2014
- Nominated by: Adarsh Sein Anand
- Appointed by: Kocheril Raman Narayanan

Personal details
- Born: 5 July 1956 (age 70) Jaunpur district, Uttar Pradesh, India
- Education: Allahabad University
- Website: www.sci.gov.in

Ashok Bhushan (born 5 July 1956) is a former judge of the Supreme Court of India and former chairperson of the National Company Law Appellate Tribunal. He was the 31st chief justice of the Kerala High Court. He is a former judge of the Kerala High Court and Allahabad High Court.

== Early life ==
Ashok Bhushan was born in Jaunpur district, Uttar Pradesh on 5 July 1956 to the late Chandrama Prasad Srivastava and his wife Kalavathi Srivasthava. After receiving a Bachelor of Arts in 1975 he studied law in Allahabad University and graduated in 1979.

== Career ==
Bhushan started his career in advocacy by enrolling with Bar Council of Uttar Pradesh on 6 April 1979 and started practising in civil and original side at Allahabad High Court until his elevation to the bench. While practising as an advocate in Allahabad High Court, he served as the standing counsel for various institutions such as Allahabad University, State Mineral Development Corporation Limited and several municipal boards, banks and education institutions and also as the senior vice–president of the Allahabad High Court Bar Association.

He was elevated as permanent judge of the Allahabad High Court on 24 April 2001 he served as chairman of the Higher Judicial Service committee and headed several other committees.

He was appointed as a judge of the High Court of Kerala on 10 July 2014, taking charge as acting chief justice on 1 August 2014 and as chief justice on 26 March 2015.

He was appointed as a judge of the Supreme Court of India on 13 May 2016.

On the farewell speech organised by the Supreme Court Bar Association, Ashok said “Grant of appropriate remedy is not the discretion of the judge but his obligation. Justice must be tempered with mercy but justice cannot be substituted for mercy.” He retired on 4 July 2021.

On 8 November 2021, he took the oath as the chairperson of National Company Law Appellate Tribunal where he served till 4 July 2026.
