= I. M. Quddusi =

Odisha High Court Judge

Ishrat Masroor Quddusi is a retired Indian judge who served in three high courts of India. He retired as a judge of Odisha High Court. Earlier he was judge in the Allahabad High Court and Chhattisgarh High Court. He was arrested by the CBI on charges of attempting to help Uttar Pradesh-based Prasad Education Trust, an educational trust barred from admitting students by the government and Medical Council of India.
