= Constitution bench (India) =

Panels within the Supreme Court of India

Constitution bench is the name given to the benches of the Supreme Court of India which consist of at least five judges of the court which sit to decide any case “involving a substantial question of law as to the interpretation” of the Constitution of India or "for the purpose of hearing any reference" made by the President of India under Article 143. This provision has been mandated by Article 145 (3) of the Constitution of India. Also, matters related to the Amendment of an Act of the Indian Parliament are referred to the Constitution Bench by the Supreme Court under the same act. The Chief Justice of India has the power to constitute a Constitution Bench and refer cases to it.

Constitution benches have decided many of India's best-known and most important Supreme Court cases: A. K. Gopalan v. State of Madras, Kesavananda Bharati v. State of Kerala (basic structure doctrine), Ashoka Kumar Thakur v. Union of India (OBC reservations), Kharak Singh v. State of Uttar Pradesh and Others, McDowell & Company Limited v. CTO etc.
