= Collegium system =

Rulings on judicial independence in India

The collegium system is a collegium where incumbent judges of the Supreme Court of India appoint judges to the Judiciary of India. It originated from three Supreme Court judgments (rendered in 1981, 1993, and 1998), collectively known as the Three Judges Cases. The system is alleged for being nepotistic and has faced widespread condemnation.

== History ==
=== Evolution of the concept ===
The three Judges Cases are:

1. S. P. Gupta v. Union of India – 1981 (also known as the Judges' Transfer case)
2. Supreme Court Advocates-on Record Association vs Union of India – 1993
3. In re Special Reference 1 of 1998

Over the course of the three cases, the court evolved the principle of judicial independence to mean that no other branch of the state, including the legislature and the executive, would have any say in the appointment of judges. The court then created the collegium system, which has been in use since the judgment in the second Judges Case was issued in 1993. The third Judges Case is not a case but an opinion delivered by the Supreme Court responding to a question of law regarding the collegium system, raised by then President of India K. R. Narayanan, in July 1998 under his constitutional powers. There is no explicit mention of the collegium either in the original Constitution of India or in any successive amendments.

In January 2013, the court dismissed as without locus standi, a public interest litigation filed by NGO Suraz India Trust that sought to challenge the collegium system of appointment, while in July, then Chief Justice P. Sathasivam spoke against any attempts to change the collegium system.

==== Judicial interpretation of the word "recommendation" ====
In the third Judges Case, the Supreme Court has elaborately dealt with the modality of rendering recommendation by a constitutional entity such as the Supreme Court, the President of India, etc. It is not at the discretion of the person consulted to render the recommendation but internal consultations with the peers shall be made in writing, and the recommendation shall be made in accordance with the internal consultations. Here, internal consultations refer to panels of existing Supreme Court judges appointed by existing judges.

=== 2014 failed National Judicial Appointments Commission proposal ===
On 13 and 14 August 2014, the Lok Sabha and the Rajya Sabha respectively passed the National Judicial Appointments Commission (NJAC) Bill, 2014 and the Constitution (121st Amendment) Bill, 2014, which amends articles 124(2) and 217(1) of the Constitution of India by establishing the National Judicial Appointments Commission, on whose recommendation the President would appoint judges to the higher judiciary in order to scrap the collegium system. President Pranab Mukherjee gave his assent on 31 December 2014, after which the bills became National Judicial Appointments Commission Act, 2014 and the Constitution (99th Amendment) Act, 2014 respectively.

However, on 16 October 2015, the Constitution Bench of the Supreme Court, consisting of Justices J. S. Khehar, Madan Lokur, Kurian Joseph, Adarsh Kumar Goel and Jasti Chelameswar, struck down the 99th constitutional amendment and the NJAC Act by a majority opinion of 4:1 in Supreme Court Advocate on Record Association v. Union of India, with Justice Chelameswar dissenting, restoring the previous collegium system. The Bench declared that the Act is unconstitutional since it interfered with the autonomy of the judiciary by the executive which amounts to tampering with the basic structure of the constitution where Parliament is not empowered to change so. However, the Bench also acknowledged that the collegium system is lacking transparency and credibility which would be rectified or improved by the Judiciary.

== Current members of the Collegium ==
=== High Court Elevation ===
1. Surya Kant, incumbent Chief Justice of India

2. Vikram Nath, Judge of the Supreme Court

3. B. V. Nagarathna, Judge of the Supreme Court

=== Supreme Court Elevation and Transfers ===
4. M. M. Sundresh, Judge of the Supreme Court

5. P. S. Narasimha, Judge of the Supreme Court

== Criticism ==
The collegium system is notorious for the nepotistic phenomenon called the uncle judge syndrome. In 2017, the Supreme Court of India had recognised the rot of the collegium, but as of 2025 little has been done to fix it. In 2015, advocate Mathews J Nedumpara claims that around 50% of the High Court judges and 33% of the Supreme Court judges are family members of those in higher echelons of judiciary, with six Supreme Court judges were sons of former judges and over 88 High Court judges were either born to a family of lawyers, judges, or worked under some legal luminaries. while in 2022, former Minister of State for Human Resource Development Upendra Kushwaha noted that judges of Supreme Court so far have come only from 250-300 families, and there is negligible representation of women and Scheduled Castes in the higher judiciary. Consequently, the collegium system has often been alleged to have caste bias due to the lack of representation of marginalised communities such as the Other Backward Class, Scheduled Castes and Scheduled Tribes.

Jasti Chelameswar, a Supreme Court judge, who was a part of the NJAC verdict of 2015, gave a dissenting opinion, stating that the NJAC could have acted “as a check on unwholesome trade-offs within the collegium and incestuous accommodations between Judicial and Executive branches.” He had criticized the existing collegium system of appointing judges, which he said had become "a euphemism for nepotism", where "mediocrity or even less" is promoted and a "constitutional disorder" does not look distant.

According to a hearing in December 2022, the Supreme Court ruling stated that the Right to Information Act will not apply to any internal discussions of the collegium system on the reasons of appointing judges, limiting transparency and judicial accountability towards the citizens, although the RTI will still apply to the other aspects of Supreme Court and the judiciary. In August 2026, Ujjal Bhuyan, a Supreme Court judge, condemned the collegium system, saying that the opaqueness in not disclosing the reasons for appointments in the collegium was doing a disservice to the judiciary.

The collegium system has failed to address filling vacant positions at the High Court and Supreme Court levels. In 2022, the sanctioned number of judges in India was 21.03 judges per million population, while the actual number of judges was noted at 14.4 per million population, up from 13.2 in 2016, and several experts have stated that the minimum number of judges should be as per the global standard of 50 per million population. In 2026, the number rose to 15 judges per million population, in contrast to 150 in the United States as per 2024 New York Times survey. The vacant positions for both judges and non-judicial staff have led to a rise in pendency of cases; as of May 2022, a total of 4.7 crore (47 million) cases are pending in courts nationwide. By August 2026, the number of cases have risen to over 56 million.

Critics have argued that the collegium system has not addressed the competency or professional capabilities of judges at district level when permanently elevating or promoting them to High Court or Supreme Court, especially if they are temporarily elevated. This was largely seen with Pushpa Virendra Ganediwala, an additional judge with the Bombay High Court, who faced widespread condemnation by media and political figures for a series of controversial judgements in several cases of sexual assault. As a result of this, Ganediwala was denied permanent elevation by the Supreme Court collegium, and she eventually tendered her resignation in February 2022.

The collegium system has also been criticized for not implementing tough action against judges involved in misconduct or corruption. In April 2026, Yashwant Varma, judge from the Delhi High Court, resigned after bundles of currency notes were found at his residence following a fire. Rather than initiate criminal charges for prosecution, Varma was transferred to Allahabad High Court by the Supreme Court where he was not assigned any judicial duties, although the impeachment proceedings were initiated by the Lok Sabha.

== See also ==
- Corruption in Indian judiciary
- Nepotism
- National Judicial Appointments Commission
- Kesavananda Bharati v. State of Kerala
