= Ninety-ninth Amendment of the Constitution of India =

Formed the National Judicial Appointments Commission; voided, 2016

The Constitution (Ninety-ninth Amendment) Act, 2014

Parliament of India
- Long title: An Act further to amend the Constitution of India.
- Territorial extent: India
- Enacted by: Lok Sabha
- Enacted: 13 August 2014
- Assented to: 13 April 2015
- Signed by: Pranab Mukherjee
- Signed: 13 April 2015
- Commenced: 13 April 2015

Legislative history
- Bill title: The Constitution (Ninety-ninth Amendment) Bill, 2014

Summary
- Provides for composition of the NJAC
- Status: Struck down

The Ninety-ninth Amendment of the Constitution of India, officially known as The Constitution (Ninety-ninth Amendment) Act, 2014, formed a National Judicial Appointments Commission. 16 State assemblies out of 29 States including Goa, Rajasthan, Tripura, Gujarat and Telangana ratified the Central Legislation, enabling the President of India to give assent to the bill. The amendment was struck down by the Supreme Court on 16 October 2015.

== Text ==
BE it enacted by Parliament in the Sixty-fifth Year of the Republic of India as follows:—

1. (1) This Act may be called the Constitution (Ninety-ninth Amendment) Act, 2014. (2) It shall come into force on such date as the Central Government may, by notification in the Official Gazette, appoint. 2. In article 124 of the Constitution, in clause (2),–– (a) for the words "after consultation with such of the Judges of the Supreme Court and of the High Courts in the States as the President may deem necessary for the purpose", the words, figures and letter "on the recommendation of the National Judicial Appointments Commission referred to in article 124A" shall be substituted;(b) the first proviso shall be omitted; (c) in the second proviso, for the words "Provided further that", the words "Provided that" shall be substituted. 3. After article 124 of the Constitution, the following articles shall be inserted, namely:— "124A. (1) There shall be a Commission to be known as the National Judicial Appointments Commission consisting of the following, namely:–– (a) the Chief Justice of India, Chairperson, ex officio; (b) two other senior Judges of the Supreme Court next to the Chief Justice of India ––Members, ex officio; (c) the Union Minister in charge of Law and Justice––Member, ex officio; (d) two eminent persons to be nominated by the committee consisting of the Prime Minister, the Chief Justice of India and the Leader of Opposition in the House of the People or where there is no such Leader of Opposition, then, the Leader of single largest Opposition Party in the House of the People –– Members: Provided that one of the eminent person shall be nominated from amongst the persons belonging to the Scheduled Castes, the Scheduled Tribes, Other Backward Classes, Minorities or Women: Provided further that an eminent person shall be nominated for a period of three years and shall not be eligible for renomination. (2) No act or proceedings of the National Judicial Appointments Commission shall be questioned or be invalidated merely on the ground of the existence of any vacancy or defect in the constitution of the Commission. 124B. It shall be the duty of the National Judicial Appointments Commission to— (a) recommend persons for appointment as Chief Justice of India, Judges of the Supreme Court, Chief Justices of High Courts and other Judges of High Courts; (b) recommend transfer of Chief Justices and other Judges of High Courts from one High Court to any other High Court; and (c) ensure that the person recommended is of ability and integrity. 124C. Parliament may, by law, regulate the procedure for the appointment of Chief Justice of India and other Judges of the Supreme Court and Chief Justices and other Judges of High Courts and empower the Commission to lay down by regulations the procedure for the discharge of its functions, the manner of selection of persons for appointment and such other matters as may be considered necessary by it.". 4. In article 127 of the Constitution, in clause (1), for the words "the Chief Justice of India may, with the previous consent of the President", the words "the National Judicial Appointments Commission on a reference made to it by the Chief Justice of India, may with the previous consent of the President" shall be substituted. 5. In article 128 of the Constitution, for the words "the Chief Justice of India", the words "the National Judicial Appointments Commission" shall be substituted6. In article 217 of the Constitution, in clause (1), for the portion beginning with the words "after consultation", and ending with the words "the High Court", the words, figures and letter "on the recommendation of the National Judicial Appointments Commission referred to in article 124A" shall be substituted. 7. In article 222 of the Constitution, in clause (1), for the words "after consultation with the Chief Justice of India", the words, figures and letter "on the recommendation of the National Judicial Appointments Commission referred to in article 124A" shall be substituted. 8. In article 224 of the Constitution,–– (a) in clause (1), for the words "the President may appoint", the words "the President may, in consultation with the National Judicial Appointments Commission, appoint" shall be substituted; (b) in clause (2), for the words "the President may appoint", the words "the President may, in consultation with the National Judicial Appointments Commission, appoint" shall be substituted. 9. In article 224A of the Constitution, for the words "the Chief Justice of a High Court for any State may at any time, with the previous consent of the President", the words "the National Judicial Appointments Commission on a reference made to it by the Chief Justice of a High Court for any State, may with the previous consent of the President" shall be substituted.

10. In article 231 of the Constitution, in clause (2), sub-clause (a) shall be omitted.

== Announcement ==
S.O. 999(E).—In exercise of the powers conferred by sub-section (2) of section 1 of the Constitution (Ninety-ninth Amendment) Act, 2014, the Central Government hereby appoints the 13th day of April, 2015, as the date on which the said Act shall come into force.

== Struck down by Supreme Court of India ==
The NJAC act was challenged in Supreme Court by Supreme Court Advocates on Record Association (SCAORA) and others contending that the new law is unconstitutional and it is aimed at hurting the independence of judiciary. After accepting the petition, on October 16, the five-member constitutional bench of Supreme Court headed by the Justice J.S. Kheharwith 4:1 majority has declared the National Judicial Appointments Commission and the 99th Constitutional Amendment act as "unconstitutional and void".

=== Judgement of the Supreme Court bench ===
- The Constitution (Ninety-ninth Amendment) Act, 2014 and the National Judicial Appointments Commission Act, 2014, is declared unconstitutional and void.
- The system of appointment and transfers of Judges higher judiciary, as existing prior to the Constitution (Ninety-ninth Amendment) Act, 2014 (called the "collegium system"), is declared to be operative.
- The clauses provided in the amendment are inadequate to preserve the primacy of the judiciary, a basic feature of the constitution.
- Inclusion of Law Minister in the commission impinged both on the independence of the judiciary and the doctrine of separation of powers between the judiciary and the executive.
- The bench also rejected for reference to a larger Bench, and for reconsideration of the Second and Third Judges cases.
- To consider introduction of appropriate measures, if any, for an improved working of the "collegium system".
