= Jasti Chelameswar =

Indian judge (born 1953)

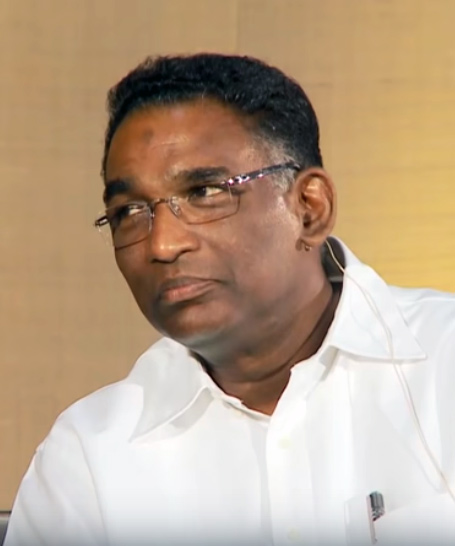
- Jasti Chelameswar (April 2014)

Judge of the Supreme Court of India
- In office 10 October 2011 – 22 June 2018
- Nominated by: S. H. Kapadia
- Appointed by: Pratibha Patil

Chief Justice of the Kerala High Court
- In office 17 March 2010 – 9 October 2011
- Nominated by: K. G. Balakrishnan
- Appointed by: Pratibha Patil
- Preceded by: S. R. Bannurmath
- Succeeded by: Manjula Chellur

Chief Justice of the Gauhati High Court
- In office 2 May 2007 – 17 March 2010
- Nominated by: K. G. Balakrishnan
- Appointed by: A. P. J. Abdul Kalam

Judge of the Andhra Pradesh High Court
- In office 23 June 1997 – 2 May 2007
- Nominated by: J. S. Verma
- Appointed by: Ramaswamy Venkataraman

Personal details
- Born: 23 June 1953 (age 73) Movva mandal, Krishna district, Andhra Pradesh, India
- Education: Andhra University, Loyola College, Chennai

Jasti Chelameswar (born 23 June 1953) is a former judge of the Supreme Court of India. He retired on 22 June 2018 as the second most senior Supreme Court judge. He was the chief justice of the Kerala High Court from 2010 to 2011 and of the Gauhati High Court from 2007 to 2010. He was also one of the four Supreme Court judges (along with Kurian Joseph, Ranjan Gogoi and Madan Lokur) who said they felt "compelled to call" a press conference over Chief Justice Dipak Misra's style of administration and allocation of cases.

== Early life ==
Chelameswar was born in Peddamuttevi village of Movva mandal, Krishna district, Andhra Pradesh, the son of Jasti Lakshminarayana, a lawyer who practised at the district court, and his wife Annapoornamma. After completing his schooling in Machilipatnam, Chelameswar enrolled at Loyola College, Chennai and obtained a Bachelor of Science degree with physics as his major subject. He then studied Law and obtained a Bachelor of Laws from Andhra University, Visakhapatnam in 1976.

== Career ==
Chelameswar served as an additional judge at the then High Court of Andhra Pradesh. Later, he became the chief justice of the Gauhati High Court in 2007. He was later transferred as the chief justice of the Kerala High Court and was elevated as a judge of the Supreme Court of India in October 2011.

According to an Op-Ed in The Economic Times:

Chelameswar, once a government pleader, was appointed additional judge in the Andhra Pradesh High Court in 1997. He has been chief justice of both the Gauhati and Kerala high courts where he is perceived as having done exemplary work on the green benches there. He was made a Supreme Court judge in 2011 after an unexplained delay. This denied him the chance to be chief justice of India. He has delivered several landmark judgements while in the top court.

=== 2018 Supreme Court crisis ===
Four Supreme Court judges, Ranjan Gogoi, Madan Lokur, and Kurian Joseph, apart from Chelameswar, held a press conference where they spoke against the Chief Justice of India Dipak Misra. At the press conference, Chelameswar said, “This is an extraordinary event in the history of the nation, more particularly this nation... The administration of the Supreme Court is not in order and many things which are less than desirable have happened in the last few months.”

== Notable judgements ==
=== Freedom of speech ===
Chelameswar and Rohinton Fali Nariman formed the two judge bench of the Supreme Court of India which struck down a controversial law which gave Indian police the power to arrest anyone accused of posting emails or other electronic messages which "causes annoyance or inconvenience". The judges held Section 66A of the Information Technology Act, which made such offenses punishable up to three years imprisonment, to be unconstitutional. According to Chelameswar and Nariman, several terms in the law they were striking down were "open-ended, undefined and vague" which made them nebulous in nature. According to the judges: "What may be offensive to one may not be offensive to another. What may cause annoyance or inconvenience to one may not cause annoyance or inconvenience to another.”

In their judgement the judges clarified that a distinction needs to be made between discussion, advocacy, and incitement. Any discussion, or advocacy of even an unpopular cause cannot be restricted, and it is only when such discussion or advocacy reaches the level of incitement whereby it causes public disorder or affects the security of the state can it be curbed.

The judgement has been welcomed for defending the Indian Constitution's ideals of tolerance and the Constitutional provisions of free speech. It has been pointed out that the controversial law struck down by Chelameswar and Nariman had gained notoriety after many people in India started getting arrested for seemingly innocuous reasons on the grounds that they had violated the now scrapped law.

=== Aadhaar ===
A three-judge bench of the Supreme Court, composed of Chelameswar, Sharad Arvind Bobde, and Chokkalingam Nagappan, ratified an earlier order of the Supreme Court and clarified that no Indian citizen without an Aadhaar card can be deprived of basic services and government subsidies. This ratification by the three-judge bench however was made invalid by the subsequent judgements of the Supreme Court and notifications by the Government of India making Aadhar mandatory for basic services and government subsidies.

=== National Judicial Appointments Commission (NJAC) verdict ===
In his dissenting opinion in the NJAC verdict (2015), Chelameswar had criticised the collegium system of appointing judges, which he said had become "a euphemism for nepotism" where "mediocrity or even less" is promoted and a "constitutional disorder" does not look distant.
