= Christian colleges and universities in India =

This is a list of Christian colleges and universities in India:

- Amala Institute of Medical Sciences
- Andhra Loyola College
- Andhra Loyola Institute of Engineering and Technology
- Arul Anandar College, Karumathur
- Assam Don Bosco University
- Bankura Christian College
- Baselios Poulose Second College
- Bharata Mata College
- Bishop Agniswamy College of Education
- Bishop Heber College
- Bishop Moore College
- BPC College Piravom
- Catholicate College Pathanamthitta
- Christ Church College, Kanpur
- Christ College, Irinjalakuda
- Christ University
- Christian Medical College, Ludhiana
- Christian Medical College, Vellore
- CMS College Kottayam
- CSI College of Engineering
- CSI Institute of Technology
- Devagiri College, Kozhikode
- Eastern Christian College, Dimapur
- Father Muller Medical College
- Fatima Mata National College
- Gossner College
- Henry Baker College
- Higher and Technical Institute of Mizoram
- Hindustan Institute of Technology and Science
- Hislop College
- Holy Cross College, Agartala
- Holy Cross College, Tiruchirapalli
- Jesus and Mary College
- Jnana-Deepa Vidyapeeth
- Jubilee Mission Medical College and Research Institute
- Jyothi Engineering College, Cheruthuruthy, Thrissur
- Jyoti Nivas College, Bangalore
- Karunya University
- Loyola College of Education, Chennai
- Loyola College of Social Sciences
- Loyola College, Chennai
- Loyola College, Mettala
- Loyola Degree College, Manvi
- Loyola Institute of Business Administration
- Loyola Technical Institute, Madurai
- Loyola-ICAM College of Engineering and Technology
- Little Flower College
- Little Flower Junior College
- Loreto College, Kolkata
- Madras Christian College
- Malabar Christian College
- Malankara Orthodox Syrian Church Medical College, Kolenchery
- Mar Athanasios College for Advanced Studies, Tiruvalla
- Mar Athanasius College of Engineering
- Mar Baselios College of Engineering and Technology
- Mar Gregorios College Punnapra
- Mar Ivanios College
- Mar Theophilos Training College, Trivandrum
- Mar Thoma College
- Martin Luther Christian University
- Mary Matha Arts & Science College
- Model Christian College, Kohima
- Mount Carmel College, Bangalore
- Mount Zion College of Engineering and Technology
- Navajyothi College Kannikkalam
- Newman College, Thodupuzha
- Nirmala College, Muvattupuzha
- North Bengal St. Xavier's College
- North East Adventist University, Meghalaya
- Northeast Adventist College, Meghalaya
- Pazhassi Raja College, Pulpally, Bathery
- Pushpagiri Medical College
- Sacred Heart College, Thevara
- Sacred Heart HSS Thiruvambady
- Sahrdaya College of Engineering and Technology
- Saint Paul's College, Goa
- Salesian College, Darjeeling
- Sam Higginbottom University of Agriculture, Technology and Sciences
- Sarah Tucker College
- Sarvodaya Vidyalaya, Trivandrum
- Sathyabama Institute of Science and Technology
- Scottish Church College
- Scott Christian College
- Senate of Serampore College (University)
- Sophia College for Women
- Spicer Adventist University, Pune
- Stella Maris College, Chennai
- St. Agnes PU College, Mangalore
- St. Albert's College
- St. Aloysius College (Mangalore)
- St. Aloysius College, Thrissur
- St. Andrew’s College of Arts, Science and Commerce
- St. Berchmans College
- St Claret College, Ziro
- St. Dominic's College
- St. Dominic's College
- St. Edmund's College, Shillong
- St Francis College for Women
- St. John's College, Agra
- St John's College, Anchal
- St. John's Medical College
- St. Joseph's College, Bangalore
- St. Joseph's Evening College, Bangalore
- St. Joseph's College of Commerce
- St Joseph's College, Darjeeling
- St. Joseph's College, Hassan
- St. Joseph's College, Jakhama
- St. Joseph's College, Tiruchirappalli
- St. Joseph's College for Women, Alappuzha
- St. Joseph's College of Engineering and Technology, Palai
- St. Joseph's College, Irinjalakuda
- St. Joseph's Institute of Management
- St. Joseph's Institute of Management, Bangalore
- St. Mary's College, Hyderabad
- St. Mary's College, Thrissur
- St. Paul's Cathedral Mission College
- St. Stephen's College, Delhi
- St. Teresa's College
- St. Thomas College, Kozhencherry
- St. Thomas College, Palai
- St. Thomas College, Thrissur
- St. Xavier's College, Ahmedabad
- St. Xavier's College, Burdwan
- St. Xavier's College, Dumka
- St. Xaviers College, Jaipur
- St. Xavier's College, Kolkata
- St. Xavier's College, Mumbai
- St. Xavier's College, Nevta
- St. Xavier's College of Education
- St. Xavier's College of Engineering
- St. Xavier's College, Palayamkottai
- St. Xavier's College, Patna
- St. Xavier's College, Ranchi
- St. Xavier's College, Simdega
- St. Xavier's College, Thumba
- St. Xavier's Technical Institute
- Voorhees College (India)
- Vimal Jyothi Engineering College
- Vimala College
- Wilson College, Mumbai
- Women's Christian College, Chennai
- Women's Christian College, Kolkata
- Xavier Institute of Social Service
- Xavier Institute of Business Administration
- Xavier Institute of Development Action and Studies
- Xavier Institute of Engineering
- Xavier Institute of Management & Research
- Xavier Institute of Management, Bhubaneswar
- Xavier University, Bhubaneswar
- Xavier University Bhubaneswar
- XLRI - Xavier School of Management

== See also ==
- Christian seminaries and theological institutions in India
