= St. Joseph's Institutions, Bangalore =

St. Joseph's Institutions is a conglomerate of educational institutions in the city of Bangalore, India. The institution was founded in the year 1882 by the Fathers of the French Foreign Mission. In 1937, the college was handed over to the Society of Jesus, a Catholic religious order dedicated to the education of young people. These schools and colleges are governed by the Bangalore Jesuit Educational Society, which is a part of the greater Society of Jesuits.

== Schools ==
- St. Joseph's Boy's High School

== Colleges ==
- St. Joseph's Pre-university College
- St. Joseph's College of Arts and Science
- St. Joseph's College of Commerce
- St Joseph's College of Law
- St Joseph's Institute of Management

== Sister Institutions ==
- St. Aloysius College, Mangalore

== See also ==
- List of Jesuit sites
