= Ziyad Rahman A. A =

Justice Ziyad Rahman A. A

Judge of the Kerala High Court
- Incumbent
- Assumed office 25 February 2021
- Nominated by: Sharad Arvind Bobde
- Appointed by: Ram Nath Kovind

Personal details
- Born: 12 May 1972 (age 54) Thrikkakara, Ernakulam
- Education: YMS Law College, Kundapura, Karnataka
- Website: High Court of Kerala

Ziyad Rahman Alevakkatt Abdul Rahiman (born May 12, 1972) is an Indian judge serving on the Kerala High Court, the highest court in the Indian state of Kerala and in the Union Territory of Lakshadweep.

== Early life and education ==
Rahman was born to Adv. A.A. Abdul Rahman and Latheepha at Thrikkakkara, Ernakulam District on May 12, 1972. He attended Mary Matha English Medium School, Thrikkakkara, Cardinal High School, Thrikkakkara, graduated in economics from St. Paul's College, Kalamassery and obtained Degree in law from YMS Law College, Kundapura, Karnataka in 1996.

== Career ==
Rahman enrolled as an Advocate on August 31, 1997 and started practicing in High Court of Kerala and Subordinate Courts in Ernakulam mainly in Electricity Act, Motor Vehicles Act, Insurance Act, Employees Compensation Act, Land Laws etc. During his practice, he served as Standing Counsel for New India Assurance Company Ltd. from 2011 till his appointment as Additional Judge of Kerala High Court on February 25, 2021. He became a permanent judge of that high court from June 6, 2022.
