= Kurian Joseph =

Indian judge (born 1953)

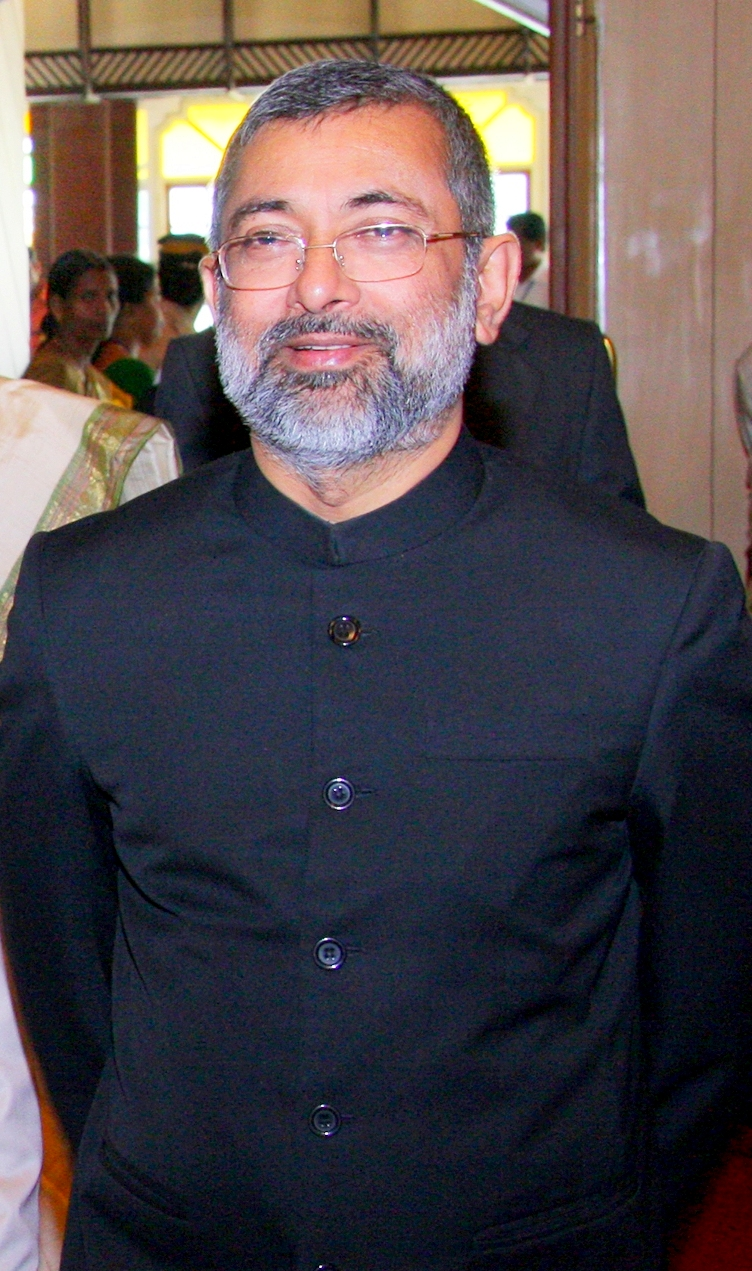
- Joseph in 2009

Judge of the Supreme Court of India
- In office 8 March 2013 – 29 November 2018
- Nominated by: Altamas Kabir
- Appointed by: Pranab Mukherjee

Chief Justice of the Himachal Pradesh High Court
- In office 8 February 2010 – 7 March 2013
- Nominated by: K. G. Balakrishnan
- Appointed by: Pratibha Patil

Judge of the Kerala High Court
- In office 12 July 2000 – 7 February 2010
- Nominated by: Adarsh Sein Anand
- Appointed by: K. R. Narayanan

Personal details
- Born: 30 November 1953 (age 72)
- Education: Mahatma Gandhi University; University of Kerala

Kurian Joseph (born 30 November 1953) is a former judge of the Supreme Court of India. Previously, he has served as chief justice of the Himachal Pradesh High Court and judge of the Kerala High Court.

== Early life ==
Kurian Joseph was born on 30 November 1953 in Thannipuzha a village near Angamaly. He was educated at St. Joseph's U.P. School, Chengal, Kalady, St. Sebastian's High School, Kanjoor. For higher education, he attended Bharata Mata College, Thrikkakara and Sree Sankara College, both affiliated colleges of Mahatma Gandhi University, and Kerala Law Academy, University of Kerala in Trivandrum.

== Career ==
Joseph began his legal career in 1979. He was a member of the Academic Council, Kerala University from 1977 to 1978, General Secretary of Kerala University Union in 1978, Senate member of Cochin University from 1983 to 1985, member of the Board of Studies, Indian Legal Thought of Mahatma Gandhi University in 1996, president of Kerala Judicial Academy from 2006 to 2008, chairman of Kerala High Court Legal Services committee from 2006 to 2009 and chairman of Lakshadweep Legal Services Authority in 2008. He served as government pleader in 1987 and as additional advocate general from 1994 to 1996. He was designated as senior advocate in 1996. Joseph has also been chairman of the Indian Law Institute Kerala Branch, Chairman of Indian Law Reports (Kerala Series) and executive member of the National University of Advanced Legal Studies.

In 2000, Kurian Joseph was appointed a judge of the Kerala High Court. In February 2010, he was elevated as Chief Justice of the Himachal Pradesh High Court. On 8 March 2013, he became a judge of the Supreme Court of India.

Joseph believes the judiciary should play a proactive role to meet people's high expectations of the judiciary.

== Notable cases ==
The bench of Justice R. M. Lodha, Justice Madan Lokur and Justice Joseph heard the controversial coal allocation scam case and vowed to free the Central Bureau of Investigation (CBI) from any political and bureaucratic interference. A bench of Chief Justice Lodha, Kurian Joseph and R. F. Nariman overruled the Afsal Guru decision on the point of admissibility of electronic evidence.

On 22 August 2017, Joseph gave a verdict against the controversial Triple Talaq. In his judgement he said, "I find it extremely difficult to agree with the learned Chief Justice that the practice of triple talaq has to be considered integral to the religious denomination in question and that the same is part of their personal law...."

== Post-retirement ==
Joseph has been appointed the arbitrator on behalf of the government of Kerala in the dispute with Adani Group over the completion of Vizhinjam Port in Kerala.
