= Paulose II =

Paulose II may refer to:

- Athanasius Paulose II (1915–1991), first Metropolitan of The Evangelistic Association of the East (consecrated as Metropolitan in 1973)
- Baselios Paulose II (1914–1996), Catholicos of the Jacobite Syrian Christian Church from 1975–2002
  - Baselios Poulose II Catholicos College, Piravom, Kerala, India
  - Baselios Poulose Second College, Ernakulam, Kerala, India
- Baselios Marthoma Paulose II, Catholicos of the East and Supreme Head of the Malankara Orthodox Syrian Church from 2010 until his death in 2021

== See also ==
- Paulose I (disambiguation)
- Baselios Paulose (disambiguation)
