= St Joseph's College of Law, Bengaluru =

St Joseph's College of Law, Bangalore
- Motto: Fide et Labore; By Faith and Hard Work
- Established: 2017
- Parent institution: St Joseph's University
- Religious affiliation: Roman Catholic (Jesuit)
- Academic affiliations: Karnataka State Law University
- President: Jerome S. D'Souza
- Director: Fr. Jerald D'Souza SJ
- Principal: Dr. Pauline Priya
- Location: 18 Cariappa (Residency) Rd. Bangalore-560025, India, Karnataka, Karnataka, India; 12°58′13.92″N 77°36′11.27″E
- Website: sjcl.edu.in

St Joseph's College of Law is a Jesuit law school in Bangalore, in Karnataka, in south-western India. It was founded in 2017. It is part of St. Joseph's Institutions. It is affiliated to Karnataka State Law University, Hubballi, and approved by the Bar Council of India in New Delhi.

== See also ==
- List of Jesuit sites
