= Xavier Institute of Development Action and Studies =

Business school in Jabalpur, India

Coordinates: 23°6′42.69″N 79°58′18.02″E

- Abbreviation: XIDAS
- Established: December 3, 1995; 30 years ago
- Location: Jabalpur, India
- Founder: Micheal Van Den Bogaert, SJ
- Director: Fr. (Dr.) Oscar S. Tirkey, SJ
- Dean: Asst. Prof. Cecil Anthony
- Main organ: Vikas Vani
- Affiliations: Jesuit, Catholic
- Website: XIDAS

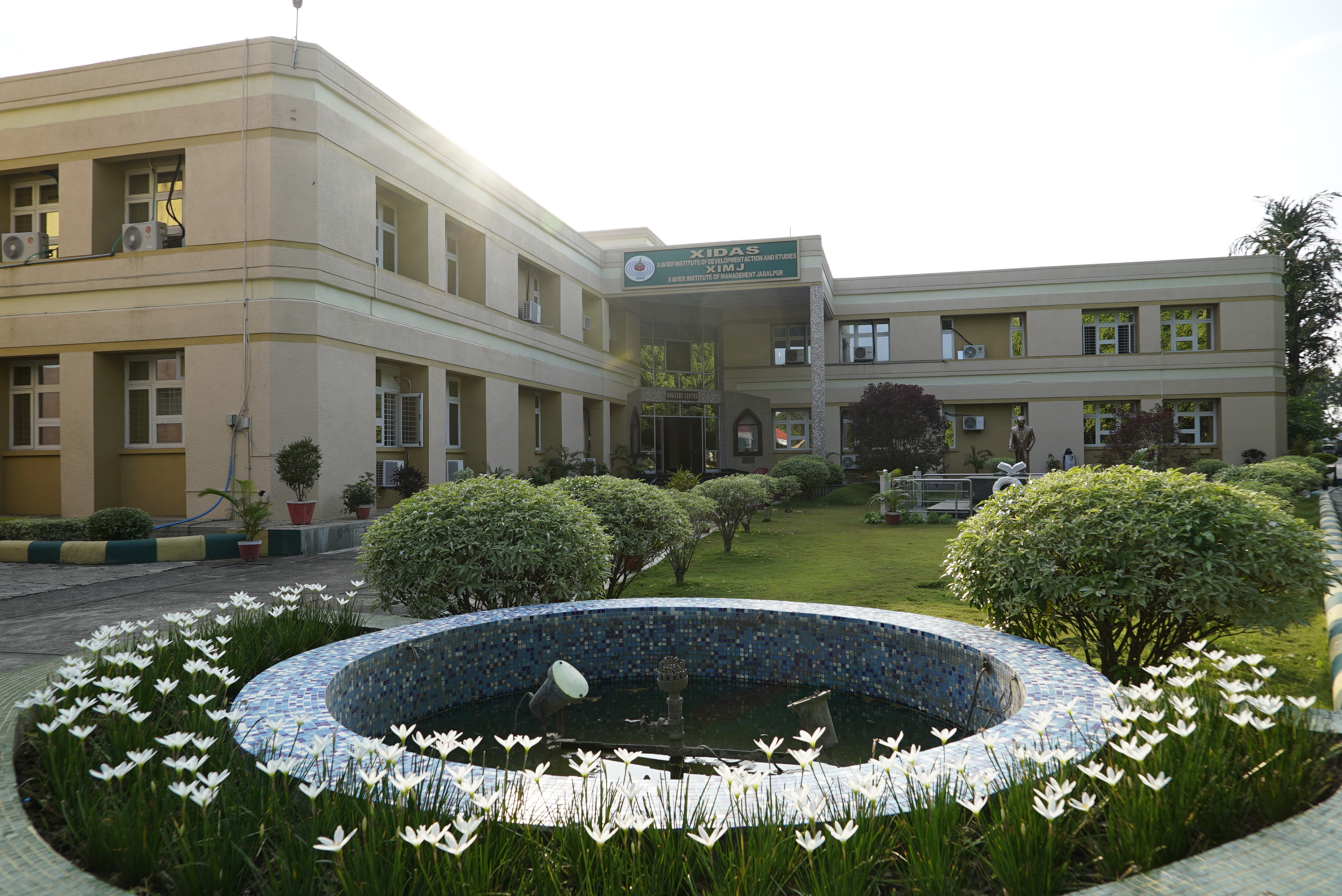
XIDAS front view

Xavier Institute of Development Action and Studies (XIDAS) is a Business School in Jabalpur, India, inaugurated on 3 December 1995 by the Madhya Pradesh Society of Jesus. It is rated among the top business schools in India.

== Founder and vision ==
The Belgian Jesuit Fr. Micheal Van Den Bogaert, S.J., came to India in 1951. He served among the poor in rural areas and in 1963 became director of Xavier Institute of Social Service, Ranchi. In 1987 he established the Centre for Development Research and Training (CENDERET) in Bhubaneswar, and went on to found XIDAS in 1995.

== Developments ==
In 1996 XIDAS was registered as a society under Society Registration Act of Madhya Pradesh, and began operating in the areas of research, project assessment and evaluation, training, and entrepreneurship development. Then in 1997 the Centres of Livelihood and Capacity Building were established in blocks and villages near Jabalpur. Research over the following years included a profile of Balaghat District with aid from BILANCE (now CORDAID, Belgium); studies conducted for NTPC Limited; and joint research on micro finance in Mandla District (MP) with support from UFSIA University, Antwerp.

The year 2000 saw the commencement of the MBA (Rural Management) programme and an exchange programme with Katholieke University Belgium. XIVANI newsletter was also launched. In 2001 the XIDAS extension in Raipur was established. In 2003 XIDAS moved to Tilhari, Mandla Road, Jabalpur.

In 2007 VIKAS VANI journal began publication along with the student magazine "The Catalyst". In 2008 the Post Graduate Diploma in Management began, (AICTE approved), along with the launching of a one-year certificate course in Development Management and a six-months certificate course in Community Organization.

In 2010 a Post Graduate diploma in Telecom Management began, and in Rural Management in 2013, both AICTE approved. A Fr. Bogaert Memorial Lecture took place in 2011, 2014, and 2015. International conferences were held, on Corporate Social Responsibility in 2012 and on Sustainable Development in 2014. In 2015 the first national students meet HENOSIS tool place.

== Academic programmes ==
Post Graduate Diploma in Management (PGDM) offers specialization in Marketing, Finance, and Human Resource and Post Graduate Diploma in Management–Rural Management (PGDM-RM) offers specialization in Rural Management. In second year, PGDM and PGDM-RM students have a choice of doing a major and minor specialization, in the areas of Finance, Marketing, and Human Resources.

== Centers of potential ==
XIDAS has been involved in research and consultation in the area of corporate social responsibility, rehabilitation and resettlement, and livelihood promotion, for public and private sector organizations.

XIDAS conducts socio-economic surveys, need assessment studies, social impact assessment, and management development programmes in the areas of social entrepreneurship and corporate social responsibility.

As to ecology, XIDAS takes up research, evaluation, training, awareness campaigns, and field projects.

XIDAS has a special focus on research and training in areas related to rural development. Its health care focus is on the national rural health mission, reproductive and child health, nutrition, sanitation and hygiene.

XIDAS enhances competencies amongst working professionals, managers, and executives. Training offered covers areas like finance, marketing, human resource management, rural development, urban governance, right to information, public distribution system, and watershed management.

== Social engineering projects and fieldwork ==
XIDAS collaborates with more than 48 government and public sector agencies, corporations, development organizations, research institutes, and academic bodies for undertaking social engineering, implementation, evaluations, consulting, trainings, research, academic and policy level deliberations, and other extension activities.

== Infrastructure ==
XIDAS campus spreads over 12 acres. XIDAS has set up two waste water recycling units inside the campus for sewage and wastewater management.

== See also ==
- List of Jesuit sites
