= Paulose I =

Paulose I may refer to:

- Baselios Paulose I (1836–1913), the first Catholicos of the East after its reinstatement in India, the first Catholicos of the Malankara Orthodox Syrian Church
- Cyril Baselios I (1935-2007), Maphrian and the first Major Archbishop of the Syro-Malankara Catholic Church

== See also ==
- Paulose II (disambiguation)
- Baselios Paulose (disambiguation)
