= Bharata Mata College =

Research college in Kerala, India

Bharata Mata College (Autonomous), Kochi
- ഭാരത മാത കോളേജ്, കൊച്ചി
- Crest of Bharata Mata College
- Other name: BMC
- Motto: Pro Deo et Patria
- Motto in English: For God and Country
- Type: Trust
- Established: 16 June 1965; 61 years ago
- Religious affiliation: Archdiocese of Ernakulam – Angamaly
- Academic affiliations: Mahatma Gandhi University, UGC
- Principal: Dr. Soumya Thomas
- Manager: Fr. Dr. Abraham Oliapurath
- Academic staff: 120
- Administrative staff: 38
- Students: 3,000
- Postgraduates: 140
- Doctoral students: 80
- Location: Kochi, Kerala, India; 10°49′00″N 76°20′6″E
- Website: www.bharatamatacollege.in/index.php

Bharata Mata College (Autonomous), Kochi is an institution of higher education, located in Kochi, in the south Indian state of Kerala. The college is affiliated to Mahatma Gandhi University and offers 17 undergraduate, 6 post-graduate and 2 professional programmes. The main campus also houses four research centres in Chemistry, Mathematics and Commerce and operates as the offcampus centre for the School of Distance Education of the Mahatma Gandhi University. It holds an A+ grade accredited by National Assessment and Accreditation Council (NAAC) since 2019.

== Overview ==
Bharata Mata College (Autonomous), Kochi was founded by Joseph Parecattil under the aegis of Bharata Mata Educational Trust of the Archdiocese of Ernakulam – Angamaly on 16 June 1965 as a junior college offering five pre-degree courses. The founding management was headed by Monsignor Varghese Kavalakatt as the manager and S. H. Antony CMI as the principal. It was affiliated to the University of Kerala at its inception. Five years later, four undergraduate courses were introduced and the college was upgraded as a regular college. In 1976, it was extended accreditation by the University Grants Commission and when Mahatma Gandhi University was established in 1983, the college was brought under its jurisdiction. The college received B Grade status from the National Assessment and Accreditation Council in 2003. A decade later, NAAC elevated the institution to A Grade in their 2014 assessment. The grade was again elevated to A+ by NAAC in their November 2019 assessment.

The main campus of the college is located along the Seaport-Airport Road at Thrikkakara, a town in Kochi suburbs, known for the Vamana Temple. It is 12 km away from Kochi city and Cochin University of Science and Technology, Model Engineering College, Judgemukku and Kochi Civil Station are the important nearby landmarks. It is a coeducational college and 65 percent of the 2650 students are girls. The college is staffed by around 100 teaching staff and 56 non-teaching staff and offers 17 undergraduate and 6 post-graduate courses in the main stream. It houses three research centres in Chemistry, Mathematics and Commerce and is an offcampus of the School of Distance Education of the Mahatma Gandhi University. Bharata Mata School of Legal Studies, Bharata Mata Institute of Management and Bharata Mata School of Social Work are sister institutions of the college, functioning under Bharata Mata Educational Trust.

== Facilities ==
Besides the class room and administrative office complex, the college has an auditorium, Cardinal Parecattil Auditorium, named after its founder. The central library has adjoining conference hall and the computer centre is equipped with a laboratory and internet facilities. A Guidance Bureau, Student's Centre and Counselling Centre operate in the campus as well as a book stall. It has a canteen, phone booth, bank and a Copy centre and the college is fitted with an EPABX system with 50 lines. A fitness centre and Language Laboratory also function in the campus.

== Departments ==
The academics is sectioned into independent departments based on subjects of instruction such as Commerce, English, Malayalam, Hindi, Economics, Mathematics/Statistics, Physics, Chemistry, Botany, Zoology, Computer Science and Physical Education. Self-financing (B.com specialized in Finance&Taxation, Computer, Marketing, Cooperation, Marketing, Travel and Tourism, BBA, BCA, BSW, BSc Psychology, BSc Data science and professional courses (MBA & MSW) are handled by independent departments.

== Curriculum ==
Bharata Mata College offers regular, vocational and research programmes and has two steams, aided and self-financing.

Five year integrated degree course(aided)

- Integrated Master of Science – Computer Science (Artificial Intelligence and Machine Learning)

Three year degree courses (aided)

- Bachelor of Arts – English, Malayalam, Economics
- Bachelor of Science – Mathematics, Physics, Chemistry, Botany and Zoology
- Bachelor of Commerce – Commerce

Three year degree courses (vocational)

- Bachelor of Arts – Malayalam copywriting
- Bachelor of Science – Physics/Computer Applications

Three year degree courses (self-financing)

- Bachelor of Commerce – Travel and Tourism Management
- Bachelor of Commerce – Finance and Taxation
- Bachelor of Commerce – Computer Application
- Bachelor of Commerce – Tax
- Bachelor of Commerce – Computer Application
- Bachelor of Commerce – Marketing
- Bachelor of Business Administration

Four Year Undergraduate degree courses (self-financing)

- Bachelor of Commerce – Finance
- Bachelor of Business Administration
- Bachelor of Social Work
- Bachelor of Computer Applications
- Bachelor of Science - Data Science
- Bachelor of Science - Psychology

Two year master's degree courses (aided)

- Master of Science – Mathematics
- Master of Science – Applied Chemistry
- Master of Commerce – Commerce
- Master of Arts – English

Two year master's degree courses (professional)

- Master of Social Work – Rural and Urban Community Development/Medical and Psychiatric Social Work/Family & Child Welfare
- Master of Business Administration – Marketing Management/Finance Management/Information Systems/Human Resources Management

Research courses

- Research scholarship – Commerce
- Research scholarship - Mathematics
- Research scholarship - Chemistry
- Research scholarship - Physics
- Research scholarship - English

== Co-curricular activities ==
Bharata Mata College has a College Union composed of elected office bearers such as chairperson, vice chairperson, general secretary, university union councillor, arts club secretary, college magazine editor and class representatives. All teachers are members of the union and the principal serves as the honorary treasurer. The union oversees the cultural activities of the college and publishes an annual magazine, Bharatha.

The National Cadet Corps (NCC) and National Service Scheme (NSS) are represented at the college. It also provides opportunity to NCC cadets to appear for national level certificate courses. Student members of the NCC who attend the basic leadership programmes or participate in the Republic Day parade are given 2 percent grace marks and NSS certificate holders get 10 percent grace marks in the university examinations. They are also eligible for 10 percent weightage for admission for higher courses. All India Catholic University Federation (AICUF) has presence in the college which is managed by a chaplain nominated by the principal, supported by other office bearers elected from the students.

The department of physical education oversees the sports activities of the students and the college has facilities for sport activities such as Cricket, Football, Hockey, Basketball and Volleyball. The sports ground has a 200-metre athletic track and the department maintains a fitness centre. The college also maintains student support services such as:

- Google Developers Student Clubs
- Xfinity Gaming Club
- Anti-ragging Cell
- Drama Club
- Dance Club
- Music Club
- Literacy Club
- Campus Ministry
- Women's Cell
- Readers club
- Justice and Legal awareness Club
- Entrepreneurship Club
- Film Club
- Nature Club

== Notable alumni ==
- Kurian Joseph, justice
- Joemon Joshy, actor
- Soman Ambaat, director

== See also ==
- List of colleges affiliated with Mahatma Gandhi University
