= Baselios Paulose =

Baselios Paulose may refer to:

- Baselios Paulose I (1836–1913), Catholicos of the East of the Malankara Orthodox Syrian Church, from 1912 to 1913
- Baselios Paulose II (1914–1996), Catholicos of India of the Jacobite Syrian Christian Church from 1975 to 1996
- Baselios Marthoma Paulose II (1946–2021), Catholicos of the East of the Malankara Orthodox Syrian Church from 2010 to 2021

== See also ==
- Paulose I (disambiguation)
- Paulose II (disambiguation)
