= St. Xavier's College Jaipur =

Jesuit college in Jaipur, Rajasthan, India

St Xavier's College Jaipur
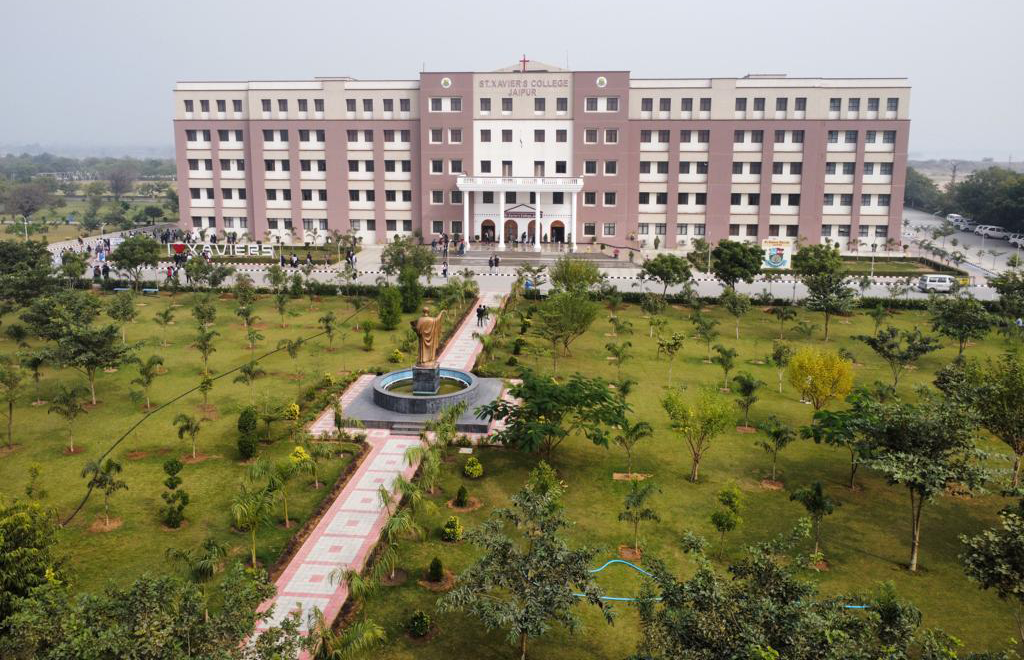
- Motto: Competence, Character, Compassion, meaning Developing competencies, Building character, Creating compassion
- Type: Private, Self-financed
- Established: July 2010
- Religious affiliation: Jesuit (Catholic)
- Academic affiliations: University of Rajasthan
- Principal: Rev Dr (Fr) Arokya Swamy SJ
- Undergraduates: 2000
- Location: Jaipur, Rajasthan, India; 26°48′18.38″N 75°40′37.19″E
- Campus: 30 Acres; rural
- Website: sxcjpr.edu.in

St. Xavier's College Jaipur, is a Jesuit college in the city of Jaipur in Rajasthan, India. It was established in 2010, and is a co-educational, self-financed Catholic minority institution, affiliated to the University of Rajasthan. It offers undergraduate courses in arts, science, management, computers and commerce. The college also offers Master of Arts in English and Economics and Master of Commerce in EAFM and HRM.

== History ==
St. Xavier's College was founded in July 2010 in Jaipur. The Jesuits first came to Jaipur in 1729 at the invitation of Maharaja Sawai Jai Singh II in order to help in setting up an astronomical observatory.

== See also ==
- List of Jesuit Educational Institutions
- List of Jesuit Sites
