= St. Joseph's University, Bangalore =

Jesuit university in Bangalore, India

St Joseph's University, Bangalore
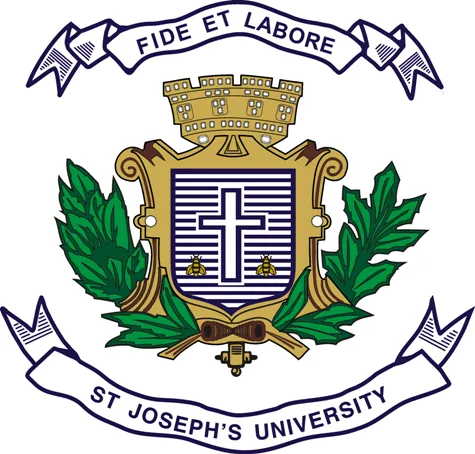
- Latin: Universitas Sancti Iosephi
- Motto: Fide et Labore
- Motto in English: Faith and Labor
- Established: 1882; 144 years ago
- Founder: Missions étrangères de Paris (MEP)
- Religious affiliation: Catholic (Jesuit)
- Academic affiliations: UGC, NAAC, AIU, ACU (pending)
- Chancellor: Dionysus Vaz SJ
- Vice-Chancellor: Victor Lobo SJ
- Academic staff: 300+
- Students: 9800+
- Location: Langford Road Bangalore, Karnataka, India; 12.9629°N 77.5964°E
- Website: www.sju.edu.in
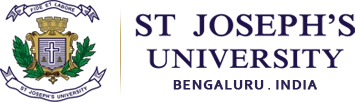

St. Joseph's University is a private aided, Jesuit University run by the Karnataka Province of the Society of Jesus (Jesuits) in Bangalore, Karnataka, India. It was founded in 1882. It offers graduate, post-graduate and research education. It is one of the oldest institution of higher education in Bangalore.

== History ==
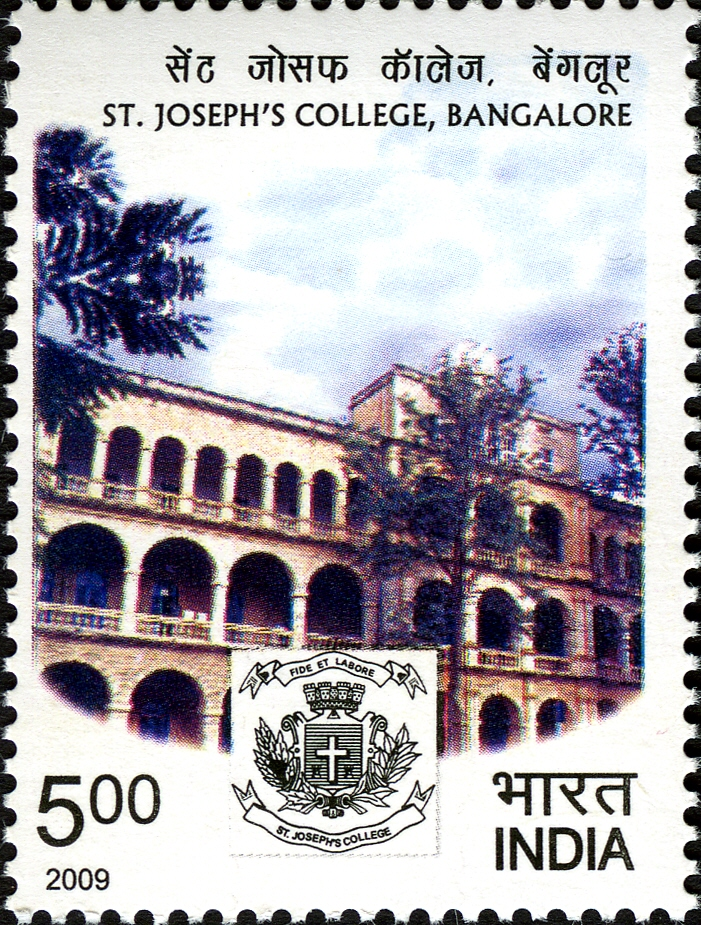
St Joseph's College on a 2009 stamp of India

St Joseph's University is run by a Catholic religious order known as the Society of Jesus (SJ). The members of the Society of Jesus are popularly known as the Jesuits. The origins of the Society of Jesus go back to Saint Ignatius of Loyola, a 16th century Spanish soldier. In 1521, he was seriously wounded in a battle against the French in Pamplona, Spain. Intense prayer over months of painful recuperation prompted a personal transformation. He gave up his military career and became a soldier for Jesus Christ possessed with a single vision of establishing a world of humanity and justice. He found friends who shared his vision and went on to establish the Society of Jesus in 1540.

In 1854, St. Joseph's was set up by Missions étrangères de Paris (MEP) to provide education for the small Catholic community comprising about 1000 Europeans and 5000 Indians. The missionaries started St. Joseph's institution as St. Joseph's European High School.

In 1882, St Joseph's College was started and was affiliated to the University of Madras as a Second Grade College. In 1926 the University of Madras granted the Institution the status of a First Grade College. From 1882 to 1937 the college was under the Missions étrangères de Paris. At the time the college consisted of one building, constructed in 1925, accommodating 350 students.

Following the First World War, it became increasingly difficult for the French Fathers of the Missions Étrangères de Paris (MEP), depleted by the conflict, to continue sending priests to the school. The Bishop of Mysore, Maurice-Bernard-Benoit-Joseph Despatures, MEP, subsequently invited the Italian Jesuits from Venice to assume charge of the institution in 1937. In due course, the Indian Jesuits of Karnataka took over its administration. On 1 June 1937, the management of the college was transferred to the Society of Jesus.

In 1949, following reorganisation of the state of Karnataka, the college was affiliated to Mysore University. In 1967, the college was granted permanent affiliation to Bangalore University. 1972 saw the commerce sections and evening college separated from the main college. In 1982, University Grants Commission recognised the college under 2(f) status of UGC ACT 1956 giving it authority to grant degrees. Further in 1985, University Grants Commission recognised the college under 12(B) of the UGC ACT 1956. In 1986, it became the first affiliated college in Karnataka to offer postgraduate courses. In 1988, it became the first college in Karnataka to get a research center. The college is also one of the early ones to go for NAAC accreditation in 1998 and got a four-star (70–75%).

In 2001 the college moved from the Residency Road campus to new premises in the erstwhile Hostel Campus at the intersection of Langford Road and Lalbagh Road. The pre-university section was separated from the college in 2002 as part of the Karnataka state policy of bifurcation. The college was Accredited by UGC as a college with Potential for Excellence (CPE) on 3 November 2004 and was one of five colleges in Karnataka that was awarded academic autonomy in 2005. The second cycle of NAAC Accreditation conferred 'A' level (Score 85.3%) on 2 February 2006. A commemorative stamp by India Post was released on 1 August 2009. The UGC extended the college's Autonomous Status for the period 2010–2011 to 2015–2016. Yet again the college saw an improvement in its NAAC Accreditation score in the third Cycle with 'A' level and a score of 3.73/4 on 10 March 2012. The college was granted College for Excellence (CE) status by the UGC in 2014. It was granted the status of DST-FIST college in 2015. The UGC once again extended the Autonomous Status for the period 2016–2022. In 2014 the college was cited for its model library facility.

In February 2021, St. Joseph's University bill was presented in the Karnataka Legislative Assembly and was subsequently passed by the Legislative Assembly and Karnataka Legislative Council. The college received its University charter on 2 July 2022. On 27 September 2022, the institution was inaugurated as India's first public-private University by the President of India, Droupadi Murmu.

== University emblem and motto ==
The emblem of an institution is the central representation of the core values which it stands for. Envisioned by the French Foreign Missionary Fathers in 1882, the emblem and motto announce these core values of the institution. The emblem is made up of two scrolls, one scroll is placed above the crown, on which is inscribed the motto of the Institution in Latin – "Fide et Labore" which translated to "Faith and Toil" and on the other scroll is placed beneath the palm leaves which bear the name of the Institution. The shield which bears a cross in the centre is symbolic of Christian faith. There are two bees on either side of the lower part of the cross representing hard and persevering work. The crown, which is placed above the shield, is a heraldic symbol of supremacy and glory. The compartment beneath the shield consists of palm leaves that are a sign of victory. The University motto is 'Fide et Labore' which means ‘Faith and Toil.’ Faith among other things gives persons a commitment to God, to his fellowmen, to intellectual pursuits. Toil is a necessary pre-requisite for success.

== Academics ==
The University has over 9,948 students and more than 430 faculty members. The University offers nationally and internationally recognised undergraduate, postgraduate and research programmes.

School of Business, School of Chemical Sciences, School of Humanities & Social Sciences, School of Languages & Literatures, School of Life Sciences, School of Physical Sciences, School of Social Work, School of Communication & Media Studies, School of Information Technology.

== Ranking ==
St Joseph’s University Bengaluru, India has been awarded with QS I-GAUGE. It is a brand of QS-ERA India Pvt Ltd, a nationwide rating system for universities, colleges, and schools in India. It provides academic institutions with a roadmap to effectively benchmark their performance against key indicators and further establish developmental strategies for upgrading their educational services.

The institution has five main campuses, located in the centre of the Cantonment.

- St. Joseph's College, Bangalore (previously St. Joseph's College of Arts and Sciences)
- St. Joseph's Evening College
- St. Joseph's College of Commerce
- St. Joseph's Institute of Management
- St Joseph's College of Law

St. Joseph's also has three high schools and a stand alone pre-university college.

- St. Joseph's Pre-University College
- St Joseph's Boys' High School (ICSE)
- St. Joseph's Indian High School (SSLC)
- St. Joseph's School (CBSE)

== St. Joseph's Evening College (Autonomous) ==
St. Joseph's Evening College (Autonomous), Bangalore
- Established: 1972; 54 years ago
- Location: Bangalore, Karnataka, India
- President: Fr. Brian Pereira SJ
- Principal: Dr. Paul Newman
- Affiliations: Bengaluru City University
- Website: http://www.sjec.edu.in/

St Joseph's Evening College, Bangalore was established in 1972 as a Jesuit college to empower the underprivileged sectors of Indian society In 2005, it was given autonomous status by the UGC, to devise its own curriculum.

The Evening College is a minority institution and accepts students of all religious denominations without discrimination. It is affiliated to Bengaluru City University and offers three-year BCom, BA, BCA, and BBM degrees and two-year postgraduate degrees in Commerce (MCom), and English.

Currently the college is merged with St. Joseph's University under their third shift (III Shift), whereas the first and the second shifts are for the morning batches.

== St. Joseph's College of Commerce (Autonomous) ==
St. Joseph's College of Commerce (Autonomous)
- Affiliations: Bengaluru City University
- Principal: Fr. Charles Lasrado SJ
- Location: 163, Brigade Rd, Ashok Nagar, Bengaluru, Karnataka 560025, Bangalore, Karnataka, India
- Campus: Urban
- Website: www.sjcc.edu.in

St. Joseph's College was divided in 1972, and commerce section of the college was spun off to Brigade Road while the Arts and Science section remained at Residency Road. The commerce college later split into St Joseph's College of Business Administration (SJCBA).

== St. Joseph's Institute of Management ==
St Joseph's Institute of Management, Bangalore
- Former name: St Joseph's College of Business Administration
- Affiliations: AICTE, University of Mysore
- Location: 28, Primrose Rd, Craig Park Layout, Ashok Nagar, Bengaluru, Karnataka 560025
- Website: http://www.sjim.edu.in

St. Joseph's Institute of Management (SJIM) is a graduate school of business located in Bangalore. It offers a two-year full-time PGDM program and PhD program from the University of Mysore. It is approved by All India Council for Technical Education, New Delhi.

== St. Joseph's College of Law ==
St Joseph's College of Law, Bangalore
- Affiliations: Karnataka State Law University
- President: Jerome S. D'Souza
- Director: Fr. Jerald D'Souza SJ
- Principal: Dr. Pauline Priya
- Location: 18 Cariappa (Residency) Road, Bengaluru, Karnataka 560025
- Campus: Urban
- Website: sjcl.edu.in

St. Joseph's College of Law is a law school in Bangalore which was founded in 2017. It is affiliated to Karnataka State Law University, Hubballi, and approved by the Bar Council of India in New Delhi.

== Cultural and Literary Festivals ==
=== META- The Josephite Festival of Literature ===
The annual Literature festival organised by the Department of English of St. Joseph's College, Bangalore is open to all college students and the general public. Consisting of a plethora of contests, events, talks, panels and performances, META has been a platform to showcase new talents in the college and the city. It began before a decade and has already seen ten editions.

== Notable alumni ==
Arts and Science College

- Sujatha Ramdorai, Mathematician specialising in Algebraic Number Theory, Padma Shri and Shanti Swarup Bhatnagar awardee.
- M.S. Raghunathan, Mathematician specialising in Algebraic Geometry, Padma Bhushan and Shanti Swarup Bhatnagar awardee.
- V. Srinivas, Mathematician specialising in Algebraic Geometry, Homological Algebra and Algebraic K-theory, Shanti Swarup Bhatnagar awardee.
- Vijoo Krishnan, Author, Secretariat committee member of Comminist Party of India (Marxist)
- Kenneth Anderson
- Nafisa Joseph, Indian video jockey and models
- Sri. T.S. Krishnamurthy
- Sri Sri Ravi Shankar
- Dino Morea
- Irfan Razack

Commerce College:

- Rahul Dravid, cricket player and coach
- Shivil Kaushik, cricketer, Gujarat Lions
- Noyonita Lodh, Miss Diva Universe 2014
- Prakash Raj, actor
- Ramya, actress and politician
- Vinay Rajkumar, actor
- Amritha Aiyer, actress
- Salil Shetty, Secretary-General of Amnesty International
- Devdutt Padikkal, Cricket Player

== See also ==
- List of Jesuit sites
- St Joseph's Institute of Management
- St. Aloysius University (Mangalore)
