= St. Joseph's Pre-University College =

Location
- 35, Museum Rd, Shanthala Nagar, Ashok Nagar; Bangalore, Karnataka, 560025; India; 12.9712°N 77.6041°E

Information
- Type: Jesuit, Catholic
- Motto: Fide et Labore (By Faith and Toil)
- Established: 1882; 144 years ago
- President: Rev. Fr. Dionysius Vaz
- Rector: Rev. Dr. Fr. Daniel Fernandes
- Director: Rev. Fr. Joy Rodrigues
- Principal: Ms. Nirmala Raghunandan
- Vice principal: Ms. Mini Saji
- Teaching staff: 130+
- Grades: 11 and 12
- Gender: All male
- Colors: Brown and Black
- Website: sjpuc.in

St. Joseph’s Pre-University College (SJPUC) is an educational institution located in Bangalore, India. The college is managed by the Society of Jesus (Jesuits). Through the Bangalore Jesuit Educational Society (BJES) St. Joseph's executes the objectives of the Jesuit philosophy of education.

While St. Joseph's University, Bangalore, dates to 1882, the pre-university division became independent in 2001 after the Government of Karnataka determined that PU studies would be separate from graduate studies. Graduate studies in science and arts are now the responsibility of St. Joseph's College while graduate programs in commerce are mainly taught by St. Joseph's College of Commerce. There is also an evening division. Also, to accommodate more students who were interested in commerce, graduate studies in commerce have also begun at the St. Joseph's College.

== History ==
The Society of Jesus was founded by St. Ignatius of Loyola in 1540, with a mission and objective of the education of youth around the world with the motto "For the Greater Glory of God". St. Joseph's Pre-University College was founded in 1882 by French Foreign Missionary Fathers to offer a liberal education for the boys of European and Anglo-Indian families. After India's independence, admission was extended in the 1950s and 1960s to include male students irrespective of race, religion or caste. The college was started by the French Foreign Missionary Fathers for the purpose of imparting higher education to youngsters. In 1937, the management of the College was handed over to the Jesuits of Karnataka Province.

== Emblem and Motto ==
The emblem dates from the French Foreign Missionary Fathers in 1882. It consists of two scrolls. The one on top of the crown is inscribed with the motto in Latin, "Fide et Labore" (By Faith and Toil). The scroll below the leaves bears the name of the institution. The shield consists of the cross which is symbolic of the Catholic faith and there are two bees on either side of the cross representing toil / hard work. The crown above the shield represents supremacy and glory while the palm leaves below the shield represent victory.

== The College ==
The college has been recognised by the Government of Karnataka. Education in the streams of Science, Commerce and Arts are provided to students who complete the 10th grade of school and pass the SSLC, ICSE or CBSE exam.

The buildings consist of two blocks. The Main Block houses the office of the administrative and staff offices along with counselling rooms, classrooms and library, while the Loyola Block houses various laboratories, an audiovisual room, parliament room and student council room, along with some additional classrooms. The college has basketball and volleyball courts and a multipurpose astroturf arena which is used for other sports. There is also a multipurpose sand court.

The college encourages students to participate in a lot of extracurricular activities and there are a lot of clubs and associations, which students can join and showcase their skills.

== Cultural ==
The College annually conducts an intra-collegiate fest called "Andromeda", which showcases the talents of the students by means of activities such as quizzes, science models, singing, beat boxing, a fashion parade, etc. An annual inter-collegiate fest called "Equinox" attracts about 5,000 students from across Bangalore. The college promotes extracurricular activities along with academics. It has varied clubs and associations from which to choose. The Student Council, an elected body, represents the Student fraternity and takes up the task to organize the various events for the college.

== Notable alumni ==
- Dino Morea, Indian actor
- Rahul Dravid, Indian cricketer
- Prakash Raj, movie actor (Hindi, Kannada, Telugu, Tamil, etc.,)
- Sabeer Bhatia, Indian businessman who founded Hotmail
- Devdutt Padikkal, cricketer
- Nitin Kushalappa, author
