= Loyola Technical Institute, Madurai =

Coordinates: 9°55′56.96″N 78°6′4.58″E

- Gnanaolivupuram, Madurai, India

Information
- Type: Jesuit, Catholic
- Established: 1952; 74 years ago
- Gender: Coeducational

Loyola Technical Institute, Madurai, Tamil Nadu, India, was founded by the Jesuits in 1952, in the Catholic Archdiocese of Madurai.

Loyola Technical Institute, founded in 1952, is a part of the Jesuit’s Madurai Province.
