= List of colleges affiliated to the Mahatma Gandhi University, Kerala =

Mahatma Gandhi University is a system of universities throughout the Indian state of Kerala. A number of institutes of higher learning can be found within this university system, including those focused on both Engineering and the humanities.

== Engineering ==
Engineering colleges are affiliated to Mahatma Gandhi University, Kerala till 2014-15. From 2015-16 engineering colleges in Kerala state are affiliated to KTU.

1. Adi Shankara Institute of Engineering and Technology, Kalady
2. Adarsh management institute of India, Mumbai
3. Al Azhar College of Engineering and Technology, Thodupuzha
4. Albertian Institute of Science and Technology, Kalamassery
5. Amal Jyothi College of Engineering, Kanjirappally
6. Base
7. Caarmel Engineering College, Pathanamthitta
8. Christ Knowledge City
9. Federal Institute of Science And Technology, Angamaly
10. Government Engineering College, Idukki
11. Gurudeva Institute of Science And Technology, Puthuppally, Kottayam
12. Holy Kings College of Engineering and Technology, Muvattupuzha
13. Ilahia College of Engineering Technology, Mulavoor, Moovattupuzha
14. Ilahia School of Science And Technology, Pezhakkapilly, Muvattupuzha
15. Indira Gandhi Institute of Engineering and Technology
16. Jai Bharath College of Management and Engineering, Perumbavoor
17. KMEA Engineering College, Edathala, Aluva
18. Kottayam Institute of Science and Technology
19. Mahatma Gandhi University college of engineering, Thodupuzha
20. Mangalam College of Engineering, Ettumanoor, Kottayam
21. Mar Athanasius College of Engineering, Kothamangalam
22. Mar Baselios Christian College of Engineering and Technology, Kuttikanam, Idukki
23. Mar Baselios Institute of Technology and Science, Kothamangalam
24. Matha College of Technology, Manakappadi, North Paravur
25. Musaliar College of Engineering and Technology, Pathanamthitta
26. MES College of Engineering, Aluva
27. Rajagiri School of Engineering & Technology, Kakkanad
28. Rajiv Gandhi Institute of Technology, Pampady, Kottayam
29. Saintgits College of Engineering, Pathamuttom, Kottayam
30. SCMS School of Engineering and Technology, Karukutty
31. Sree Buddha College of Engineering for Women, Ayathil, Elavumthitta, Pathanamthitta
32. Sree Narayana Guru Institute of Science and Technology, North Paravur
33. Sree Narayana Gurukulam College of Engineering, Kadayiruppu, Kolenchery
34. Sree Narayana Mangalam Institute of Management & Technology, Maliankara
35. St. Joseph’s College of Engineering and Technology, Pala
36. Vijnan Institute of Science and Technology, Elanji
37. Viswajyothi College of Engineering and Technology, Vazhakulam, Moovattupuzha.
38. Cochin Institute of science and Technology, Moovattupuzha
39. Toms College of Engineering for Startups, Mattakara P.O, Kottayam

== Art and Sciences ==
1. Alphonsa College, Palai
2. Al-Ameen College, Edathala
3. Aquinas College Edakochi
4. Al Azhar College, Thodupuzha
5. Bharata Mata College, Thrikkakkara
6. Bhavans College of Arts and Commerce, Kakkanad
7. Baselios Poulose Second College
8. Baselius College, Kottayam
9. Bishop Abraham Memorial College, Thurithicadu
10. BCM College, Kottayam
11. Bishop Kurialacherry College for Women
12. BPC College Piravom
13. B.V.M holycross college cherpunkal
14. Catholicate College Pathanamthitta⭐
15. Chinmaya College of Arts, Commerce and Science, Tripunithura
16. Cochin College, Cochin⭐
17. College of Applied Science (IHRD), Kattappana
18. College of Applied Science (IHRD), Thodupuzha
19. CMS College, Kottayam⭐
20. DC School of Management and Technology, Vagamon
21. Deva Matha College, Kuravilangad
22. Dewaswom Board College, Thalayolaparambu
23. De Paul Institute of Technology, Angamaly
24. Ettumanoorappan College, Ettumanoor
25. Girideepam Institute of Advanced Learning, Kottayam
26. Government College, Kottayam
27. Government College, Kattappana
28. Government College, Manimalakkunnu, Koothattukulam
29. Government College, Santhanpara
30. Government College, Tripunithura
31. Henry Baker College, Melukavu
32. Holy Cross College of Management & Technology, Puttady, Idukki
33. Jawaharlal Nehru Institute of Arts & Science, Balagram, Idukki
34. JPM College of Arts & Science, Labbakkada, Idukki
35. Kristu Jyoti College of Management & Technology, Changanassery, Kottayam
36. Kuriakose Elias College, Mannanam
37. KG College Pampady
38. KMM College of Arts and Science, Thrikkakara
39. Maharajas College, Kochi⭐
40. MES college, Erattupetta
41. MES College, Nedumkandam
42. Mannam Memorial N.S.S. College, Konni
43. Mar Augusthinose College, Ramapuram
44. Mar Kuriakose College, Puthuvely
45. Mar Thoma College, Thiruvalla
46. Mar Athanasios College for Advanced Studies, Tiruvalla
47. Marthoma College of Management and Technology, Perumbavoor
48. Marian College Kuttikkanam, Idukki
49. MES College Marampally, Aluva
50. MES College, Erumely
51. MES College, Edathala
52. Mount Carmel College, Karukadom, Kothamangalam
53. Musaliar College of Arts and Science, Pathanamthitta
54. Newman College, Thodupuzha⭐
55. NSS Hindu College, Changanassery
56. NSS College Rajakumari
57. Nirmala College, Muvattupuzha⭐
58. Pavanatma College, Murickassery
59. PGM College, Kangazha
60. Parumala Mar Gregorios College, Thiruvalla
61. Morning Star Home Science College, Angamaly
62. PRDS Arts and Science College, Changanassery
63. RLV College of Music and Fine Arts, Tripunithura
64. Rajagiri College of Social Science, Kalamassery
65. Rawther Academy of Arts and Science, Vallana, Erumakkad PO, Pathanamthitta Dist., Near Chengannur
66. SAS SNDP YOGAM College, Konni
67. Santhigiri college of Computer Sciences, Vazhithala
68. Santhigiri Institute of Management, Vazhithala
69. SCMS School of Technology and Management, Kalamassery
70. SNM College, Maliankara, Moothakunnam
71. St. Ephrem Ecumenical Research Institute, Kottayam
72. Siena College of Professional Studies, Edacochin
73. Sree Vidyadhi Raja N S S College, Vazhoor
74. St. Berchmans College, Changanacherry⭐
75. St. Teresa College, Ernakulam⭐
76. St Johns College, Prakkanam
77. St. Dominic's College, Kanjirapally⭐
78. Sree Sabareesa College, Mundakayam
79. St. Johns Institute of Technology, Pathanamthitta
80. St. Mary’s College, Manarcaud, Kottayam
81. St.Paul's College, Kalamassery
82. St. Peter's College, Kolenchery
83. St. Stephen’s College, Uzhavoor.⭐
84. St. Thomas College, Palai⭐
85. St. Thomas College, Puthencruz
86. St. Xavier's College for Women, Aluva
87. St. Xavier's College, Kothavara
88. St. Xavier's College, Vaikom
89. St. George's College, Aruvithura
90. St. Thomas College, Kozhencheri
91. St. Thomas College, Konni
92. St. Kuriakose College of Management and Science, Kuruppampady
93. St. Thomas college, Ranni
94. Seth Ram Bhadhur Singh Gujarati College, mattancherry
95. Swami Saswatheekananda College, Poothotta
96. Union Christian College, Aluva⭐
97. Yeldo Mar Baselios College

== Art Education Centre ==
1. The Institute of Fine Arts

== Teachers colleges ==
1. University College of Teacher Education, Vaikom
2. John Paul Memorial B.Ed. College, Kattappana
3. Titus II Teachers College, Thiruvalla
4. NSS Training College, Changanacherry

== Architecture Colleges ==
1. Asian School of Architecture & Design Innovation, Ernakulam, Kerala
