= Women's Christian College, Kolkata =

College in West Bengal

Women's Christian College
- Motto: ‘By love serve one another’ (Bible, Galatians: 5,13)
- Type: Grant-in-aid undergraduate college
- Established: 19 July 1945; 81 years ago
- Religious affiliation: Bengal Christian Council
- Academic affiliations: University of Calcutta
- Principal: Ajanta Paul
- Location: 6, Greek Church Row, Kalighat, Kolkata, West Bengal, India; 22.51996°N 88.347037°E
- Colours: Yellow
- Website: womenschristiancollege.net

- Location within Kolkata Location within India

Women's Christian College is an undergraduate-level college for women students in southern Kolkata, West Bengal, India. It has been rated as a Grade A college by the National Assessment and Accreditation Council (NAAC), an autonomous organization that evaluates post-secondary academic institutions in India. It operates under the aegis of the Bengal Christian Council, an autonomous interdenominational Christian body, that draws from the best practices of rival Christian denominations in administering educational institutions in West Bengal. In legal terms, it is a Grant-in-Aid college that is affiliated to the University of Calcutta and aided by the University Grants Commission.

== History ==
It was established on 19 July 1945, for the education of Bengali speaking Indian Christians. The founders felt it necessary to have their self-administered college, following the closure of the Diocesan College for women students. The initiative to establish a Christian college for women was taken by Miss Nirajbashini Shome, founder secretary, and Miss Stella Bose, the founder principal of the college. The London Missionary Society allowed the founders to use the ground floor and two rooms on the first floor of the present building for one year free of rent. The intermediate in arts (I.A.) course was started with three students in 1945-‘46 and the figure rose to twenty-two by the end of the session. Calcutta University affiliation for the I.A. course was granted in 1947-‘48 and that for the B.A. course in 1948-‘49. Initially, the Honours Course was extended to Bengali, English, Sanskrit and Economics. The Saroj Nalini Memorial Institution donated furniture to the college while the Sisters of the Oxford Mission, helped with books and furniture. The London Missionary Society building was bought along with six cottah of land in May 1952 for Rs. 30,000/-. The property was augmented by the acquisition of two more premises after seven years. An additional building for the B.A. course classes and an assembly hall were built with the help of the State Government and University Grants Commission. Financial assistance was received from the Methodist Mission, the Baptist Missions and an anonymous donor from the Church of England.

Thus, Women's Christian College came into being neither through state patronage nor through missionary initiative. It was an indigenous educational enterprise that lay great store on imparting value-based education to young women hailing from diverse social, economic and religious backgrounds without discriminating on the basis of caste, creed or class. From the beginning the college has had a small hostel which is a boon for outstation students. Presently the college has three buildings encompassing a chapel, a hostel, a computer training centre, a central library, a seminar hall and an audio-visual room among other facilities.

== Courses ==
The college houses the Arts and Science departments which offer undergraduate (Honours and General) Degree courses in various subjects like English, Bengali, Political Science, Sociology, Education, Philosophy, Sanskrit, History, Geography, Mathematics and Economics. The Distance Education Postgraduate Programmes under the aegis of Netaji Subhas Open University (NSOU) in English, Bengali, Mathematics, Political Science, History, Social Work and English Language Teaching (ELT) are also conducted in this institution. The college is the sole Study Centre in West Bengal for the 2-Year MA Programme and the 1 Year Diploma Programme of the ELT Course under NSOU.

== Departments ==
The college has six arts department, namely Bengali, English, Sanskrit, History, Political Science, Philosophy, Education and Sociology, and three science departments, namely Economics, Geography and Mathematics.

== Infrastructure ==
The college has three buildings – Block A, B and C. It has a Chapel, Hostel, Central Library, Seminar Libraries, Seminar Hall, Audio-Visual Room, Smart Classrooms, Students’ Common Room, Computer Training Centre and Cheap Store.

=== Central Library ===
The Central library is situated in Block C of the college building. Women's Christian College Library was started along with the establishment of the college in 1945.

=== Computer Training Centre ===
The college has a computer training centre which seeks to impart computer proficiency to students. In the first year students are taught the fundamentals of computer, Windows XP, Ms-Office 2007 and HTML. In their second year they graduate to multimedia software such as Photoshop, Sound Forge and Flash and in the third year they are taught Premiere and 3D Max. The centre has two faculty members and technological aid in the form of 16 computers, a television set, and internet.

=== Smart Classrooms ===
These rooms are equipped with a Smart-board, LCD Projector, Digital Visualizer and a Sound System. These rooms are used for small seminars and interactive classes enriched with modern technological audio-visual aids. The seminar hall is equipped with the same technological aids enhancing audio-visual communication.

=== Self-Defence Training ===
The students are trained in Karate and Self Defence Skills and are certified by International Gosoky Ryu Karate Do Association (West Bengal). Self-defence classes are incorporated as a part of the curriculum and held regularly within the college premises following a specific timetable. Participation in the self- defence classes is compulsory for all the students of this college from the year 2012.

== Club and Communities ==
The College has different cells, units and clubs to enable its students to serve the community not only in the educational sphere but also in the areas of women's welfare, environmental issues, poverty reduction etc.

=== National Service Scheme (NSS) ===
The college introduced a National Service Scheme (NSS) unit from the session 2009-10 under zone IV of the University of Calcutta. NSS carries out social services through its regular activities as well as its Special Camp. An orientation programme conducted by Sri Kunal Chattapadhyay, former Superintendent, NSS, (University of Calcutta) along with a talk by Dr. Kanchan Gaba in observance of International Woman's Day were held. In addition to these regular activities the 7-Day annual Camp is duly organized either in February or March in a nearby locality accommodating a large number of under privileged people.

In collaboration with Thare Machi Education which, administrated by a British Charity, operates in parts of Asia and Africa the Alumnae Association of the college held interactive sessions with NSS-volunteers through DVDs on basic life-skills. These values were subsequently communicated by NSS volunteers in the chosen area of their secular ministry in the course of the 7-day camp. The college won the ‘BEST COLLEGE’ Award and the Programme Officer of the Unit won the ‘Best Programme Officer’ Award from the University of Calcutta for the year 2012–13.

=== Eco Club ===
The Eco Club of WCC was started in the year 2009 with the objective of generating awareness among the young students of the college and also to motivate them to spread the message among everybody. The college students create an interesting platform for voicing their views regarding a clean and pollution-free environment. Eco Club regularly organizes Lectures by noted academics/activists on current environmental issues like climate change, usage of renewable forms of energy, wildlife conservation etc. Student volunteers of the Eco Club participate in various Interactive Workshops both within and outside the college campus. Regular Inter-college events such as Poster and Short Film making competitions are organised so as to facilitate an exchange of views and experiences with students from other institutions. The Eco Club encourages its student members to participate in Neighbourhood cleaning operations as part of their social responsibility and commitment towards local people. Some unique achievements of the club are –

- Installation of Rain-water Harvesting Unit on the college roof-top which became operational from September, 2013.
- Creation of Sylvan Street, a beautiful garden in a linear, unused back alley of the college.
- Creation of a Herbal Garden.
- An active Solid Waste Management Programme where kitchen waste is segregated and utilised for making compost.
- Preventing the formation of a local garbage dump and painting of wall graffiti by the students as part of a Beautification Drive by the college Eco Club.

=== Women's Study Cell ===
In keeping with its pledge to respond to social issues the Women's Study Cell was set up with the intention of fostering gender awareness among its students. Primarily an extension of Vikasini, an organization for the dissemination of education among adults and children set up in 1990, which was sponsored by the All India Association for Christian Higher Education (AIACHE) during the initial years of its existence, the Women's Study Cell is dedicated to imparting confidence in impressionable young minds to stand up to gender discrimination, sexual assault and other forms of harassment faced by women in today's society.

The cell operates by organizing workshops and interactive sessions in association with NGO's like Swayam, Sanhita, Thoughtshop Foundation, Jabala etc. Eminent personalities from different walks of life such as academics, medicine and law are invited to make presentations and conduct programmes to help enrich students on various women related issues. The practical and need based approach of the Women's Study Cell is reflected in the regular organization of workshops on self-defence and reproductive health awareness, stressing the urgent need to build up a defence mechanism to overcome the natural vulnerability of the female body.

=== Cine Club ===
The college Cine Club promotes cinema as an art form by organizing screenings of nationally and internationally acclaimed films, hosting guest lectures by film experts, and fostering student appreciation for cinema. Past screenings include works such as Rashomon and The Day I Became a Woman, accompanied by expert analyses of their cinematic techniques.

=== Performing Arts Cell ===
It scouts for extra-curricular talents among the students. Performing arts include, singing, dancing, acting, recitation, script writing, anchoring etc.

=== Guidance, Counselling & Placement Cell ===
This Cell organizes various programmes for the welfare of the students of the college. A free eye screening camp was held by Rotary Narayan Netralaya and both students and staff members benefited from the exercise. In another such programme organized by an NGO, a noted physician spoke about HIV prevention.
The third unit of this cell takes initiatives to -

- Create awareness among students regarding available career options and help them in identifying their career objectives.
- Guide the students in developing skills and job-search strategies required to achieve their career objectives.
- Identify suitable potential employers and help them to achieve their hiring goals.
- Organize activities concerning career planning.
- Act as a bridge between students, alumni and employers.
- Take feedback from industry and provide inputs for curriculum.

A number of IT companies and other service sector units organize campus recruitment in the college. The Cell also takes the initiative of organizing awareness programmes to keep the students abreast of various professional courses which they can opt for to gain a competitive edge in the job market. Through campus recruitment programmes, students have found placement in reputed organizations like Wipro etc.

=== Seminar and Research Cell ===
This Cell has the responsibility to organize the UGC-sponsored National and State-Level Seminars, Departmental Seminars, Special Lectures, Students’ Seminars, Lectures of the Inter-disciplinary Series, Inter-College Seminars etc. It also encourages students and other faculty members to actively participate in State-Level, National and International Seminars and Conferences.

=== Public Relation Committee ===
This unit helps administrator to maintain a positive image of the organization in the community by planning for and monitoring public relations and publicity activities.

=== Internal Complaints Committee ===
The National Policy for Empowerment of Women (2001), Government of India, had emphasized the elimination of discrimination and all forms of violence against women in both the public and the private sphere. Institutions and mechanisms/schemes for assistance are to be created and strengthened for prevention of such violence including sexual harassment at workplace. As per the guidelines of Supreme Court, Sexual Harassment of Women at Workplace (Prevention, Prohibition & Redressal) Act, 2013, an Anti-Sexual Harassment Cell was duly constituted in the college to develop guidelines and norms for a policy against sexual harassment.

- to develop principles and procedures for combating sexual harassment.
- to work out details for the implementation of the policy
- to prepare a detailed plan of actions, both short and long term.
- to collaborate with the Women's Study Cell, Women's Christian College.

== Publications ==
=== Journal ===
Images, the academic journal of the college is an annual publication. It publishes original research work, articles, book reviews in the spheres of Literature, Social Sciences and Science preferably accessible to a broad public. The Principal Dr. Ajanta Paul is the Editor-in-Chief and Sri Kushal Biswas is the Convenor of the Journal Sub Committee.

=== Magazine ===
Srijan, the college magazine, under the editorship of two Senior Professors gives opportunities to the students in creative writing. Contributions by the students as well as the faculty members in English, Bengali and Sanskrit language in the form of Essays, poetry, stories find place in the college magazine.

=== Wall Magazines ===
Udita, edited by Professor Devalina Gopalan and Professor Shomosree Roychowdhury, is the wall magazine for the students (contribution only from students are accepted) where as De-wall, edited by Professor Kushal Biswas, Professor Arnab Mazumdar, Dr. Chandana Mazumdar creates opportunity for the expression of the creative genius of the teachers.

=== Newsletter ===
Panorama, gives a panoptic view of the events and activities of the college, the achievements and ventures of various departments, laurels earned by the students in examinations and various competitions, the work done by the Alumnae Association and a myriad other things associated with the college. Panorama is the outcome of the combined effort by Professor Jayita Mukhopadhyay, Professor Sanchita Gupta and Professor Devalina Gopalan under the editorship of Professor Priyadarshini Sircar.

== Sports and Festivals ==
During the winter season the college holds its annual sports. Students, along with Teaching and Non-Teaching Staff members participate in the event with great enthusiasm. Some events include Breaking the Pyramid, Basketball, Passing the Ball, Ring Toss, Go As you Like, Relay etc. The Chief Guest distributes the prizes at the conclusion of the events. Besides, the College celebrates many events throughout the year, like College Foundation day, Independence Day, Teachers’ Day, Christmas, Reunion, International Women's Day, Earth Day, Sanskrit Bhasha Dibas, World Book Day, World Environment Day, Rabindra Jayanti etc.

== Social Activities ==
WCC indulges in many social activities. Some glimpse are as follows:

- NSS volunteers have been working with the Blind Persons’ Association. Recently they assisted in a Medical Camp in the Sundarbans distributing medicines (under the supervision of a doctor) and blankets to a few of the hapless inhabitants of this region.
- In the 7-Day Annual Camp organized by the NSS the College accommodates a large number of under privileged people from a nearby locality. From organizing classes for the children and teaching them basic life-skills to imparting to them the rudiments of painting the NSS volunteers showed great enthusiasm and commitment in serving the needs of their local environment.
- A neighbourhood cleaning operation and painting of wall graffiti for beatification were performed by the college students as part of their social responsibility and commitment towards surrounding society.

College timing
