= St. Joseph's College, Hassan =

College in Karnataka, India

- Motto: Service, the Light of Life.
- Type: Private university college
- Established: 2009; 17 years ago
- Parent institution: Hassan Jesuit Educational Society (HJES)
- Religious affiliation: Jesuits (Roman Catholic)
- Academic affiliations: Hassan University
- Principal: Dr Maxim Dias, SJ
- Academic staff: 35
- Administrative staff: 10
- Undergraduates: 810
- Postgraduates: 17
- Location: B. Katihalli, Near Dairy Circle, Hassan, Karnataka, India; 13.0154°N 76.0991°E
- Website: www.sjchassan.edu.in

St. Joseph's College, Hassan, is a private Catholic university college located in Hassan, in the state of Karnataka, India. The Christian minority college is managed by the Hassan Jesuit Educational Society (HJES) which also runs other institutions of education in the city. St Joseph's Institutions in Hassan had its humble beginnings in the year 1957 and St Joseph's College was established in the year 2009 and was affiliated to the University of Mysore - one of the premier universities of the state of Karnataka. With the establishment of Hassan University, the college is now affiliated to Hassan University. The college has an enrollment of over 810 in its three bachelor's and one master's degree programmes.

== Courses ==
St. Joseph's College is affiliated with the Hassan University that offers degree programs in Bachelor of Commerce (BCom), Bachelor of Business Administration (BBA), and Bachelor of Computer Applications (BCA) through the college. The college also offers Master of Commerce (M.Com) programme.

== See also ==
- List of Jesuit universities and colleges
- List of universities in Karnataka
