= Loyola College of Social Sciences =

Educational institute in Kerala

Coordinates: 8°32′36.39″N 76°54′45.66″E

- Motto: Fide et Judicium (Latin)
- Motto in English: Faith and Justice
- Established: 1963; 63 years ago
- Religious affiliation: Roman Catholic (Jesuit)
- Academic affiliations: University of Kerala
- Rector: Fr. Sunny Kunnappallil, SJ
- Principal: Saji P. Jacob
- Location: Thiruvananthapuram, Kerala, India
- Website: loyolacollegekerala.edu.in

Loyola College of Social Sciences, accredited with A++ grade in the fourth cycle by NAAC, is a government aided Catholic higher education institution run by the Kerala Province of the Society of Jesus in Thiruvananthapuram, Kerala, India. It was founded by the Jesuits in 1963 and is affiliated with the University of Kerala, offering students the opportunity to pursue a PhD in sociology, social work, and management studies. The college offers five postgraduate programs: MA in Sociology, MSW, MA in Human Resource Management (HRM), MSc in Counseling Psychology, and MSW in Disaster Management. It also conducts two certificate programs: a Certificate in Library and Information Science (CLISC) and a Post Graduate Diploma in Counseling Psychology, in collaboration with the Centre for the Advancement of Counseling and Extra-Mural Education (CACEE), University of Kerala.

The college celebrated its golden jubilee in 2012 with the President of India Pranab Mukherjee as guest of honor.

== Milestones ==
- 1993 – Government of India selects LES for field training under UBSP programme
- 1996 – Government of India recognizes LES as regional Centre for Urban Poverty Eradication Program
- 2007 – re-accredited by NAAC with A Grade, with CGPA of 3.7/4

== See also ==
- List of Jesuit sites
