= Thrikkakara Temple =

Thrikkakara Vamanamoorthy Kshethram
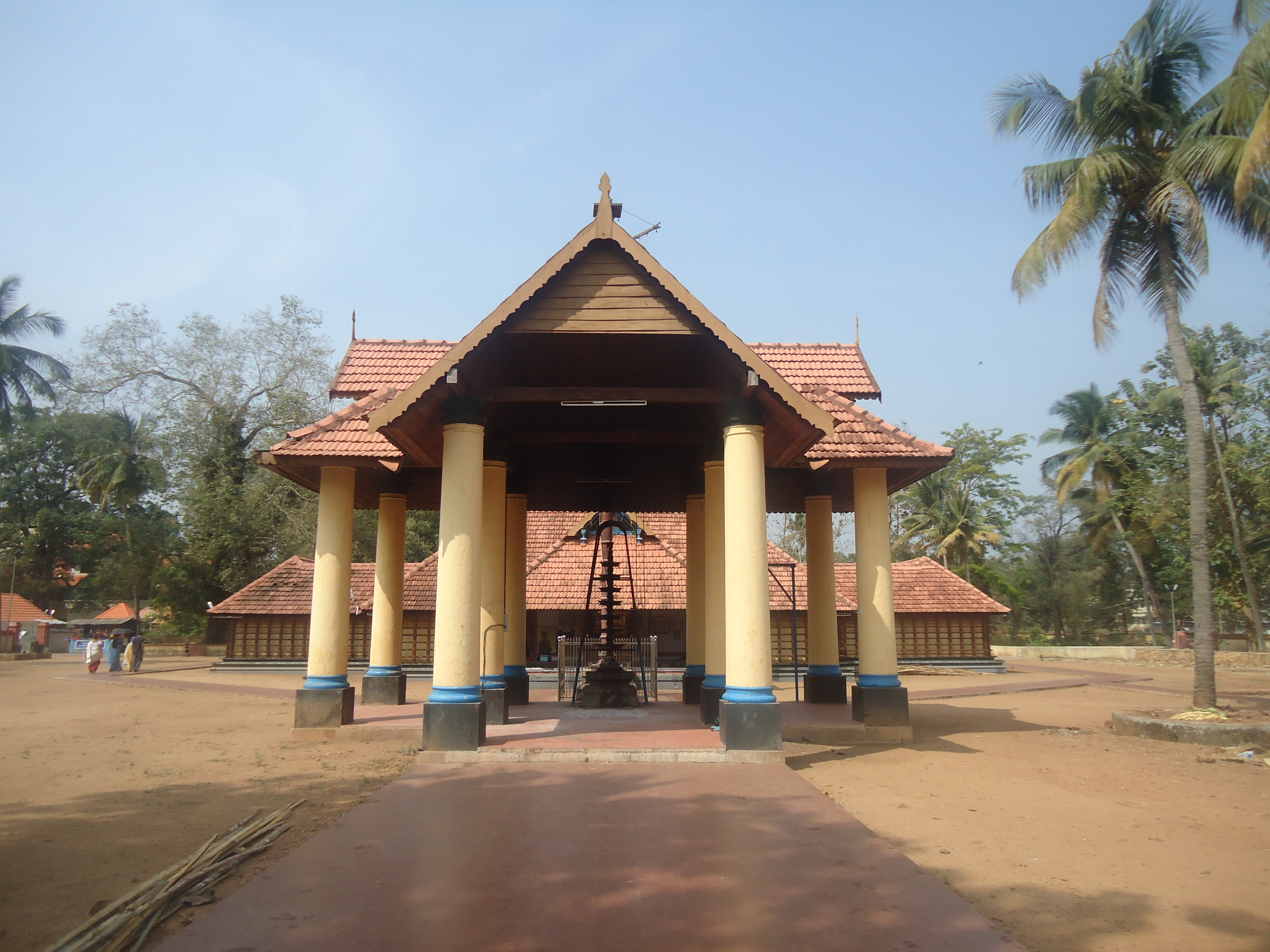
- Thrikkakara Temple Entrance

- Vamanamoorthy Temple, Thrikkakara, Ernakulam, Kerala

Religion
- Affiliation: Hinduism
- District: Ernakulam
- Deity: Vamana (Vishnu), Thrikkakarayappan, Perunchelvanayagi, Vathsalyavalli

Location
- Location: Thrikkakara
- State: Kerala
- Country: India
- Coordinates: 10.0355°N 76.3295°E

Architecture
- Type: Dravidian architecture (Kerala style)

Specifications
- Temple: One
- Elevation: 36.67 m (120 ft)

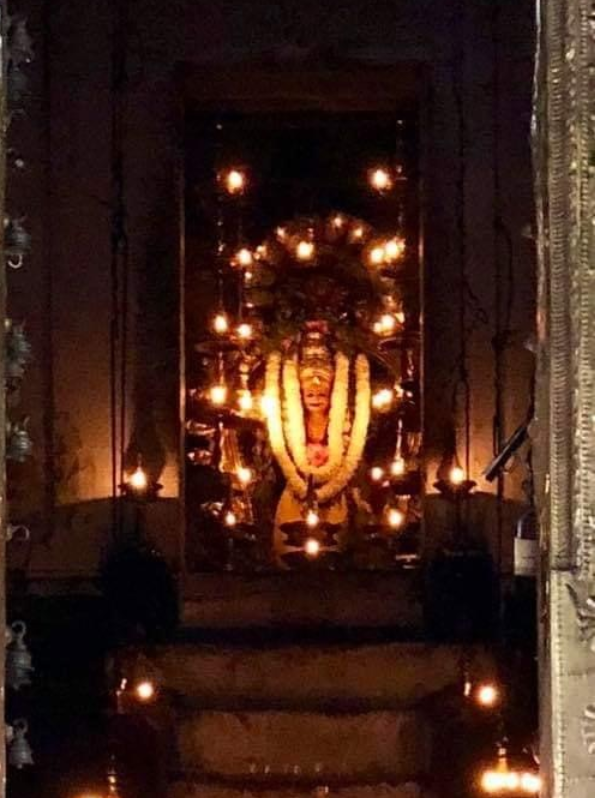
Thrikkakkarappan

Thrikkakara Vamanamoorthy Temple is one of the major Hindu temples in India dedicated to Vamana, a form of the god Vishnu. It is situated in Thrikkakara, Kochi in the state of Kerala, India. The temple is around two millennia old and is also listed as one of the 108 Divya Desams (divine places).

The main temple festival is during the Onam season, which falls on the month of August or September and is the most important event of the religious calendar here. After East India Company and Marthandavarma annexed the territory from Kingdom of Kochi, the Onam festival was jointly organized by the 61 Naduvazhis (local rulers) under the leadership of the Maharaja of Travancore, till India regained independence. Communal harmony continues to be the hallmark of the celebrations, with people belonging to different religions turning out in large numbers for the Onasadya or the Onam feast in keeping with the spirit of the festival. Apart from Onam, the temple also observes important festivals in the Hindu calendar such as Vishu, Makara Sankranti, Navarathri and Saraswati Puja.

== Architecture and deities ==
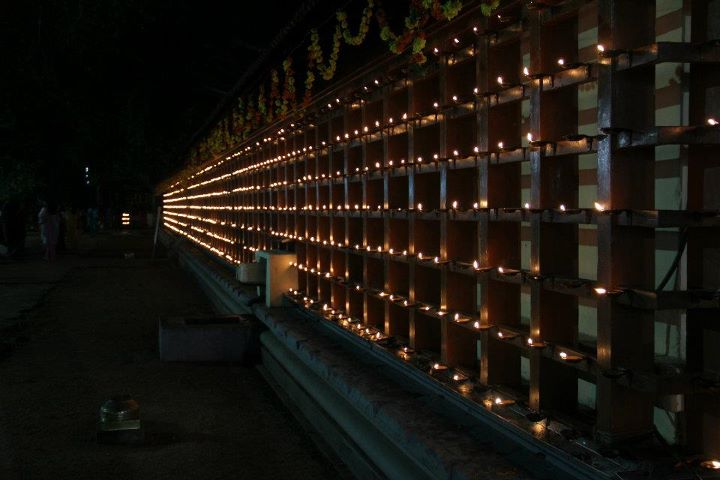
The Chuttu-Vilakku (surrounding lamps) lit up during Onam at Thrikkakara temple

The temple complex, which is enclosed in a large area, holds the main sanctum dedicated to Vamana. The icon of Vamana is depicted preparing to place his foot on the Asura King Mahabali. Parashurama is said to have established the temple. The temple also houses records containing the earliest mention of the celebration of the Onam festival dating to 861 CE. The temple is under the administration of the Travancore Devaswom Board.

The sub-deities of Vamana temple are Bhagavati, Sasthavu, Gopalakrishna, Nāga, Brahmarakshasa and Yakshi. The Brahmarakshasa shrine is located in the outer complex, along with a Banyan-tree god (ആൽദേവത) and the Sarpa Kavu. Surrounding the inner complex walls is a series of thousands of lamps called Chuttuvilakku which translates to 'surrounding lamps'. There are two ponds associated with the temple, one is the Kapilatheertham located closer to the temple on the Northern side of the sanctum sanctorum, and is accessible only to priests. The other pond is located on the Northern side outside the temple walls, and is used regularly during the Aaraattu ceremonial bath of the idol during Onam celebrations.

There is also a Shiva temple beside the main Vamana temple, which was renovated in 2014. It houses idols of the deities Shiva, Ganesha, Karthikeya and Durga. Not much is known about the age and origin of the Shiva temple except that it underwent renovation around a hundred years ago.

Apart from the shrines and ponds, the temple complex houses three stages or halls for cultural performances called Naimishaaranyam, and a temple auditorium at the South-west corner. The auditorium is regularly used for weddings and meeting, and for conducting the Onam feast during the festival.

== Legend ==
The Bhagavata Purana describes that Vishnu descended as the Vamana avataram to restore the authority of Indra over the heavens, as it had been taken by Bali, a benevolent Asura King. Bali was the grandson of Prahlada, the son of Virochana. King Bali was generous, and engaged in severe austerities and penance and won the praise of the world. With the praise from his courtiers and others, he regarded himself as the all powerful in the world.

Vamana, in the guise of a short Brahmin carrying a palm leaf umbrella, went to the king to request three paces of land. Bali consented, against the warning of his guru, Sukracharya. Vamanan then revealed his identity and enlarged to gigantic proportions to stride over the three worlds. He stepped from heaven to earth with the first step, from earth to the netherworld with the second. King Bali, unable to fulfill his promise, offered his head for the third.

Vamana then placed his foot and gave the king immortality for his humility. Upon worshiping Mahabali and his ancestor Prahláda, he conceded sovereignty of Rasatala. Some texts also report that Vamana did not step into the Rasatala, and instead gave its rule to Bali and granting him the boon to become the next Indra. In giant form, Vamana is known as Trivikrama. The legend is associated with the temple and also with Ulagalantha Perumal Temple, Tirukoyilur, Ulagalantha Perumal Temple, Kanchipuram and Kazheesirama Vinnagaram, Sirkazhi.

As per another legend, a rich man who owned a plantain garden, did not get much yield from it. He donated a set of plantain to the temple, after which it started yielding as golden plantains. The groove came to be known as Nentiram Palam. The ruling king became suspicious of the change that it was his wealth in the garden and tortured a sage. The sage cursed the king. The king was afraid and in redemption, he consulted a group of sages. They suggested a thatch of bamboo and created a light with "Koraipul", a grass which helped him redeemed from the curse.

== Onam festival ==
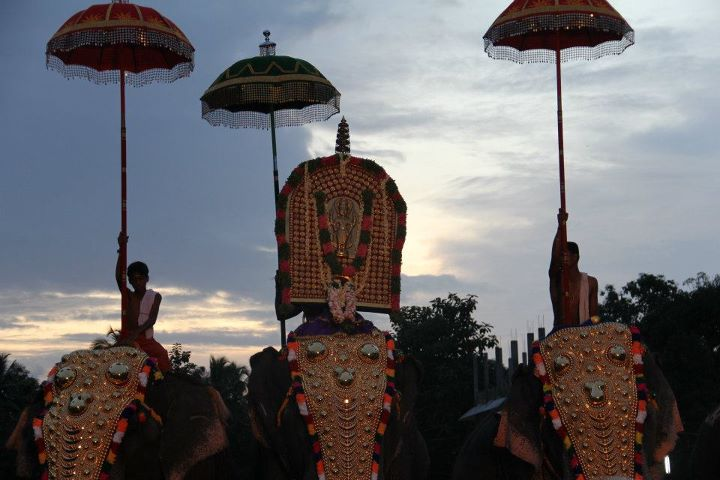
Vamanamoorthy idol in the Aarattu procession at Thrikkakara temple

Thrikkakara temple is considered to be a centre of Onam celebrations, as Thrikkakara is considered to have been the abode of the King Mahabali. The celebration of the Onam festival is the main event in the temple. The festival is celebrated over a period of ten days in the Malayalam month of Chingam. The temple houses the main deity Lord Vamana. During the Onam celebration period, a pyramidal statue idolising Maveli and Vamanan is installed as a symbol of honour at all other sites of the celebration, and named Thrikkakara-appan. The temple is the site at which the king Mahabali is said to have been sent to the netherworld Patala by Vamana with his foot, hence marking the genesis of the Onam festival. The etymology of the name Thrikkakara ('Thiru-kaal-kara' meaning 'place of the holy foot') is also derived this way. Some features of the Onam festival at Thrikkakara are

- Flag-hoisting and lowering: The temple festival begins on the first day (Atham) with the Kodiyettu (കൊടിയേറ്റ്) ceremony, which is a flag-hoisting ceremony common in festivals in temples in Kerala. The festival ends on the 10th and final day, which starts off with a symbolic welcome of the Asura king Mahabali. The closing of the festival is marked with the lowering of the flag and bathing of the idol, referred to as Aarattu (ആറാട്ട്).

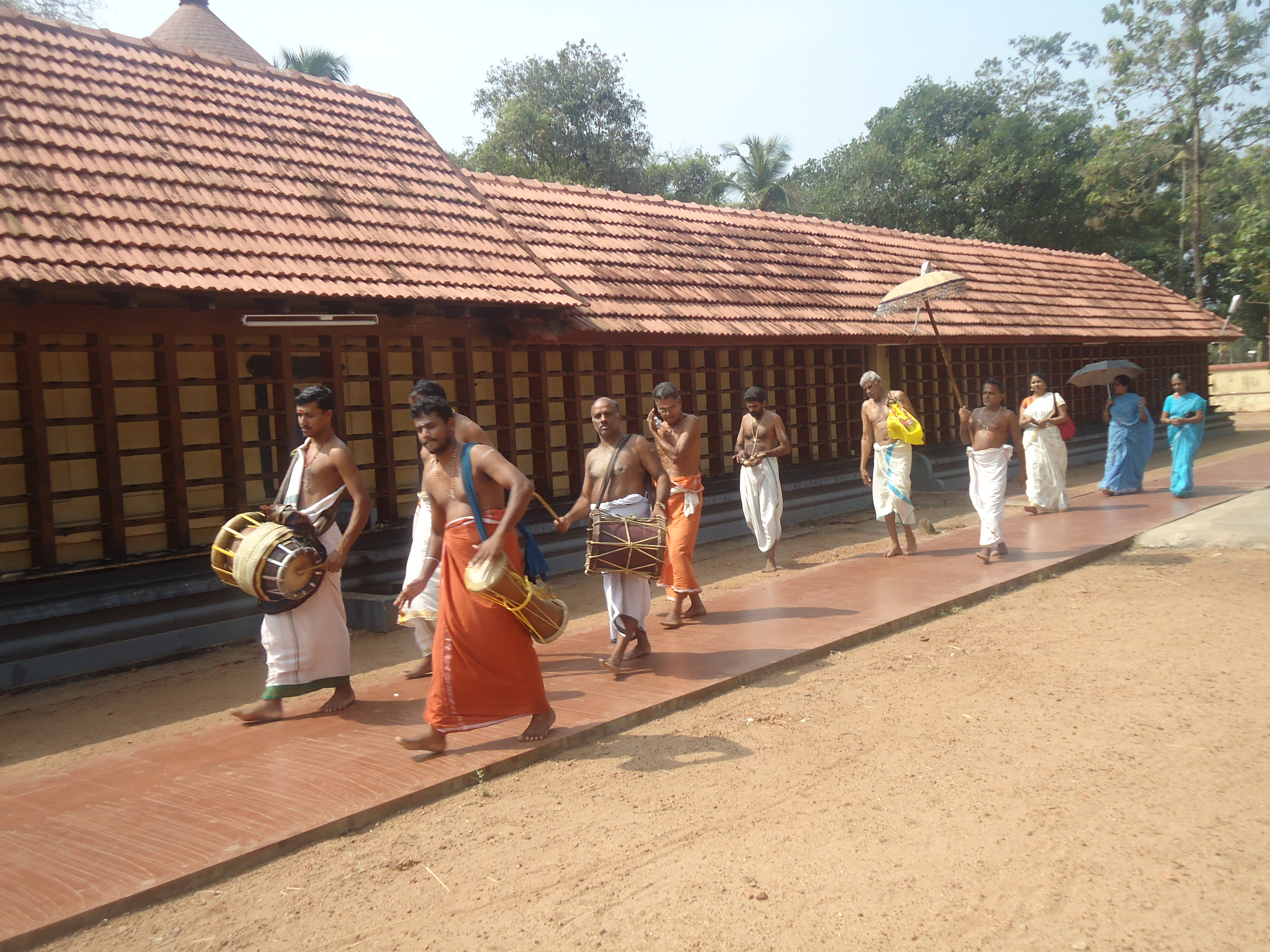
Seeveli at Thrikkakara temple

- Decoration of idol: The Chaarthu (ചാർത്ത്) is a form of decoration of the Vamana idol using mainly sandalwood paste, ornaments and clothing. On each day, the idol is decorated in the form of one of the Ten Avatars of Vishnu, including the Matsya (fish), Kurma (Tortoise), Varaha (boar), Narasimha (half-man half-lion), Vamana, Parashurama, Rama, Balarama, Krishna, Kalki and Trivikrama (another form of Vamana).
- Processions: The Pakalpooram (പകൽപൂരം) is a grand procession held on the penultimate (9th) day of the celebrations. A similar procession, called Seeveli (ശീവേലി), is also held on the final day. The procession involves leading the main deity Vamana on a ceremonial elephant around the temple campus, along with a group of about eight caparisoned elephants and accompanying Panchavadyam. The procession pauses at each of the gates of the temple (East, West, North and South), and proceeds to return the idol back to its inner sanctum. The procession is similar to the one held in festivities at the Guruvayur temple.
- Onam feast: A highlight of the festival is the grand banquet, or Sadya, held on the last two days of the festival at the temple campus. The feast has grown significantly in magnitude each year, and is currently attended by more than twenty thousand people. People belonging to different faiths and religions turn out in large numbers for the sadya in keeping with the spirit of the festival.
- Atthachamayam procession and finale: The festival is flagged off all over Kerala by a grand procession beginning at Thrippunithura near Kochi called Athachamayam (അത്തച്ചമയം). In olden days, the Kochi Maharaja would head a grand military procession in full ceremonial robes from his palace to the Thrikkakara temple.
- Arts performances: During the period of 10 days, the temple showcases performances in several cultural arts such as Chakyar Koothu, Ottamthullal, Kathakali and Patakam as well as dance and musical performances such as Panchavadyam and Thayambaka. Each day also has its own ceremonial significance, and the temple authorities perform several ceremonial rites which involve the main deity and the other deities housed at the temple (namely Lord Ayyapa, Devi, Lord Krishna and Rakshassu). The Shiva temple located beside the main temple is also involved in these rites. In 2015, the Malayali actress Navya Nair presented a dance performance named 'Shivoham' at the temple.

== Gallery ==
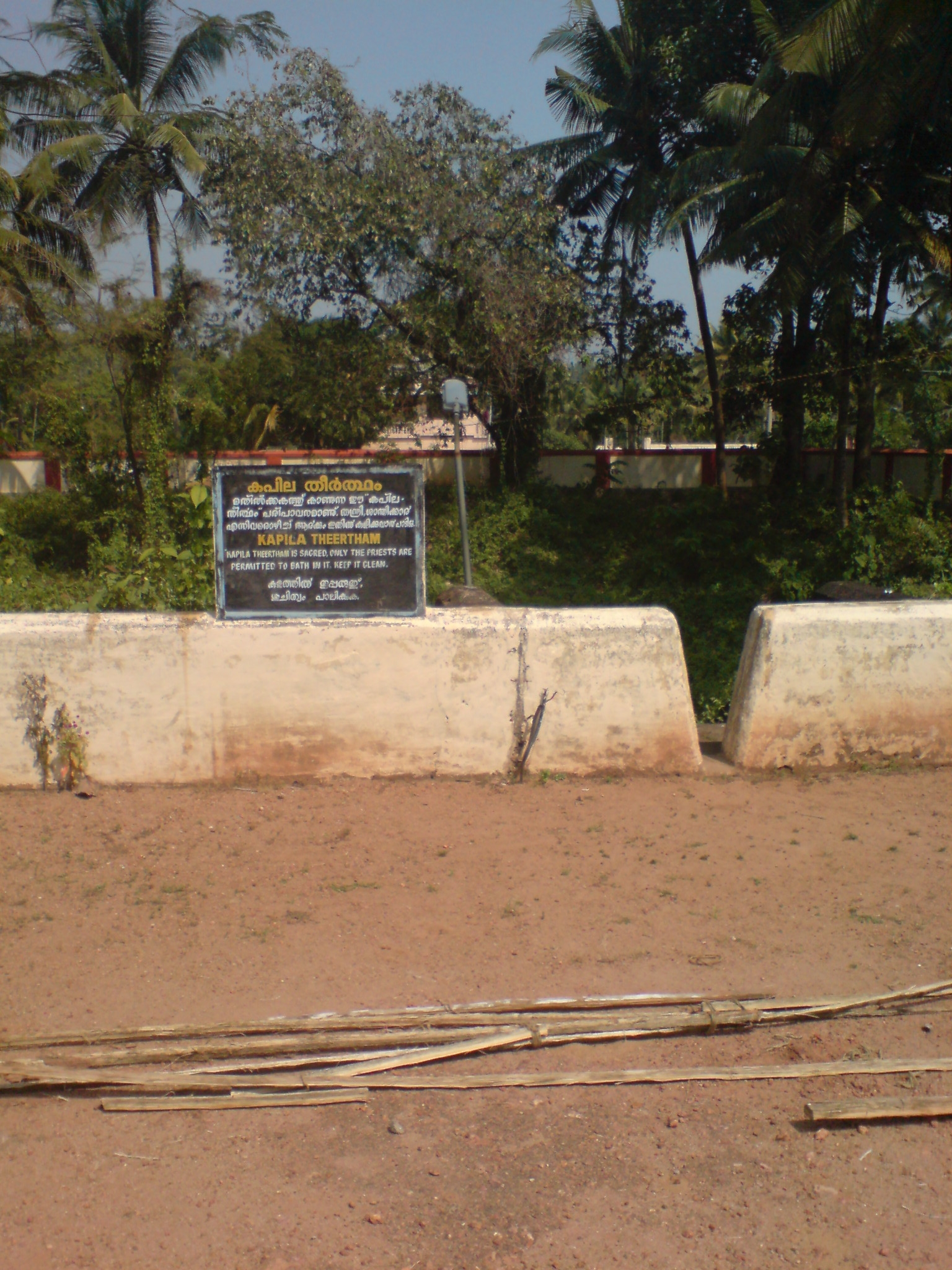
Kapila Theertham (Temple tank)

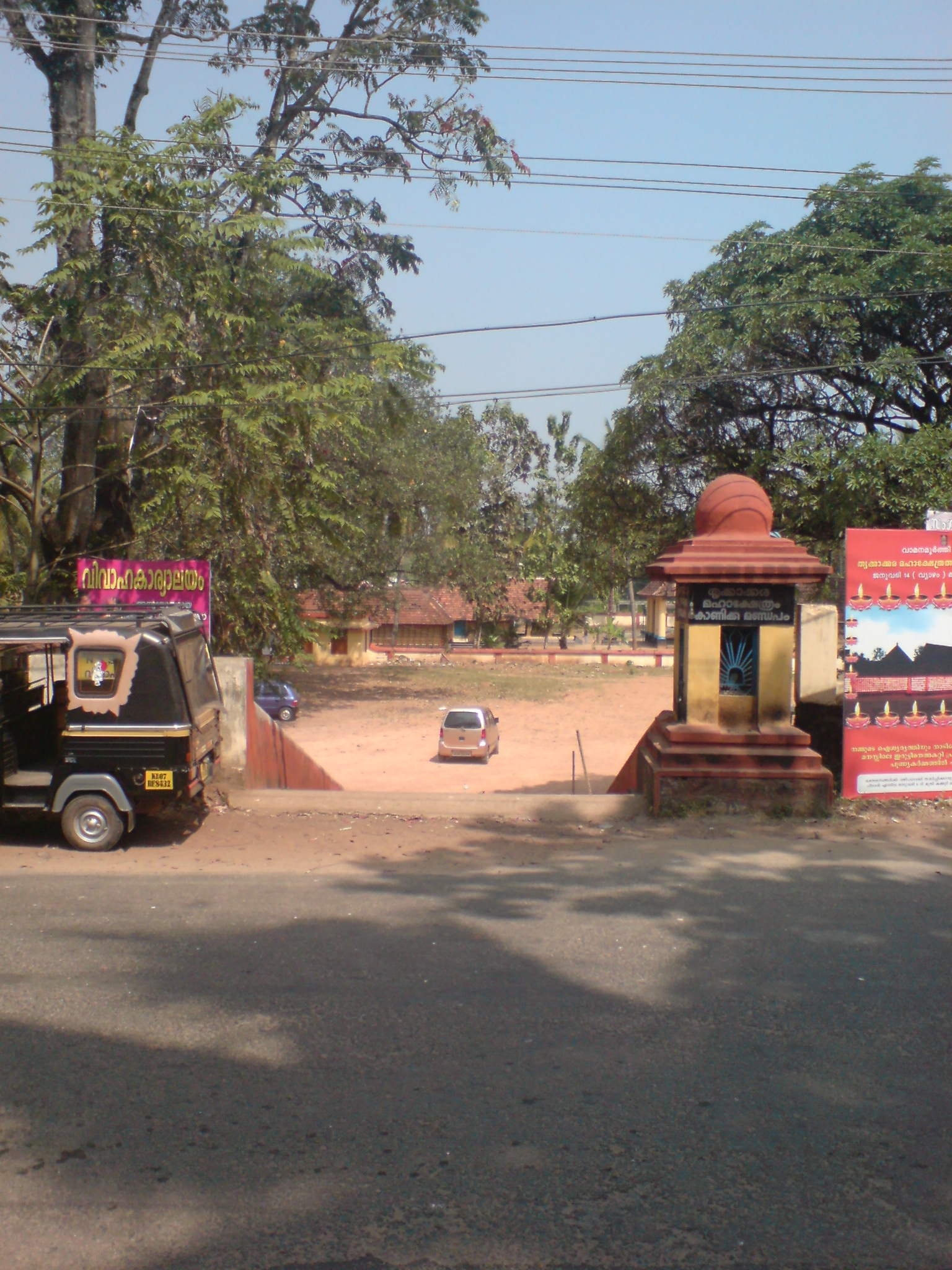
Temple Entrance

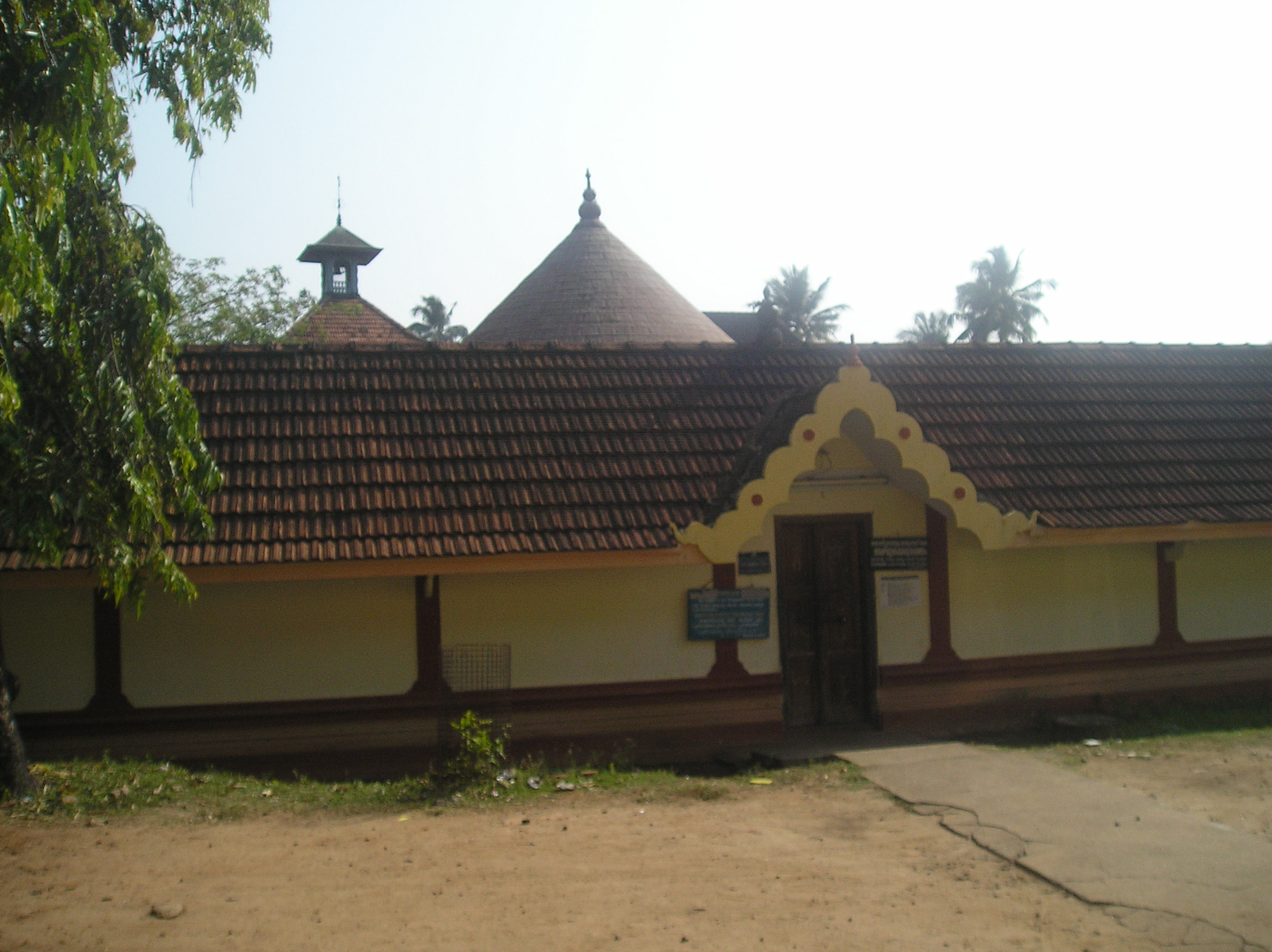
Temple Premises

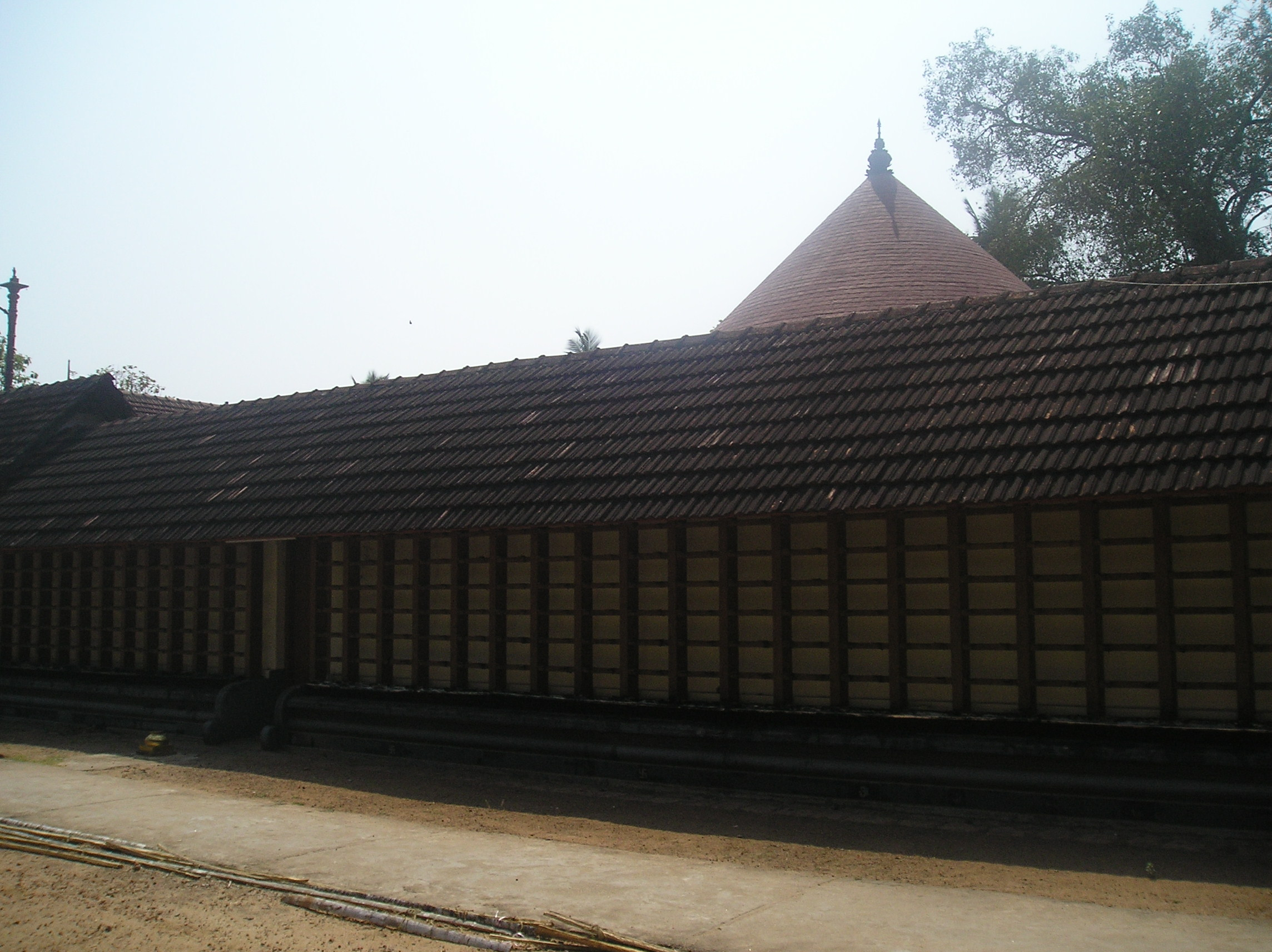
Temple Premises

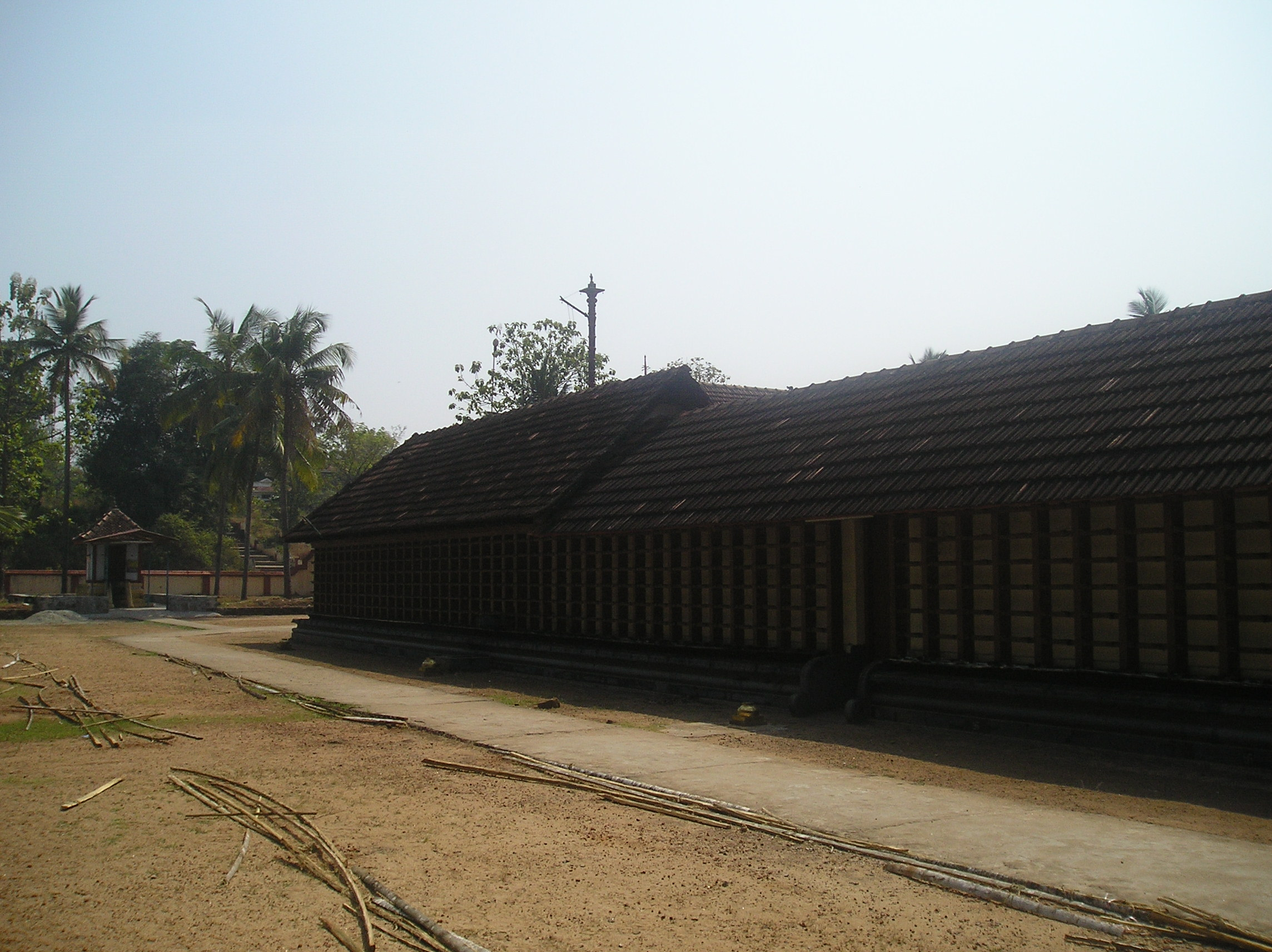
Temple Premises

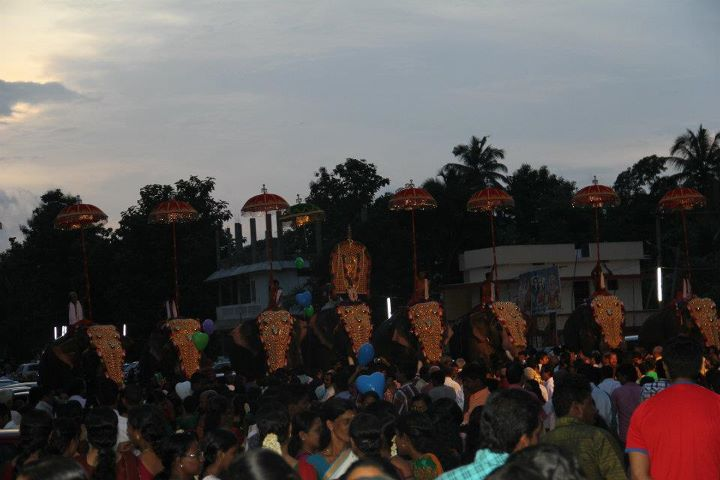
The Aarattu procession at the Onam festival celebrations

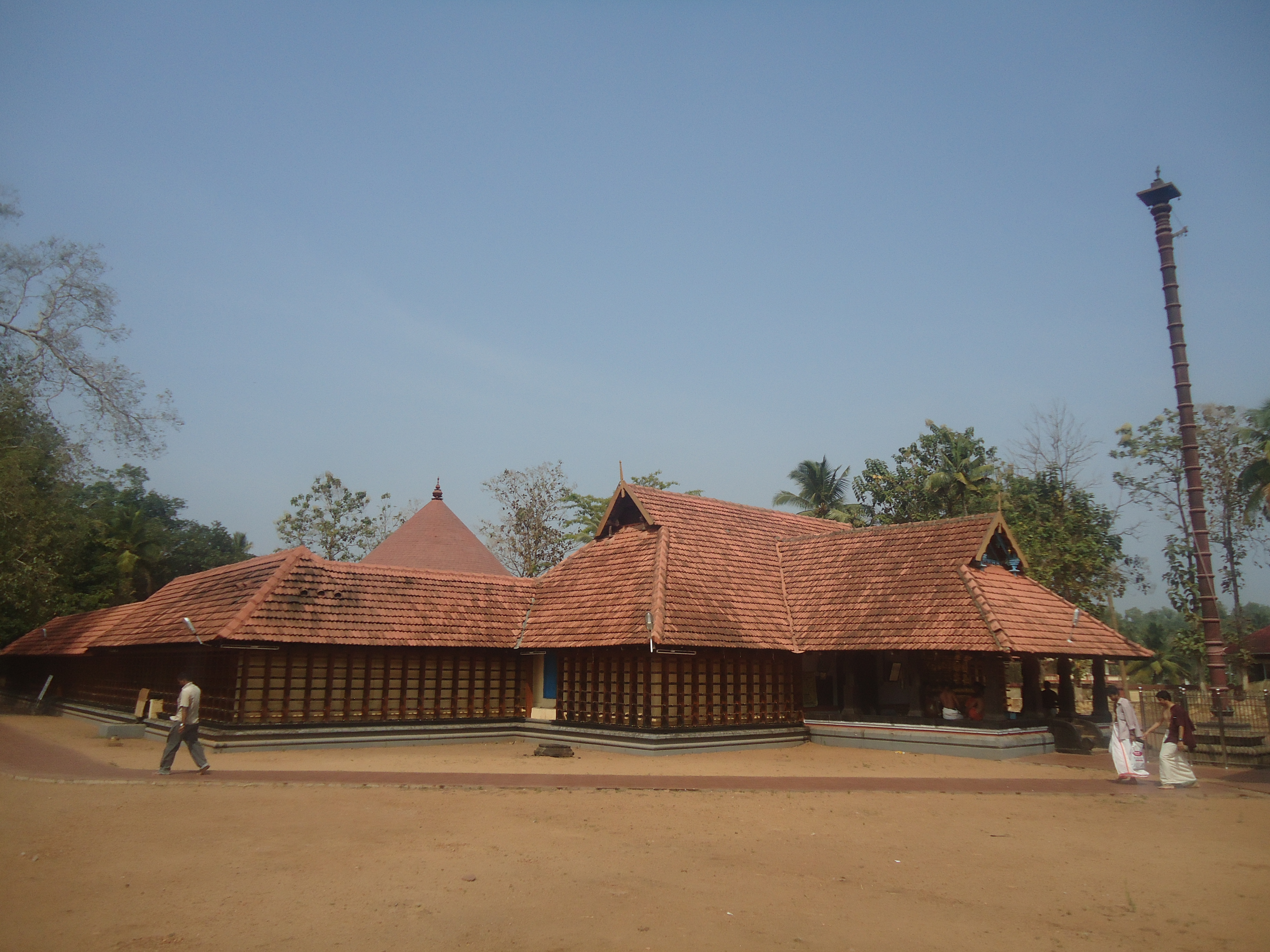
Thrikkakara Temple

== See also ==
- Onam
- Temples of Kerala
- Thrikkakara
