= St. Joseph's Institute of Management, Bengaluru =

Private business school in India

St Joseph's Institute of Management, Bangalore
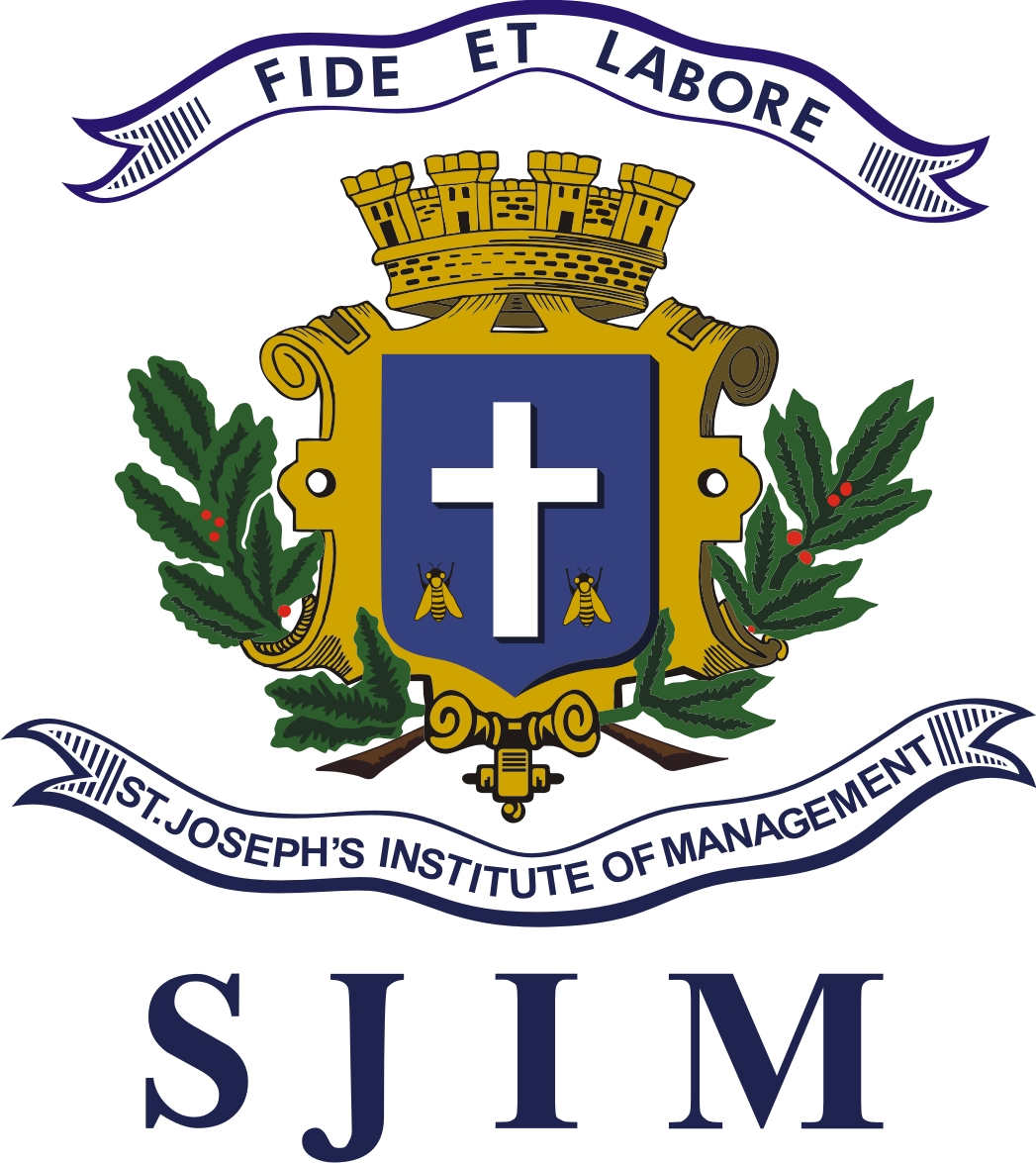
- Former name: St Joseph's College of Business Administration
- Motto: Fide et Labore
- Motto in English: Faith and Labour
- Type: Private business school
- Established: 1968
- Parent institution: St Joseph's University
- Religious affiliation: Roman Catholic (Jesuit)
- Academic affiliations: AICTE
- Academic staff: 18 + 12
- Postgraduates: 360
- Location: 28, Primrose Rd, Craig Park Layout, Ashok Nagar, Bengaluru, Karnataka 560025 Phone No:080 2559 7781
- Language: English
- Website: http://www.sjim.edu.in

St. Joseph's Institute of Management (SJIM) is a private graduate school of business located in Bangalore, India. It is part of St. Joseph's Institutions. It offers a two-year full-time PGDM program and is approved by All India Council for Technical Education, New Delhi. The PGDM program is accredited by National Board of Accreditation (NBA) and is granted equivalence of MBA by AIU.

== History ==
St. Joseph's Institute of Management (formerly known as St Joseph’s College of Business Administration) was established in 1968. It is situated off MG Road, central business district of Bangalore. It is one of the oldest management institutes in the state of Karnataka which is managed by the members of the Society of Jesus called Jesuits.

In 1996, SJIM secured approval from AICTE, New Delhi, for a two-year full-time PGDM program. In 2007, SJIM got approval from the AICTE for offering the Executive PGDM and PGCM programs. The institute was shifted to a new campus located off MG Road, Bangalore in 2016 and it was inaugurated by Mr Rahul Dravid, the former captain of Indian Cricket team who himself was an alumnus of St. Joseph’s Boys’ High School and St. Joseph’s College of Commerce.

On 27 November 2018, SJIM celebrated the Golden Jubilee to commemorate the establishment of the institute in 1968. Shri Pranab Mukherjee, the former President of India was the chief guest at the event.

The institute celebrated the silver jubilee of the commencement of PGDM program on 19 March 2021. Prof Anil Sahasrabudhe, the Chairman of All India Council for Technical Education (AICTE) was the chief guest for the event. The institute prides itself of a student profile with diverse educational background and corporate exposure.

== Academic programs ==
=== Post Graduate Diploma in Management (PGDM) ===
It is the flagship program of the institute of two-year duration. The whole program is broken into six trimesters. Students take up industry internships for eight weeks after the third trimester. The institute offers dual specialization in Finance, Marketing, Human Resource Management and Operations. Specializations are:

Finance and Marketing

Human Resource Management and Finance

Marketing and Human Resource Management

Finance and Operations with Supply Chain Management

Marketing and Operations with Supply Chain Management

Business Analytics and Finance

=== Doctor of Philosophy(Ph.D) ===
St. Joseph’s Institute of Management (SJIM) has been recognized as a Research Centre by the University of Mysore from the academic year 2021-22 onwards. SJIM offers doctoral program in areas like Organizational Behaviour, Commerce, Marketing, Finance, Human Resource Management.

== Rankings ==
In 2018, SJIM was listed among the top three business schools in Bangalore by the National Institutional Ranking Framework (NIRF), behind IIM-B and XIME. NIRF also listed St Joseph's Institute of Management among the top seven in Karnataka, from over forty-five participating institutes.

MBAUniverse.com ranked SJIM 59th in India in 2020.

In 2023, SJIM was listed among top 125 Business Schools in India in NIRF.

CSR GHRDC B Schools Survey 2023 ranked SJIM as a number one among Top B Schools of Eminence in India.

== International collaboration ==
SJIM currently has collaboration with four international institutions.

In 2017, SJIM entered into an agreement with Albers School of Business and Economics, an AACSB Jesuits business school that is part of Seattle University, USA. Joint activities have included guest lectures in SJIM by Albers faculty, research collaboration, and an international business plan competition.

Other ongoing collaborations include those with Fu Jen Catholic University in Taiwan, Advantere School of Management, Spain and Ateneo de Manila, Graduate School of Business in Philippines.

== Memberships ==
SJIM is a member of International Association of Jesuit Business Schools (IAJBS), Xavier Association of Management Institutions (XAMI)., and Association to Advance Collegiate Schools of Business (AACSB).

== Eminent Social Entrepreneur of the Year Award ==
On the occasion of the silver Jubilee of the PGDM program, SJIM has instituted annual Eminent Social Entrepreneur of the Year Award to recognize a sound business model that has impactfully addressed a social or environmental injustice. The 2021 SJIM Eminent Social Entrepreneur of the Year Award was awarded to Teach for India (TFI).

== See also ==
- List of Jesuit sites
