= Karnataka State Law University =

State University in Karnataka

- Type: State Law University
- Established: 2009
- Affiliations: UGC
- Chancellor: Governor of Karnataka
- Vice-Chancellor: Prof. Dr. Ratna R. Bharamgoudar (Actg.)
- Location: Hubli, Karnataka, India; 12°56′19.59″N 77°30′11.45″E
- Campus: Urban 55 Acres
- Website: kslu.karnataka.gov.in

The Karnataka State Law University (KSLU) is an Indian state university in Navanagar, Hubli, Karnataka.

It was established in January 2009 by the government of Karnataka with a campus spread over 55 acres of land. The university offers various undergraduate and postgraduate law courses in subjects such as Constitutional Law, Intellectual Property Rights, Business and Trade Law, Criminal and International Law. It has its jurisdiction over whole of the State of Karnataka.

Prof. Dr. Ratna R. Bharamgoudar is the present vice chancellor (actg.).

== Academics ==
=== Law school ===
KSLU has a constituent law school which was established in 2009. The Law School offers undergraduate, post-graduate and doctoral programs. At the undergraduate level, five-year integrated Bachelor of Arts and Bachelor of Laws (B.A., LL.B.(Hons.)) and Bachelor of Business Administration and Bachelor of Laws (B.B.A., LL.B.(Hons.)) programmes are offered while at the post-graduate level the Master of Laws (LL.M.) programme with specialization in Constitutional and Administrative Law and Corporate and Commercial Laws is offered.

The undergraduate programs are designed as per Bar Council of India Rules.

=== Affiliated colleges ===
As of December 2021, KSLU has more than 100 colleges affiliated to it.

=== Research ===
The university launched a Ph.D. programme in academic year 2011–12 and has 2 research centers. KSLU also runs some journals, where they call for papers on a regular basis.

== Campus ==
KSLU moved into a new building in the campus which was modelled after the architecture of the Supreme Court of India in 2017. The university building is spread over 20 acres in the campus.

It has 20 classrooms with an auditorium that can accommodate 200 people, and an outdoor auditorium with 500 seats.
