= St. Joseph's College of Commerce =

Jesuit college in Bangalore, India

St. Joseph's College of Commerce (Autonomous)
- Motto: Fide et Labore
- Motto in English: Faith and Toil
- Established: 1972; 54 years ago
- Parent institution: St Joseph's University
- Religious affiliation: Jesuit, (Catholic)
- Academic affiliations: Bengaluru City University
- Principal: Fr. Charles Lasrado SJ
- Location: 163, Brigade Rd, Ashok Nagar, Bengaluru, Karnataka 560025, Bangalore, Karnataka, India; 12.9627°N 77.5971°E
- Campus: Urban
- Website: www.sjcc.edu.in

St. Joseph's College of Commerce (SJCC) is a Bengaluru City University-affiliated college operated by the Jesuits. It is autonomous and has an independent examination and recognition system. It is situated in central Bangalore at Brigade Road. The college is ranked 55th among colleges in India by the National Institutional Ranking Framework (NIRF) in 2024.

== History ==
The college traces its history to 1882, when the Missions Etrangeres' de Paris established St Joseph's European High School. Its operations were handed to the Jesuits in 1937 and the Department of Commerce created in 1949. In 1972 St. Joseph's College was divided, with its College of Arts and Sciences and its College of Commerce becoming independent, although both remain under the administration of the Bangalore Jesuit Educational Society. St Joseph's College of Commerce (SJCC) and St Joseph's College of Business Administration (SJCBA) moved to 163, Brigade Road, and St Joseph's Evening College became an independent college.

In 1996 SJCBA started offering two-year, full-time Postgraduate Diploma in Management (PGDM) with recognition from All India Council for Technical Education (AICTE), Govt Of India. By an order of the government Karnataka, the pre-university sections from both St Joseph's College of Arts & Science and St Joseph's College of Commerce were bifurcated to form into one junior College, St. Joseph's Pre-University College.

In 2014 SJCBA signed a MoU to cooperate with the global body of professional accountants ACCA in offering a joint BCom program.

== Student life ==
Intercollegiate fests conducted annually:

- Chanakya - Flagship National level Business Fest
- CIPHER- Intra-college business fest
- Citadel - National Level Business Fest for UG students by the Erudition Club of Department of Commerce
- Spiel - Sports Fest
- Dhwani - Cultural Fest
- Enact - National Level Theatre Fest
- Virtuoso - Business Fest For BBA Students
- Kalarava - Kannada Language Fest
- Turas - Travel & Tourism Fest featuring a myriad of events
- Kalotsav - Intra-college cultural fest
- Animum - Short Film Fest.

== Notable alumni ==
- Rahul Dravid, cricket player and coach
- Shivil Kaushik, cricketer, Gujarat Lions
- Noyonita Lodh, Miss Diva Universe 2014
- Prakash Raj, actor
- Ramya, actress and politician
- Vinay Rajkumar, actor
- Amritha Aiyer, actress
- Salil Shetty, Secretary-General of Amnesty International
- Devdutt Padikkal, Cricket Player

== See also ==
- List of Jesuit sites
- St Joseph's Institute of Management
