= Xavier Institute of Social Service =

Educational institution in India

- जेवियर समाज सेवा संस्थान
- Nurturing professionals with a difference
- Motto: leaven in the dough
- Type: Private management institute
- Established: 1955; 71 years ago
- Religious affiliation: Roman Catholic (Jesuit)
- Director: Joseph Marianus Kujur SJ
- Faculty: Total: 58 (44 full-time)
- Postgraduates: 660
- Location: Ranchi, Jharkhand, India; 23°21′36″N 85°19′12″E
- Campus: Urban
- Nickname: XISS
- Website: www.xiss.ac.in

Xavier Institute of Social Service (XISS) (Hindi: जेवियर समाज सेवा संस्थान (एक्सआईएसएस)) is a Jesuit-run postgraduate management institute in Ranchi, Jharkhand, India. It was established as an extension department of St. Xavier's College, Ranchi, in 1955 by Michael A. Windey with the objective of training young men and women in Rural Development, Personnel Management and Industrial Relations.

In 1963, Micheal Van Den Bogaert was appointed as the director of XISS and rendered his service to the institute for 23 years. In 1973 the institute was registered as a separate educational society under the Societies Registration Act, 1860. In 1978, it moved to its present site.

Xavier Institute of Social Service was established in 1955 as a center for social service at St. Xavier’s College, Ranchi. It was named after the Francis Xavier.

== Academic Programmes ==
Currently, XISS offers the following diploma and certificate programmes:

- Postgraduate Diploma in Management in Human Resource Management PGDM (HRM)
- Postgraduate Diploma in Management in Rural Management PGDM (RM)
- Postgraduate Diploma in Management in Information Technology PGDM (IT)
- Postgraduate Diploma in Management in Finance PGDM
- Postgraduate Diploma in Management in Marketing PGDM (Marketing)
- National Stock Exchange of India (NSE) Certified Capital Market Professional (NCCMP)

The institute has collaborated with UNICEF to launch a Knowledge Management Resource Centre (KMRC) with a view to build a knowledge base for women and children-related issues in Jharkhand.

== Student Activities ==
Panache

Panache is the annual cultural and management fest at the institute, usually held in February. It comprises competitions and events in which students of all the colleges of the city can participate.

== Alumni ==
The institute is known in the corporate world for its Post Graduate program in Rural Management and Human Resource Management with leading multinationals and Indian companies coming for campus interviews.

== See also ==
- List of Jesuit sites
