= Thrikkakkara =

Thrikkakara
- Municipality In Kochi
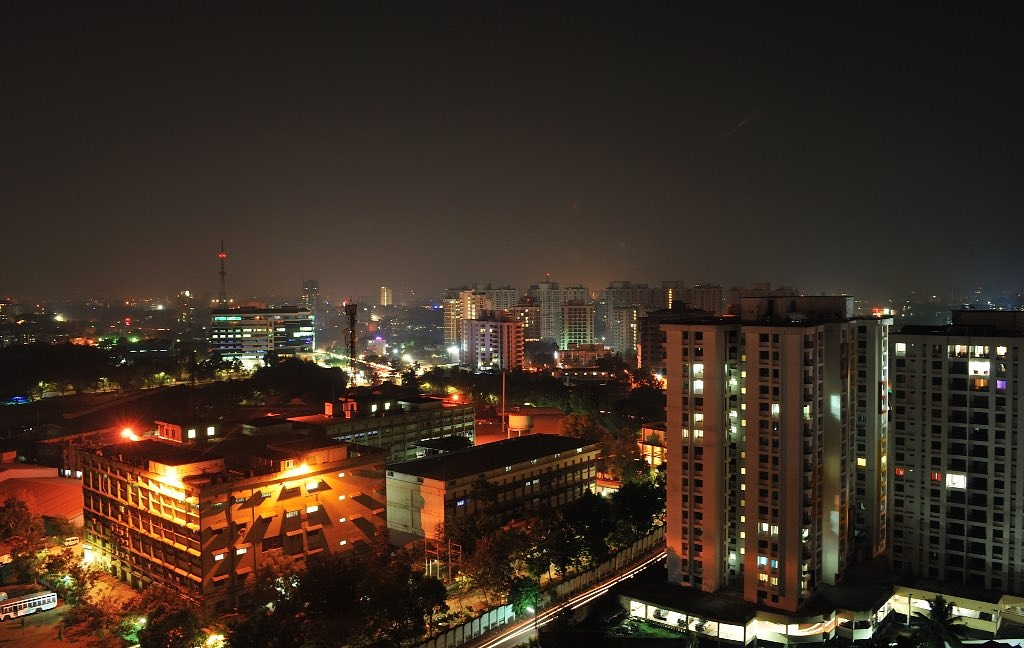
- Kakkanad, major business centre in Thrikkakara Municipality at night
- Interactive map of Thrikkakara
- Coordinates: 10.035°N 76.329°E
- Country: India
- State: Kerala
- District: Ernakulam

Government
  - Type: Municipal council
  - Body: Thrikkakara Municipality
  - Chairperson: TBD (UDF)
  - Deputy Chairperson: TBD
- Municipal wards: 48

Area
  - Total: 28.01 km^{2} (10.81 sq mi)

Population
  - Total: 77,319
  - Density: 2,760/km^{2} (7,149/sq mi)

Languages
  - Official: Malayalam, English
- Time zone: UTC+5:30 (IST)
- Postal code: 682021
- Vehicle registration: KL-07
- Nearest city: Ernakulam
- Website: thrikkakaramunicipality.lsgkerala.gov.in/en

Thrikkakara (Malayalam pronunciation: [t̪r̥ik:aːkaɾa]) is major industrial and residential region in the city of Kochi in Kerala, India. It is located 6.6 km (4.1 mi) east of the Kochi city centre. In administration it comes under Thrikkakkara Municipality as per 2011 Indian census, has a population of 77,319 people.

A major industrial and technological hub, Thrikkakara is home to the Cochin Special Economic Zone, Kochi InfoPark, and the Kochi SmartCity. The Thrikkakara Temple is famous for its legends and celebrations associated with the festival of Onam. The development of Kakkanad in recent years has led to rapid economic growth and further integration of the municipality with the wider Kochi metropolitan area.

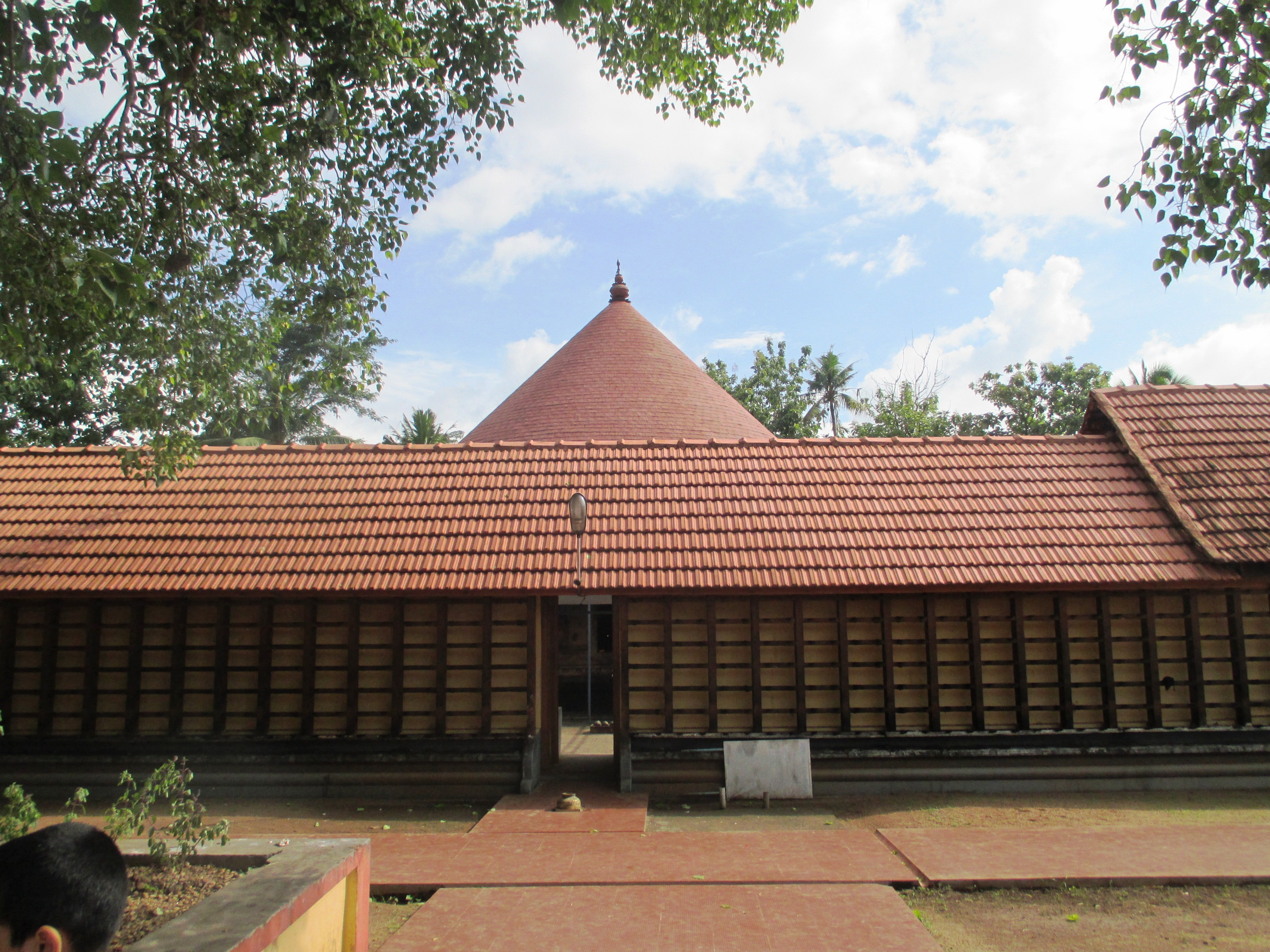
Thrikkakara Vamanamoorthy Temple is one of the few Hindu temples in India dedicated to Lord Vamana/Vishnu.

== Etymology ==
The name Thrikkakkara is an evolved pronunciation of the word Thiru Kaal Kara, meaning the place of the holy foot. This connects to the tale behind the festival of Onam, by which, this is the place on which Lord Vamana set his foot to push down Mahabali to the 'lower world' Pathalam (also referred to as Suthalam). There is a place named Pathalam about 7 km from this place in the same district.

Following from the legend of Onam, Thrikkakkara is home for the associated shrine, the Thrikkakara Temple, where the deity enshrined is Vamana. It is one of the very few Vamana temples in India. Thrikkakara temple is considered to be the centre of Onam celebrations worldwide. The festival is largely attended by thousands of people from all religions. The Onam festival is celebrated here in a colourful manner as a festival spanning over ten days. Devotees contribute money for public feasts. A large number of mobile shops make it a trade fair. A notable fireworks show is held towards the end of the celebration. Thrukkakkara was in Travancore state, 61 naduvazhis jointly organise the Onam festival under the leadership of the Maharaja of Travancore. Ananthapadmanabhan, the title holder is Chempil Arayan Ananthapadmanabhan Valiya Arayan, participated the festival with the Maharaja of Travancore.

== Civic administration ==
Thrikkakara is a major suburb of the city of Kochi. It is governed by the Thrikkakara Municipality, which was established on 30 November 2010 and is divided into 48 wards. Each ward elects one councillor, and together they constitute the municipal council. The municipality is headed by a Chairperson and a Deputy Chairperson, who are elected from among the councillors.

In the 2025 local body elections, the UDF won 26 seats, the LDF secured 15 seats, and other independents won 7 seats. With a majority in the council, the UDF formed the government.

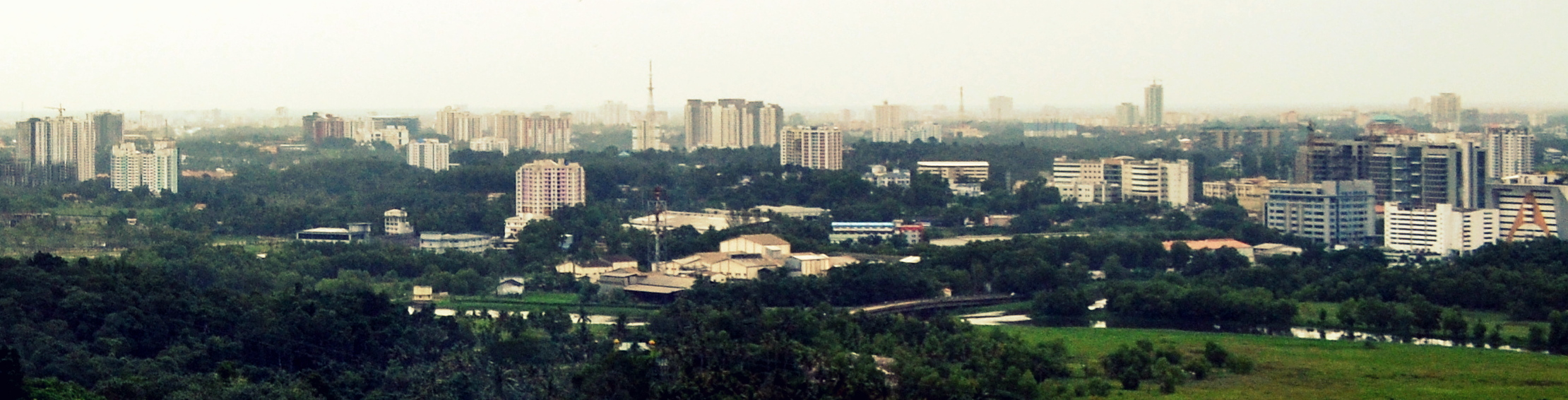
Kakkanad skyline in 2011

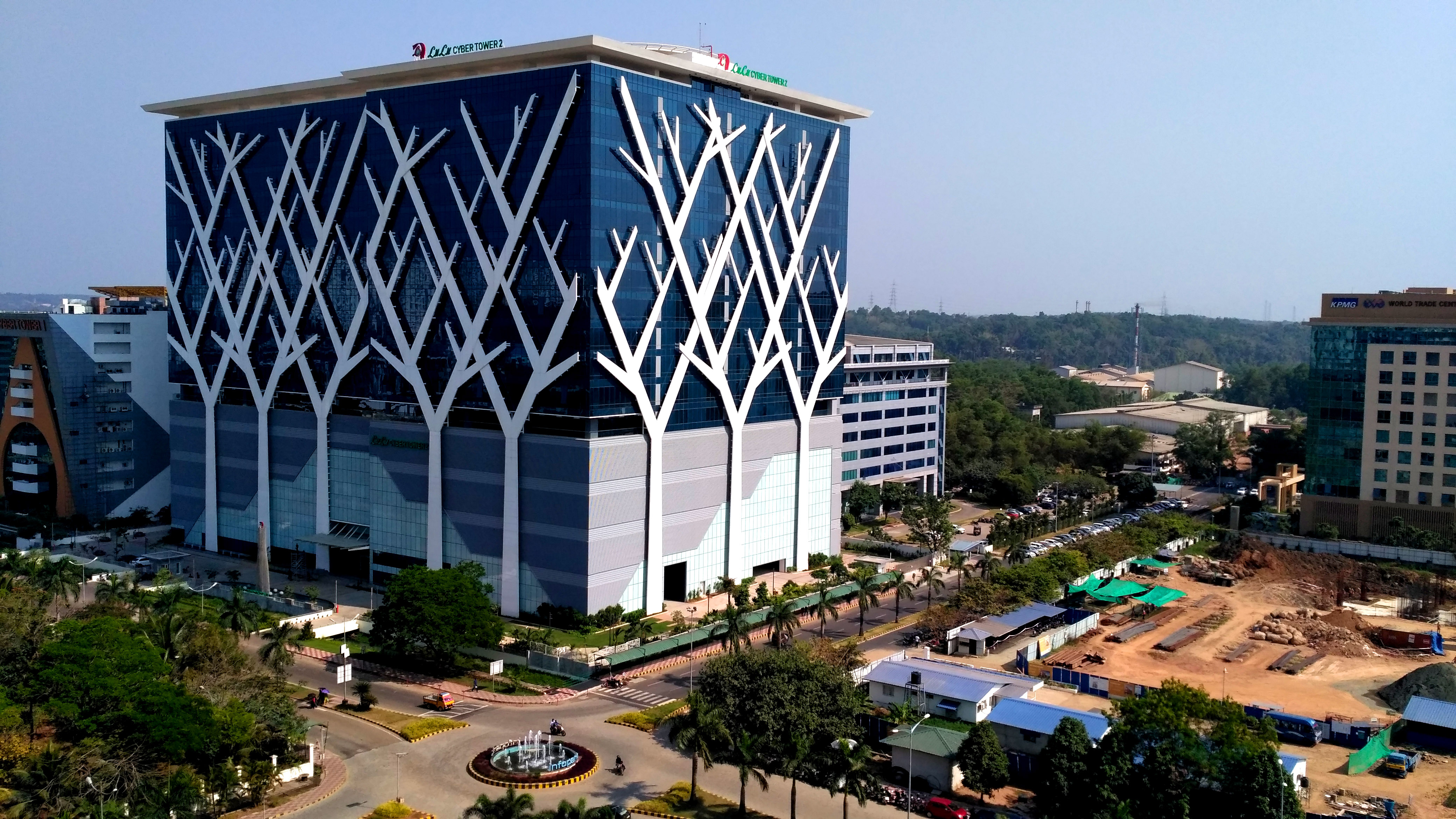
Lulu Cyber Tower 2

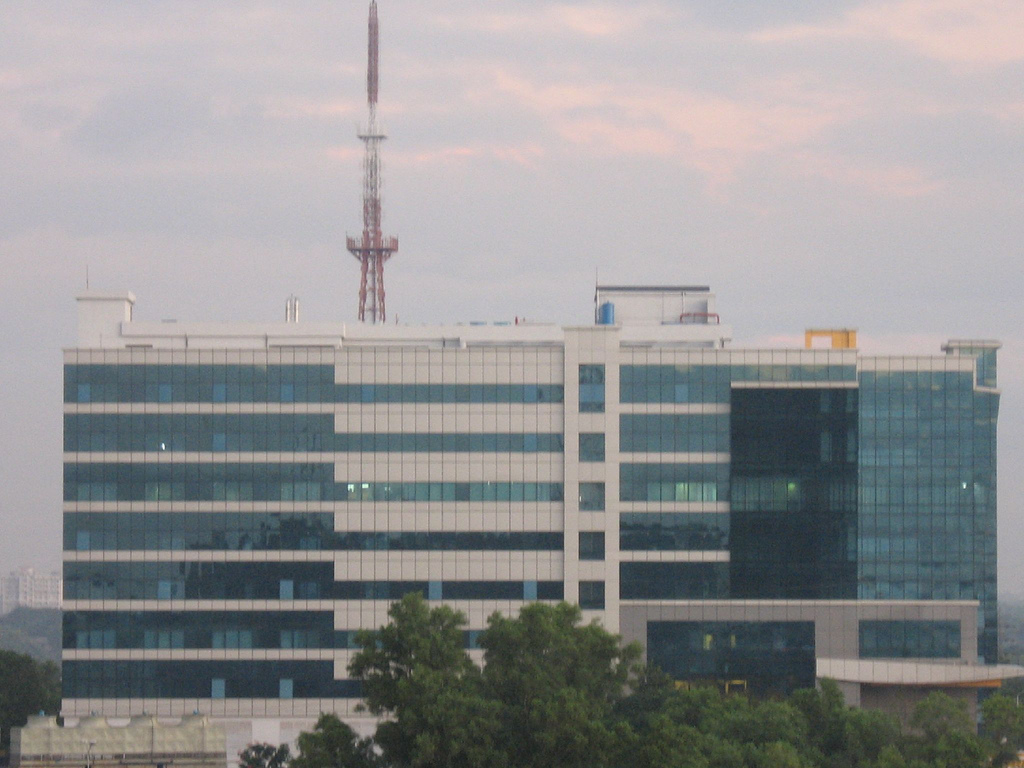
Info Park, Kochi

== See also ==
- Thrikkakara temple
- Model Engineering College
- Bharata Mata College
