= Administrative and bureaucratic delays in India =

The Indian bureaucracy faces persistent slowness, procedural complexity, and multi-layered approvals required under various laws and rules. Apart from the delay in citizen-facing services, governments in India face delays in projects initiated by themselves. The phenomena are largely attributed to the legacy of the colonial-era administrative apparatus and post-independence “Licence Raj”, which continues to impact citizens and businesses. Successive governments in India have pursued strategies to reduce administrative delays with mixed results. The subject has been studied from several perspectives: economists have measured its costs in lost outputs and investment, political scientists and anthropologists have examined its social and distributive effects, and public-choice theorists have examined the incentive structures that sustain it.

== Background ==
=== Colonial legacy ===
India's bureaucratic framework is rooted in the administrative and legal institutions established under the British Raj. Anthropologist Bernard S. Cohn has argued that colonial law functioned not merely as an instrument of order but as “a cultural project of knowledge and power” through which the colonial state redefined Indian society and legitimised its rule. After independence, India kept the colonial structure of the state largely intact, including civil-service structures that had primarily been designed for revenue extraction and control rather than for facilitating commerce or providing services to citizens.

=== Licence Raj ===
After independence, India adopted a state-led development model that included an extensive licencing regime, commonly called the “Licence Raj”. The system required government permits for firms to start, expand, or diversify production with authorities in charge of allocating capacity, foreign exchange, and import quotas. Economists have argued that the government policies from the mid-1950s led to the balance-of-payment crisis in July 1991.

=== 1991 liberalisation ===
Licence raj in India was substantially—though not completely—dismantled following the 1991 crisis. In July 1991, the Congress government, led by P. V. Narasimha Rao and the then finance minister Manmohan Singh abolished industrial licensing for most sectors. Despite reforms, many licencing and inspection requirements persist at the state and municipal level, in addition to accumulated regulations in multiple sectors.

== Theoretical frameworks ==
Scholars have given several distinct explanations for the persistence of administrative delays in India.

=== Weberian theory ===
Sociologist Max Weber's model of an “ideal-type” administrative apparatus—characterised by formal selection, hierarchy, written rules, specialisation, impersonality, and authority vested in the office rather than the office-holder—has been compared and analysed by several scholars. The focus of these studies tends to be measuring the gap between formal written rules and the day-to-day practices of Indian bureaucracy.

=== Anthropological perspectives ===
Anthropologists have offered ethnographic accounts for bureaucratic delays, noting that delays and dysfunction in the delivery of basic entitlements are a form of “structural violence” against the poor, regardless of the intentions to reach this outcome.

=== Public-choice and rent-seeking ===
Public choice theorists have argued that bureaucratic delays result from rational actors expending real resources. As a licence, permit, or quota could give a competitive advantage to an individual or firm, officials who control access to them have an incentive to extract value from individuals and firms that seek the privilege. Thus, delay is used as a pressure tactic to extract higher rents. In this perspective, bureaucratic delays are not byproducts but structural features that increase the bargaining power of the officials.

=== Political economy and “flailing state” ===
Economist Lant Pritchett has popularised the description of India as a “flailing state”, in which highly capable political and administrative “head” could ensure fair elections, conduct nuclear tests, and launch interplanetary missions, but remains disconnected from the “arms and legs” of routine implementation, such as issuing a driving licence, providing basic services, policing, etc. As the state is unable to control the implementation machinery for policies, delay becomes a routine issue. It has also been argued that administrative delays and dysfunction stem from “premature imitation,” described as the transplantation of a complex, discretionary-heavy regulatory framework, similar to that of developed countries without adequate state capacity.

== Manifestations ==
Administrative delays in India manifest themselves both in obtaining general government services and in essential government functions and projects. The sub-indicator in the Rule of Law Index 2025 in the 'regulatory enforcement' category—“administrative proceedings are conducted without unreasonable delay”—ranks India 0.4 out of 1. Making the country rank 98 out of 143 countries on this parameter.

=== Judicial pendency ===
The Indian judiciary is notorious for delays, the National Judicial Data Grid shows over 5 crore pending cases in local courts in India. The pendency is High Courts is close to 65 lakh cases. As of August 2026, there are over 10,000 cases pending in the Supreme Court of India that are older than 10 years. Across high courts, over 80,000 cases have been pending for over 30 years.

=== Infrastructure projects ===
According to the 486th Flash Report on central sector infrastructure projects costing over ₹150 crore (US$16 million), published by the Ministry of Statistics and Programme Implementation (MoSPI) in April 2026, infrastructure projects worth ₹42 lakh crore (US$440 billion) are running behind schedule. In July 2026, Hideki Makihara, a former Japanese minister, blamed Indian authorities for delays in completing India's high-speed rail corridor backed by funding from Japan—the largest donor of bilateral aid to India. India's Ministry of External Affairs dismissed the criticism as an "individual opinion" that differed from "facts".

=== Business approvals ===
In July 2026, private airport operators alleged that the Bureau of Civil Aviation Security (BCAS) was taking considerable time to process security vetting, ranging from one week to the longest time of 802 days to approve the creation of a central kitchen at Terminal 2 of Bengaluru's Kempegowda International Airport. In August 2026, the Indian Express reported that Elon Musk's Starlink received an operator licence from the Department of Telecommunications three years after the application. Delays in statutory clearances and right-of-way acquisitions are considered major hurdles in India's energy transition.

== Impact ==
=== Economic impact ===
MoSPI, in an April 2026 report, noted that the delays across 1,981 large infrastructure projects, defined as projects worth ₹150 crore (US$16 million) or more, would cost the government ₹5.66 lakh crore (US$59 billion) more than the original sanctioned cost, with the highest cost increase of 447% in the Polavaram irrigation project on the Godavari River in Andhra Pradesh. An association representing 14 private airport owners complained that BCAS delays were affecting project implementation schedules. In April 2026, Reuters reported that Indian banks had halted imports of silver and gold because of delays in obtaining government clearance, leaving tons of precious metals stuck at customs and threatening supply shortages.

=== Human right concerns ===
Inordinate delays in the criminal trial process in India affect the fundamental rights of under-trial prisoners, who are incarcerated but have not been formally convicted by a court of law. According to the National Crime Records Bureau, 73% of India's prison population comprises undertrial prisoners, and two-thirds of them belong to scheduled caste, scheduled tribe or other backward communities. Over 60% of 3,71,000 undertrial prisoners have completed only secondary education, and over 30,000 have been imprisoned for over 3 years without trial.
