= National Judicial Data Grid =

Indian judicial database

National Judicial Data Grid, also known as NJDG, is the official database of the Indian judiciary which acts as the repository of case related data for all courts within the territory of India i.e. the Supreme Court of India, High courts, District courts and Taluka courts. It is updated on daily basis and hence, it provides near real time data. It tracks pending cases and is intended to provide transparency in the functioning of judicial system by making data available to public. The system is operated under the supervision of the eCommittee, Supreme Court of India in coordination with the Department of Law & Justice, Government of India.

== History ==
The NJDG was developed in the year 2015 as a part of the eCourts Mission Mode Project on the basis of “National Policy and Action Plan for Implementation of Information and Communication Technology (ICT) in the Indian Judiciary - 2005” submitted by the eCommittee, Supreme Court of India in coordination with the Department of Law & Justice, Government of India. NJDG was specifically part of the “Phase-II” of this Action Plan. It was inaugurated by the then Chief Justice of India, Justice Madan B. Lokur, since the CJI also acts as the Patron-in-Chief of the eCommittee. On 19 September 2015, for the very first time, NJDG was launched for the District courts of India. Subsequently, on 3 July 2020, it was launched for the High courts of India. During the COVID-19 pandemic, the use of NJDG increased significantly as Indian courts had to adopt digital tools whenever and wherever possible for case management, monitoring, as well as hearings virtually. In recent years, NJDG has further been connected with other digital judiciary related tools including the Case Information System (CIS) and e-Filling services.

== Structure and Usage ==
NJDG is described as a Management Information System (MIS) that collects case related information from all the courts including Taluka courts, district courts, high courts, and also the Supreme Court of India (since 2023). The court level case data is entered through CIS (Case Information System) software used and open exclusively for courts only. The CIS data is further synchronized with NJDG on daily basis for keeping the whole system, live and updated. NJDG is further synchronized with other eCourts digital features like e-Filling system, case data systems. NJDG and these digital features are publicly accessible and is frequently used by lawyers, case parties, litigants. The dashboard is primarily used for stats reports and not for case management primarily. However, it indeed uses the Case Information System for displaying the case data in the dashboard. NJDG is used to assess pendency of cases and track court and its functioning by publicly publishing the stats of case pendency and disposal (by the courts) across the country. The data provided in it is considered reliable when compared to other sources and its data is also used in legal studies, news reports, journals and books.

== Features and data classification ==
NJDG dashboard provides several features. It allows filtering of data of cases by jurisdiction, case type, case number, court/judge-wise, pendency status, disposal status, age (of case) wise and registration wise. It further allows comparison of data for judicial workload, case pendency, disposal and clearance rates across other contemporary courts. The data in the dashboard are in tables, graphs, and number formats. Pending cases are further categorized into short-term, medium-term and long-term pending cases. It also allows comparison of data including case clearance rates and backlog across different Taluka courts, District courts and High courts as well as creation of data-based reports for the same and data from CIS.

== Onboarding of Supreme Court of India in 2023 ==
On 14 September 2023, Justice Dhananjaya Y. Chandrachud, the then Chief Justice of India announced the onboarding of the Supreme Court of India in the NJDG portal. This decision was taken years after most of the other courts were onboarded during the Phase-II.

== See also ==
- eCourts Mission Project
- Pendency of court cases in India
- Judiciary of India
- Supreme Court of India
- High courts of India
- District courts of India
