= Adalath =

An Adalath (Hindi: अदालत) is a court in India. It could refer to:

- Indian Supreme Court
- High Courts of India
