= National Litigation Policy =

National Litigation Policy is formulated by the Ministry of Law and Justice of the Government of India to bring down the litigation from government agencies by making them more responsible in filing cases.

== Background ==
The litigation process is lengthy and time-consuming in India. In 2010, 2.5 crore (25 million) legal cases were pending at various levels of the judiciary across the country.

== Salient features ==
The salient features of the policy are

1. To ensure government agencies being responsible while filing cases.
2. It instructs to place correct facts, all relevant documents before the court/tribunal and not to mislead them.
3. Pending cases with government as party to be reviewed on priority basis to enable quick disposal.
4. Proposed a monitoring and review mechanism to sensitize government in important cases and avoid delay and neglect of the same.

== See also ==
- Digital India
- Internet of Things
- E-courts In India
- Online dispute resolution
- Judiciary of India
