= Dhananjaya Y. Chandrachud =

Chief Justice of India from 2022 to 2024

DY Chandrachud
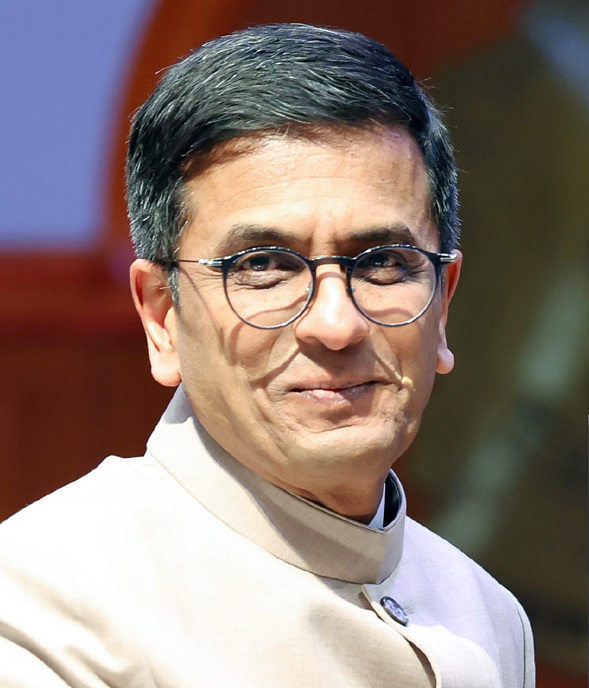
- Chandrachud in January 2024

50th Chief Justice of India
- In office 9 November 2022 – 10 November 2024
- Appointed by: Droupadi Murmu
- Preceded by: Uday Umesh Lalit
- Succeeded by: Sanjiv Khanna

Judge of the Supreme Court of India
- In office 13 May 2016 – 8 November 2022
- Nominated by: T. S. Thakur
- Appointed by: Pranab Mukherjee

44th Chief Justice of Allahabad High Court
- In office 31 October 2013 – 12 May 2016
- Nominated by: P. Sathasivam
- Appointed by: Pranab Mukherjee
- Preceded by: Shiva Kirti Singh
- Succeeded by: Dilip Babasaheb Bhosale

Judge of the Bombay High Court
- In office 29 March 2000 – 30 October 2013
- Nominated by: Adarsh Sein Anand
- Appointed by: K. R. Narayanan

Personal details
- Born: Dhananjaya Yeshwant Chandrachud; 11 November 1959 (age 67) Bombay, Bombay State (present–day Mumbai, Maharashtra), India
- Spouse(s): Rashmi Chandrachud (died 2007) Kalpana Das
- Children: 4
- Parent: Y. V. Chandrachud (father)
- Education: University of Delhi (BA, LLB); Harvard University (LLM, SJD)
- Dhananjaya Y. Chandrachud's voice Justice Chandrachud's lecture at Bombay High Court on Why Constitution Matters; Recorded December 2018

Dhananjaya Yeshwant Chandrachud (born 11 November 1959) is a retired Indian jurist, who served as the 50th Chief Justice of India from 9 November 2022 to 10 November 2024. He was appointed a judge of the Supreme Court of India in May 2016. He has also previously served as the chief justice of the Allahabad High Court from 2013 to 2016 and as a judge of the Bombay High Court from 2000 to 2013. He also served as the ex-officio Patron-in-Chief of the National Legal Services Authority and the de facto Chancellor of the National Law School of India University.

The second child of India's longest-serving chief justice, Y. V. Chandrachud, he was educated at Delhi University and Harvard University and has practised as a lawyer for Sullivan & Cromwell and in the Bombay High Court.

He has been part of benches that delivered landmark judgements such as the electoral bond scheme verdict, 2019 Supreme Court verdict on Ayodhya dispute, privacy verdict, decriminalisation of homosexuality, Sabarimala case, same-sex marriage case and on revocation of the special status of Jammu and Kashmir. He has visited the universities of Mumbai, Oklahoma, Harvard, Yale and others as a professor.

== Early life and education ==
Dhananjaya Chandrachud was born in the Chandrachud family on 11 November 1959. His father Yeshwant Vishnu Chandrachud, is the longest serving chief justice of India and his mother, Prabha, was a classical musician who sang for All India Radio.

After attending the Cathedral and John Connon School, Mumbai, and St. Columba's School, Delhi, he graduated with honours in economics and mathematics from St. Stephen's College, Delhi in 1979. He then obtained a Bachelor of Laws degree from the Faculty of Law at the University of Delhi in 1982, followed by a Master of Laws degree from Harvard Law School in 1983. He was awarded an Inlaks Scholarship, offered to Indian citizens pursuing graduate education abroad, and received the Joseph H. Beale Prize at Harvard. He later earned Doctor of Juridical Science (SJD) from Harvard Law School in 1986. His doctoral dissertation was on affirmative action where he considered the law in a comparative framework.

He has a notable interest in cricket. During his tenure, he presided over cases related to the Board of Control for Cricket in India, reflecting his engagement with cricket administration matters. His nickname "Danny" was given by a teacher during his school days in Mumbai.

== Career ==
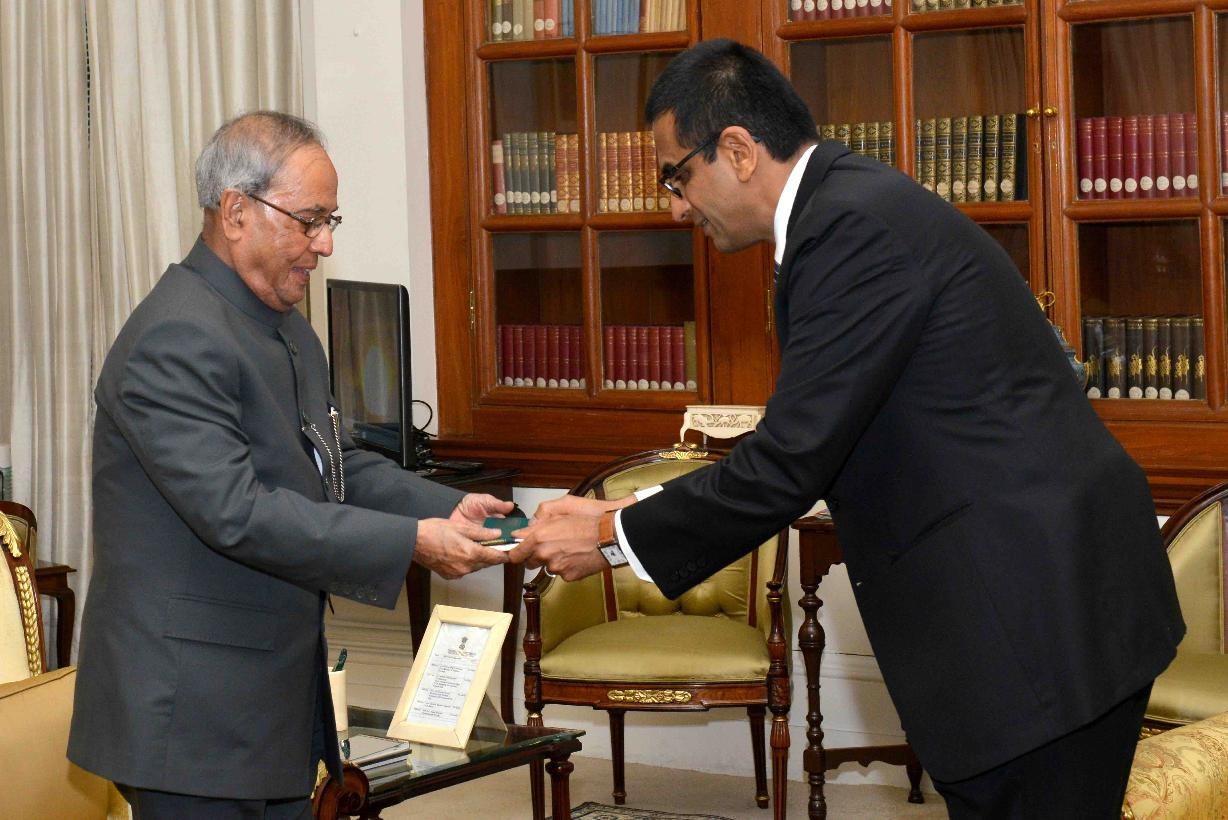
The president of India, Shri Pranab Mukherjee (left) meeting with Justice Chandrachud, Chief Justice of Allahabad High Court, at Rashtrapati Bhavan

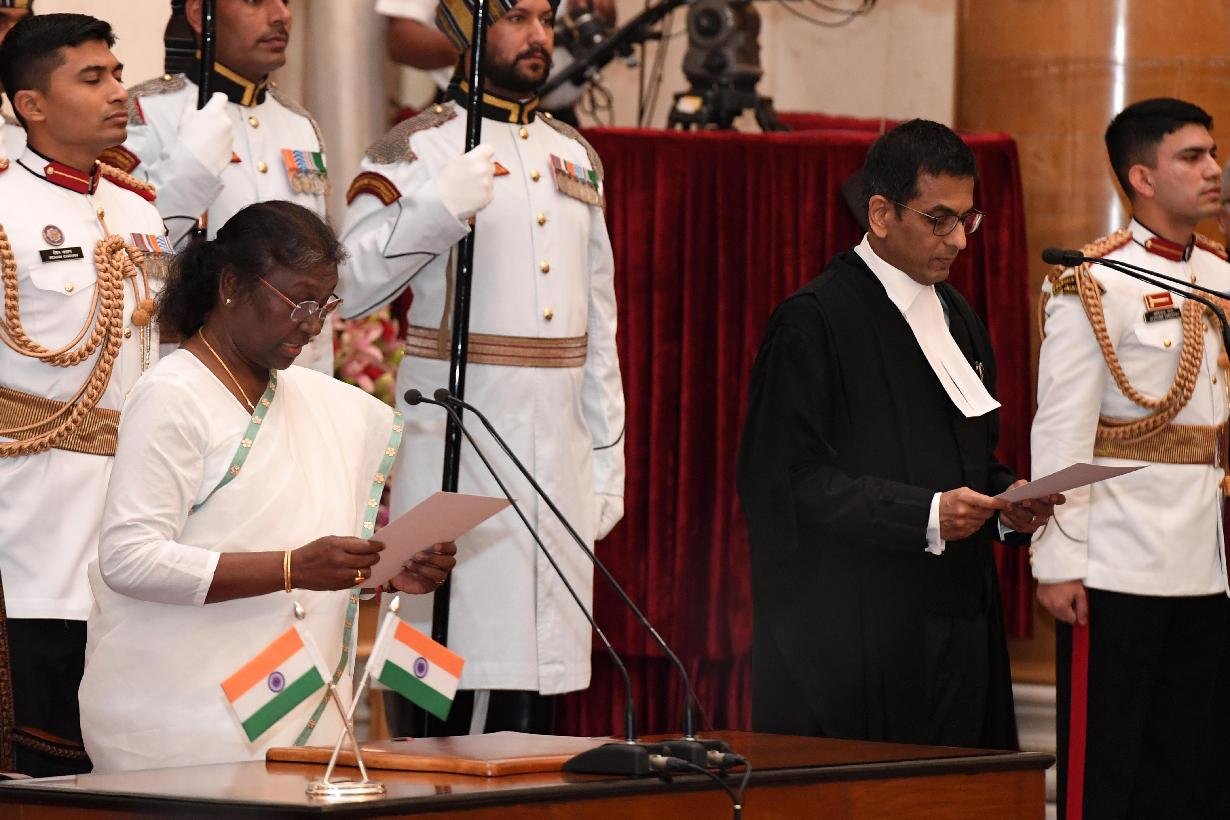
The president of India, Smt. Droupadi Murmu administered the oath of office to Justice Dhananjaya Yashwant Chandrachud as the chief justice of the Supreme Court of India

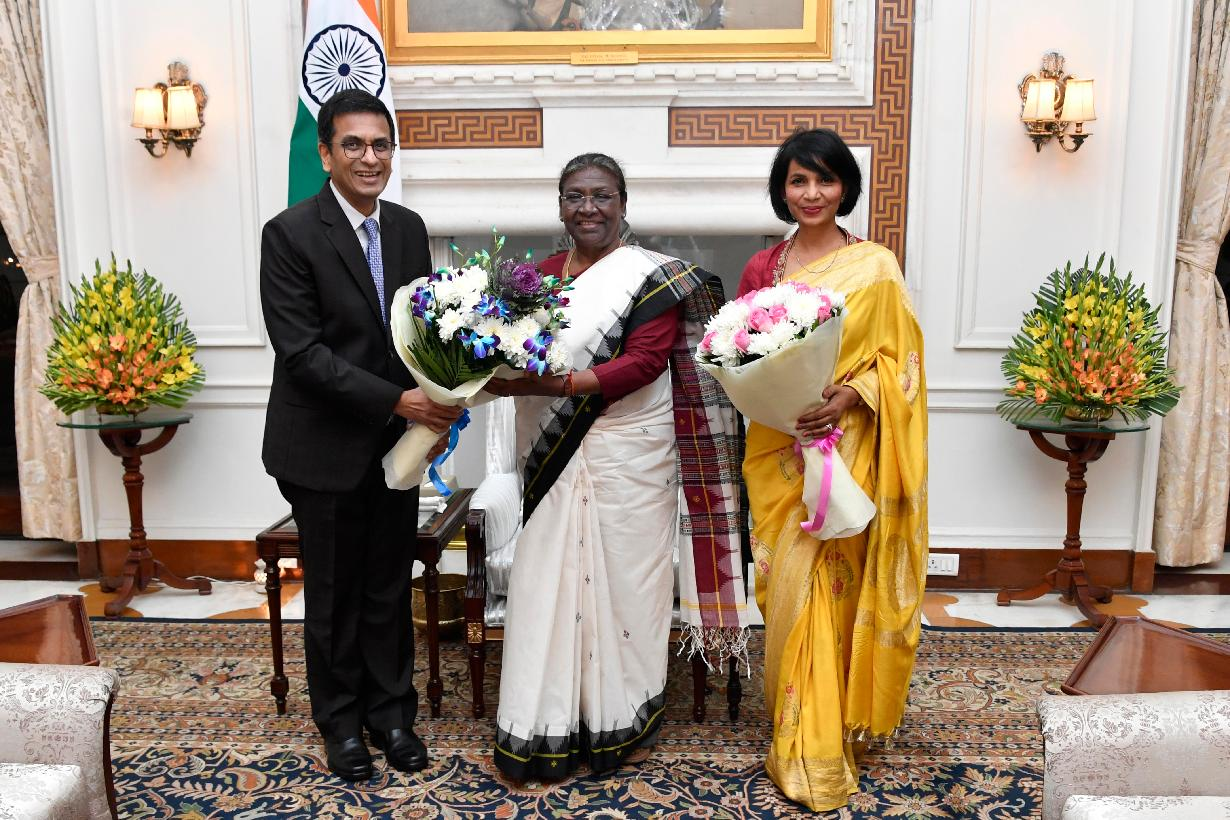
The chief justice of India, Justice D.Y. Chandrachud along with his wife Smt. Kalpana Das calling on the president of India, Smt. Droupadi Murmu, at Rashtrapati Bhavan

Chandrachud studied law at Delhi University in 1982 at a time when few jobs were available to young law graduates. He worked for a while, as a junior advocate assisting lawyers and judges, including drafting some briefs for Fali Nariman. After graduating from Harvard, Chandrachud first worked at the American law firm, Sullivan & Cromwell. He described this experience as "sheer fluke" due to the strong pecking order that existed at that time, and a strong bias against hiring Indians and men from developing countries. Upon returning to India, he practised law at the Supreme Court of India and the Bombay High Court. He was designated a Senior Advocate by the Bombay High Court in June 1998. That year, he was appointed an Additional Solicitor General of India, a role he held until his appointment as a Judge.

He became a judge at the Bombay High Court on 29 March 2000 and served there as a judge until his appointment as Chief Justice of the Allahabad High Court. During this time, he was also Director of the Maharashtra Judicial Academy. He was chief justice of the Allahabad High Court from 31 October 2013 until his appointment to the Supreme Court of India on 13 May 2016. Since 24 April 2021 he has been a part of the Collegium of the Supreme Court of India, which is a body composed of the five senior-most judges of the Supreme Court of India responsible for the appointment of judges to the Supreme Court of India and all the High Courts. On 17 October 2022, he was nominated the chief justice of India designate and after the retirement of the then chief justice, Uday Umesh Lalit, he was sworn in as the 50th chief justice of India on 9 November 2022.

Apart from his judicial service, Justice Chandrachud was also a visiting professor of comparative constitutional law at the University of Mumbai and University of Oklahoma College of Law in the United States. He has lectured at the Australian National University, Deakin University, Melbourne Law School, Harvard Law School, Yale Law School, the William S. Richardson School of Law at the University of Hawai‘i and the University of Witwatersrand, South Africa.

On 5 December 2023, Senior Advocate Dushyant Dave wrote an open letter to Chandrachud stating that he was violating listing rules by moving politically sensitive cases to particular benches. On 7 December, a report published by Article 14 alleged that there have been irregularities in allocating politically sensitive cases to bench led by Justice Bela Trivedi. Advocate Prashant Bhushan argued that Chandrachud, instead of Trivedi, should have led the bench for the case related to the application of the Unlawful Activities (Prevention) Act against journalists and lawyers in relation to their reporting on the 2021 Tripura riots. In response, Chandrachud said on 15 December that Trivedi was given cases because Judge A. S. Bopanna was ill, stating: "It is very easy to fling allegations and letters".

== Notable judgements ==
During his Supreme Court service, he had been on the highest number of constitutional benches (five judges or more) constituted to hear matters on constitutional questions. During his tenure at the Supreme Court, he had delivered judgements on Indian constitutional law, comparative constitutional law, human rights, gender justice, public interest litigations, commercial law and criminal law.

=== Right to Privacy ===
Among his notable judgements is his lead opinion in the Justice K. S. Puttaswamy (Retd.) and Anr. vs Union Of India And Ors. case as part of a unanimous nine-judge bench decision of the Indian Supreme Court, which affirmed that the right to privacy is a constitutionally guaranteed right. Chandrachud grounded the right to privacy in dignity, liberty, autonomy, bodily and mental integrity, self-determination and across a spectrum of protected rights. Writing for himself and three other judges, he stated:

Dignity cannot exist without privacy. Both reside within the inalienable values of life, liberty and freedom which the Constitution has recognized. Privacy is the ultimate expression of the sanctity of the individual. It is a constitutional value which straddles across the spectrum of fundamental rights and protects for the individual a zone of choice and self-determination.

The judgement is also noteworthy for his observations on sexual autonomy and privacy. In 2013, a two judge bench of the Supreme Court of India in the Suresh Kumar Koushal v. Naz Foundation case upheld Section 377 of the Indian Penal Code which criminalised homosexuality. Chandrachud referred to the decision as striking "a discordant note which directly bears upon the evolution of the constitutional jurisprudence on the right to privacy." He observed that the decision was wrong as "the purpose of elevating certain rights to the stature of guaranteed fundamental rights is to insulate their exercise from the disdain of majorities, whether legislative or popular." He concluded by disagreeing "with the manner in which Koushal has dealt with the privacy – dignity-based claims of LGBT persons" and held that:

The test of popular acceptance does not furnish a valid basis to disregard rights which are conferred with the sanctity of constitutional protection. Discrete and insular minorities face grave dangers of discrimination for the simple reason that their views, beliefs or way of life does not accord with the 'mainstream'. Yet in a democratic constitution founded on the rule of law, their rights are as sacred as those conferred on other citizens to protect their freedoms and liberties. Sexual orientation is an essential attribute of privacy. Discrimination against an individual on the basis of sexual orientation is deeply offensive to the dignity and self-worth of the individual.

The above observations played a role in the judgement of the Supreme Court declaring Section 377 of the Indian Penal Code unconstitutional.

He is also known for expressly overruling the ADM Jabalpur v. Shivkant Shukla (habeas corpus) case in which the lead opinion was written by his father, the former chief justice of India Y. V. Chandrachud.

=== Free speech ===
Terming dissent as "the safety valve of democracy", he has authored judgements upholding the right to the freedom of speech in numerous cases. In Indibility Creative Pvt Ltd v State of West Bengal, he authored a judgement which imposed a fine on the State of West Bengal and granted remedial compensation for disallowing the screening of the political satire Bhobishyoter Bhoot through extra-constitutional measures. The Court had, by an interim order, directed that there must be no bar on the screening of the movie. In the final judgement, Chandrachud held that even if there was any apprehension of public discontent, police protection must be provided instead of prohibiting the display of the movie. The judgement is noteworthy for its recognition of the positive duty on the State to protect the freedom of speech and expression. He held that:

Free speech cannot be gagged for fear of the mob…Political freedoms impose a restraining influence on the state by carving out an area in which the state shall not interfere. Hence, these freedoms are perceived to impose obligations of restraint on the state. But, apart from imposing 'negative' restraints on the state these freedoms impose a positive mandate as well. In its capacity as a public authority enforcing the rule of law, the state must ensure that conditions in which these freedoms flourish are maintained. In the space reserved for the free exercise of speech and expression, the state cannot look askance when organised interests threaten the existence of freedom. The state is duty bound to ensure the prevalence of conditions in which of those freedoms can be exercised. The instruments of the state must be utilised to effectuate the exercise of freedom.

The judgement was reported for preventing the censorship of free speech and limiting its exceptions strictly to the grounds mentioned in Article 19(2) of the Constitution. In another occasion, he has ruled against freedom of expression in the UPSC Jihad case, "Your client is doing a disservice to the nation and is not accepting India is a melting point of diverse cultures. Your client needs to exercise his freedom with caution".

In the Romila Thapar & Ors. v. Union of India & Ors case, Chandrachud dissented with the majority which refused to constitute a Special Investigation Team to probe the case concerning the arrest of five activists in connection with the 2018 Bhima Koregaon violence and held that in light of the particular circumstances of the case, the constitution of a Special Investigation Team was necessary to ensure a fair and impartial investigation.

In the Chief Election Commissioner of India v. M.R. Vijayabhaskar case, Chandrachud upheld the freedom of speech and expression of the media in reporting court proceedings. In this case, the Election Commission of India sought to restrain the media from reporting the oral observations of judges. The plea came in the context of media reports on the observations of judges of the Madras High Court stating that the Election Commission was responsible for the second wave of the COVID-19 pandemic in the country for allowing political parties to hold massive rallies without adhering to the COVID-19 protocols. Dismissing the plea, the Supreme Court held that the plea by the Election Commission "strikes at the two fundamental principles guaranteed under the Constitution – open court proceedings; and the fundamental right to freedom of speech and expression." The Court also recognised that reporting of judicial proceedings on social media is an extension of freedom of speech and expression that the media possesses.

In the suo motu writ petition dealing with the management of the COVID-19 pandemic, Chandrachud criticised certain State Governments for clamping down on free speech of citizens when they sought help for resources online. During the second wave of the COVID-19 pandemic, many Indians resorted to social media websites to source medical aid - procure oxygen, essential drugs or locate a hospital bed. State Governments in a bid to control the information on the abysmal state of healthcare system in their territories started registering police complaints against persons for posting pleas of help by stating that these were fake and were a bid to create panic and diminish the national image. Coming down harshly against such tactics in open court, Chandrachud remarked that there could be no clampdown on free flow of information, especially during a humanitarian crisis. The Supreme Court's order directed all Director Generals of Police to note that any such direct or indirect threats of prosecution or arrest against persons who air their grievances will amount to a contempt of court and invite penal action.

=== Personal liberty ===
Chandrachud authored the judgement which granted bail to Arnab Goswami, the editor-in-chief of Republic TV, who had been arrested by the Mumbai Police in connection with the suicide of an individual and his mother, who claimed Goswami had not paid him money owed for certain contract work. In his judgement, Chandrachud noted that the High Court of Bombay had failed to prima facie evaluate whether a case of abetment of suicide was made against Goswami. Finding that prima facie no such offence was made out from the facts of the matter, the Supreme Court held that he would be entitled to bail. In an important section on "Human liberty and the role of Court", Chandrachud noted that it was important to ensure that criminal law did not become a tool for selective harassment of citizens. Underscoring the importance of bail, the Court held: "More than four decades ago, in a celebrated judgment in State of Rajasthan, Jaipur vs Balchand, Justice Krishna Iyer pithily reminded us that the basic rule of our criminal justice system is "bail, not jail'.

The High Courts and Courts in the district judiciary of India must enforce this principle in practice, and not forego that duty, leaving this Court to intervene at all times. We must in particular also emphasise the role of the district judiciary, which provides the first point of interface to the citizen. Our district judiciary is wrongly referred to as the 'subordinate judiciary'. It may be subordinate in hierarchy, but it is not subordinate in terms of its importance in the lives of citizens or in terms of the duty to render justice to them. High Courts get burdened when courts of first instance decline to grant anticipatory bail or bail in deserving cases. This continues in the Supreme Court as well, when High Courts do not grant bail or anticipatory bail in cases falling within the parameters of the law. The consequence for those who suffer incarceration are serious. Common citizens without the means or resources to move the High Courts or this Court languish as undertrials. Courts must be alive to the situation as it prevails on the ground – in the jails and police stations where human dignity has no protector. As judges, we would do well to remind ourselves that it is through the instrumentality of bail that our criminal justice system's primordial interest in preserving the presumption of innocence finds its most eloquent expression. The remedy of bail is the ―solemn expression of the humaneness of the justice system. Tasked as we are with the primary responsibility of preserving the liberty of all citizens, we cannot countenance an approach that has the consequence of applying this basic rule in an inverted form. We have given expression to our anguish in a case where a citizen has approached this court. We have done so in order to reiterate principles which must govern countless other faces whose voices should not go unheard."

Further, the judgement, using publicly available data on the National Judicial Data Grid, also highlighted the number of pending bail applications throughout the country and directed the High Courts and lower Courts to use all tools at their disposal, including technology, to ensure that these applications are disposed off swiftly.

In another case of Rahna Jalal v. State of Kerala, Chandrachud dealt with the question of whether anticipatory bail can be granted to a person (Muslim man) accused of the offence of pronouncement of triple talaq to his wife, punishable under Section 4 of the Muslim Women (Protection of Rights on Marriage) Act 2019. Section 7(c) of the said Act provides that notwithstanding anything contained in the Code of Criminal Procedure 1973, no person accused of this offence would be granted bail, unless the Magistrate has heard the Muslim woman and is satisfied that there are reasonable grounds for granting bail to the accused. The State of Kerala argued that the non-obstante clause in Section 7(c) barred the courts from exercising their powers under Section 438 of the Code of Criminal Procedure to grant anticipatory bail.

Rejecting this argument, Chandrachud observed that the right to personal liberty and the grant of bail is a recognition of presumption of innocence where a trial is yet to take place. Given the value of personal liberty, in the absence of an express bar by the Legislature making the provisions of Section 438 inapplicable, no such bar can be presumed. It was further reiterated that a statutory exclusion of the right to access remedies for bail is to be construed strictly.

=== Gender justice ===
==== Sabarimala ====
Chandrachud has authored several judgements on gender justice that call for a 'change in mindsets' as well as affirm the equal entitlements of women under the Constitution. In the Indian Young Lawyers Association v. State of Kerala case, he authored a concurring judgement holding that the practice of prohibiting women of menstruating age from entering the Sabarimala temple was discriminatory and violated the fundamental rights of women. In his judgement, he highlighted that "the individual right to the freedom of religion was not intended to prevail over but was subject to the overriding constitutional postulates of equality, liberty and personal freedoms recognised in the other provisions of Part III." He held that:

The Court must lean against granting constitutional protection to a claim which derogates from the dignity of women as equal holders of rights and protections… Does the Constitution permit this as basis to exclude women from worship? Does the fact that a woman has a physiological feature – of being in a menstruating age – entitle anybody or a group to subject her to exclusion from religious worship? The physiological features of a woman have no significance to her equal entitlements under the Constitution… To exclude women is derogatory to an equal citizenship.

The judgement was acknowledged for recognising that denying entry into temples to women on the basis of physiology amounted to a constitutionally prohibited practice of untouchability under Article 17. He stated that "the social exclusion of women, based on menstrual status, is a form of untouchability, which is contrary to constitutional values. Notions of 'purity' and 'pollution', which stigmatise individuals, have no place in a constitutional order."

Following protests against the judgement in the State of Kerala, a five-judge bench of the Indian Supreme Court, while hearing a review petition against the judgement in November 2019, decided to refer the matter to a larger bench. Chandrachud and Nariman (who were both part of the original bench that passed the majority judgement) dissented and held that the parameters for the exercise of the review jurisdiction of the Court had not been met.

==== Adultery ====
In the Joseph Shine v Union of India case he authored a concurring judgement declaring the provision of the Indian Penal Code which concerned the adultery law in India unconstitutional. Emphasising the constitutional commitment to equality and dignity, he held that:

The creation of a just, egalitarian society is a process. It often involves the questioning and obliteration of parochial social mores which are antithetical to constitutional morality…The ability to make choices within marriage and on every aspect concerning it is a facet of human liberty and dignity which the Constitution protects… Implicit in seeking to privilege the fidelity of women in a marriage, is the assumption that a woman contracts away her sexual agency when entering a marriage. That a woman, by marriage, consents in advance to sexual relations with her husband or to refrain from sexual relations outside marriage without the permission of her husband is offensive to liberty and dignity. Such a notion has no place in the constitutional order. Sexual autonomy constitutes an inviolable core of the dignity of every individual.

His concurring opinion was noticed for its emphasis on the sexual autonomy of women even within the bounds of a marital relationship. He held that:

…. in adjudicating on the rights of women, the Court is not taking on a paternalistic role and "granting" rights. The Court is merely interpreting the text of the Constitution to re-state what is already set in ink — women are equal citizens of this nation, entitled to the protections of the Constitution. Any legislation which results in the denial of these Constitutional guarantees to women, cannot pass the test of Constitutionality.

It is reported that the above observations have a significant bearing on the law employed for the restitution of conjugal rights as well as the exception carved out in law from criminalising marital rape. This case was the second case where Chandrachud overruled a decision of his father, former Chief Justice of India Y. V. Chandrachud.

==== Armed forces ====
Army

In 2020, he authored two decisions in the realm of gender justice and the armed forces of the country. In the Secretary, Ministry of Defence v Babita Puniya case he directed the government to consider all woman officers in the Army appointed on Short Service Commissions for the grant of Permanent Commissions on an equal basis with their male counterparts. The Union Government had contended that "women are not employed on duties which are hazardous in nature unlike their male counterparts in the same Arm/Service." It was also contended that the "inherent physiological differences between men and women preclude equal physical performances resulting in lower physical standards."

In a section titled 'Stereotypes and women in the Armed Forces', he emphasised on the need for a change in mindsets and came down heavily on the submissions of the Union Government and held that:

The submissions advanced…are based on sex stereotypes premised on assumptions about socially ascribed roles of gender which discriminate against women. Underlying the statement that it is a "greater challenge" for women officers to meet the hazards of service "owing to their prolonged absence during pregnancy, motherhood and domestic obligations towards their children and families" is a strong stereotype which assumes that domestic obligations rest solely on women. Reliance on the "inherent physiological differences between men and women" rests in a deeply entrenched stereotypical and constitutionally flawed notion that women are the "weaker" sex and may not undertake tasks that are "too arduous" for them. Arguments founded on the physical strengths and weaknesses of men and women and on assumptions about women in the social context of marriage and family do not constitute a constitutionally valid basis for denying equal opportunity to women officers…If society holds strong beliefs about gender roles – that men are socially dominant, physically powerful and the breadwinners of the family and that women are weak and physically submissive, and primarily caretakers confined to a domestic atmosphere – it is unlikely that there would be a change in mindsets.

The judgement was reported internationally as well as in national media as a "landmark verdict ending gender bias" which is "against deeply embedded patriarchal mindsets and strong institutional biases." At the International Judicial Conference hosted by India on the 'Judiciary and the Changing World', which saw the participation of Chief Justices and judges from over 23 countries, the President of India welcomed the judgement and commended it for its "progressive social transformation"

In 2021, the women who received the benefit of the Babita Puniya ruling contended that the Union Government applied a facially neural standard for their belated assessment for Permanent Commission, on medical standards that were applicable to men when they were 25–30 years old and by discounting their subsequent achievements. In granting relief to these women, he elaborated on the doctrine of systemic discrimination and indirect discrimination as a relevant framework for assessing claims of discrimination and structuring remedies. He noted:

"Indirect discrimination is caused by facially neutral criteria by not taking into consideration the underlying effects of a provision, practice or a criterion….. Exclusive reliance on tools of direct or indirect discrimination may also not effectively account for patterns arising out of multiple axles of discrimination. Therefore, a systemic view of discrimination, in perceiving discriminatory disadvantage as a continuum, would account for not just unjust action but also inaction. Structures, in the form of organisations or otherwise, would be probed for the systems or cultures they produce that influence day-to-day interaction and decision making"

The judgement was hailed internationally, nationally and by scholars for broadening the horizons of Indian jurisprudence on Article 14 and 15(1) of the Indian Constitution.

Navy

A short while after the Babita Puniya ruling, he authored the judgement in the Union of India v Ld. Cdr. Annie Nagaraja case wherein the Court directed a similar relief to be granted to women sailors in the Indian Navy. The Court noted the submission of the Union Government that "certain avenues such as sea-sailing duties are ill-suited for women officers as there is no return to the base" and that "Navy ships of today are not structured nor have the infrastructure to accommodate women sailors alongside men sailors" and rejected these submissions as "illusory and without any foundation". The judgement received similar international attention and was widely reported upon in national media.

==== Sexual harassment at the workplace ====
Recently, he authored a judgement which affirmed that sexual harassment at the workplace violates the fundamental rights of women guaranteed under the Indian Constitution. The verdict was based on a complaint made by a senior officer of the Punjab and Sind Bank that she was transferred out from Indore to Jabalpur because she had complained about irregularities and corruption. The woman, a chief manager and Scale IV officer, said she was also allegedly sexually harassed by her senior officer. He held that:

Sexual harassment at the workplace is an affront to the fundamental rights of a woman to equality under Articles 14 and 15 and her right to live with dignity under Article 21 of the Constitution as well as her right to practice any profession or to carry on any occupation, trade or business… There can be no manner of doubt that the respondent (woman officer) has been victimised. This is symptomatic of a carrot and sticks policy adopted to suborn the dignity of a woman who is aggrieved by unfair treatment at her workplace. The law cannot countenance this. The order of transfer was an act of unfair treatment and is vitiated by malafides.

He directed the bank to send the woman employee back to the Indore branch and held that the bank may pass any other order only after she has completed a tenure of one year at the Indore branch.

==== Intersectional violence ====
On 27 April 2021, he authored a judgement which considered caste and the disability of the woman as a relevant factor in sentencing of the accused for the offence of rape. The judgement further held that a true reading of the SC & ST Act, 1989 shows that it will be attracted to a criminal offence as long as caste identity is one of the grounds for the occurrence of the offence. This was an important intervention since certain earlier Supreme Court cases had held that a SC & ST Act charge would only be attracted if the crime was committed solely on the ground that the victim belonged to the Scheduled Caste or Scheduled Tribe community.

Chandrachud undertook an intersectional analysis to examine how gender violence can be a result of combination of various oppressions and observed that, "[w]hen the identity of a woman intersects with, inter alia, her caste, class, religion, disability and sexual orientation, she may face violence and discrimination due to two or more grounds. Trans women may face violence on account of their heterodox gender identity. In such a situation, it becomes imperative to use an intersectional lens to evaluate how multiple sources of oppression operate cumulatively to produce a specific experience of subordination for a blind Scheduled Caste woman."

He further criticised single axis legislations which focus on oppression on account of a singular source, be it caste, gender or disability, noting that they make invisible the experiences of minorities within these broader groups who suffer on account of multiple oppressions. Further, he also noted that such legislations impose an unrealistic evidentiary burden on individuals who are at the intersection of various marginalised identities since "evidence of discrete discrimination or violence on a specific ground may be absent or difficult to prove". He noted that the 2015 amendment to the SC & ST Act, which changed the evidentiary requirement of proving that the crime was committed on the basis of the caste identity to a standard where knowledge of the caste identity was sufficient to sustain a conviction, was a positive development and enabled an intersectional analysis of caste violence.

Another significant aspect of this judgement was the holding of the Court that testimony of a disabled witness cannot be considered weaker or inferior to their able-bodied counterparts. Chandrachud also issued certain guidelines to make the criminal justice system more disabled-friendly.

=== Environment ===
One of Chandrachud's significant opinions in the sphere of environmental law is his judgement in the Hanuman Laxman Aroskar vs Union of India case. A challenge was brought before the Supreme Court against the order of the National Green Tribunal upholding the grant of an Environmental Clearance to a proposed greenfield international airport at Mopa in Goa. A myriad of contentions were urged by the appellants questioning the grant of the clearance, which included the failure to make disclosures on forests and Ecologically Sensitive Zones as well as a faulty appraisal process and the use of erroneous sampling points. The Court observed the numerous deficiencies in the process leading to the grant of the clearance and directed that a rapid EIA be conducted afresh by the project proponent. The Court highlighted that compliance with the core governing notification is mandatory in the following terms:

The 2006 notification represents an independent code with the avowed objective of balancing the development agenda with the protection of the environment. An applicant cannot claim an EC, under the 2006 notification, based on substantial or proportionate compliance with the terms stipulated in the notification. The terms of the notification lay down strict standards that must be complied with by an applicant seeking an EC for a proposed project. The burden of establishing environmental compliance rests on a project proponent who intends to bring about a change in the existing state of the environment… There can be no gambles with the environment: a 'heads I win, tails you lose' approach is simply unacceptable; unacceptable if we are to preserve environmental governance under the rule of law.

The judgement has expounded on the concept of the 'environmental rule of law' as a groundwork for the protection of the environment. The judgement was also welcomed by the United Nations Environment Program. In a separate section titled the 'Environmental Rule of Law', the Court drew from vast literature on environmental law which included the UN Sustainable Development Goals and the work of Amartya Sen and Dhvani Mehta to draw a link between the protection of the environment and the right to life under Article 21 of the Indian Constitution. In the Bangalore Development Authority v Mr Sudhakar Hegde case, he authored a judgement directing the appellant to conduct a rapid EIA as a result of the numerous deficiencies in the process leading up to the grant of Environmental Clearance. The Court noted the "patent contradiction" in disclosing the existence of forest land to be diverted for the project connecting Tumkur Road to Hosur Road. In a section titled 'Courts and the Environment', he highlighted the importance of a broad-based approach to the protection of the environment in the following terms:

The protection of the environment is premised not only on the active role of courts, but also on robust institutional frameworks within which every stakeholder complies with its duty to ensure sustainable development. A framework of environmental governance committed to the rule of law requires a regime which has effective, accountable and transparent institutions. Equally important is responsive, inclusive, participatory and representative decision making. Environmental governance is founded on the rule of law and emerges from the values of our Constitution. Where the health of the environment is key to preserving the right to life as a constitutionally recognised value under Article 21 of the Constitution, proper structures for environmental decision making find expression in the guarantee against arbitrary action and the affirmative duty of fair treatment under Article 14 of the Constitution.

Chandrachud has also authored a judgement on the validity of grating ex post facto Environmental Clearances in the Alembic Pharmaceuticals Ltd v Rohit Prajapati case. The erstwhile Ministry of Environment and Forests had issued an administrative circular in 2002 envisaging the grant of ex post facto clearances to those industries that had failed to comply with the mandatory EIA notification of 1994. The ex post facto clearances granted to a group of drug and pharmaceutical companies located in Gujarat were challenged. Chandrachud set aside the administrative circular of 2002 and noted that the concept of ex post facto ECs derogates from the fundamental principles of the environmental rule of law. He noted that the grant of ex post facto ECs was contrary to both the precautionary principle as well as the principal of sustainable development. Chandrachud noted that all the industries in question had made significant infrastructural investments. In this backdrop, he imposed a fine of Rs 10 crores each for the purpose of restitution and restoration of the environment. He held:

Requirements such as conducting a public hearing, screening, scoping and appraisal are components of the decision-making process which ensure that the likely impacts of the industrial activity or the expansion of an existing industrial activity are considered in the decision-making calculus. Allowing for an ex post facto clearance would essentially condone the operation of industrial activities without the grant of an EC. In the absence of an EC, there would be no conditions that would safeguard the environment. Moreover, if the EC was to be ultimately refused, irreparable harm would have been caused to the environment. In either view of the matter, environment law cannot countenance the notion of an ex post facto clearance. This would be contrary to both the precautionary principle as well as the need for sustainable development.

In a recent judgement in the Himachal Pradesh Bus Stand Management and Development Authority v. The Central Empowered Committee case, Chandrachud directed the demolition of a Hotel-cum-Restaurant structure in the Bus Stand Complex in McLeod Ganj, Himachal Pradesh, which had been constructed in violation of permissions granted under the various environmental laws. The construction of the structure had been in dispute for nearly 14 years, before it was finally resolved through this judgement. Developing on the concept of environmental rule of law propounded by him in the Hanuman Laxman Aroskar v Union of India case, he discussed how actual implementation may suffer from lack of access to scientific data to ascertain concrete harm. However, he held:

"The environmental rule of law calls on us, as judges, to marshal the knowledge emerging from the record, limited though it may sometimes be, to respond in a stern and decisive fashion to violations of environmental law. We cannot be stupefied into inaction by not having access to complete details about the manner in which an environmental law violation has occurred or its full implications. Instead, the framework, acknowledging the imperfect world that we inhabit, provides a roadmap to deal with environmental law violations, an absence of clear evidence of consequences notwithstanding."

=== Labour ===
In the wake of the pandemic, Chandrachud judicially reviewed a decision of the State of Gujarat to suspend some provisions of overtime pay, work intervals, working hours and other labour protections by resorting to Section 5 of the Factories Act, 1948 by terming it an 'emergency therein'. In tightly interpreting the scope of Section 5, which envisaged suspension of protections only when the 'public emergency threatens the security of the state', Chandrachud warned against "rendering hard-won protections of the Factories Act, 1948 illusory and the constitutional promise of social and economic democracy into paper-tigers."

In addition to its contribution on labour jurisprudence and the interpretation of directive principles of state policy, the judgement was also hailed for critically examining executive actions, which were otherwise given a wide leeway during the COVID-19 pandemic.

=== Constitutional judgements on governance ===
==== Ordinances ====
Chandrachud was a part of the seven-judge bench in the Krishna Kumar Singh v. State of Bihar case, which concerned the re-promulgation of ordinances. The enduring rights theory, according to which the rights and liabilities accrued by virtue of an ordinance were said to have an enduring effect even after the expiration of the ordinance was held bad in law. Chandrachud writing for the majority held that the rights and liabilities accrued during the force of the ordinance would continue to exist even after the expiration of the ordinance only in public interest or on the basis of constitutional necessity and that 'irreversibility' and 'impracticability' are the yardsticks to determine what constitutes 'public interest'. He observed:

The Constitution bench equated an ordinance with a temporary act enacted by the competent legislature. This approach, with respect fails to notice the critical distinction between an enactment of a competent legislature and an ordinance. Acceptance of the doctrine of enduring rights in the context of an ordinance would lead to a situation where the exercise of power by the Governor would survive in terms of the creation of the rights and privileges…The legislature may not have had an opportunity to even discuss or debate the Ordinance…. The enduring rights theory attributes a degree of permanence to the power to promulgate ordinances in derogation of parliamentary control and supremacy.

He also observed that laying down ordinances before the Parliament is a mandatory constitutional obligation that cannot be bypassed. The judgement was recognised for expanding the grounds of judicial review of an ordinance and limiting the scope of the mala fide exercise of ordinance promulgation.

==== The National Capital Territory ====
Chandrachud was part of the constitution bench in the National Capital Territory v. Union of India case, in which the nature of power of the Lieutenant Governor of Delhi vis-à-vis the Government of Delhi was decided. The majority unanimously observed that the Chief Minister, not the Lieutenant Governor, is the executive head of the territory and that the Lieutenant Governor had no independent decision-making power, save and except as provided by the Constitution in exceptional situations. It was observed that he had to follow the aid and advice of the Council of Ministers, except when the matter was related to police, public order and land. It was also held that by virtue of Article 239AA(4) of the Indian Constitution, the Lieutenant Governor could, in the case of any disagreement between the Delhi Government and the Lieutenant Governor, refer 'exceptional' matters to the President seeking his opinion. In such cases, the decision of the President would be final. Chandrachud's concurring opinion which was commented upon for its clarity and nuance, held that an 'exceptional matter' is one in which "the Government of the NCT is likely to impede or prejudice the exercise of the executive power of the Union Government". Chandrachud emphasised on the obligation of the Lieutenant Governor to abide by the aid and advice of the Delhi Government and observed that the interpretation that aids the basic features of representative governance and the cabinet form of government should be adopted. He held:

…in defining the ambit of the constitutional powers entrusted to the Council of Ministers for the NCT and their relationship with Lieutenant Governor as a delegate of the President, the Court cannot be unmindful of the constitutional importance which has to be assigned to representative government. Representative government is a hallmark of a Constitution which is wedded to democracy for it is through a democratic form of governance that the aspirations of those who elect their representatives are met.

==== Floor test for elections ====
Chandrachud authored a judgement with far reaching consequences in the political sphere in the Shivraj Singh Chouhan v. Speaker, Madhya Pradesh Legislative Assembly case. Chandrachud held that the Governor's exercise of power to convene the legislative assembly for a floor test during an ongoing session of the assembly was "legitimate to the purpose of ensuring that the norm of collective responsibility is duly preserved". He accepted the submission that the Governor commands the power to order a floor test if the Governor has – based on "objective material" – reasons to believe that the government has lost its majority. Significantly, he noted that the power of the Governor is not unbridled in the following terms:

Where the exercise of the discretion by the Governor to call a floor test is challenged before the court, it is not immune from judicial review. The court is entitled to determine whether in calling for the floor test, the Governor did so on the basis of objective material and reasons which were relevant and germane to the exercise of the power. The exercise of such a power is not intended to destabilise or displace a democratically elected government accountable to the legislative assembly and collectively responsible to it.

In a first of its kind observation, Chandrachud also noted the state of politics in the country and called for changes to strengthen the nature of the Indian democratic system in the following terms:

The spectacle of rival political parties whisking away their political flock to safe destinations does little credit to the state our democratic politics. It is an unfortunate reflection of the confidence which political parties hold in their own constituents and a reflection of what happens in the real world of the politics to lure away persons from rival camps… It is best that courts maintain an arm's length from the sordid tales of political life. In defining constitutional principle, however, this Court must be conscious of the position on the ground as admitted by Counsel of both sides and an effort has to be made to the extent possible to ensure that democratic values prevail.

==== Doctrine of legitimate expectations ====
Chandrachud authored a judgement in the State of Jharkhand v. Brahmputra Metallics Limited case, where at issue was a notification issued by the State of Jharkhand under which the electricity rebate under the Industrial Policy of 2012 was granted only from 2015 onwards. While the High Court of Jharkhand had struck down the notification based on the doctrine of promissory estoppel, Supreme Court's judgement, through an analysis of English and Indian law, clarified that its basis would instead be the doctrine of legitimate expectation. The Court held that the doctrine of legitimate expectations was one of the ways in which the guarantee of non-arbitrariness enshrined under Article 14 of the Constitution of India finds concrete expression. In striking down the notification, Chandrachud came down harshly on the lethargic attitude of the State of Jharkhand in belatedly issuing the notification and held:

"It is one thing for the State to assert that the writ petitioner had no vested right but quite another for the State to assert that it is not duty bound to disclose its reasons for not giving effect to the exemption notification within the period that was envisaged in the Industrial Policy 2012. Both the accountability of the State and the solemn obligation which it undertook in terms of the policy document militate against accepting such a notion of state power. The state must discard the colonial notion that it is a sovereign handing out doles at its will. Its policies give rise to legitimate expectations that the state will act according to what it puts forth in the public realm. In all its actions, the State is bound to act fairly, in a transparent manner. This is an elementary requirement of the guarantee against arbitrary state action which Article 14 of the Constitution adopts. A deprivation of the entitlement of private citizens and private business must be proportional to a requirement grounded in public interest."

==== COVID- 19: In Re: Distribution of essential supplies and services during pandemic ====
During the second wave of the COVID-19 pandemic in India in April 2021, a bench of the Supreme Court of India headed by then–Chief Justice SA Bobde, Justice LN Rao and Justice S Ravindra Bhat, took suo motu cognisance of the situation in the country to deal with issues pertaining to the availability of oxygen supply, essential drugs and modalities for vaccination. After the retirement of Chief Justice Bobde on 23 April 2021, the bench composition was altered with Chandrachud replacing Chief Justice Bobde.

The Supreme Court bench led by Chandrachud highlighted that the exercise of its suo motu jurisdiction was to discharge its constitutional duty as protector of the fundamental rights during a pandemic, along with the High Courts and not in usurpation of their jurisdiction. Additionally, the bench adopted a bounded-deliberative approach to facilitate dialogue between the Union Government, various State Governments and the relevant stakeholders in order to assess the policy of the Union Government on the touchstone of Article 14 (right to equality) and Article 21 (right to life) of the Constitution of India. Through a series of directions, the Supreme Court directed the Union Government to formulate a national hospital admission policy to ensure no person is denied medical aid on grounds of non-residency in a particular State and raised concerns regarding the augmentation of medical oxygen available and steps taken by the Government. Pertinently, the Supreme Court had made critical observations on the Liberalised Vaccination Policy of the Government of India and noted that the vaccination policy of free vaccination for persons above the age of 45 and paid vaccination for persons between 18 and 44 years was prima facie arbitrary and irrational. The court also sought justification for the decentralised procurement leaving the State Governments to approach global vaccine producers, instead of the Union of India acting collectively; concerns regarding augmentation of vaccine production, issues relating to the modality of vaccination through the use of a digital platform, CoWIN given the digital divide in urban and rural India. In light of these issues, the Union Government was directed to provide justifications or revise its policy.

A week after the Supreme court order, the Narendra Modi led Government revised its vaccination policy, centralising its procurement and providing free vaccination to all adults, including between ages 18–44 years. It is widely believed that the change in the vaccination policy was a result of the continuous engagement of the Supreme Court with the Government and its scathing remarks against the Government's vaccination policy.

=== Affirmative action ===
Chandrachud has authored numerous judgements on affirmative action in India. Foremost amongst these is his judgement in the B.K. Pavitra II v. Union of India case, where he upheld the constitutional validity of the Karnataka Extension of Consequential Seniority to Government Servants Promoted on the Basis of Reservation (to the Posts in the Civil Services of the State) Act 2018. The Act concerned the grant of consequential seniority to candidates appointed on the basis of reservation. The judgement was recognised for undertaking a critical and nuanced analysis that weighs towards an inclusive definition of 'efficiency' and consequently 'merit', - one that is consistent with the principle of substantive equality, as opposed to formal equality. Drawing on the work of Amartya Sen, he held that:

A meritocratic system is one that rewards actions that result in the outcomes that we as a society value…Thus, the providing of reservations for SCs and the STs is not at odds with the principle of meritocracy. "Merit" must not be limited to narrow and inflexible criteria such as one's rank in a standardised exam, but rather must flow from the actions a society seeks to reward, including the promotion of equality in society and diversity in public administration.

In the chairman and managing director, Food Corporation of India v Jagdish Balaram Bahira case, Chandrachud affirmed the principle that a person who receives the benefit of public employment on the basis of a false caste certificate is not entitled to protection in exercise of the equitable power conferred upon Courts. Chandrachud held that the "withdrawal of civil benefits flowed as a logical result of the validation of a claim to belong to a group or category for whom the reservation is intended" and that "the selection of ineligible persons is a manifestation of a systematic failure and has deleterious effects on good governance." Observing that the governing state legislation explicitly specified the consequences of relying upon a false caste certificate, the Court held that recourse to the inherent powers of the Supreme Court under Article 142 would not be justified. In the same vein, Chandrachud observed that where there was a statutory bar to conferring benefits on the basis of a false certificate, administrative circulars and government resolutions, being subservient to legislative mandate, would not be permitted to cure the defect of a false caste certificate.

==== Disability rights ====
In the Vikash Kumar v. Union Public Service Commission case, Chandrachud elaborated on the concept of reasonable accommodation under the Rights of Persons with Disabilities Act, 2016. In the case, an appellant, who was a civil servant aspirant, suffered from writer's cramp. His application for writing the exam with the assistance of a scribe was rejected by the UPSC as he did not have a benchmark disability under the Act. Chandrachud while allowing the petition held that the concept of reasonable accommodation is at the heart of the Act. It is a positive obligation of the State and private parties to provide additional support to persons with disabilities to ensure their participation in the society. He further held that disability is a social construct which has to be remedied by ensuring conditions that facilitate development of the disabled and must meet the needs of every individual disabled person. Chandrachud also stressed on the intersectional nature of disability based discrimination. In doing so, he held that a previous decision of the Supreme Court in the V. Surendra Mohan v. Tamil Nadu case, where the Court refused to allow a visually disabled person from becoming a judicial officer, did not incorporate the principle of reasonable accommodation as it was rendered under the old Persons with Disabilities (Equal Opportunities, Protection of Rights and Full Participation) Act 1995 and would no longer be a binding precedent.

=== Commercial law ===
Chandrachud has also authored opinions in several commercial disputes and emphasised the principles of certainty and objectivity in the area of commercial law. He rejected the challenge by Adani Gas Limited to the grant of authorisation for the construction and operation of consumer gas distribution networks in the state of Tamil Nadu. The dispute concerned the alleged addition of certain bidding criteria after the last date for bidding. In upholding the decisions taken by the Petroleum and Natural Gas Regulatory Board, Chandrachud noted that the additional criteria had only been proposed by the regulator as an agenda item, but was never subsequently adopted. He also observed that when a tender is challenged by a bidder, the dispute remains solely between the bidder and the regulator, and the regulator's treatment of other bids that have no bearing on the disputed bid cannot be used to allege a case of arbitrariness against the regulator's actions.

Chandrachud also authored a judgement governing the liquidation of Super Bazar. The once-iconic Co-Operative Society had fallen on hard times and Writers and Publishers had won the bid to revive Super Bazar under a court regulated recovery scheme. However, an audit by the Comptroller and Auditor General of India found several accounting irregularities in the management of Super Bazar by Writers and Publishers. Chandrachud's judgement held that it would be against the first principles of insolvency if a resolution applicant were to be refunded their investment after a failed revival effort. His opinion directed that Super Bazar's assets be handed over to the official liquidator and disposed of in accordance with the statutory order of preferences.

==== Insurance law ====
Chandrachud has authored opinions regarding the interpretation of insurance contracts. In one such decision, a claim was filed by the wife of the deceased who while riding his motorcycle, experienced pain in the chest and shoulder, suffered a heart attack and fell from the motorcycle. Chandrachud discussed extensively the jurisprudence on insurance law in various jurisdictions, dealt with the interpretation of the expressions 'accident', 'bodily injury' and 'outward, violent and visible means'. He rejected the claim noting that there is no evidence to show that any bodily injuries were suffered due to the fall from the motorcycle or that it led to the assured suffering a heart attack.

In another decision, Chandrachud relied on the doctrine of uberrimae fidei and held that any suppression, untruth or inaccuracy in the statement in the proposal form by the insured is a breach of the duty of good faith and will render the policy voidable by the insurer. Chandrachud noted that the system of adequate disclosures helps to narrow down the gap of information asymmetries between the parties and helps the insurers to assess their risk appetite. He held:

Proposal forms are a significant part of the disclosure procedure and warrant accuracy of statements. Utmost care must be exercised in filling the proposal form. In a proposal form the applicant declares that she/he warrants truth. The contractual duty so imposed is such that any suppression, untruth or inaccuracy in the statement in the proposal form will be considered as a breach of the duty of good faith and will render the policy voidable by the insurer. The system of adequate disclosure helps buyers and sellers of insurance policies to meet at a common point and narrow down the gap of information asymmetries

In a judgement reported in national media, Chandrachud dealt with the question of whether a death caused due to malaria occasioned by a mosquito bite constituted a 'death due to accident' covered under the terms of an insurance policy. He rejected the contention that being bitten by a mosquito is an unforeseen eventuality and should be regarded as an accident. Chandrachud noted the distinction between the occurrence of a disease which may be considered as an accident and a disease which occurs in the natural course of events. He referred to the World Health Organization's World Malaria Report 2018 and noted that in a country severely afflicted with malaria, the mosquito bite was neither unexpected nor unforeseen and therefore, death caused by a mosquito bite would not be covered by the insurance policy.

==== Insolvency law ====
Chandrachud has recently authored key judgements in relation to the Insolvency and Bankruptcy Code, 2016. In the Phoenix Arc Private Limited v. Spade Financial Services Limited case, the issue before the Supreme Court was whether entities who may have been related parties of a corporate debtor at the time of acquiring of a financial debt, but are no longer related parties, can be excluded from the Committee of Creditors. In taking a purposive approach to the issue, Chandrachud looked at the objects of the Insolvency Code and highlighted the importance of checking on actions where the "related party financial creditor devises mechanism to remove its label of a 'related party' before the Corporate Debtor undergoes CIRP, so as to be able to enter the CoC and influence its decision making at the cost of other financial creditors."

Further, Chandrachud also held that "collusive transactions" between two parties would not give rise to "financial debt" for the purposes of Insolvency Code, since the nature of transaction needs to be ascertained to ensure that parties do not collude to the detriment to legitimate creditors. In the Ramesh Kymal v. M/S. Siemens Gamesa Renewable Power Private Limited case, Justice Chandrachud clarified that the ordinance suspending applications under the Corporate Insolvency Resolution Process after 25 March 2020, in accordance with Section 10A of the Insolvency Code, which had been introduced on 5 June 2020, would also affect any pending application that had been filed after 25 March 2020, since that was consciously the cut-off date chosen by the Parliament.

Chandrachud delivered a significant judgement in the Gujarat Urja Vikas Nigam Limited v. Amit Gupta case, where the termination of a Power Purchase Agreement with the corporate debtor, solely on account of its insolvency, was under challenge. The judgement clarified the jurisdiction of the National Company Law Tribunal and National Company Law Appellate Tribunal by holding that their jurisdiction is limited to adjudicating disputes which arise solely from or which relate to the insolvency of the Corporate Debtor. It also analysed the validity of ipso facto clauses in contracts, which allow termination solely on a party entering insolvency proceedings, across international materials and other jurisdictions. Noting that the validity of such clauses was unclear in India, the judgement resorted to dialogical remedy to direct the Parliament to provide legislative guidance. In the present case, however, the Supreme Court noted that the Power Purchase Agreement was the sole contract of the corporate debtor and held:

"Given that the terms used in Section 60(5)(c) are of wide import, as recognised in a consistent line of authority, we hold that the NCLT was empowered to restrain the appellant from terminating the PPA. However, our decision is premised upon a recognition of the centrality of the PPA in the present case to the success of the CIRP, in the factual matrix of this case, since it is the sole contract for the sale of electricity which was entered into by the Corporate Debtor. In doing so, we reiterate that the NCLT would have been empowered to set aside the termination of the PPA in this case because the termination took place solely on the ground of insolvency. The jurisdiction of the NCLT under Section 60(5)(c) of the IBC cannot be invoked in matters where a termination may take place on grounds unrelated to the insolvency of the corporate debtor. Even more crucially, it cannot even be invoked in the event of a legitimate termination of a contract based on an ipso facto clause like Article 9.2.1(e) herein, if such termination will not have the effect of making certain the death of the corporate debtor. As such, in all future cases, NCLT would have to be wary of setting aside valid contractual terminations which would merely dilute the value of the corporate debtor, and not push it to its corporate death by virtue of it being the corporate debtor's sole contract (as was the case in this matter's unique factual matrix)."

In the Arun Kumar Jagatramka v. Jindal Steel and Power Ltd. case, Chandrachud barred back-door entry under the Companies Act, 2013 to a promoter of a corporate debtor who is barred from submitting a resolution plan under the Insolvency Code, to submit a scheme of arrangement under the Companies Ac, 2013. The Supreme Court, while noting that promoters ineligible under the Insolvency Code cannot be allowed a back-door entry through the Companies Act, 2013, held that "[p]roposing a scheme of compromise or arrangement under Section 230 of the Act of 2013, while the company is undergoing liquidation under the provisions of the IBC lies in a similar continuum. Thus, the prohibitions that apply in the former situations must naturally also attach to the latter to ensure that like situations are treated equally."

The judgement was hailed for clarifying the inconsistencies in legal position caused by varying decisions of the National Company Law Tribunals. Through the judgement, the Supreme Court also upheld the constitutional validity of Regulation 2B of the Insolvency and Bankruptcy Board of India (Liquidation Process) Regulations, 2016, which provides that a party ineligible to propose a resolution plan under the Insolvency Code cannot be a party to a compromise or arrangement. The judgement was also considered of particular importance, since the Supreme Court noted that scheme and arrangements in the Corporate Insolvency Resolution were introduced only through the judicial intervention of the National Company Law Appellate Tribunal, and cautioned them to keep such an intervention to a minimum so as to not destroy the sanctity of the Insolvency Code.

=== Others ===
Chandrachud has also authored judgements on access to justice and the commitment to a transparent judicial system. In the Swapnil Tripathi v. Supreme Court of India case, a three judge bench of the Supreme Court ruled that proceedings of cases before it of constitutional and national importance must be streamed to the public. The judgement emphasised the right to know of every citizen and the principle of accountability of every institution. In his concurring opinion, Chandrachud emphasised the principles of open court and open justice and the public's right to know and drew upon comparative jurisprudence from across national frontiers. He stated that:

Live-streaming of proceedings is crucial to the dissemination of knowledge about judicial proceedings and granting full access to justice to the litigant… Live- streaming is a significant instrument of establishing the accountability of other stake - holders in the justice process, including the Bar… Full dissemination of knowledge and information about court proceedings through live-streaming thus sub serves diverse interests of stake holders and of society in the proper administration of justice.

The judgement was welcomed by lawyers and academicians alike. In 2021, as the chair-person of the eCommittee of the Supreme Court, Chandrachud has released a draft proposal for introducing live-streaming of court proceedings.

Chandrachud also delivered a concurring opinion in the case of the Central Public Information Officer v. Subhash Chandra Agarwal where he agreed with the majority that the office of the chief justice of India is a public authority and falls within the ambit of the Right to Information Act 2005. Chandrachud's opinion was widely discussed for evolving jurisprudence around the balancing of the right to privacy and the public interest. His opinion was also commented upon for expanding the ambit of the phrase 'public interest' to include information 'on the adequate performance of public authorities' which includes 'information on the selection of judges to the higher judiciary which must be placed in the public realm'. While the majority and the other concurring opinion applied the proportionality test to balance the right to privacy and public interest, Chandrachud expanded the application of the proportionality test to balance the rights of privacy and information.

On 12 August 2022, the Madhya Pradesh High Court discharged a rape accused of all charges on the ground that there was delay in registering the FIR. He was a part of the bench of Supreme Court which called the High Court judgement "heart-breaking" and "perverse".

== Notable dissents ==
Justice Chandrachud has dissented in various notable Supreme Court judgements. He has been called the 'judge who is not afraid to dissent'. His dissents have drawn the attention of the academia and media and one article notes that:

Justice Subba Rao was a libertarian keen on establishing individual rights. He stood up to Indira Gandhi's impulses. Justice Chandrachud too has a libertarian interpretation of constitutional rights. He has shown he is not afraid to dissent.

=== Aadhaar – The biometric project ===
Foremost amongst his notable dissents is his opinion in the Puttaswamy (II) v. Union of India case. In 2016, the Government of India enacted the Aadhaar Act, which is the world's largest biometric ID system. World Bank chief economist Paul Romer described Aadhaar as "the most sophisticated ID program in the world". As the basis for the overarching system had been laid down in 2010, the Aadhaar system was subject to a wide range of orders by the Supreme Court between 2013 and 2019. The Act was challenged before the Supreme Court on numerous grounds, which included a charge of bypassing the Upper House or Rajya Sabha by being passed as a Money Bill, of creating a surveillance state, and creating a class of citizens which would be excluded from the class of beneficiaries. Some groups also raised significant privacy concerns with the government database that held the biometric and personal information of every individual in the country.

In the judgement dated 28 September 2018, the Indian Supreme Court upheld that constitutional validity of the Act by a 4–1 majority, with Chandrachud penning the sole dissent. His dissent, which came to be called the 'dissent for the ages' noted numerous deficiencies in the proposed system and struck down in its entirety the Act as constituting a "fraud on the Constitution". In the celebrated dissent, he based his analysis of the Aadhaar architecture on five key aspects - surveillance, proportionality, Money Bill, inequality and individual identity.

==== Surveillance ====
Chandrachud noted that profiling and surveillance of individuals are possible under the Aadhaar framework as metadata can be used to track and profile people, third-parties can access the centralised database and the linking of databases may take place. He held:

The risks which the use of Aadhaar "for any purpose" carries is that when it is linked with different databases (managed by the State or by private entities), the Aadhaar number becomes the central unifying feature that connects the cell phone with geo-location data, one's presence and movement with a bank account and income tax returns, food and lifestyle consumption with medical records. This starts a "causal link" between information which was usually unconnected and was considered trivial. Thus, linking Aadhaar with different databases carries the potential of being profiled into a system, which could be used for commercial purposes. It also carries the capability of influencing the behavioural patterns of individuals, by affecting their privacy and liberty. Profiling individuals could be used to create co-relations between human lives, which are generally unconnected… When Aadhaar is seeded into every database, it becomes a bridge across discreet data silos, which allows anyone with access to this information to re-construct a profile of an individual's life.

At the time when the case was being heard before the Supreme Court, whistleblowers had warned of the possible implications of the infrastructure in creating a surveillance state. Following the judgement, academicians documented the growth in state surveillance

==== Privacy ====
He held that informational self determination (as a facet of privacy) and bodily integrity impart to the biometric details of every person a high degree of privacy. He held that the absence of consent within the Act, the extent of information disclosed, the expansive scope of the term "biometrics", the burden placed upon the individual to update her own biometrics, and lack of access to the record, cumulatively constitute a serious infringement of privacy.

==== Proportionality ====
Chandrachud drew from academic literature as well as jurisprudence across national frontiers on the proportionality standard and held that the burden to justify that the method adopted lies on the state and it must be demonstrated that the chosen method is both necessary and the least intrusive manner of achieving the stated objective. Circumspect of the Aadhaar infrastructure in plugging loopholes in welfare leakages, he held that:

The test of proportionality stipulates that the nature and extent of the State's interference with the exercise of a right (in this case, the rights to privacy, dignity, choice, and access to basic entitlements) must be proportionate to the goal it seeks to achieve (in this case, purported plugging of welfare leakage and better targeting… … by collecting identity information, the Aadhaar program treats every citizen as a potential criminal without even requiring the State to draw a reasonable belief that a citizen might be perpetrating a crime or an identity fraud. When the State is not required to have a reasonable belief and judicial determination to this effect, a program like Aadhaar, which infringes on the justifiable expectations of privacy of citizens flowing from the Constitution, is completely disproportionate to the objective sought to be achieved by the State… the state has failed to demonstrate that a less intrusive measure other than biometric authentication will not sub serve its purposes.

As part of his analysis, he noted the potential of the Aadhaar infrastructure to further bread inequality and the burden on the state to remedy any potential failings prior to the implementation of a nationwide infrastructure. He held:

Technological error would result in authentication failures. The concerns raised by UIDAI ought to have been resolved before the implementation of the Aadhaar project. Poor connectivity in rural India was a major concern. The majority of the Indian population lives in rural areas. Even a small percentage of error results in a population of crores being affected. Denial of subsidies and benefits to them due to the infirmities of biometric technology is a threat to good governance and social parity… No failure rate in the provision of social welfare benefits can be regarded as acceptable. Basic entitlements in matters such as food grain, can brook no error. To deny food is to lead a family to destitution, malnutrition and even death.

==== Money bill ====
Considered the 'heart' of his dissent, Chandrachud struck down of the entire Act as it was passed as a Money bill. Chandrachud noted that while "Ordinary bills can be passed only when they are agreed to by both Houses… the Constitution carves out a limited role for the Rajya Sabha in the passage of Money Bills." He noted that in the case of a Money Bill, the Rajya Sabha has no amending power, but merely the power to recommend changes which are not binding on the Lok Sabha. In other words, any change that the Rajya Sabha wishes to seek in the bill can be rejected in its entirety by the Lok Sabha.

Chandrachud proceeded by affirming that there is a degree of "constitutional trust" that attaches to a certificate by the Speaker of the House certifying a bill as a Money Bill and is open to judicial review:

The purpose of judicial review is to ensure that constitutional principles prevail in interpretation and governance. Institutions created by the Constitution are subject to its norms. No constitutional institution wields absolute power. No immunity has been attached to the certificate of the Speaker of the Lok Sabha from judicial review, for this reason… Constitutional courts have been entrusted with the duty to scrutinise the exercise of power by public functionaries under the Constitution. No individual holding an institutional office created by the Constitution can act contrary to constitutional parameters... If our Constitution has to survive the vicissitudes of political aggrandisement and to face up to the prevailing cynicism about all constitutional institutions, notions of power and authority must give way to duties and compliance with the rule of law

Chandrachud embarked on an analysis of the origins and rationale of bicameralism to conclude:

Bicameralism, when entrenched as a principle in a constitutional democracy, acts as a check against the abuse of power by constitutional means or its use in an oppressive manner. As a subset of the constitutional principle of division of power, bicameralism is mainly a safeguard against the abuse of the constitutional and political process. A bicameral national parliament can hold the government accountable and can check or restrain the misuse of government power. Among its other roles is that of representing local state units, acting as a body of expert review, and providing representation for diverse socio-economic interests or ethno-cultural minorities.

After embarking on a comparative analysis of bicameralism across the world, Chandrachud grounded Indian bicameralism in both a commitment to a federal polity as well as participative governance to hold that the Rajya Sabha is a "symbol against majoritarianism". He extensively analysed Article 110 of the Indian Constitution and emphasised that any bill within the ambit of Article 110 must contain "only provisions" dealing with the matter specified therein. Laying emphasis on the use of the words "if" and "only" within the provision, he cautioned that judges "cannot rewrite the Constitution, particularly where it is contrary to both text, context and intent." He noted that to allow bills that traverse outside the scope of Article 110 to be passed as money Bills would have "consequences in terms of the nature of the Bill and the legislative participation of the Rajya Sabha," and "reduce bicameralism to an illusion." He held:

A Bill, to be a Money Bill, must contain only provisions which fall within the ambit of the matters mentioned in Article 110…The Lok Sabha cannot introduce and pass a legislative measure in the garb of a Money Bill, which could otherwise have been amended or rejected by the Rajya Sabha. Bicameralism is a founding value of our democracy. It is a part of the basic structure of the Constitution. Introduction and passing of a Bill as a Money Bill, which does not qualify to be a Money Bill under Article 110(1) of the Constitution, is plainly unconstitutional… Introducing the Aadhaar Act as a Money Bill has bypassed the constitutional authority of the Rajya Sabha. The passage of the Aadhaar Act as a Money Bill is an abuse of the constitutional process. It deprived the Rajya Sabha from altering the provisions of the Bill by carrying out amendments. Superseding the authority of the Rajya Sabha is in conflict with the constitutional scheme and the legitimacy of democratic institutions. It constitutes a fraud on the Constitution… This debasement of a democratic institution cannot be allowed to pass. Institutions are crucial to democracy. Debasing them can only cause a peril to democratic structures.

One academician wrote shortly thereafter that Chandrachud's reading of the constitutional provision and assessment of the Aadhaar Act upheld "the delicate balance of bicameralism" which lies at the heart of India's parliamentary democracy"

==== Individual, state and identity ====
Chandrachud's judgement also analysed the intersection between identity and individuals. The dissent was noted for the emphasis on the protection of individual identity. Emphasising on the plurality of identities of an individual, he observed that:

Technologically, at this level, Aadhaar was to be a means of identification. Yet at another level, the Aadhaar project also offered itself as providing a documentary identity to persons who may not have possessed one at all... Identity includes the right to determine the forms through which identity is expressed and the right not to be identified. That concept is now "flipped" so that identification through identifiers becomes the only form of identity in the time of database governance. This involves a radical transformation in the position of the individual…Identity is a plural concept. The Constitution also recognises a multitude of identities through the plethora of rights that it safeguards. The technology deployed in the Aadhaar scheme reduces different constitutional identities into a single identity of a 12-digit number and infringes the right if an individual to identify himself/herself through a chosen means. Aadhaar is about identification and is an instrument which facilitates a proof of identity. It must not be allowed to obliterate constitutional identity.

He analysed the intersection between law and technology and observed that the biometric technology "which is the core of the Aadhaar programme is probabilistic in nature, leading to authentication failures." He observed that:

Dignity and the rights of individuals cannot be made to depend on algorithms or probabilities. Constitutional guarantees cannot be subject to the vicissitudes of technology.

==== Aftermath of the dissent ====
Chandrachud's dissent has received academic analysis and has led some scholars to write that the dissent ranks alongside the great dissents in the history of the Indian Supreme Court. Lead commentators and experts described the dissent as 'stirring', 'fiery', 'historic', 'stinging' and 'lone yet powerful'. Some invoke in reference to the dissent the famous lines of Chief Justice Charles Hughes that "a dissent in a court of last resort is an appeal to the brooding spirit of law, to the intelligence of a future day when a later decision may possibly correct the error into which the dissenting justice believes the court to have been betrayed." His dissent was noticed in judicial pronouncements elsewhere in the world.

In the judgement concerning the constitution validity of the Jamaican National Identification and Registration Act, Chief Justice Sykes relied on Justice Chandrachud's dissenting opinion to strike down the Act. He commended the dissent in the following terms:

In words, which I respectfully wish to adopt as my own, the learned Judge [i.e., Chandrachud J.] summarised the overall constitutional failings of the Aadhaar scheme thus … 'the technology deployed in the Aadhaar scheme reduces different constitutional identities into a single identity of a 12-digit number and infringes the right of an individual to identify herself or himself through a chosen means. Aadhaar is about identification and is an instrument which facilitates a proof of identity. It must not be allowed to obliterate constitutional identity…From reading the judgments, in this case, Dr Chandrachud J, in my respectful view, demonstrated a greater sensitivity to the issues of privacy and freedom that is not as evident in the judgments of the majority of the other judges who delivered concurring judgments. His Lordship had a clear-eyed view of the dangers of a state or anyone having control over one's personal information and generally, I preferred his approach to the issue over that of the other judges… I must also say that in the application of the standard I prefer the reasoning of Dr Chandrachud J to that of the majority.

One constitutional law expert observed that:

…a dissent is not limited to a footnote in the judicial lore of a nation, waiting for the years to pass by until the "intelligence of a future day" dawns. Sometimes, like the swallow flying south, a dissent becomes part of the global migration of ideas. It finds fertile soil far from home, there to bloom into the full richness that it has been denied in its own native environment… Sometimes, we need friends and colleagues in other parts of the world to hold up the mirror that we are unwilling or unable to look into. Perhaps it is the fate of the Aadhaar Dissent to travel around the world, a light in dark places, long before it is recognised by the brooding spirit of law in its homeland, and the error is corrected at last.

Later, Chandrachud's observations on the aspect of the Money Bill were resurrected by a constitution bench in the Roger Mathew v South Indian Bank Ltd case. Chief Justice Gogoi, writing for the majority held that the law on Money Bills must be "given an appropriate meaning and interpretation to avoid and prevent over-inclusiveness or under-inclusiveness". Noting deficiencies in the reasoning of the majority in the Aadhaar judgement and referring the question of law on money bills to a bench of a higher strength, he stated:

Upon an extensive examination of the matter, we notice that the majority in K.S. Puttaswamy (Aadhaar-5) pronounced the nature of the impugned enactment without first delineating the scope of Article 110(1) and principles for interpretation or the repercussions of such process. It is clear to us that the majority dictum in K.S. Puttaswamy (Aadhaar-5) did not substantially discuss the effect of the word 'only' in Article 110(1) and offers little guidance on the repercussions of a finding when some of the provisions of an enactment passed as a "Money Bill" do not conform to Article 110(1)(a) to (g)... Being a Bench of equal strength as that in K.S. Puttaswamy (Aadhaar-5), we accordingly direct that this batch of matters be placed before Hon'ble the Chief Justice of India, on the administrative side, for consideration by a larger Bench.

Chandrachud agreed with the majority that the law on the Money Bills must be clarified. Consequently, the matter is pending further consideration by the Supreme Court.

On 11 January 2021, Chandrachud further was the lone dissenter against the dismissal of review petitions filed against the judgement dated 28 September 2018 (which upheld the constitutionality of Aadhar) on the ground that the aspect of what constitutes a 'Money Bill' under Article 110 of the Indian Constitution, which was the heart of the matter and a potential fraud on the constitution, has been referred to a larger bench by another constitutional bench of the Supreme Court, which is yet to be constituted.

=== Free speech ===
Chandrachud delivered a dissent in the Romila Thapar & Ors. v. Union of India case, where an investigation by a Special Investigation Team (SIT) was sought by five human rights activists who were charged and arrested for commission of offences under the Unlawful Activities (Prevention) Act, 1947 following the violence that broke out during an Elgar Parishad event in 2018. The majority refused the constitution of the SIT. In his dissent, Chandrachud directed that the investigation should be conducted by a SIT and reprimanded the Pune Police for their mala fide behaviour in aiding the conduct of the "media trial".

His dissent was reported for upholding the freedom of speech and the principle of fairness under Article 14 and 21 of the Indian Constitution. He observed that "dissent is the safety valve of democracy. If dissent is not allowed, then the pressure cooker may burst". He also opined that it was necessary to draw a balance between dissent and unlawful activities. He held that:

Dissent is a symbol of a vibrant democracy. Voices in opposition cannot be muzzled by persecuting those who take up unpopular causes. Where, however, the expression of dissent enters upon the prohibited field of an incitement to violence or the subversion of a democratically elected government by recourse to unlawful means, the dissent ceases to be a mere expression of opinion. Unlawful activities which violate the law have to be dealt with in accordance with it.

Justice Chandrachud also emphasised the necessity of ensuring a fair and impartial investigation which he regarded as an 'integral component' of the guarantee against arbitrariness under Article 14 and of the right to life and personal liberty under Article 21 of the Indian Constitution. He observed that "if this Court were not to stand by the principles which we have formulated, we may witness a soulful requiem to liberty".

=== Gender justice ===
Chandrachud, along with Justice Rohinton Fali Nariman delivered a dissent in the Kantaru Rajeevaru v. Indian Young Lawyers Association case. He held that the decision of five judges in the Sabarimala case which held that women between the age of ten and fifty shall not be denied entry to the Sabarimala temple is not a fit case for the exercise of review jurisdiction as the judgement does not suffer from an error apparent on the face of record. The dissent observed that the executive is under a constitutional obligation to implement the decisions of the Supreme Court even if they were not parties before them. Justice Nariman observed:

Bona fide criticism of a judgment, albeit of the highest court of the land, is certainly permissible, but thwarting, or encouraging persons to thwart, the directions or orders of the highest court cannot be countenanced in our Constitutional scheme of things.

=== Election speech ===
Chandrachud authored the minority opinion for himself and two other judges in the Abiram Singh v. C.D Commachen case which concerned the interpretation of Section 123(3) of the Representation of the Peoples Act, 1951. The provision states that appealing for votes based on "his" religion, race, caste, community or language amounts to a corrupt practice by a candidate. The question concerned was whether the word 'his' qualified only the candidate or the election agent, or whether it included the person to whom the appeal was addressed. The majority affirmed a broader reading of the term to include a prohibition on the appeal to the religion, race, caste community or language of the voters themselves. Chandrachud wrote:

...the Constitution… recognises the position of religion, caste, language and gender in the social life of the nation. Individual histories both of citizens and collective groups in our society are associated through the ages with histories of discrimination and injustice on the basis of these defining characteristics…

While "the majority viewed group identities as sites of division and fracturing of the fragile democratic consensus, the dissent questioned the very existence of any such consensus." Chandrachud held, as a noted columnist wrote, that with the coming of democracy, these identities had become the sites of redressing historical discrimination through political mobilisation. To now deny that opportunity would be to simply perpetuate a status quo built upon exclusion and marginalisation.

=== Tax ===
In the Jindal Stainless Ltd. v. The State of Haryana case, Chandrachud authored the minority opinion on the constitutional validity of entry tax imposed by states. He differed from the view of the majority which held that free trade throughout the territory under Article 301 of the Constitution of India does not mean freedom from tax and observed that such a position violated constitutional principles. He held that entire nation must be viewed as one economic unit in the following terms:

Article 301 sub serves the constitutional goal of integrating the nation into an economic entity comprising of a common market for goods and services.

He propounded the 'direct and inevitable effect test' to identify whether a tax amounts to a restriction on the freedom of trade and commerce.

== Notable speeches ==
Chandrachud has been a speaker at conferences organised by bodies of the United Nations including United Nations High Commission for Human Rights, International Labour Organisation and United Nations Environmental Program, the World Bank and Asian Development Bank. He delivered a lecture titled "Global Constitutionalism in the Age of Transnational Judicial Conversations in Human Rights", organised by the Supreme Court of Hawai'i and the University of Hawai'i on 6 June 2018. He has delivered numerous speeches in India at premier law institutions as well as events organised by civil society. His most recent speeches include:

Speeches
Date	Topic	Location
September 2018	Rule of Law in a Constitutional Democracy	19th Annual Bodh Raj Sawhney Memorial, NLUD, Delhi
December 2018	Law and Storytelling	Increasing Diversity by Increasing Access (IDIA), Delhi
December 2018	Why the Constitution matters	Bombay High Court
February 2019	Law, Culture and Identity	Kala Ghoda Arts Festival, Bombay
March 2019	A Borrowed Constitution: A fact or a myth?	Annual Nani Palkhiwala Lecture, Delhi
April 2019	Green Law Lecture	O. P. Jindal Global University
August 2019	Imagining Freedom Through Art	Literature Live, Annual Independence Day Lecture, Bombay
December 2019	Adding Nuance to Human Rights Discourse	International Institute of Human Rights Society
February 2020	The hues that make India from plurality to pluralism	P.D. Desai Memorial Lecture, Gujarat
July 2020	A changing society and constitutional continuity: experiences in the pursuit of justice	ILS, Pune
November 2020	Constitutionalism, Liberal Democracy and Enlightened Citizenship	JGLS Worldwide Forum
November 2020	Visualising the Constitution through Artistic Prisms- Stories of Aspiration and Emancipation	Kalakshetra, Chennai
April 2021	Why Representation Matters	Inaugural Event of CEDE, Virtual Lecture on Livelaw

In February 2020, he delivered the speech titled 'The hues that make India: from plurality to pluralism' at the P D Desai Memorial Lecture in Gujarat. He stated:

…the employment of state machinery to curb dissent instils fear and creates a chilling atmosphere on free speech which violates the rule of law and detracts from the constitutional vision of a pluralist society…The true test of a democracy is its ability to ensure the creation and protection of spaces where every individual can voice their opinion without the fear of retribution…A state committed to the rule of law ensures that the state apparatus is not employed to curb legitimate and peaceful protest but to create spaces conducive for deliberation. Within the bounds of law, liberal democracies ensure that their citizens enjoy the right to express their views in every conceivable manner, including the right to protest and express dissent against prevailing laws. The blanket labelling of such dissent as 'anti-national' or 'anti-democratic' strikes at the heart of our commitment to the protection of constitutional values and the promotion of a deliberative democracy.

In an impassioned appeal to pluralism and the celebration of diversity, he stated:

The framers of the Constitution rejected the notion of a Hindu India and a Muslim India. They recognised only the Republic of India…A united India is not one characterised by a single identity devoid of its rich plurality, both of cultures and of values. National unity denotes a shared culture of values and a commitment to the fundamental ideals of the Constitution in which all individuals are guaranteed not just the fundamental rights but also conditions for their free and safe exercise. Pluralism depicts not merely a commitment to the preservation of diversity, but a commitment to the fundamental postulates of individual and equal dignity. In this sense, pluralism furthers the basic postulates of the Constitution and nourishes and provides content to the goal of national unity...No single individual or institution can claim a monopoly over the idea of India…what is of utmost relevance today is our ability and commitment to preserve, conserve and build on the rich pluralistic history we have inherited.

The speech was reported as a plea to protect the right to dissent in a free and democratic society.

Recently, in a speech delivered in December 2020 on "Legal Professionals with Disabilities" for the International Summit on Legal Professionals with Disabilities, ILS Pune, he highlighted the inaccessibility of the Common Law Admission Test for the visually challenged. This remark was noticed and promptly addressed by the Consortium of National Law Universities who assured the public of a course-correction.

== e-Committee ==
Chandrachud was the chairperson of the e-Committee of the Supreme Court of India. The e-Committee is the body tasked with the implementation of the e-Courts Project in India which aims to digitise the judiciary at the level of High Courts and District Courts. Currently the e-Court's Project is in Phase II, which in addition to providing necessary hardware to courts for meeting technological demands, has also undertaken to introduce various digital services for the benefit of the lawyers and general public. Under the chairpersonship of Chandrachud, the e-Committee has introduced and overseen the implementation of, inter alia, the following measures:

=== Virtual Courts ===
Chandrachud inaugurated virtual courts in Delhi on 13 May 2020, in Pune on 15 May 2020 and in Chennai on 26 May 2020. Virtual Courts allow adjudication of cases on a virtual platform. Communication, sentencing, payment of fines or compensation takes place online. The facility is functional 24x7. At present this service is available for traffic violations under Motor Vehicles Act, which was amended in 2019.

=== National Judicial Data Grid (NJDG) ===
National Judicial Data Grid is a flagship project of e-Committee that tracks the country's pending cases, ensuring transparency in the functioning of the judicial system by making this information available in the public domain.

=== Inter-Operable Criminal Justice System (ICJS) ===
ICJS allows live electronic exchange of data between courts and police. FIR and charge sheet details are electronically received in courts through a CIS software system.

=== e-Filing Software 3.0 ===
A new e-Filing software application has been developed, enabling electronic filing of legal papers and promoting paperless filing. The upgraded version of the e-Filing software is more user-friendly with a simpler registration process for advocates. It also, inter alia, enables advocates to add their partners and clients, provides online vakalatnama, readymade templates for pleadings, provision for online recording of oath and digital signing of case papers.

=== e-Payments ===
The e-Committee has introduced the facility of online payment of court fees, fines, penalty and judicial deposits.

=== e-Sewa Kendras ===
e-Sewa Kendras have been created in High Courts and in one District Court in each State to provide digital aid to those who do not have access to internet or electronic equipment for accessing the services provided under the e-Courts Project. The litigants and lawyers can, inter alia, obtain case information, obtain copies of judgements and orders and use the e-Filing services at the e-Sewa Kendras.

=== National Service and Tracking of Electronic Process (NSTEP) ===
The e-Committee has digitised the delivery of processes through the National Service and Tracking of Electronic Process (NSTEP). It consists of a centralised process service tracking application and a mobile app for bailiffs/process servers. NSTEP is used for the speedy delivery of processes and reducing inordinate delays in process serving. NSTEP mobile application provided to bailiffs helps in real-time and transparent tracking of service.

=== Judgement search portal ===
A judgement search portal has been created which is a repository of all the judgements and final orders passed by the High Courts and District Court. The portal uses a free text search engine, which provides judgements based on a given keyword or combination of keywords. The portal has also been designed keeping in mind the needs of the persons with disabilities. It provides the facility of audio captcha along with text captcha. It also uses combo boxes making it easier for persons with visual disabilities to access the website.

Other initiatives include installation of touch screen kiosks at court complexes to obtain case information, e-Courts Services application for mobiles and the e-Committee YouTube Channel.

=== Live streaming of court proceedings ===
The e-Committee has undertaken the task of introducing live streaming of court proceedings. It has released model draft rules to invite comments from all stakeholders. The rules come in the backdrop of the judgement of the Supreme Court in the Swapnil Tripathi v Supreme Court of India case which held that live broadcast of proceedings of the Supreme Court flows from the right to access justice under the Indian Constitution.

During the tenure of Chandrachud, the services provided by e-Courts Project recorded more than 354.1 crores e-transactions during 2019–2020, which is the highest number of e-transactions recorded for any electronic governance related project in India. The e-Committee of the Supreme Court of India was also awarded the Digital India Award (Platinum Award) for Excellence in Digital Governance for the year 2020 by the President of India. The e-Committee also undertakes training of advocates, judges and court staff on issues of technological awareness. It conducted online training for over 1.6 lakh lawyers, judges, court staff during pandemic from May 2020 to December 2020.

=== Awards ===
The Harvard Law School awarded the Center on the Legal Profession Award for Global Leadership to Chandrachud.

== Personal life ==
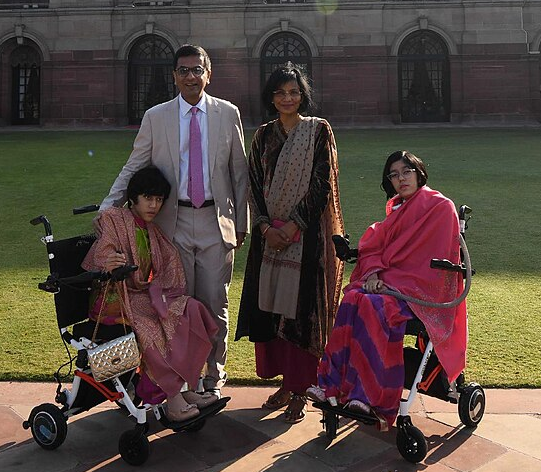
D.Y. Chandrachud with his family

His first wife, Rashmi, died in 2007 due to cancer. He later married lawyer Kalpana Das. He has two sons and two foster daughters.

Legal offices
Preceded by Shiva Kirti Singh	Chief Justice of Allahabad High Court; 31 October 2013 – 12 May 2016	Succeeded by Dilip Babasaheb Bhosale
Preceded by Uday Umesh Lalit	Chief Justice of India; 9 November 2022 – 10 November 2024	Succeeded by Sanjiv Khanna
