= Chandrachud =

Chandrachud is a prominent Indian family who were nobles, sardars, and jagirdars in Pune in the Maratha Empire. They belong to the Deshastha Rigvedi Brahmin community. Diwan Yashwant Gangadhar Chandrachud, a member of the family, held twenty-two villages as watan, including Newasa Budruk as Jagirdar. Chandrachud Wada, which still stands in Pune, was the seat of the Chandrachuds of the Maratha Empire until 1818, when the Maratha peshwas lost control to the British East India Company after the Third Anglo-Maratha War.

== Notables ==
=== Jurists and lawyers ===
- Y. V. Chandrachud, 16th and longest-serving Chief Justice of India
- Dhananjaya Y. Chandrachud, son of Y. V. Chandrachud, 50th Chief Justice of India
