= Dilip Babasaheb Bhosale =

Judicial Member of Lokpal Committee

Hon'ble Justice Dilip Babasaheb Bhosale

Judicial Member of Lokpal
- In office 23 March 2019 – 12 January 2020
- Appointed by: Ram Nath Kovind
- Preceded by: Position Established

45th Chief Justice of Allahabad High Court
- In office 30 July 2016 – 23 October 2018
- Nominated by: T. S. Thakur
- Appointed by: Pranab Mukherjee
- Preceded by: D. Y. Chandrachud
- Succeeded by: Govind Mathur

Judge of Hyderabad High Court
- In office 8 December 2014 – 29 July 2016
- Nominated by: H. L. Dattu
- Appointed by: Pranab Mukherjee

Judge of Karnataka High Court
- In office 6 January 2012 – 7 December 2014
- Nominated by: S. H. Kapadia
- Appointed by: Pratibha Patil

Judge of Bombay High Court
- In office 22 January 2001 – 5 January 2012
- Nominated by: Adarsh Sein Anand
- Appointed by: K. R. Narayanan

Personal details
- Born: 24 October 1956 (age 70) Bombay, Bombay State, India
- Spouse: Arundhati (m. 1982)
- Children: 2
- Parent: Babasaheb Bhosale (father)
- Education: Government Law College, Mumbai

Dilip Babasaheb Bhosale (born 24 October 1956) is the ex-Judicial Member of Lokpal Committee. He is a former Chief Justice of the Allahabad High Court. He has also served as Acting Chief Justice of Hyderabad High Court and as a judge of Hyderabad High Court, Karnataka High Court and Bombay High Court.

== Background ==
Bhosale hails from Satara district of Maharashtra. His father Babasaheb Bhosale was the Chief Minister of Maharashtra from 1982 to 83 while his uncle Shivajirao was the Vice-Chancellor of Marathwada University situated at Aurangabad. Justice Bhosale studied law at Government Law College, Mumbai.

== Career ==
He joined the Bar in June 1980 when he began practice at the High Court of Bombay. Bhosale was an Assistant Government Pleader and Assistant Public Prosecutor at the court from 1986 to 1991. He was appointed an Additional Judge at the Bombay High Court in January 2001 and promoted to be a Permanent Judge two years later. Beginning 2012, Bhosale was made a sitting Judge at the High Court of Karnataka. On 30 July 2016, he was promoted to Chief Justice of Allahabad High Court.
On 23 October 2018, he retired from High Court.

== Notable judgements ==
- A division bench consisting of Bhosale and Justice Yashwant Varma ruled that the Election Commission of India has powers to remove duplicate and fake names from the electoral rolls till the last date of filing the nominations.
