= State court =

State court may refer to:

== Courts of constituent states of English-speaking federated states ==
- State court (United States)
- Judiciary of Australia#State and territory courts

== Courts of English-speaking unitary states ==
- State Courts of Singapore

== Non-English names that may be translated as "state court" ==
- Landesgericht (Germany)
- Judiciary of Brazil#State courts
- State courts of Ethiopia

== See also ==
- High courts of India, the highest courts of appellate jurisdiction in each state and union territory of India
- Provincial court
