= E-courts In India =

The e-Courts project was conceptualized on the basis of the National Policy and Action Plan for Implementation of information and communication technology (ICT) in the Indian Judiciary–2005 submitted by e-Committee (Supreme Court of India), with a vision to transform the Indian Judiciary by ICT enablement of Courts. In other words, the e-Court project is all about providing ICT enablement of courts to make the justice delivery system affordable and cost-effective. The e-Courts Integrated Mission Mode Project (Phase-I) is one of the national e-Governance projects being implemented in High Courts and district/subordinate Courts of the Country. The Government approved the computerization of 14,249 district & subordinate Courts under the project by March 2014 with a total budget of Rs. 935 crore. The objective of the e-Courts project is to provide designated services to litigants, lawyers, and the judiciary by universal computerization of district and subordinate courts in the country and enhancement of ICT enablement of the justice system.

The Phase-II of the Project has been approved by the e-Committee of Supreme Court of India in January 2014 for further enhancement of ICT enablement of Courts with a broad objective of:

1. Computerization of more than 8000 new courts, legal service authority offices, and state judicial academies with strengthened hardware.
2. Connecting all the Courts in the country to the National Judicial Data Grid through WAN and additional redundant connectivity to enable integration with the proposed interoperable criminal justice system.
3. Citizen centric facilities such as centralized filling centers and touch screen based kiosks be based at each Court complex.
4. Creating a robust Court management system through digitization, document management, Judicial knowledge management, and learning management.
5. Facilitating better performance in courts through change management and process re-engineering as well as improvement in process servicing through hand-held devices.
6. Enhance ICT enablement through e-filling, e-Payment, and use of mobile application.

In October 2014, the High Court of Kerala announced that two e-courts would be established. It implemented SMS notices for the filing, registering, and posting of cases in December 2014.

== See also ==
- NJRS
