= High courts of India =

High Courts Of India
- Location: Respective States and Union Territory of India
- Authorised by: Indian Constitution
- Appeals to: Supreme Court of India

The high courts of India are the highest courts of appellate jurisdiction in each state and union territory of India. However, a high court exercises its original civil and criminal jurisdiction only if the subordinate courts are not authorized by law to try such matters for lack of peculiar or territorial jurisdiction. High courts may also enjoy original jurisdiction in certain matters, if so designated, especially by the constitution, a state law or union law.

The work of most high courts primarily consists of adjudicating on appeals from lower courts and writ petitions in terms of Articles 226 and 227 of the Constitution. Writ jurisdiction is also the original jurisdiction of a high court.

Each state is divided into judicial districts presided over by a district judge and a session judge. He is known as the district judge when he presides over a civil case and the session's judge when he presides over a criminal case. He is the highest judicial authority below a high court judge. Below him, there are courts of civil jurisdiction, known by different names in different states. Under Article 141 of the constitution, all courts in India, including high courts – are bound by the judgements and orders of the Supreme Court of India by precedence.

Judges in a high court are appointed by the President of India in consultation with the Chief Justice of India and the governor of the state under Article 217, Chapter Five of Part VI of the Constitution, but through subsequent judicial interpretations, the primacy of the appointment process is on the hands of the Judicial Collegium. High courts are headed by a chief justice. The chief justices rank fourteenth (within their respective states) and seventeenth (outside their respective states) on the Order of precedence in India. The number of judges in a court is decided by dividing the average institution of main cases during the last five years by the national average, or the average rate of disposal of main cases per judge per year in that high court, whichever is higher.

The Calcutta High Court is the oldest high court in the country, brought into existence on 14 May 1862. High courts that handle numerous cases of a particular region have permanent benches established there. Benches are also present in states which come under the jurisdiction of a court outside its territorial limits. Smaller states with few cases may have circuit benches established. Circuit benches (known as circuit courts in some parts of the world) are temporary courts which hold proceedings for a few selected months in a year. Thus cases built up during this interim period are judged when the circuit court is in session. According to a study conducted by Bengaluru-based N.G.O, Daksh, on 21 high courts in collaboration with the Ministry of Law and Justice in March 2015, it was found that average pendency of a case in high courts in India is 3 years.

The buildings of Bombay High Court (as part of Victorian Gothic and Art Deco Ensembles of Mumbai) and Punjab and Haryana High Court (as part of The Architectural Work of Le Corbusier) are UNESCO World Heritage Sites.

The high courts are substantially different from and should not be confused with the state courts of other federations, in that the Constitution of India includes detailed provisions for the uniform organisation and operation of all high courts. In other federations like the United States, state courts are formed under the constitutions of the separate states and as a result vary greatly from state to state.

== High courts ==
The Calcutta High Court in Kolkata (est. 1862), Bombay High Court in Mumbai (est. 1862), and Madras High Court in Chennai (est. 1862) are the three oldest high courts in India.

The Andhra Pradesh High Court and Telangana High Court are the newest high courts, established on 1 January 2019 according to the Andhra Pradesh Reorganisation Act, 2014.

The following are the 25 high courts in India, sorted by name, year established, act by which it was established, jurisdiction, principal seat (headquarters), permanent benches (subordinate to the principal seat), circuit benches (functional a few days in a month/year), the maximum number of judges sanctioned, and the presiding chief justice of the high court:

| # | Court | Established | Act | Jurisdiction | Principal seat | Bench(es) | Judges | | | Chief Justice |
|---|---|---|---|---|---|---|---|---|---|---|
| 1 | Allahabad High Court | 17 March 1866 | Indian High Courts Act 1861 | Uttar Pradesh | Prayagraj | Lucknow (Note: Permanent bench.) | 160 | 119 | 41 | Arun Bhansali (list) |
| 2 | Andhra Pradesh High Court | 1 January 2019 | Andhra Pradesh Reorganisation Act, 2014 | Andhra Pradesh | Amaravati | — | 37 | 28 | 9 | Lisa Gill (list) |
| 3 | Bombay High Court | 14 August 1862 | Indian High Courts Act 1861 | Goa, Dadra and Nagar Haveli and Daman and Diu, Maharashtra | Mumbai | Aurangabad, Nagpur, Panaji Kolhapur (Note: Circuit bench.) | 94 | 71 | 23 | Mahesh Chandra Tripathi (list) |
| 4 | Calcutta High Court | 1 July 1862 | Indian High Courts Act 1861 | Andaman and Nicobar Islands, West Bengal | Kolkata | Port Blair; Jalpaiguri | 72 | 54 | 18 | Ravindra Vithalrao Ghuge (list) |
| 5 | Chhattisgarh High Court | 1 November 2000 | Madhya Pradesh Reorganisation Act, 2000 | Chhattisgarh | Bilaspur | — | 22 | 17 | 5 | Krushna Ram Mohapatra (list) |
| 6 | Delhi High Court | 31 October 1966 | Delhi High Court Act, 1966 | Delhi | New Delhi | — | 60 | 45 | 15 | Devendra Kumar Upadhyaya (list) |
| 7 | Gauhati High Court | 1 March 1948 | Government of India Act 1935 | Arunachal Pradesh, Assam, Mizoram, Nagaland | Guwahati | Aizawl, Itanagar, Kohima | 30 | 22 | 8 | Ashutosh Kumar (list) |
| 8 | Gujarat High Court | 1 May 1960 | Bombay Reorganisation Act, 1960 | Gujarat | Ahmedabad | — | 52 | 39 | 13 | Sunita Agarwal (list) |
| 9 | Himachal Pradesh High Court | 25 January 1971 | State of Himachal Pradesh Act, 1970 | Himachal Pradesh | Shimla | — | 17 | 13 | 4 | Gurmeet Singh Sandhawalia (list) |
| 10 | Jammu & Kashmir and Ladakh High Court | 26 March 1928 | Letters patent issued by then Maharaja of Kashmir, Jammu and Kashmir Reorganisation Act, 2019 | Jammu and Kashmir, Ladakh | Srinagar/Jammu (Note: Srinagar is the summer capital; Jammu is the winter capital.) | Ladakh | 25 | 19 | 6 | Pushpendra Singh Bhati (list) |
| 11 | Jharkhand High Court | 15 November 2000 | Bihar Reorganisation Act, 2000 | Jharkhand | Ranchi | — | 25 | 20 | 5 | Mahesh Sharadchandra Sonak (list) |
| 12 | Karnataka High Court | 1884 | Mysore High Court Act, 1884 | Karnataka | Bengaluru | Dharwad, Kalaburagi | 62 | 47 | 15 | Vibhu Bakhru (list) |
| 13 | Kerala High Court | 1 November 1956 | States Reorganisation Act, 1956 | Kerala, Lakshadweep | Kochi | — | 47 | 35 | 12 | Soumen Sen (list) |
| 14 | Madhya Pradesh High Court | 2 January 1936 | Government of India Act 1935 | Madhya Pradesh | Jabalpur | Gwalior, Indore | 53 | 40 | 13 | Alpesh Yeshvant Kogje (list) |
| 15 | Madras High Court | 26 June 1862 | Indian High Courts Act 1861 | Puducherry, and Tamil Nadu | Chennai | Madurai | 75 | 56 | 19 | Sushrut Arvind Dharmadhikari (list) |
| 16 | Manipur High Court | 25 March 2013 | North-Eastern Areas (Reorganisation) and Other Related Laws (Amendment) Act, 2012 | Manipur | Imphal | — | 5 | 4 | 1 | M. Sundar (list) |
| 17 | Meghalaya High Court | 23 March 2013 | North-Eastern Areas (Reorganisation) and Other Related Laws (Amendment) Act, 2012 | Meghalaya | Shillong | — | 4 | 4 | 0 | Revati Mohite Dere (list) |
| 18 | Orissa High Court | 3 April 1948 | Orissa High Court Ordinance, 1948 | Odisha | Cuttack | — | 33 | 24 | 9 | Harish Tandon (list) |
| 19 | Patna High Court | 2 September 1916 | Letters Patent issued by then British Crown | Bihar | Patna | — | 53 | 40 | 13 | Valluri Kameswar Rao (list) |
| 20 | Punjab and Haryana High Court | 15 August 1947 | Punjab High Court Ordinance, 1947 | Chandigarh, Haryana, Punjab | Chandigarh | — | 85 | 64 | 21 | Ashwani Kumar Mishra (list) |
| 21 | Rajasthan High Court | 21 June 1949 | Rajasthan High Court Ordinance, 1949 | Rajasthan | Jodhpur | Jaipur | 50 | 38 | 12 | Sanjay Kumar Agrawal (list) |
| 22 | Sikkim High Court | 16 May 1975 | The 36th Amendment to the Indian Constitution | Sikkim | Gangtok | — | 3 | 3 | 0 | Muhamed Mustaque Aymantakath (list) |
| 23 | Telangana High Court | 1 January 2019 | Andhra Pradesh Reorganisation Act, 2014 | Telangana | Hyderabad | — | 42 | 32 | 10 | Aparesh Kumar Singh (list) |
| 24 | Tripura High Court | 26 March 2013 | North-Eastern Areas (Reorganisation) and Other Related Laws (Amendment) Act, 2012 | Tripura | Agartala | — | 5 | 4 | 1 | Mamidanna Satyaratna Ramachandra Rao (list) |
| 25 | Uttarakhand High Court | 9 November 2000 | Uttar Pradesh Reorganisation Act, 2000 | Uttarakhand | Nainital | — | 11 | 9 | 2 | Manoj Kumar Gupta (list) |
| Total | | | | | | | 1122 | 847 | 275 | - |

== High courts by states/union territories ==
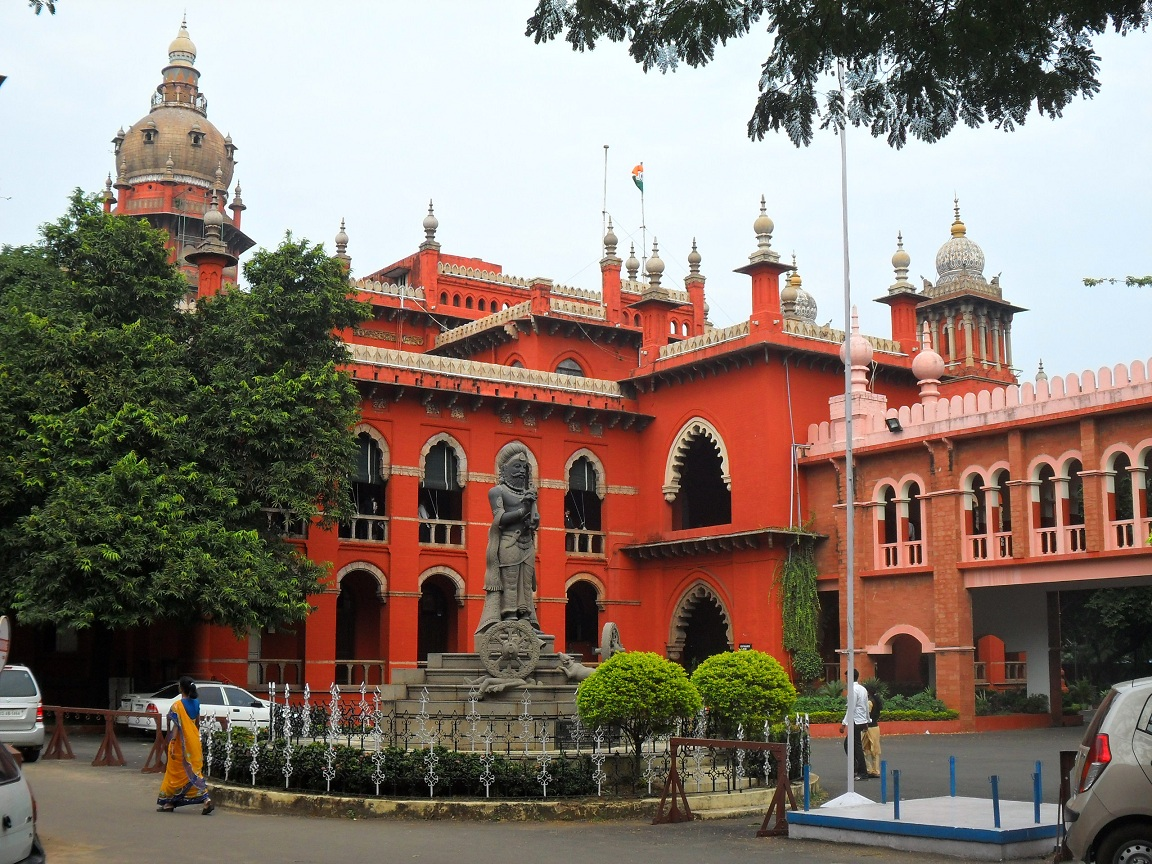
The Madras High Court building in Chennai, one of the first three high courts of India

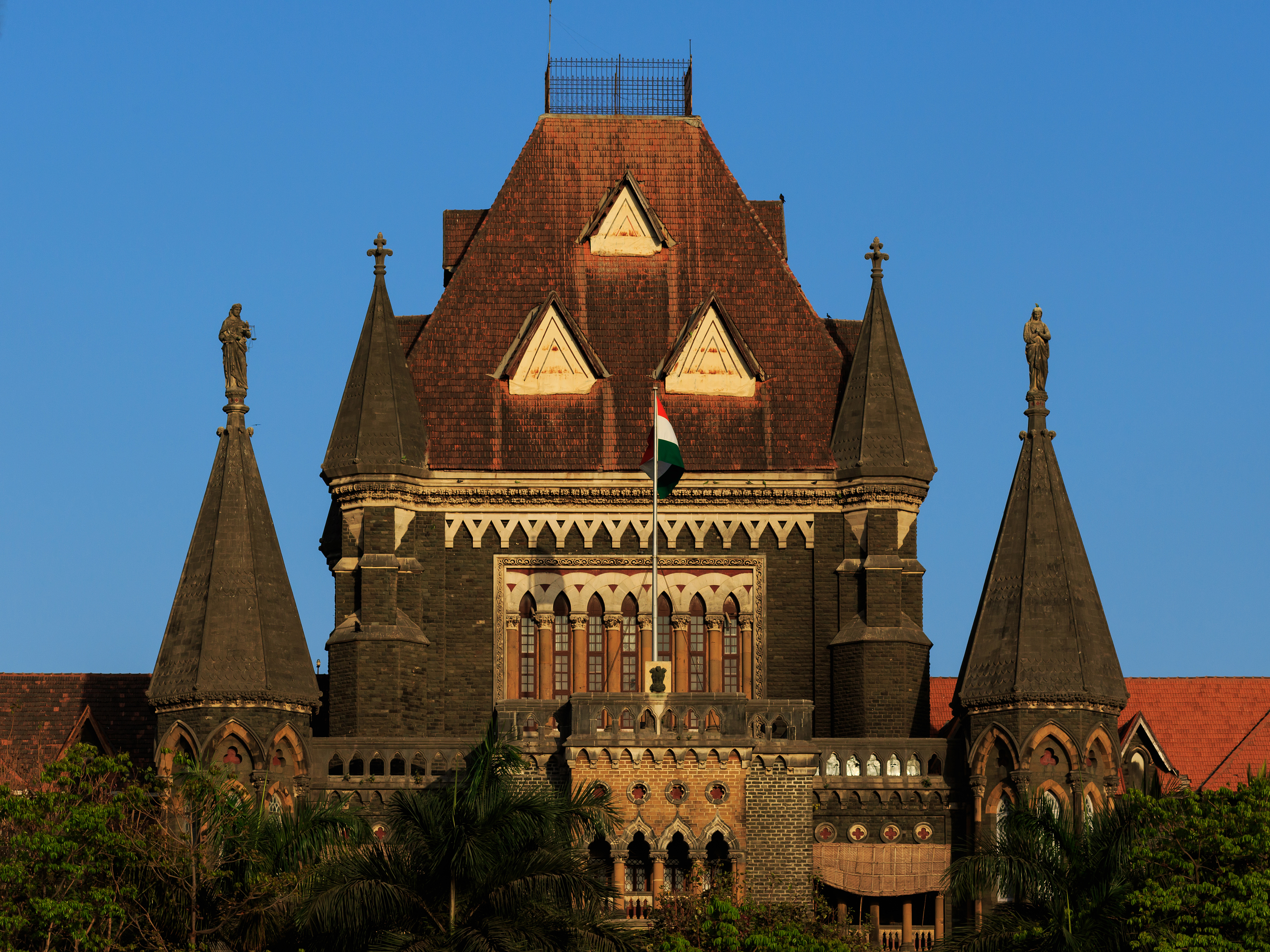
The Bombay High Court building in Mumbai, one of the first three high courts of India and a World Heritage Site

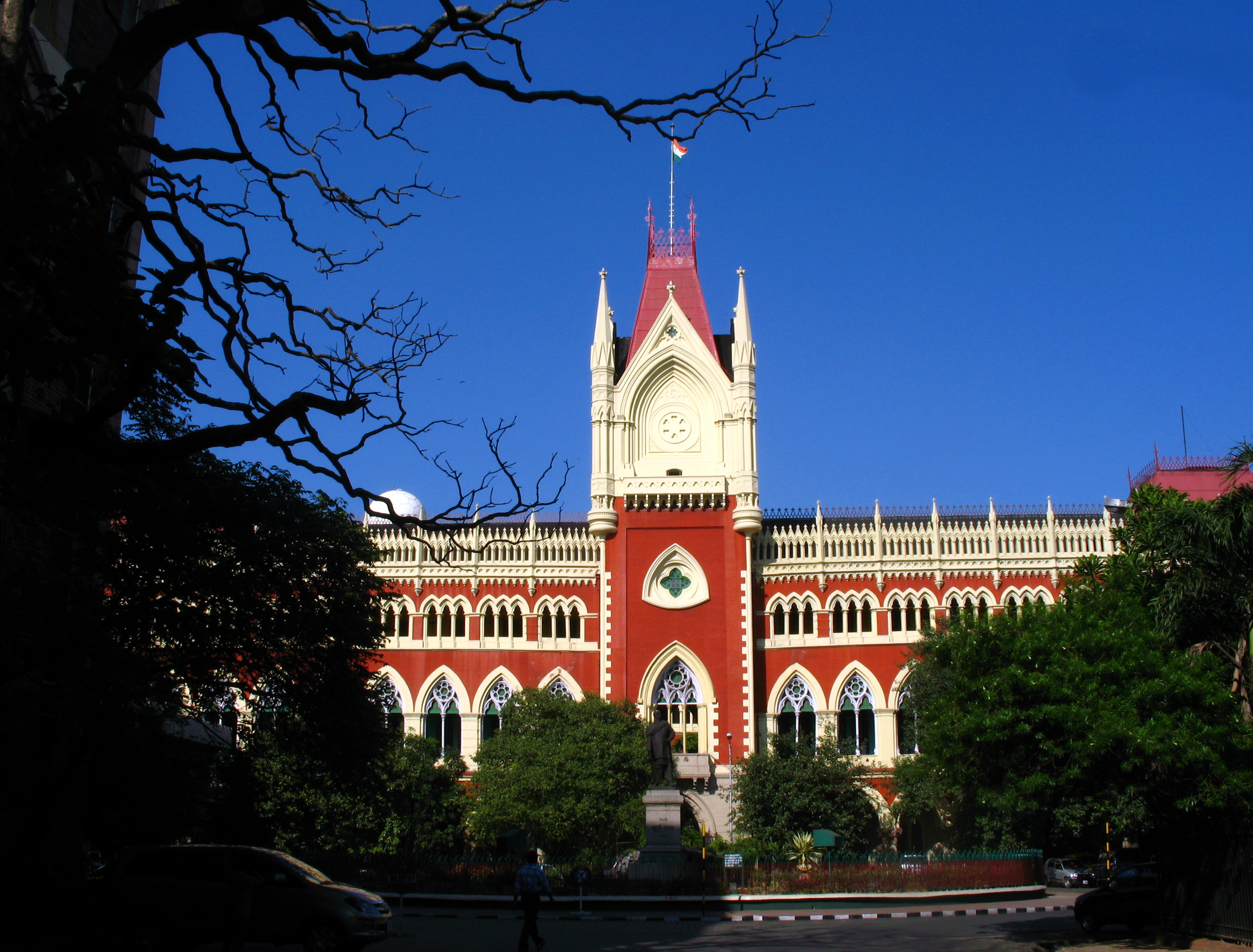
The Calcutta High Court building in Kolkata, oldest high court of India

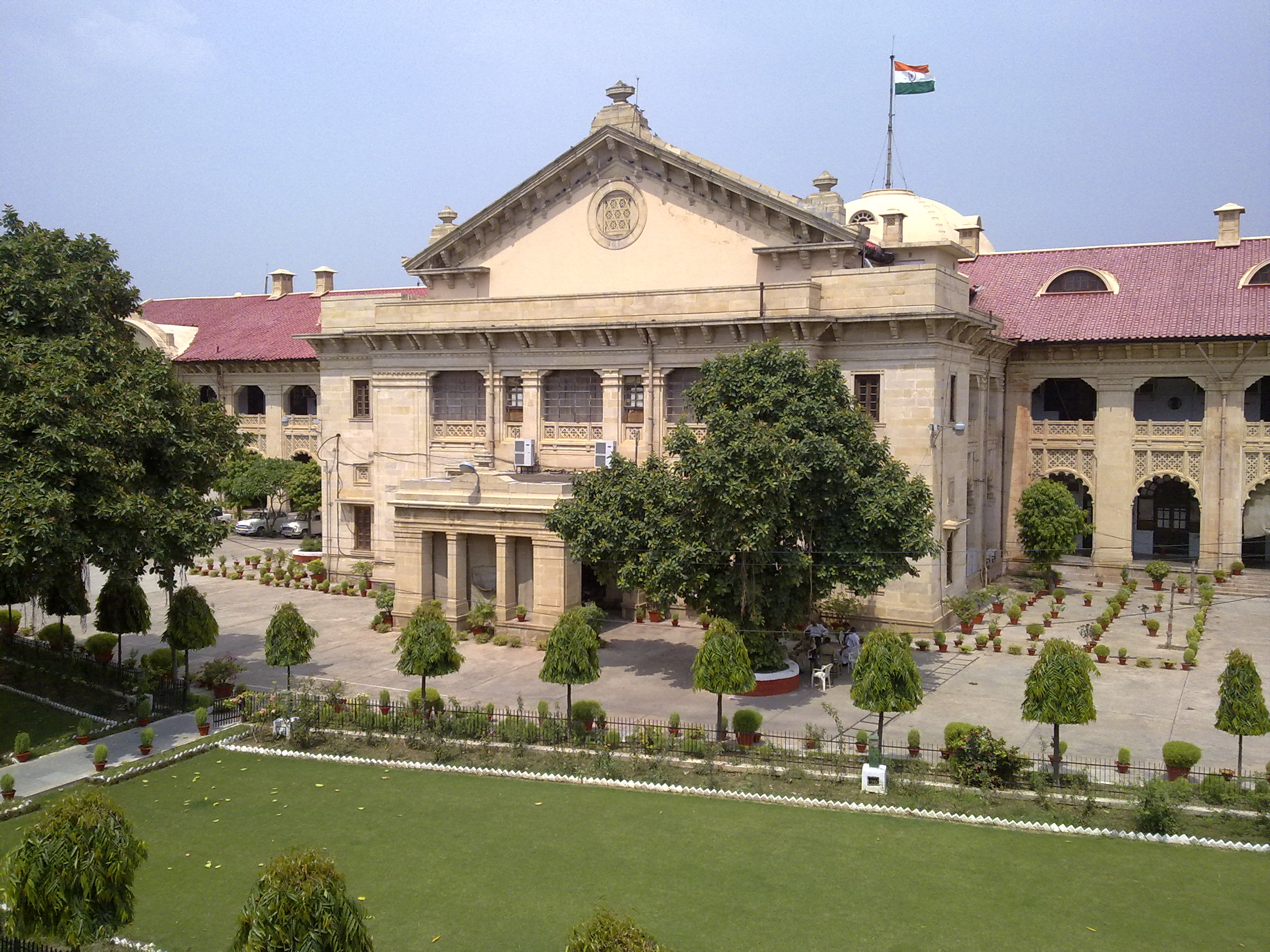
The Allahabad High Court building in Allahabad

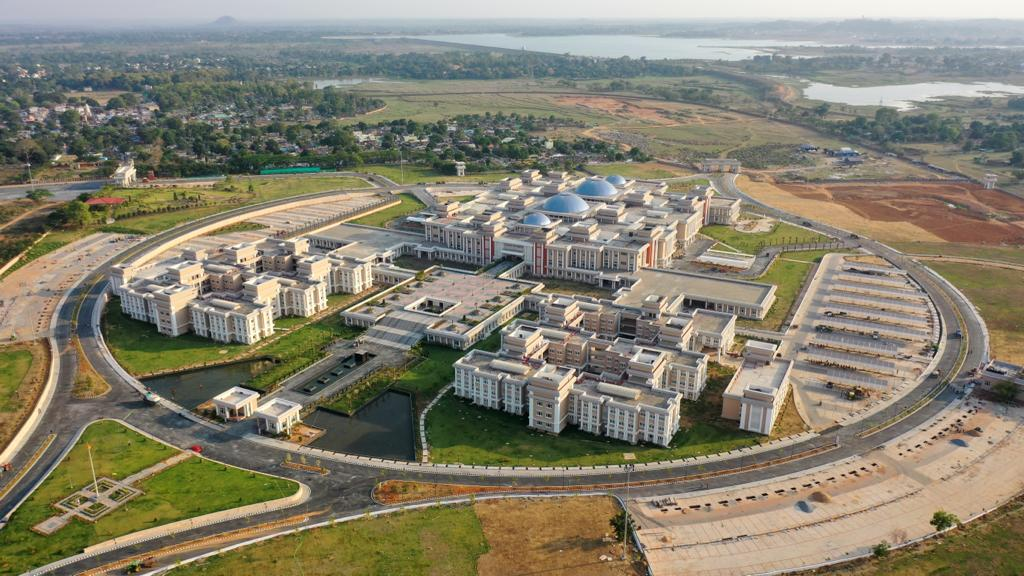
Aerial view of the new Jharkhand High Court building, the largest in India in terms of area

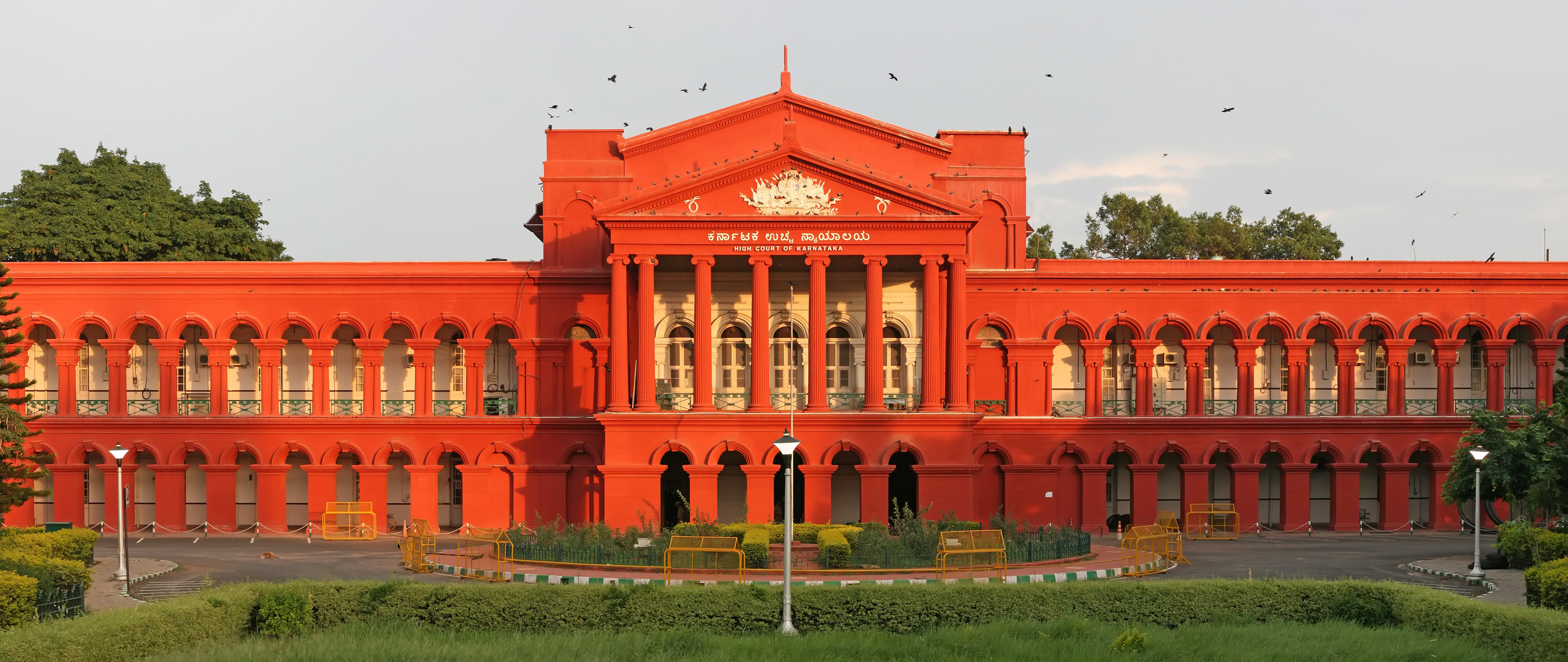
The Karnataka High Court building in Bengaluru

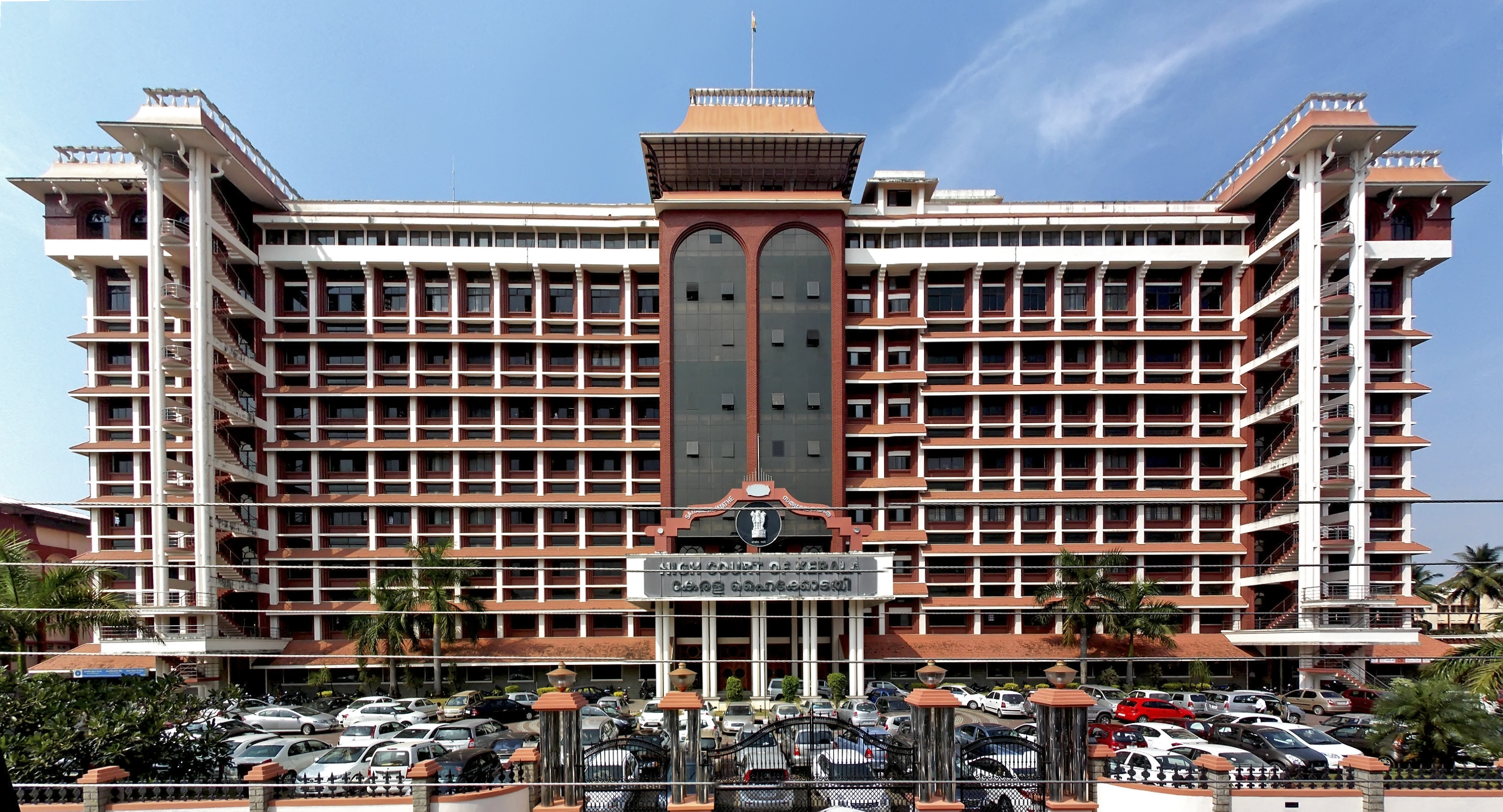
A working day view of the Kerala High Court building in Kochi

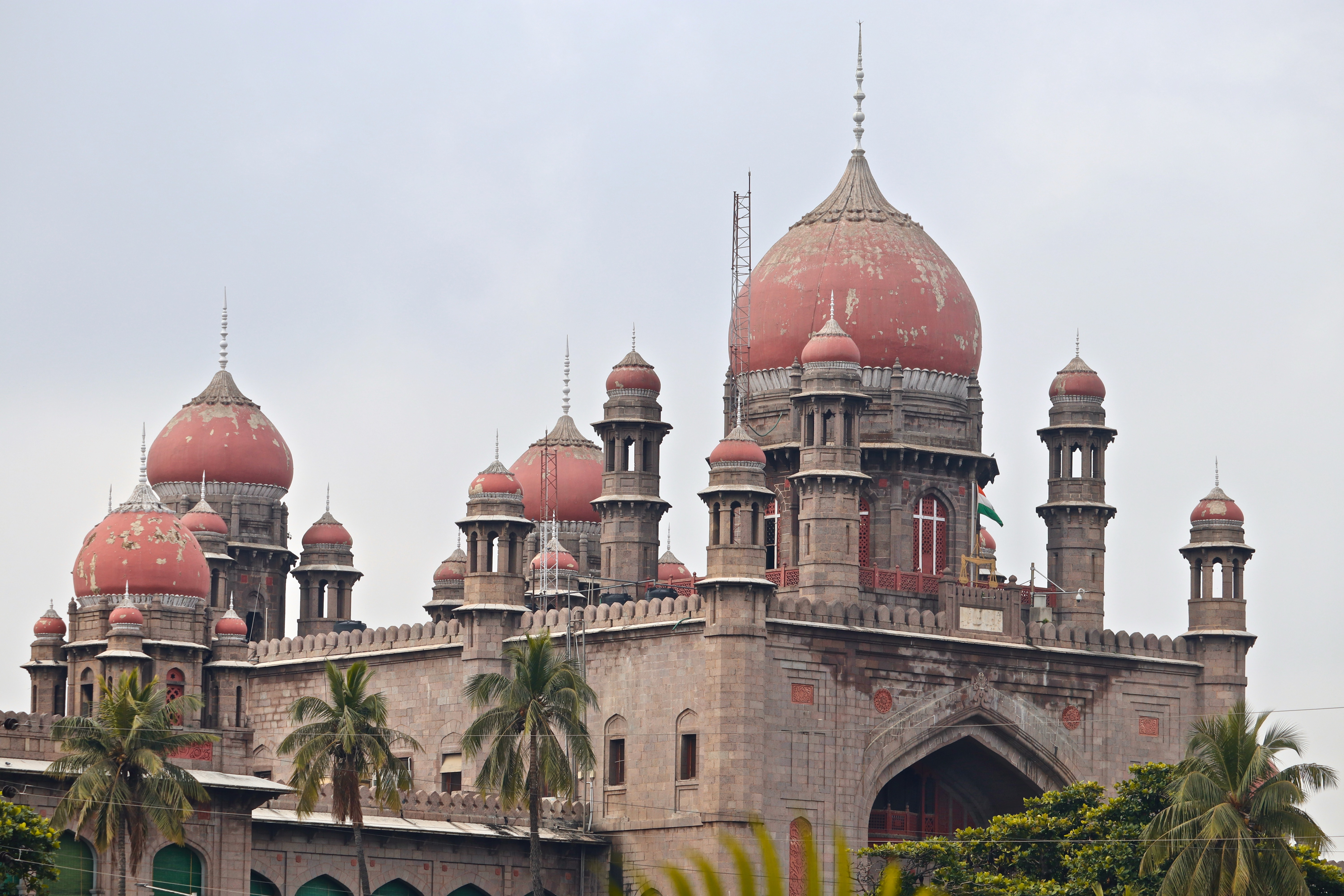
The Telangana High Court in Hyderabad is housed in a building built in 1919, making one of the oldest high court buildings.

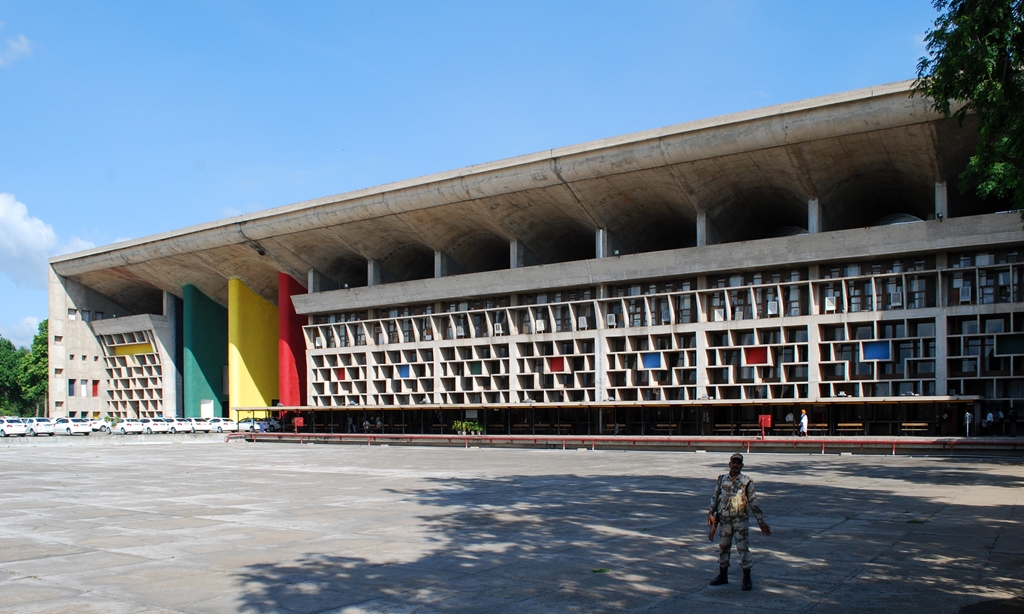
The Punjab and Haryana High Court building is part of the Chandigarh Capitol Complex, a UNESCO World Heritage Site

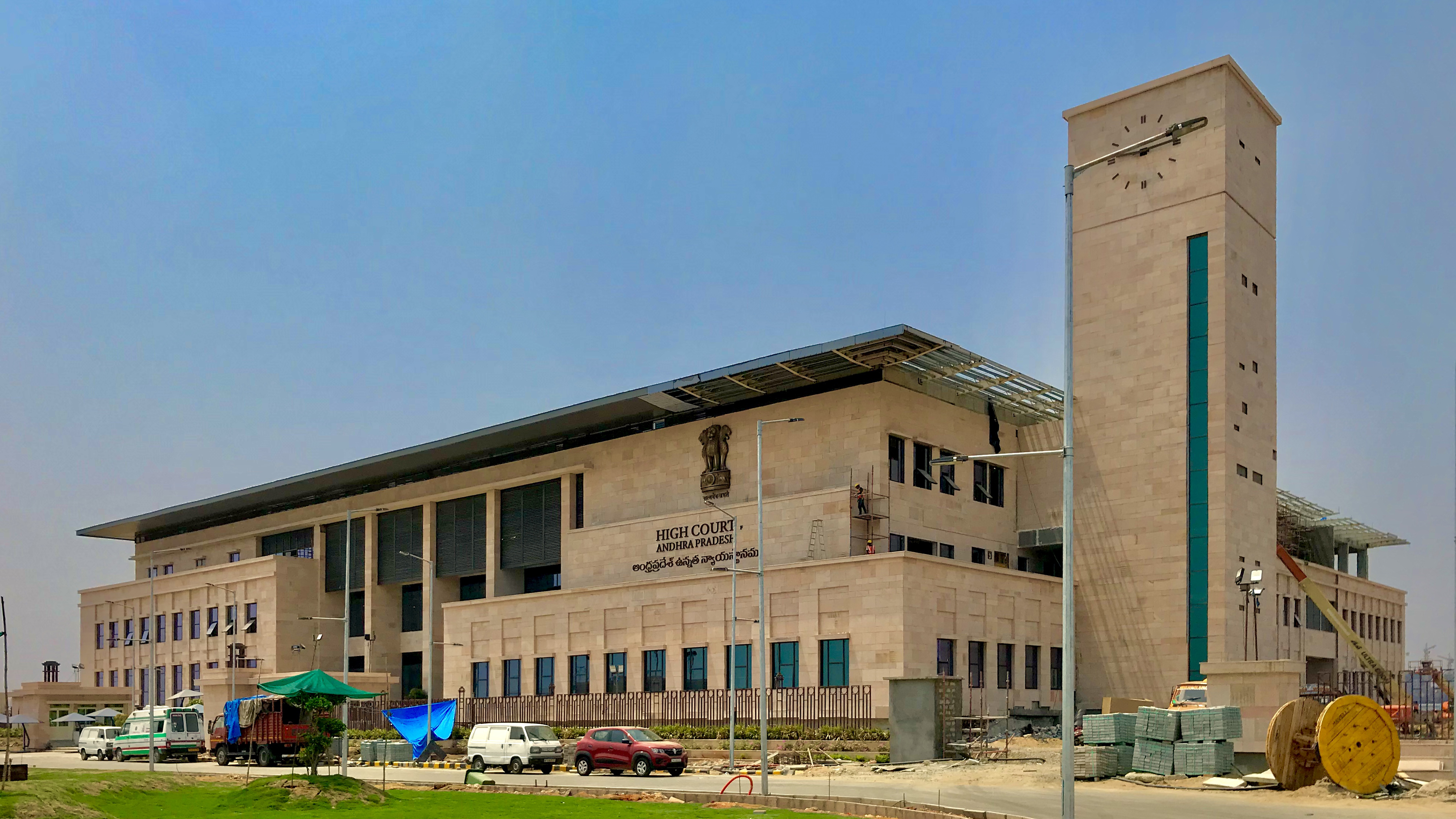
New High Court Building of Andhra at Amaravati

| State/UT | Court | Principal seat | Bench(es) |
|---|---|---|---|
| Andaman and Nicobar Islands | Calcutta High Court | — | Port Blair (Note: Circuit bench.) |
| Arunachal Pradesh | Gauhati High Court | — | Itanagar (Note: Permanent bench.) |
| Andhra Pradesh | Andhra Pradesh High Court | Amaravati | — |
| Assam | Gauhati High Court | Guwahati | — |
| Bihar | Patna High Court | Patna | — |
| Chandigarh | Punjab and Haryana High Court | Chandigarh | — |
| Chhattisgarh | Chhattisgarh High Court | Bilaspur | — |
| Dadra and Nagar Haveli and Daman and Diu | Bombay High Court | Mumbai | — |
| Delhi | Delhi High Court | New Delhi | — |
| Goa | Bombay High Court | — | Panaji |
| Gujarat | Gujarat High Court | Ahmedabad | — |
| Haryana | Punjab and Haryana High Court | Chandigarh | — |
| Himachal Pradesh | Himachal Pradesh High Court | Shimla | — |
| Jammu and Kashmir | High Court of Jammu & Kashmir and Ladakh | Srinagar/Jammu (Note: Srinagar is the summer capital; Jammu is the winter capital.) | — |
| Jharkhand | Jharkhand High Court | Ranchi | — |
| Karnataka | Karnataka High Court | Bengaluru | Dharwad and Kalaburagi |
| Kerala | Kerala High Court | Kochi | — |
| Ladakh | High Court of Jammu & Kashmir and Ladakh | — | Ladakh |
| Lakshadweep | Kerala High Court | Kochi | — |
| Madhya Pradesh | Madhya Pradesh High Court | Jabalpur | Gwalior and Indore |
| Maharashtra | Bombay High Court | Mumbai | Nagpur, Aurangabad and Kolhapur |
| Manipur | Manipur High Court | Imphal | — |
| Meghalaya | Meghalaya High Court | Shillong | — |
| Mizoram | Gauhati High Court | — | Aizawl |
| Nagaland | Gauhati High Court | — | Kohima |
| Odisha | Orissa High Court | Cuttack | — |
| Puducherry | Madras High Court | Chennai | — |
| Punjab | Punjab and Haryana High Court | Chandigarh | — |
| Rajasthan | Rajasthan High Court | Jodhpur | Jaipur |
| Sikkim | Sikkim High Court | Gangtok | — |
| Tamil Nadu | Madras High Court | Chennai | Madurai |
| Telangana | Telangana High Court | Hyderabad | — |
| Tripura | Tripura High Court | Agartala | — |
| Uttar Pradesh | Allahabad High Court | Allahabad | Lucknow |
| Uttarakhand | Uttarakhand High Court | Nainital | — |
| West Bengal | Calcutta High Court | Kolkata | Jalpaiguri |

== Courts under a high court ==
- District Court
- Munsiff Court
- Courts of Judicial Magistrate of First Class
- Court of Judicial Magistrate of Second Class
- E-courts

== See also ==
- List of current Indian chief justices
- List of sitting judges of the high courts of India
- Pendency of court cases in India
