= Ranjan Gogoi =

46th Chief Justice of India, Member of Rajya Sabha

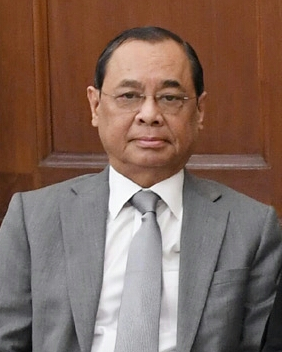
- Gogoi in November 2019

46th Chief Justice of India
- In office 3 October 2018 – 17 November 2019
- Appointed by: Ram Nath Kovind
- Preceded by: Dipak Misra
- Succeeded by: Sharad Arvind Bobde

Member of Parliament, Rajya Sabha
- In office 17 March 2020 – 16 March 2026
- Nominated by: Ram Nath Kovind
- Appointed by: M. Venkaiah Naidu
- Constituency: Nominated (Law)

Judge of the Supreme Court of India
- In office 23 April 2012 – 2 October 2018
- Nominated by: S. H. Kapadia
- Appointed by: Pratibha Patil

30th Chief Justice of the Punjab and Haryana High Court
- In office 12 February 2011 – 23 April 2012 (Note: Acting from 3 January to 12 February 2011)
- Nominated by: S. H. Kapadia
- Appointed by: Pratibha Patil
- Preceded by: Mukul Mudgal
- Succeeded by: A. K. Sikri

Judge of the Punjab and Haryana High Court
- In office 9 September 2010 – 11 February 2011
- Nominated by: S. H. Kapadia
- Appointed by: Pratibha Patil

Judge of the Gauhati High Court
- In office 28 February 2001 – 8 September 2010
- Nominated by: Adarsh Sein Anand
- Appointed by: K. R. Narayanan

Personal details
- Born: 18 November 1954 (age 71) Dibrugarh, Assam, India
- Spouse: Rupanjali Gogoi
- Children: 2
- Parents: Keshab Chandra Gogoi; Shanti Priya Gogoi
- Relatives: Jogesh Chandra Gohain (grandfather); Padma Kumari Gohain (grandmother); Anjan Gogoi (brother); Shrinjan Rajkumar Gohain (nephew/cousin)
- Education: St Stephen's College, (BA); Faculty of Law, University of Delhi, (LLB)
- Occupation: Jurist; advocate
- Awards: Assam Baibhav (2023)

Ranjan Gogoi (born 18 November 1954) is an Indian jurist and advocate who served as the 46th Chief Justice of India from 2018 to 2019 and as a Member of the Rajya Sabha from 2020 to 2026. He previously served as a judge of the Supreme Court of India from 2012 to 2018. Gogoi was a judge of the Gauhati High Court from 2001 to 2010, and of the Punjab and Haryana High Court from September 2010 to February 2011 where he later was the Chief Justice from 2011 to 2012.

Born and raised in Dibrugarh, Gogoi is from a political family and descends from the Ahom dynasty. His maternal grandparents were both state legislators; his grandmother, Padma Kumari Gohain, was one of the first female MLAs and one of the first female ministers in Assam. His father, Keshab Chandra Gogoi served as the Chief Minister of Assam for two months in 1982. Ranjan Gogoi is the only Chief Justice of India to have been the son of a Chief Minister. His mother, Shanti Priya Gogoi, was a prominent social activist who founded an NGO, SEWA, in 2000. One of five children, Gogoi's four siblings also rose to prominence in their respective careers, most notably his elder brother, Anjan, who served as an Air Marshal in the Indian Air Force. Gogoi studied at Cotton University and later completed his higher studies at the Faculty of Law, University of Delhi. He enrolled at the bar in 1978 and practised at the Gauhati High Court under advocate JP Bhattacharjee. Gogoi began to practise independently in 1991 and became a senior counsel in 1999 at the court, before being appointed a judge in 2001. He later transferred to the Punjab and Haryana High Court, where during his tenure he made orders which questioned the CBI’s promotion of SPS Rathore, despite the Ruchika Girhotra case, as well as numerous other judgements.

Gogoi was nominated to the Supreme Court in 2012 and was sworn in by S. H. Kapadia. He made various important judgements during his tenure including the updating of the National Register of Citizens for Assam, and the Soumya Murder case. He also served on the bench that created special courts to try MLAs and MPs, and ruled against the Uttar Pradesh Government law wherein former Chief Ministers were allowed to occupy government bungalows. Gogoi made further notable judgements in Orissa Mining Corporation v. Ministry of Environment & Forest & Others and on the income of Amitabh Bachchan. He imposed restrictions on the featuring of certain politicians in government advertisements, and made further judgements related to arbitration practices. Gogoi was appointed the Chief Justice of India (CJI) in 2018, the first holder of the office from Northeast India. As Chief Justice, he struck down rules under the Finance Act 2017, and also brought the office of CJI under the Right to Information Act. Gogoi also made landmark judgments in his final month in office, including the judgement on the Ayodhya dispute and the Rafale deal, before retiring in 2019. In 2020 he was nominated to the Rajya Sabha, and served on the committee on communications and information technology, and the committee on external affairs, before he retired in 2026.

A pivotal and instrumental figure in Indian judicial history, Gogoi's legacy is the subject of scholarly debate amongst sources. Some regard him as one of the greatest and most influential Chief Justices in Indian history; he has been accredited with delivery on landmark judgements, most prominently the 134-year-old Ayodhya dispute, and institutional reforms. Under Gogoi's recommendation, the Supreme Court composition increased from 31 to 34 judges, its highest ever level in history. His September 2019 reforms to reduce pendency led to single-judge Supreme Court benches being held the following year for the first time in seven decades. Conversely, his nomination to Parliament sparked national debate over judicial independence. As a Judge, he was known for his "no-nonsense" approach and advocacy for greater judicial transparency and reduction in case pendency. Gogoi is the third Supreme Court judge to serve in the Rajya Sabha, after Ranganath Misra and Baharul Islam, and the first to be nominated to his seat. He published his autobiography, Justice for the Judge, in 2021, and was awarded the Assam Baibhav, the state's highest civilian award, for 2023. The Indian Express named him as the country's third most powerful person of 2019, behind only Amit Shah and Narendra Modi.

== Early life and education ==
Ranjan Gogoi was born in a Tai-Ahom family with his family residence at the K.C. Gogoi Path in Dibrugarh on 18 November 1954. His mother's family ancestry can be traced back to Ahom Kings Swargadeo Rudra Singha, Rajeswar Singha of the Ahom kingdom. His father was Keshab Chandra Gogoi, an Indian National Congress politician who was the Chief Minister of Assam from 13 January 1982 to 19 March 1982. Keshab Chandra Gogoi also was an MLA from Dibrugarh, as well as being a cabinet minister multiple times over his political career. His mother was Shanti Gogoi, who was a social activist and writer. She founded the Socio Educational Welfare Association (SEWA), an NGO which aimed to help marginalised communities, and was its president from 2002 to 2016. She was an aunt of Shrinjan Rajkumar Gohain.

Both his maternal grandparents Jogesh Chandra Gohain and Padma Kumari Gohain were legislators and ministers in pre-and post-Independence India. His maternal grandfather, Jogesh Chandra Borgohain, served as a Member of the Assam Legislative Council in the 1930s. His maternal grandmother, Padma Kumari Gohain, was elected an MLA from Moran for three terms and was the social welfare minister in the Bimala Prasad Chaliha cabinet and social welfare and sericulture minister in the Mahendra Mohan Choudhry cabinet.

Gogoi was the second child and second son among five children. Each of his four siblings became proficient in their respective careers. His elder brother, Anjan, became an Air Marshal in the Indian Air Force until his retirement in 2013 and later became a member of the North Eastern Council. His younger brother, Nirjan, became a consultant urologist in the United Kingdom and his two younger sisters, Indira and Nandita, were members of the Assam civil service until their retirement. His elder brother, Anjan, served as the President of SEWA after their mother's retirement in 2016. His younger sister, Nandita, is the current President of SEWA.

During Gogoi's childhood in Dibrugarh with his brother Anjan, his father Keshab Chandra Gogoi said only one of them could go to the Sainik School in Goalpara. As both Ranjan and Anjan wanted to go, and with neither relenting, Keshab Chandra Gogoi told them to decide via a coin toss. Anjan won the coin toss, and went to the Sainik School in 1964, then to the National Defence Academy which eventually culminated in his career in the Indian Air Force.

Gogoi studied at Don Bosco Higher Secondary School, Dibrugarh, which was only a 20-minute walk away from his home. He then attended the Cotton College (currently known as Cotton University) in Guwahati before moving to Delhi to complete his higher studies. He then studied at St. Stephen's College, Delhi, graduating with honours in history. After completing his bachelor's degree, Gogoi cracked the Civil Services Examination to fulfil his father's wish. However, he was not chosen for the service he wanted, which led to his pursuit of law instead. Later on, he told his father his interest lay in pursuing law. He graduated from the Faculty of Law, University of Delhi where he received a law degree.

In 1982, the future Law Minister Abdul Muhib Mazumder asked Keshab Chandra Gogoi if his son would also become the Chief Minister of Assam someday. Keshab Chandra Gogoi said his son Ranjan Gogoi would not emulate him, but had the potential to become the Chief Justice of India. His father's assessment proved prophetic. His elder brother Anjan Gogoi confirmed this anecdote in an interview with the Times of India.

== Early career and high court (1978–2012) ==
=== Gauhati High Court ===
Gogoi enrolled at the bar in 1978, and practised at the Gauhati High Court under senior advocate JP Bhattacharjee. His autobiography, Justice for the Judge, said this was due to his father, Keshab Chandra Gogoi, asking for the most esteemed lawyer in Gauhati to take Ranjan Gogoi as a junior. In 1991, he began to practise independently on constitutional, taxation, services and company matters, after Bhattacharjee moved to Kolkata. Gogoi became extremely well known due to his contribution in making Tezpur Mental Hospital an actual research institution. He again rose to prominence after representing then Chief Minister Prafulla Kumar Mahanta in an investigation by the CBI into a letter-of-credit scandal. In 1999, he became a senior counsel at the High Court. He was made a permanent judge of the Gauhati High Court on 28 February 2001. During his tenure at the Gauhati High Court, he decided to combine similar cases at the court and hear them together. Around 10,000 cases of the education department of Assam were resolved in this way. The Supreme Court Collegium undertook a policy where a senior High Court judge, who is due to become the chief justice of another High Court, should be transferred to the High Court before the retirement of the incumbent chief justice. Following this policy, Gogoi was transferred to the Punjab and Haryana High Court on 9 September 2010.

=== Punjab and Haryana High Court ===
Gogoi became the acting Chief Justice of the Punjab and Haryana High Court on 3 January 2011, after the retirement of Mukul Mudgal. He was sworn in as the Chief Justice on 12 February 2011 by Governor Jagannath Pahadia at Raj Bhavan, Haryana. Several dignitaries were present at the ceremony, including Bhupinder Singh Hooda, Shivraj Patil and Parkash Singh Badal.

During his tenure at the Punjab and Haryana High Court, he made several judgements. In November 2010, a division bench of Gogoi and then Chief Justice Mukul Mudgal questioned the CBI on the promotion of SPS Rathore, despite the pending Ruchika Girhotra case against him. In 2011, Gogoi was on a division bench which was to hear a PIL into the case, but the case was later referred to another bench. On 27 January 2011, while acting chief justice, Gogoi was part of a division bench that ordered all private schools to keep 15% of their places vacant for the economically weaker sections in society, until 24 February 2011 (when the case was heard again). On 14 March 2011, Gogoi was part of a division bench that directed that the Camelot project was in the catchment area of the Sukhna Lake. On 22 April 2011, Gogoi was part of a bench that ordered that women are allowed to claim maternity leave benefits for the birth of their third child, while allowing a petition from a multipurpose health worker in Haryana. On 22 March 2012, Gogoi was on a division bench that ordered that the schedule of the user fees of the Pinjore-Parwanoo bypass be published in an official gazette and notified in the newspapers. On the 5 April, the bench ordered authorities to open the bypass by 6 April, which put an end to the delay in its opening.

== Judge of the supreme court (2012–2018) ==
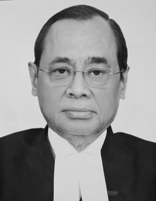
Official portrait, 2012

=== Tenure ===
On 23 April 2012, he was elevated as a judge of the Supreme Court. He was sworn in as a justice of the Supreme Court of India by Chief Justice S. H. Kapadia. Many dignitaries were present, as well as Gogoi's mother, Shanti Priya Gogoi, and elder brother Anjan.

In October 2014, Gogoi praised Prime Minister Narendra Modi on the Swachh Bharat Abhiyan campaign. He spoke on the matter while addressing an event for the fourth foundation day of the National Green Tribunal.

In October 2017, the Supreme court Collegium which consisted of Gogoi, with Chief Justice Dipak Misra, judges Jasti Chelameswar, Madan Lokur and Kurian Joseph, decided to make all of its decisions involving judicial appointments public. The collegium decided that the decisions were to be uploaded on the supreme court website in order to have transparency.

In his six-year tenure as a judge on the Supreme Court, Gogoi delivered more than 603 judgements. At least 25 judgements were constitution bench judgements which were heard by 5 or more judges.

=== Selected judgements and orders ===
==== Niyamgiri Hills case ====
In April 2013, Gogoi was a part of the bench that delivered the landmark judgement in the Niyamgiri Hills case which directed that the Gram Sabhas must give consent for the Vedanta Group to conduct its proposed bauxite mining project in the Niyamgiri Hills of Orissa. Following the ruling in the same year, 12 Gram Sabhas voted against the proposed mining.

In May 2016, a bench headed by Gogoi dismissed review petitions filed by the Orissa Mining Corporation which called for a second round of voting from the Gram Sabhas.

==== Euthanasia ====
In February 2014, a bench consisting of Chief Justice P. Sathasivam, Shiva Kirti Singh, and Gogoi, referred the issue of the legalisation of euthanasia to a larger five-judge constitution bench, arguing that there had been "inconsistent" opinions in previous verdicts. The bench cited the importance of having a clear enunciation of the law as reasoning for the referral, and passed the order on a petition seeking to declare the ability to die with dignity a fundamental right for terminally ill patients.

==== Politicians' photos in government ads ====
On 13 May 2015, a bench led by Gogoi, and with justice Pinaki Chandra Ghose, banned the featuring of politicians in government advertisements. The ruling only made exceptions for the President, Prime Minister, Chief Justice and late political figures such as Mahatma Gandhi. Gogoi said such photos have the possibility to create a "personality cult" which was the "direct antithesis of democratic functioning."

On 13 July 2015, a bench of Gogoi and N. V. Ramana refused to hear a plea made by Ajay Maken, accusing the Delhi government of disregarding the May ruling.

On 18 May 2016, a bench consisting of Gogoi and Pinaki Chandra Ghose modified the May judgement in 2015, allowing photos of Chief Ministers, Union Ministers, Governors and state ministers in government advertisements.

==== Income of Amitabh Bachchan ====
In May 2016, a bench consisting of Gogoi and Prafulla C. Pant quashed a 2012 Bombay High Court order that had dismissed the Commissioner of Income Tax's power to re-assess the income of Bollywood actor Amitabh Bachchan he allegedly obtained from the popular TV show Kaun Banega Crorepati.

In October 2002, Bachchan filed returns showing income of Rs 14.99 crore for the tax assessment year 2002–03. On 31 March 2003, he filed revised returns, declaring total income for that year in which he claimed expenses at 30% ad hoc amounting to Rs 6.31 crore, showing his income at Rs 8.11 crore. In March 2005, the Income Tax Department determined his income at Rs 56.41 crore for the year.

==== Special courts for politicians ====
On 1 November 2017, a bench consisting of Gogoi and Navin Sinha asked the government to create special courts for MLAs and MPs, giving the government six weeks for the scheme and its costs to be planned.

On 14 December 2017, the bench of Gogoi and Sinha ordered for 12 special courts to be created by 1 March 2018.

On 4 December 2018, a bench led by Gogoi, consisting of Sanjay Kishan Kaul and K. M. Joseph ordered the creation of the special courts in each district of Kerala and Bihar by 14 December.

==== SIT probe petition dismissal ====
Led by Gogoi, on 24 January 2018 the Supreme Court dismissed Advocate Kamini Jaiswal's petition seeking a Special Investigation Team (SIT) investigation into the attacks on Kanhaiya Kumar, the Jawaharlal Nehru University student union leader, on 15 and 17 February 2016 at Patiala House Court when he was being escorted to the court in a sedition case.

==== Arbitration ====
In March 2018, a judicial bench consisting of Gogoi and R. Banumathi observed the widespread absence of arbitration agreements, thus he introduced new laws, wherein the court can refer parties to arbitration only with the written consent of the parties. This could only be by a joint memorandum or application, not oral consent given by a counsel.

==== Former Chief Ministers' bungalows ====
In May 2018, a bench headed by Gogoi along with justice R. Banumathi, quashed an Uttar Pradesh law which allowed former Chief Ministers to occupy government bungalows. Gogoi said that once a Chief Minister leaves office, they were "at par" with the "common man" and allowing them to occupy government bungalows would not be guided by the "constitutional principle of equality". The bench described the amendment made by the Uttar Pradesh legislative assembly as unlawful, and said that such laws "create a class" and that once you leave office, you were "not entitled to have "any special privilege".

Following the ruling, six former Uttar Pradesh Chief Ministers, Rajnath Singh, Akhilesh Yadav, Mulayam Singh Yadav, Kalyan Singh, Mayawati and N. D. Tiwari vacated their government residences.

==== Govindaswamy vs State of Kerala ====
23-year-old Soumya, an employee of a Kochi shopping mall, was assaulted by one Govindaswamy in an empty ladies' coach of the Ernakulam-Shoranur passenger train on 1 February 2011. She was allegedly pushed off from the slow-moving train, carried to a wooded area and subsequently raped. She succumbed to her injuries at the Government Medical College Hospital, Thrissur, on 6 February 2011. Govindaswamy was sentenced to death for murder by a trial court and the order was upheld by the Kerala High Court on 17 December 2013.

On 15 September 2016, the Apex Court Bench consisting of Gogoi, Pant and Uday Umesh Lalit set aside the death penalty and sentenced Govindaswamy to a maximum of life imprisonment for rape and other offences of causing bodily injuries.

However, to hold that the accused is liable under Section 302 IPC what is required is an intention to cause death or knowledge that the act of the accused is likely to cause death. The intention of the accused in keeping the deceased in a supine position, according to P.W. 64, was for the purposes of the sexual assault. The requisite knowledge that in the circumstances such an act may cause death, also, cannot be attributed to the accused, inasmuch as, the evidence of P.W. 64 itself is to the effect that such knowledge and information is, in fact, parted with in the course of training of medical and para-medical staff. The fact that the deceased survived for a couple of days after the incident and eventually died in Hospital would also clearly militate against any intention of the accused to cause death by the act of keeping the deceased in a supine position. Therefore, in the totality of the facts discussed above, the accused cannot be held liable for injury no.2. Similarly, in keeping the deceased in a supine position, intention to cause death or knowledge that such actions may cause death, cannot be attributed to the accused. We are, accordingly, of the view that the offence under Section 302 IPC cannot be held to be made out against the accused so as to make him liable therefor. Rather, we are of the view that the acts of assault, etc. attributable to the accused would more appropriately attract the offence under Section 325 IPC. We accordingly find the accused-appellant guilty of the said offence and sentence him to undergo rigorous imprisonment for seven years for commission of the same... ...While the conviction under Section 376 IPC, Section 394 read with Section 397 IPC and Section 447 IPC and the sentences imposed for commission of the said offences are maintained, the conviction under Section 302 IPC is set aside...

Following the judgement of setting aside the death sentence of the accused in the said Govindaswamy vs State Of Kerala case, Gogoi and his bench were severely criticized by members of the public, members of the media, political leaders including the Chief Minister of Kerala, Pinarayi Vijayan, the Law Minister of Kerala, A.K. Balan, Senior CPI(M) leader V. S. Achuthanandan, and jurists including the Supreme Court lawyers Kaleeswaram Raj and Supreme Court Justice (retd) Markandey Katju.

In a blog entry on 17 September, retired judge Markandey Katju described the Supreme Court's verdict as a "grave error" not expected of "judges who had been in the legal world for decades". He criticised the Bench for believing "hearsay evidence" that Soumya jumped off the train instead of being pushed out by Govindaswamy:

Even a student of law in a law college knows this elementary principle that hearsay evidence is inadmissible.

In response, the SC bench led by Gogoi decided to convert that blog by Justice Markandey Katju into a review petition and asked him to personally appear in the court to debate. On 11 November 2016, he appeared in the court and submitted his arguments. The Court then dictated the order rejecting the review petition and issued a contempt of court notice to him stating that "Prima facie, the statements made seem to be an attack on the Judges and not on the judgment". On 6 January 2017, the Supreme Court accepted Katju's apology and closed the contempt proceedings against him.

==== NRC of Assam ====
On 5 December 2017, while disposing of a Writ Petition (Civil) No. 1020 of 2017, Kamalakhya Dey Purkayastha & Others Versus Union of India & Others clubbed with similar other petitions seeking clarification as to the meaning of people who are originally inhabitants of the state of Assam, a term which appears in a schedule to the Citizenship (Registration Of Citizens And Issue Of National Identity Cards) Rules, 2003 pertaining to special provision as to manner of preparation of National Register of Indian Citizen in state of Assam, the bench consisting of Justices Ranjan Gogoi and Rohinton Fali Nariman observed that

The exercise of upgradation of NRC is not intended to be one of identification and determination of who are original inhabitants of the State of Assam..... Citizens who are originally inhabitants/residents of the State of Assam and those who are not are at par for inclusion in the NRC.

The National Register of Indian Citizens or in short the NRC, at its root, comprises all the Local Registers of Indian Citizens containing details of Indian citizens usually residing in a village or rural area or town or ward or demarcated area (demarcated by the Registrar General of Citizen Registration) within a ward in a town or urban area.

The Citizenship (Registration of Citizens and Issue of National Identity Card) Rules, 2003 were amended in November 2009 and March 2010 for preparation of National Register of Citizens by inviting applications from all the residents in Assam for updation of the old National Register of Citizens (NRC) 1951 in Assam based on relevant records. In order to undertake updating of NRC in all districts of Assam, pilot projects for updating of NRC in two blocks (one each in Kamrup and Barpeta districts) were started in June 2010. Subsequently, these pilot projects were stopped due to law and order problems. A second attempt to update the register for Assam was made by the Government of India through issuing a Gazette Notification in December 2013.

On 17 December 2014, the bench consisting of Justices Ranjan Gogoi and Rohinton Fali Nariman mandated the Government of India to complete the finalization of final updated NRC for the entire state of Assam by 1 January 2016.

==== LGBT issues ====
In January 2014, a bench of Chief Justice P. Sathasivam and Gogoi expressed their displeasure over comments made by numerous Union Ministers for their comments over the court refusing to decriminalise homosexuality.

In February 2019, a bench consisting of Gogoi and Sanjiv Khanna allowed NGO, Naz Foundation Trust, to withdraw its curative plea against the Suresh Kumar Koushal v. Naz Foundation verdict, as the bench considered that the plea was infructuous of the Navtej Singh Johar v. Union of India case which decriminalised homosexuality.

==== Abortion pleas ====
In August 2014, a bench headed by Gogoi agreed to hear arguments on a plea which challenged the 1971 Medical Termination of Pregnancy (MTP) Act, and asked for the limit on abortions to be extended from 20 weeks to 28 weeks, due to technological advancements. The bench described it as a "serious issue" and said "we will inspect the law", and asked the government to respond if any fundamental right was being violated because of the act.

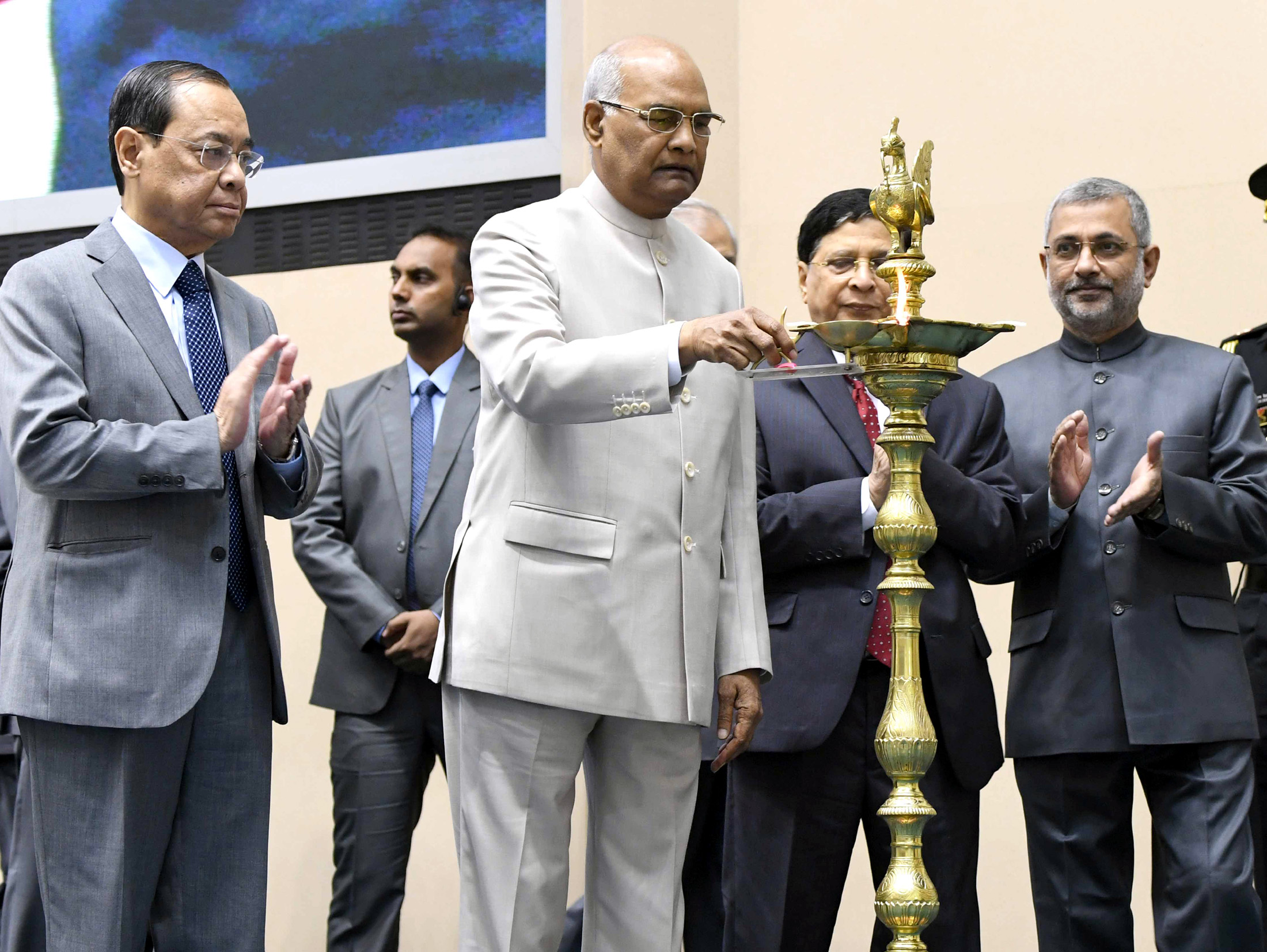
Gogoi, during his tenure as a Supreme Court justice, with President Ram Nath Kovind, Chief Justice Dipak Misra and Justice Kurian Joseph inaugurating the National Conference in New Delhi on 1 September 2018.

=== 2018 Supreme Court crisis ===
On 12 January 2018, Ranjan Gogoi and three other Supreme Court judges – Jasti Chelameswar, Madan Lokur and Kurian Joseph – became the first to hold a press conference. They alleged problems plaguing the court, in terms of failure in the justice delivery system and allocation of cases and told journalists the press conference was prompted by the issue of allocating to Justice Arun Mishra the case of the death of special Central Bureau of Investigation Judge B.H. Loya. Loya was a special CBI judge who had died in December 2014. Justice Loya was hearing the Sohrabuddin Sheikh case of 2004, in which police officers and BJP chief Amit Shah were named. Later, Mishra recused himself from the case. Chelameswar retired on 30 June 2018, which made Gogoi the second senior-most judge of the Supreme Court, followed by Lokur and Joseph. Notwithstanding his seniority ranking, then-Chief Justice Dipak Misra, recommended Gogoi as his successor.

== Chief Justice of India (2018–2019) ==
=== Appointment and oath ===
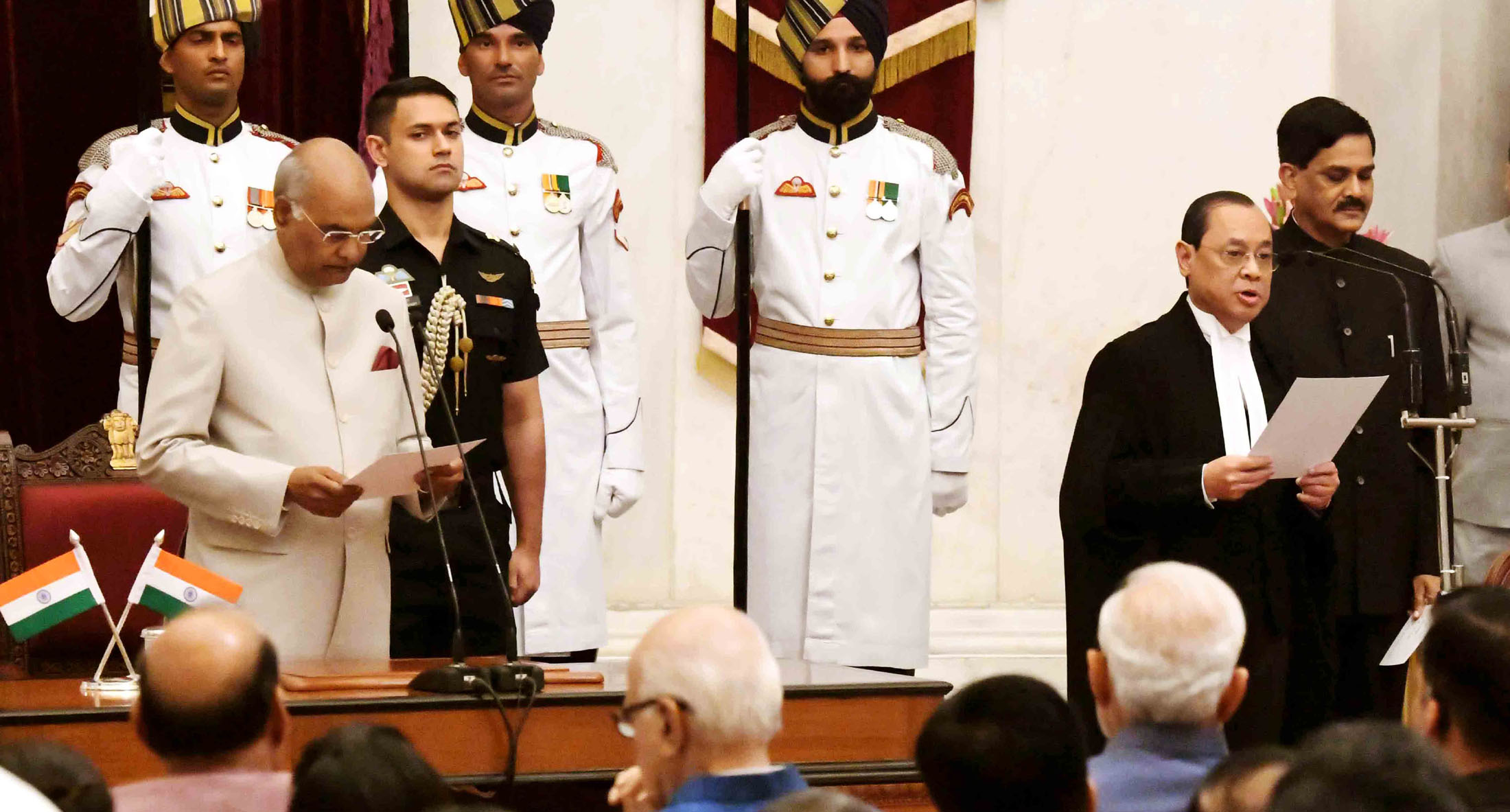
President Ram Nath Kovind administering the oath of office to Justice Ranjan Gogoi, as Chief Justice of India, at a swearing-in ceremony, at Rashtrapati Bhavan, in New Delhi on 3 October 2018

On 13 September 2018, following the recommendation of Misra on 4 September, President Ram Nath Kovind appointed Gogoi the next Chief Justice of India.

On 25 September 2018, a bench of Chief Justice Misra, A. M. Khanwilkar, and Dhananjaya Y. Chandrachud asked an advocate to file a mention memo against the appointment of Gogoi as Chief Justice of India, after he commented on the matter to the court. On 26 September, the bench dismissed the plea from the two advocates.

On 3 October 2018, he was sworn in as the Chief Justice of India, succeeding Dipak Misra. He was administered the oath by President Ram Nath Kovind at the Durbar Hall in Rashtrapati Bhavan. Many dignitaries were present at the event, including Narendra Modi, Rajnath Singh, Arun Jaitley, Mallikarjun Kharge, Sumitra Mahajan, Sudip Bandyopadhyay, Derek O’Brien, Manmohan Singh, H. D. Deve Gowda, L. K. Advani, Sushma Swaraj and many other prominent political figures. Gogoi's mother, Shanti Priya Gogoi, also attended the ceremony.

=== Tenure ===
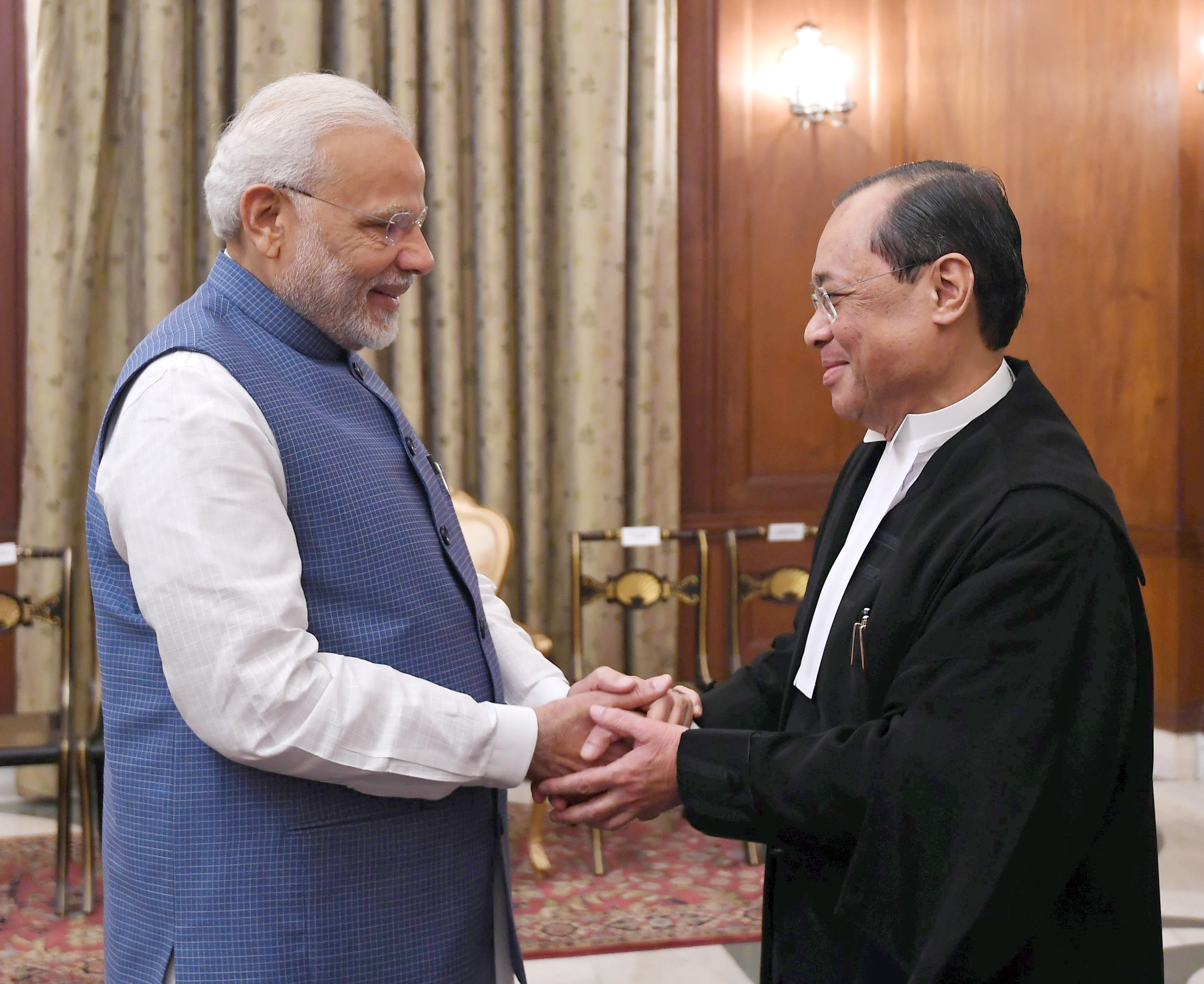
Gogoi being greeted by Prime Minister Narendra Modi after his swearing-in ceremony at Rashtrapati Bhavan in New Delhi on 3 October 2018

As Chief Justice, Gogoi attended numerous events including the Second swearing-in ceremony of Narendra Modi, and the swearing in of the first Lokpal Pinaki Chandra Ghose.

In November 2018, Gogoi created the Centre for Research and Planning (CRP) which he described as an "in-house think tank." In a press release, Gogoi stated that the CRP was established to "strengthen the knowledge infrastructure of the Supreme Court."

On 18 June 2019, Gogoi met with the Chief Justice of the Russian Federation Vyacheslav Mikhailovich Lebedev, to discuss judicial cooperation between the two countries.

On 22 June 2019, Gogoi wrote three letters to Prime Minister Narendra Modi, requesting an increase in the number of judges in the Supreme Court and requesting for the increase in the retirement age of High Court judges from 62 to 65. The suggestions were prompted by the 58,669 cases pending in the Supreme Court at the time. In two of the letters Gogoi wrote, he requested for constitutional amendments for the increase in the number of Supreme Court Judges, and the increase in retirement age for High Court judges. He wrote that the increase in retirement age would decrease the pendency of cases. The letters stated that there were many cases that had been pending for many years, including 26 cases that had been pending for 25 years. In a third letter, under articles 128 and 224A, Gogoi requested the revival of tenure appointments for retired High Court and Supreme Court judges, in order to assign them the cases that had been pending for years. On 31 July, the Union Cabinet approved the increase in the number of Supreme Court judges from 31 to 34 (including the Chief Justice). On 18 September, four new judges were appointed to the Supreme Court.

During his tenure as chief justice, he recommended 14 judges to the Supreme Court. The 14 judges he recommended were Hemant Gupta, Ramayyagari Subhash Reddy, Mukesh Shah, Ajay Rastogi, Dinesh Maheshwari, Sanjiv Khanna, Aniruddha Bose, A. S. Bopanna, Bhushan Ramkrishna Gavai, Surya Kant, Krishna Murari, Shripathi Ravindra Bhat, V. Ramasubramanian and Hrishikesh Roy.

In April 2019, Gogoi was accused of sexual harassment by a former Supreme Court employee who filed affidavits stating that he sexually harassed her on 10–11 October 2018 by pressing his body against hers against her will. Gogoi rejected the allegations and said that there were "bigger forces" trying to "destabilise the judiciary". A statement from the Supreme Court Secretary General on behalf of Gogoi said the accuser had "no occasion to interact directly" with Gogoi. A three-judge internal investigation, on a committee chaired by Sharad Bobde, cleared him of the charges a month later. The panel originally consisted of Bobde, Indira Banerjee and N. V. Ramana, but Ramana later recused himself and was replaced with Indu Malhotra. The panel found that there was "no substance" to the accusations. In February 2021, a Supreme Court inquiry, based on a report by Justice Ananga Kumar Patnaik, found that a conspiracy against Gogoi could not be ruled out; the inquiry ruled that such a conspiracy could have been related to Gogoi's decisions such as his views on the NRC and his attempts to streamline the Supreme Court registry.

=== Selected judgements ===
==== Rafale deal ====
On 14 December 2018, a bench of Gogoi and with justices Sanjay Kishan Kaul and K. M. Joseph, reserved the verdict on the Rafale deal and dismissed all petitions seeking a probe into it.

On 14 November 2019, a bench consisting of Gogoi, Sanjay Kishan Kaul and K. M. Joseph, dismissed petitions seeking a review of the verdict in December 2018.

==== LGBT rights petitions ====
In April 2019, a bench headed by Gogoi and consisting of Deepak Gupta, and Sanjiv Khanna, dismissed a review petition seeking further LGBT civil rights such as same-sex marriage, adoption and surrogacy for the LGBT community, arguing that it was "not inclined" to entertain the review petition since there was a decision by the case of Navtej Singh Johar v. Union of India.

==== Abortion PIL ====
In July 2019, a bench consisting of Gogoi and Deepak Gupta agreed to hear a PIL from three women who sought to decriminalise abortion to allow for choice in reproductive rights. The bench issued a notice to the government in which it sought their response on certain sections of the (MTP) act being unconstitutional and void due to the violation of fundamental rights.

==== Jammu and Kashmir lockdown ====
During the 2019–2021 Jammu and Kashmir lockdown, Mehbooba Mufti's daughter Iltija Mufti asked the Supreme Court for permission to meet her mother and travel freely. Gogoi, then Chief Justice of India, asked, "why do you want to move around? It is very cold in Srinagar."

==== Ayodhya dispute ====
On 9 November 2019, Ranjan Gogoi and four other Supreme Court judges (Justices Sharad Arvind Bobde, Dhananjaya Y. Chandrachud, Ashok Bhushan and S. Abdul Nazeer) pronounced the verdict on the Ayodhya Ram Janambhoomi-Babri Masjid title dispute case. After 40 days of daily hearings from 6 August, the five-judge bench unanimously decided in favour of awarding the land to the Hindu side to build a Lord Rama temple.

==== CJI under RTI act ====
On 13 November 2019, a constitution bench led by Gogoi, along with Justices N. V. Ramana, Dhananjaya Y. Chandrachud, Sanjiv Khanna and Deepak Gupta, ruled that the office of Chief Justice of India fell under the Right to Information act. The bench argued that transparency did not undermine judicial independence.

==== Tribunals and Finance act ====
On 13 November 2019, a five-judge constitution bench led by Gogoi, with Justices N. V. Ramana, Dhananjaya Y. Chandrachud, Sanjiv Khanna and Deepak Gupta, struck down the rules under the Finance Act 2017 which related to the composition and functioning of judicial tribunals in its entirety. The bench also referred the passing of the Finance Act as a money bill to a larger bench. Gogoi wrote the majority opinion, and Chandrachud and Khanna wrote separate but concurring opinions. The bench also directed the Ministry of Law to carry out a judicial impact assessment of all tribunals, and in the majority opinion the bench argued that certain powers related to tribunals were not "intended to vest solely with the Legislature".

==== Entry of women to Sabarimala ====
On 14 November 2019, a bench led by Gogoi and consisting of Justices Dhananjaya Y. Chandrachud, A. M. Khanwilkar, Indu Malhotra, Rohinton Fali Nariman, ruled in a 3:2 majority verdict that review petitions challenging the 2018 Supreme Court verdict which allowed the entry of women of all ages to the Sabarimala temple should be referred to a larger seven-judge bench. Gogoi, Khanwilkar and Malhotra pronounced the majority view while Chandrachud and Nariman dissented. In the majority view, the court argued that the issue did not apply to just the entry to the Sabarimala but also to other places of worship in other religions and thus other issues could be looked at by a larger bench as well. The court also argued that there was another "seminal issue" pending for the court regarding the constitutional validity of a court deciding on whether particular practices of a religion were essential, referring to the issue of female genital mutilation in the community of Dawoodi Bohra.

=== Retirement ===
Though Gogoi officially retired on 17 November 2019, his last working day was the day before on 16 November. He wrote a three-page common letter to journalists, in which he declined requests for interviews but lauded the role of the media during the "trying times" of the judiciary. He was succeeded by Sharad Bobde, whose swearing-in ceremony he attended on 18 November.

== Member of the Rajya Sabha (2020–2026) ==
External videos
- "Former CJI Ranjan Gogoi takes oath as Rajya Sabha MP", YouTube, 19 March 2020

=== Nomination and oath ===
Gogoi was nominated to the Rajya Sabha by President Ram Nath Kovind on 16 March 2020. Gogoi's nomination triggered debate and criticism on the benefits for judges post their retirement. Before taking his oath, Gogoi defended his nomination, stating that he had a "strong conviction" that the "legislature and judiciary must work together" for "nation building", and argued that his "presence in the legislature" would provide an "opportunity to project the views of the judiciary before the legislature". The Bar Council of India praised Gogoi's nomination, stating that they saw it as a bridge between the "legislature and judiciary".

On 19 March 2020, he took the oath of office as a Member of Parliament in the Rajya Sabha in the presence of the Chairman of Rajya Sabha, Venkaiah Naidu, as well as Prime Minister Narendra Modi and Home Minister Amit Shah. He took his oath amidst a walkout from members of opposition parties who shouted "shame" chants and other slogans. Naidu criticised the chants, describing the conduct from those members as "unbecoming", and stated that it was "not the way" and "very unfair". Naidu also argued that members knew the powers of the president of India, the precedent and constitution, and said that members had the liberty to express their views outside and not in the House. Law Minister Ravi Shankar Prasad similarly criticised the walkout, describing it as "grossly unfair" and argued that Gogoi would "surely contribute his best as a nominated member". Following the incident, Gogoi remarked "they will welcome me very soon."

=== Tenure and retirement ===
In March 2020, Gogoi stated he did not intend to become a minister or join a political party. He was appointed to the Parliamentary Standing Committee on External Affairs on 23 July 2020. He resigned in September 2021, and instead became a member on the committee of communications and information technology. He resigned from the committee in May 2022, and on 5 May 2022 he again became a member on the Parliamentary Standing Committee on External Affairs. On 2 September 2020, following an RTI request filed by India Today, the Rajya Sabha Secretariat revealed Gogoi to be the only member of the Rajya Sabha who does not take allowances or a salary.

In an interview with Sreenivasan Jain for NDTV in December 2021, when asked about his attendance in the Rajya Sabha, Gogoi cited medical advice because of COVID-19 as why he did not attend sessions which he explained in letters. He then went on to say "I go to Rajya Sabha when I feel like, when I think there are matters of importance on which I should speak", and argued that since he was a nominated member, he was not governed by party whips to attend. Following his comments, privilege motions were moved against him by numerous Rajya Sabha opposition MPs. After the comments, Rajya Sabha Chairman Naidu, without referring to Gogoi specifically, said that every member was "duty bound" to attend the House unless they had "compelling reasons" not to. In response to the motions being moved against him, Gogoi said that the "law will take its course". The motion was not admitted by the Rajya Sabha secretariat and so did not proceed further.

On 7 August 2023, Gogoi made his 16 minute-long maiden speech in the Rajya Sabha in which he defended the proposed Delhi services bill. In his maiden speech, Gogoi focused on the legality of the proposed legislation, focusing on three viewpoints: the "sub-judice", the "overreaching of the Supreme Court" and the "constitutional validity". He argued in his speech that Parliament should have the ability to legislate on the issue. He later stated that in his respectful submission and contention, the bill was "perfectly legitimate" and "valid".

In March 2026, when questioned on his Rajya Sabha attendance by ThePrint, Gogoi said that he "didn't ask questions for the sake of asking questions" and "didn't participate for the sake of participation" because he was not "a professional politician who needs to make a mark for a rise in career politics." He went on to say that he had contributed in other areas such as "addressing foreign delegations, heads of mission, law enforcement agencies on varied topics" including the role of the "judiciary and legislature under the constitution". On 16 March, Gogoi retired and Vice President C. P. Radhakrishnan in a farewell message stated he brought "unparalleled legal acumen and experience" to Rajya Sabha deliberations and that the House would "certainly miss his wise counsel, measured intervention and gravitas".

== Personal life ==
=== Family and health ===
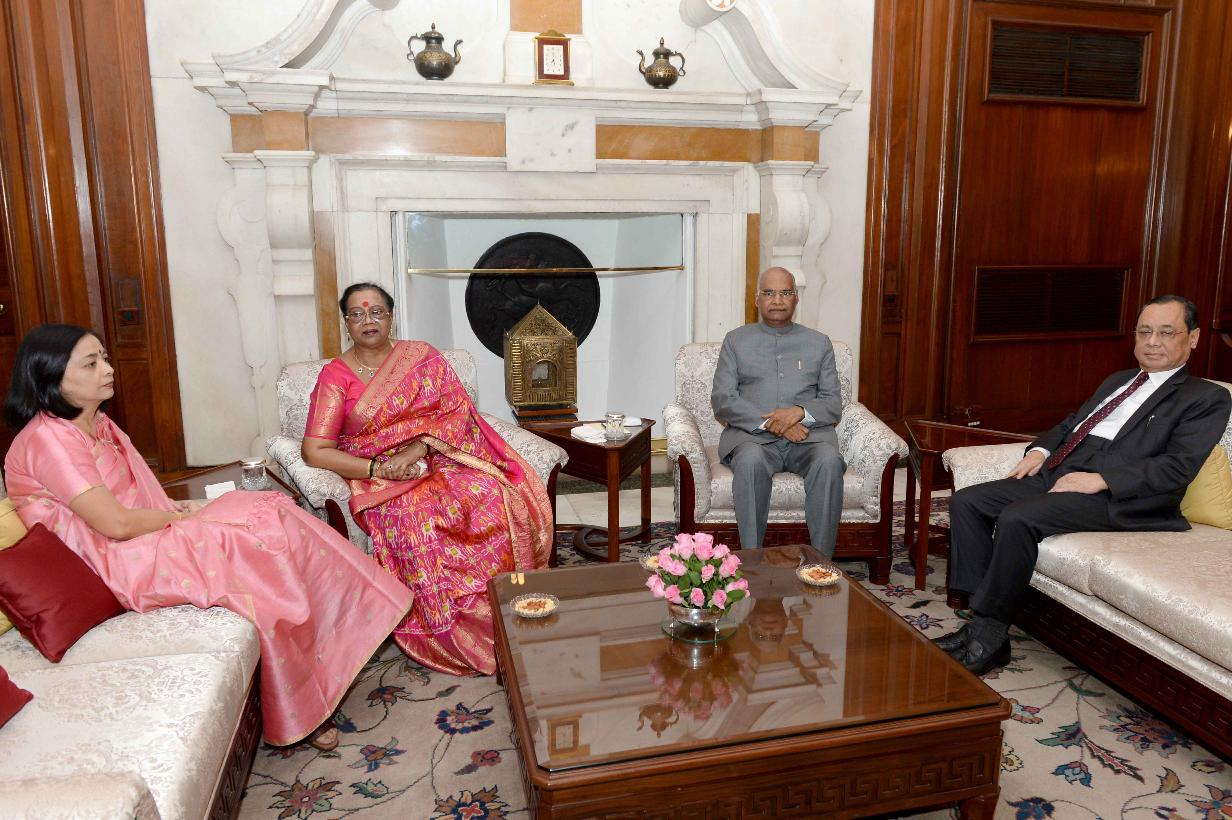
Gogoi with his wife Rupanjali (left), First Lady Savita Kovind (second from left) and President Ram Nath Kovind (second from right) on 1 November 2018.

Gogoi is married to Rupanjali Gogoi, and they have two children together, a son Raktim Gogoi and a daughter Rashmi Gogoi, both of whom are advocates. His daughter, Rashmi, is married to the son of former Delhi High Court justice Valmiki Mehta.

Gogoi suffered from pancreatitis in the 1980s. He again suffered from the same disease in April 2011, when he was the Chief Justice of the Punjab and Haryana High Court, and was admitted to the Post Graduate Institute of Medical Education and Research, and later was flown to the Ganga Ram Hospital in Delhi for treatment.

=== Interests and security ===
Gogoi has visited numerous countries, including Russia, to attend the Conference of Chief Justices; Turkey, to attend the Conference of Islamic Countries as well as Indonesia, the UK, France, Germany and the Netherlands.

Gogoi wrote an autobiography titled "Justice for the Judge: An Autobiography" in 2021. He is not on the social media platform Twitter, and several tweets were falsely attributed to Gogoi. He is one of the 63 individuals in India covered by Z plus security provided by the Central Reserve Police Force.

=== Finances ===
When Gogoi became the Chief Justice of India on 3 October 2018, he was one of the 11 Supreme court Justices who made their assets and finances public. He disclosed he had no car, and the only property he had was gifted to him by his mother in June 2015.

== Views ==
=== Judiciary ===
Gogoi has been appreciated highly by litigants and civilians for stating that the judiciary is ramshackled and it is useless going to court as many litigants have their cases being dragged on for years and do not find respite. Gogoi also stated, in an interview in June 2023, that judges in the Supreme Court can be corrupt.

=== One Nation, One Election ===
On 11 March 2025, Gogoi testified before the Joint Parliamentary Committee where he argued that the One Nation, One Election bill was constitutionally valid and would not infringe upon the rights of Indian voters. However, Gogoi criticised the possibility of the Election Commission (EC) having unrestricted powers to decide the schedule of the election, and he questioned Article 82A which granted the EC the power to decide if a state assembly should have a separate election from a Lok Sabha election.

== Honours and recognition ==
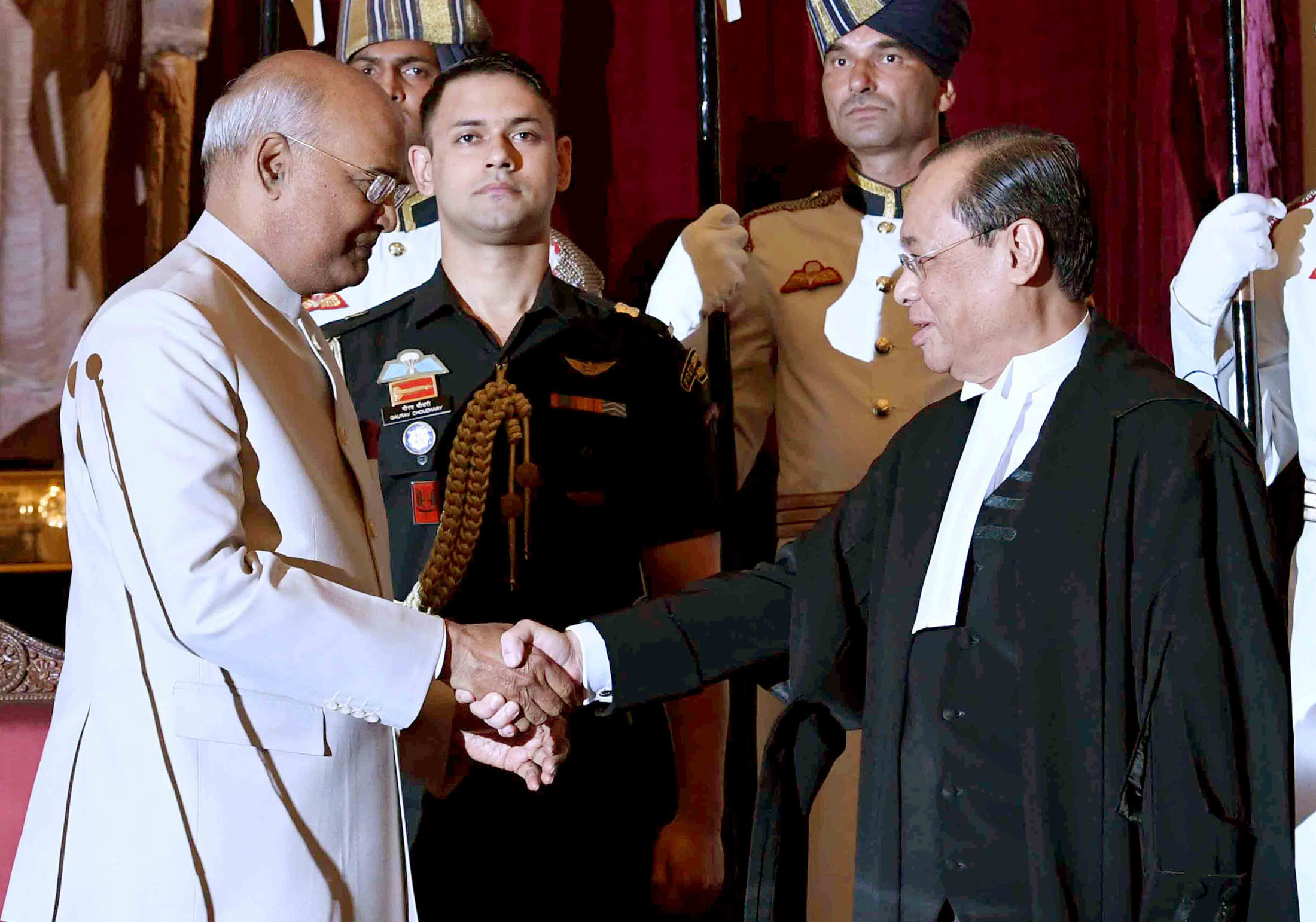
Gogoi being greeted by President Ram Nath Kovind after his swearing in at Rashtrapati Bhavan in New Delhi on 3 October 2018.

In 2018, The Indian Express listed him as the 45th most powerful Indian, citing his role in the 2018 Supreme Court of India crisis, his judgement on special courts for politicians and his upcoming accession to become the Chief Justice of India.

In 2019, The Indian Express listed Gogoi as the third most powerful person in India. He was placed behind only Home Minister Amit Shah and Prime Minister Narendra Modi in the list. It cited his role in the judgement on the NRC, in increasing judicial vacancies in high courts and the supreme court, and the Ayodhya dispute.

In May 2023, Punjab University honoured Gogoi with the honorary Doctor of Laws degree for his contributions to the legal field and society. Vice President and chancellor of the university Jagdeep Dhankhar presented the award to Gogoi at the university's 70th annual convocation on 20 May.

In January 2024, Chief Minister Himanta Biswa Sarma announced that Gogoi would be awarded the Assam Baibhav award, Assam's highest civilian award, in the field of law and justice for 2023. Sarma said the award recognised Gogoi for his "exceptional efforts to expand the delivery of justice and expand our jurisprudence", and said that Gogoi would "inspire all generations to come". On 13 February Gogoi was bestowed with the award by the Governor at Srimanta Sankaradeva Kalakshetra in the presence of Sarma and Vice President Jagdeep Dhankhar.

On 31 May 2024, Gogoi was awarded the UKILP Lifetime Achievement Award from the Supreme Court of the United Kingdom for his "exemplary achievements and leadership in the legal profession", recognising that his career had "significantly shaped the legal landscape in India". He was bestowed the honour at the House of Lords in the presence of several UK dignitaries including the President of the Bar Council of England and Wales and members of the House of Lords.

== Legacy ==
=== Reputation and reception ===
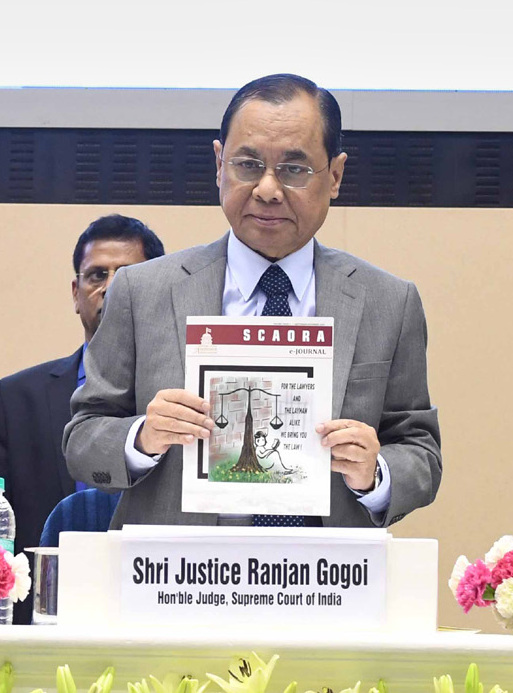
Gogoi in September 2018.

During the entirety of his judicial career, Gogoi garnered a reputation as a "no-nonsense" and "strict" judge. The Times of India cited his summoning of Markandey Katju for his remarks against the Supreme Court as evidence of his no-nonsense approach, while other researchers suggested his removal of Harsh Mander as an amicus curiae during the NRC Assam case as evidence of this, as well as of his imperiousness. The Hindu recorded that his colleagues at the Gauhati High Court regarded him as a "soft-spoken, reserved person who commanded respect". Gogoi was known for his strict observance of manners and decorum in Court and his disapproval of interference, as well as for keeping "institutional interests" above his own "personal stakes". Gogoi acknowledged his strict manner on his first day in office as Chief Justice of India, in response to the president of the bar association describing him as such, stating "Vikas Singh said I am a strict man. I am what I am. I can't change." In response to his sexual harassment allegations, which he was later cleared of, Gogoi said that reputation is the only thing which a judge had. He was also noted for being meticulous in his reading of files and documents, as well as in his balance of law, equity and social problems. The president of the Gauhati High Court Bar association described him as the "jewel of the northeast" and a "man of principles and a very honesty and upright man". After his inauguration as Chief Justice, Prime Minister Narendra Modi said that his "experience, wisdom, insight and legal knowledge" would benefit the country greatly.

Various media outlets and new sources noted his reputation as a "tough" Judge; India Today stated that he was known for this attribute and for being "steadfast" in his commitment to "protecting the sanctity of the Supreme Court" and for speaking his mind, while The Statesman described him as having a "tough personality" with "quick decision-making abilities". The Dibrugarh bar association, despite Gogoi never being a member of it, called him the "guardian of the bar". Numerous media outlets also described his "boldness" and "fearlessness". He was also praised for his integrity as a Judge, Vice President Jagdeep Dhankhar stated in 2024 that Gogoi exemplified the "highest standards of integrity, wisdom and commitment to justice". Following the verdict on the Ayodhya dispute he was similarly praised by numerous of his Supreme Court colleagues; his successor as Chief Justice of India, Sharad Bobde, described Gogoi's "grit, mettle and character" while former Supreme Court judge Arun Mishra declared that Gogoi achieved the "impossible" with the verdict and made his name "in history". The Economic Times called him "the man who settled India's longest running-dispute", and noted various former colleagues of his who said he was hardworking amongst numerous other attributes.

Before his tenure as Chief Justice of India, he was widely received as a rebel and revolutionary judge. His reputation as a rebel came largely from his role in the 2018 Supreme Court crisis. He famously stated in July 2018 that the Indian judiciary needed "revolution, not reform" as he expressed his concerns over the ineffiency and slow processes within the system. Several media outlets described him as a "rebel with a cause". He was reportedly a man of few words outside of court, but also with a reputation for "probity" and for "incisive remarks". He was also known for his "strong" convictions, and described as a "man of action".

=== Assessments of tenure ===
==== Institutional reforms ====
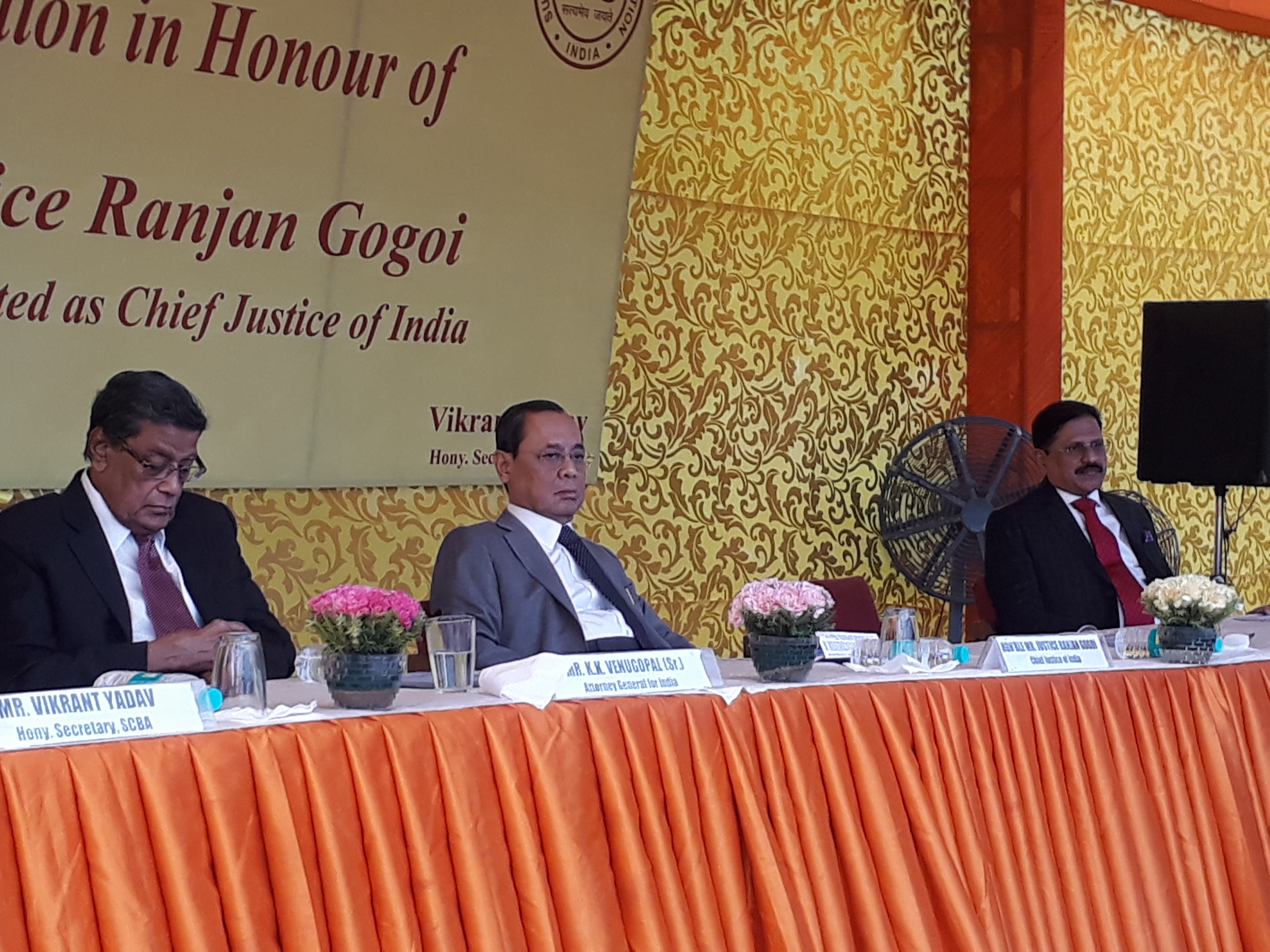
Gogoi (centre) at his felicitation ceremony upon becoming Chief Justice of India on 3 October 2018, with Attorney General K. K. Venugopal (left).

Under Gogoi's tenure as Chief Justice of India, various reforms to increase judicial efficiency and transparency were implemented. On his day in office, he cited the filling of judicial vacancies as a priority of his and began implementing numerous reforms. He banned the practice of urgent mentioning unless there was an extreme emergency until certain parameters were fixed, on his first day. Also on his first day, Gogoi reshuffled the Supreme Court roster under which the Chief Justice continued to hear Public Interest Litigations (PILs), habeas corpus writs, pleas for social justice and also petitions related to appointments to constitutional points. Under Gogoi's new roster, the second most senior Judge, who was then Madan Lokur, could also hear PILs but only those transferred by the Chief Justice. Gogoi again shuffled the roster of work following the Court's return from the summer break in June 2019, in which the Chief Justice handled all PIL matters and it would be his decision whether to assign PIL cases to the four most senior other judges, who were then Sharad Bobde, N. V. Ramana, Arun Kumar Mishra, and Rohinton Fali Nariman. Under the June 2019 roster, Gogoi allocated matters relating to criminal cases, arbitration, contempt of court, habeas corpus, and ordinary and civil matters.

His early tenure during his first month in office encompassed numerous procedural reforms to increase transparency and efficiency. He barred judges from taking Leave Travel Concession (LTC) during workdays unless there was an emergency. The Times of India described the reform as "radical" but argued that it would go "a long way in the delivery of justice" and was "laudable". Gogoi also asked Chief Justices of High Courts to notify him if these rules were not being followed, as well as expressing his displeasure at judges attending seminars or official functions during the working hours of courts. At the administrative level of the Supreme Court, Gogoi also ordered that every Wednesday and Thursday weekly the court would have at least five benches to hear criminal appeals waiting disposal and the first 10 of those would be where petitioners were imprisoned at the time. Other reforms made by Gogoi include the introduction of available copies of judgements to litigants in their own languages if they were not able to understand the verdicts in English. He also advocated for greater continuity in the judicial system at all levels, and consulted with his two successors, Bobde and Ramana, on the delivery of the system.

Gogoi was accredited for his efforts in trying to increase judicial efficiency, most prominently through his three requests to Modi in July 2019. His recommendations were the first time in a decade that the number of Judges of the Supreme Court had been increased, since it was raised from 26 to 31 in 2009. During his tenure, the number of Judges of the Supreme Court reached its highest in history. He also repeatedly directed High Courts to fill judicial vacancies, and in February 2019 he ordered the Registrar stop accepting fresh cases that were missing important documents.

Gogoi also attempted to introduce significant reforms that, while ultimately did not materialise under his tenure, influenced later judicial reform. This included his September 2019 changes to constitution benches aimed at reducing the pendency of cases. The reform for single benches amended the 2013 Supreme Court rules and allowed for a single sitting Judge to hear and dispose of certain categories of matters. However, the constitution bench reforms were implemented without amending the rules, as it created a permanent five judge constitution bench to hear and decide cases. Previously, the Chief Justice formed constitution benches on an ad-hoc basis by considering the question of law, the availability of judges and the overall pendency. Under Gogoi's reforms however the constitution bench was made permanent, which allowed for more time spent hearing on constitutional matters. If implemented, the reforms would have been the first structural reform of jurisdiction that distinguished constitutional matters from all of the other matters of the Court. His plans did not materialise with his term expiring a few months after the reforms were announced, though future Chief Justice Dhananjaya Y. Chandrachud reintroduced the idea of a permanent constitution bench in 2023.

However, Gogoi's reform to single benches, announced in conjunction with the changes to constitution benches, were later enacted. This reform allowed individual judges to hear special leave petitions which were connected to bail or anticipatory bail for offences with a length of up to 7 years, aiming to reduce the backlog in pendency of cases which at the time of the changes in August and September 2019 stood at almost 60,000. Before the reforms, a Supreme court bench had typically always consisted of at least two judges, except for during vacation when single judge benches were used for transfer or criminal or civil cases between courts. The changes also allowed for petitions to transfer criminal cases between courts, under section 406 of the Criminal Procedure Code, to be headed by single judges as well. The amendments were enacted in May 2020, marking the first in its 70 year history it had ever had a single judge bench for the matters.

==== Landmark judgements ====
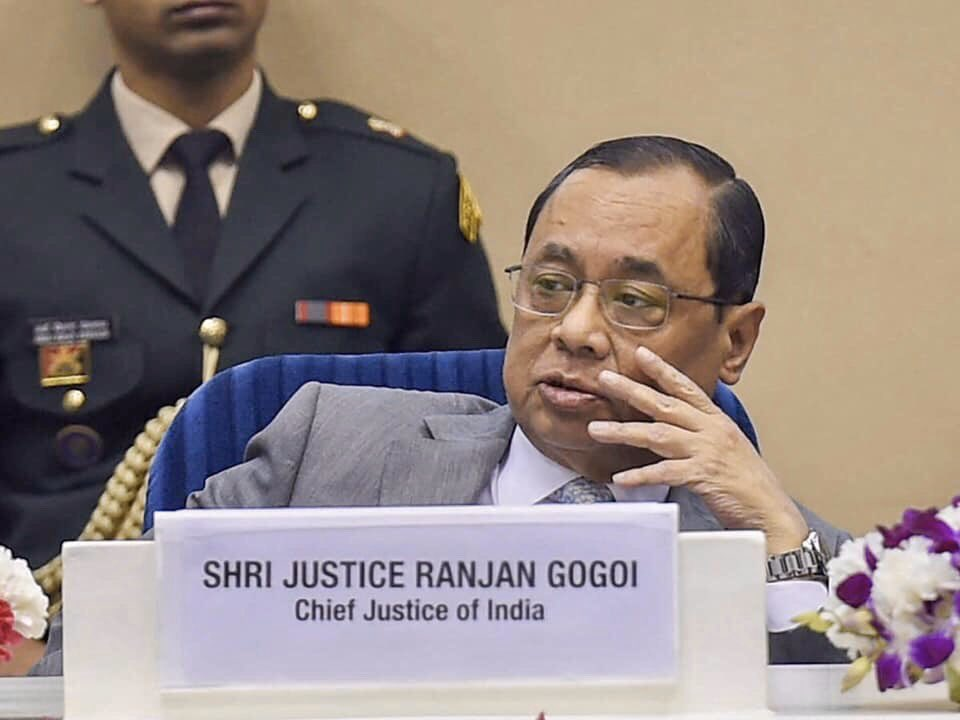
Gogoi, as Chief Justice of India, in 2018.

Gogoi's tenure encompassed numerous landmark judgements on a multitude of cases, which many analysts have noted as a key feature of his legacy. He passed as many as 47 judgements during his tenure as Chief Justice of India. Five of his most consequential judgements came in his last month in office.

Gogoi's most significant judgement is widely accepted to be the verdict on the Ayodhya dispute. Despite initial tension surrounding the verdict, it became widely accepted by all parties involved. After the verdict, many media sources reported how Gogoi had placed his name in history by helping to achieve a resolution to the longstanding dispute. He himself later described the case as the most fiercely contested, hotly debated case in India's legal history. Some legal experts also asserted that the verdict increased his popularity, and thus meant his legacy would be viewed more favourably. He also cancelled his official foreign visits to other countries in order to make time to deliver the verdict. He later recorded in his autobiography that he did not sleep more than 3 or 4 hours during the entire hearing for the case, and that no judge took any days of leave during the three month hearing for the period. He famously stated "enough is enough" in October 2019 while asking for Ayodhya petitioners to end their arguments. Gogoi is also remembered for his role in securing a unanimous verdict; IndiaToday underscored the importance of this, quoting arguments that getting the judgement to be unanimous amongst 5 judges on a constitution bench was a "miracle". The Economic Times also reported this notion: citing how independently minded Justices Bobde and Chandrachud were (and so obtaining a unanimous verdict was more difficult).

Other landmark judgements Gogoi is noted to have been remembered for include his verdicts on the Rafale deal, the entry of women to the Sabarimala, and also bringing the office of Chief Justice of India under the Right to Information Act. Despite his legacy being disputed by various sources and by legal experts, Gogoi is regarded as having had a greatly significant impact on the Indian judiciary. LatestLaws ranked him as one of the greatest Chief Justices in Indian history.

=== Rajya Sabha nomination ===
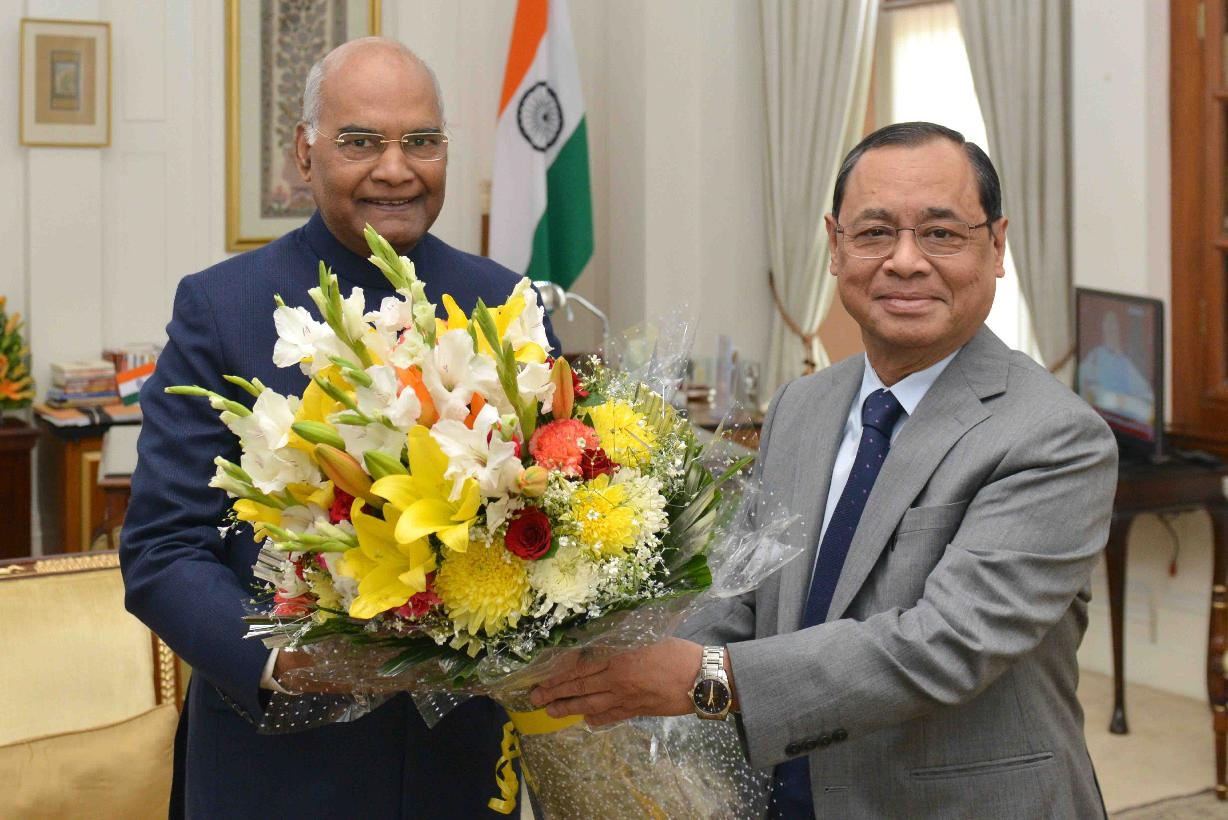
President Ram Nath Kovind (left) nominated Gogoi to the Rajya Sabha.

Gogoi's nomination to the Rajya Sabha sparked national debate and controversy over the independence of the judiciary from the legislature and also post-retirement benefits for judges. Some media outlets described the nomination as "unprecedented", but other sources rejected this assertion; Gogoi is the third Supreme Court judge to serve in the Rajya Sabha, after Ranganath Misra and Baharul Islam. However, Gogoi is the first former Chief Justice to be nominated to his seat, since Misra and Islam were both elected to the Rajya Sabha as members of the Indian National Congress. President Ram Nath Kovind nominated Gogoi in exercise of his powers under Article 80 of the constitution, which specified that the president could nominate members of the Rajya Sabha who had "special knowledge or practical experience" in the fields of "literature, science, art and social service". Though the nomination did not specify what field Gogoi was nominated for, several sources suggested that since judges are luminaries in the field of the law, this falls under the field of social service. Criticism of the nomination focused more on concerns of the public perception of the independence of the judiciary.

Critics of the Gogoi Rajya Sabha nomination alleged two types of wrong: the first alleged that Gogoi delivered favourable judgements for the Modi government in return for the Rajya Sabha seat, and the second alleged that Gogoi had delivered impartial decisions but the nomination called the integrity of those judgements into question.

The nomination was immediately met with criticism from opposition parties of the Modi government, who alleged a quid pro quo over Gogoi's decisions as a judge which they argued were favourable for the Modi government, with many citing the judgements in the Rafale deal case and the Ayodhya dispute. Gogoi soon after rejected these allegations on 19 March 2020, and argued that since the decisions in the Rafale deal case (a three-judge bench) and the Ayodhya dispute (a five-judge bench) were unanimous, then the allegations of a quid pro quo also meant questioning the integrity of all of the other judges involved in both of those cases. Gogoi argued that such allegations were "highly contentious" and "cast an aspersion" on the judges part of the benches, and expressed his desire that the Supreme Court should initiate contempt proceedings against people making the claims. BJP spokesperson Sanjay Mayukh rejected the criticism of the nomination, citing Gogoi as a competent person and the precedent for judges serving in the Rajya Sabha. Former Supreme Court judges Madan Lokur and Kurian Joseph, who had both been a part of the 2018 Supreme Court crisis along with Gogoi, criticised the nomination, with Joseph arguing that the nomination had "shaken the confidence of the common man on the independence of the judiciary". Lokur similarly critiqued the nomination, having told the Indian Express that it redefined the "independence, impartiality and integrity of the judiciary". Former Chief Justice of Delhi High Court Ajit Prakash Shah described it as a "death knell" for the "separation of powers and the independence of the judiciary".

Following the nomination, numerous media outlets called for a cooling-off period between the retirements of judges and post-retirement appointments. The Indian Express rejected the comparisons of Gogoi's nomination to the Rajya Sabha with other former Judges; while referring to the need for cooling-off periods between retirement and post-retirement positions, it cited Misra's period of almost six years and Mohammad Hidayatullah's period of almost ten years, and also argued that Baharul Islam was a member of the Rajya Sabha before becoming a Supreme Court judge and so these instances were incomparable to Gogoi's nomination. Gogoi himself criticised the suggestion of a cooling-off period, asking, in response to the suggestion, how tribunals would be staffed (since they were headed by retired Supreme Court judges). In September 2023, the Supreme Court dismissed a plea seeking a two-year cooling-off period for retired judges accepting political appointments, arguing that it was up to the "better sense" of the retired judge.

After taking his oath, Gogoi stated that the reason he accepted the nomination was that President Kovind requested his service and that the practice was not to refuse the President. He told Republic TV that he accepted the nomination based on a "firm belief" that "when the president requests your services, you don't say no." He also said that he was "looking forward" to his retirement, but when "the call came" he "could not have shirked it" by saying he wanted to take "holidays" or "live life" the way he wanted. ThePrint reported in January 2021 that of Supreme Court judges who had retired since 1999, at least 71% had taken up a post-retirement position.

The government defended the nomination, with Law Minister Kiren Rijiju later arguing in November 2021 that there was "no limit to the discussion" unless there was anything "unconstitutional" about the nomination. At his book launch, of Justice for the Judge, in December 2021, Gogoi rejected the allegations of a quid pro quo over the Ayodhya verdict; he described them as "nonsense" and also blamed the media for suggesting the theory. He also again referred to the ruling being a unanimous decision from five judges. At the launch, he also defended the nomination in an interview with IndiaToday, where he argued that there were other positions offered to retired judges such as a governorship or chairman of the law commission which he asked if would have been preferred to the Rajya Sabha membership, and also asserted that he did not take a salary. He also said that he would "not bow down to extra-constitutional noises".

In November 2022, the Supreme Court dismissed a plea challenging the nomination, stating that they found "no merit" in the petition which claimed that Gogoi was not eligible to be nominated.

== In popular culture ==
Ranjan Gogoi, in a question which referred to his father Keshab Chandra Gogoi, was the answer to a 1 crore question on Kaun Banega Crorepati in 2019. The question asked: the father of which Chief Justice of India was once a Chief Minister of an Indian state?

== See also ==
- List of current members of the Rajya Sabha
- List of nominated members of the Rajya Sabha
- List of former judges of the Supreme Court of India
