= Justice for the Judge =

Autobiography of Ranjan Gogoi

- First edition
- Author: Ranjan Gogoi
- Language: English
- Subject: Autobiography; Memoir
- Publisher: Rupa Publications (India)
- Publication date: 8 December 2021
- Publication place: India
- Media type: E-book, Print (Hardcover)
- Pages: 264 pp.
- ISBN: 9789355201881

Justice for the Judge: An Autobiography is an auto-biography of Ranjan Gogoi, the 46th Chief Justice of India and Member of Rajya Sabha. The book was published by Rupa Publications on 8 December 2021, and released by Gogoi's colleague and successor Chief Justice Sharad Arvind Bobde.

The auto-biography records Gogoi's life from his early years in Dibrugarh to his judicial career in the Supreme Court of India and nomination to the Rajya Sabha. It discusses various events of his tenure and judgements delivered by him, including the 2018 Supreme Court of India crisis, contempt proceedings against Rahul Gandhi, the National Register of Citizens for Assam, the entry of women to Sabarimala, and the Ayodhya verdict.

== Background and release ==
Ranjan Gogoi served as the 46th Chief Justice of India from 2018 to 2019. He previously served as a judge of the Supreme Court of India, and was nominated to serve as a member of the Rajya Sabha in 2020. His judicial career began at Gauhati High Court in 2001, and he later served in the Punjab and Haryana High Court from 2010 to 2012. Gogoi is the second son of former Chief Minister of Assam, Keshab Chandra Gogoi.

The book was published by Rupa Publications, and was released by chief justice Sharad Arvind Bobde, Gogoi's former colleague and successor. The book launch took place at the Prime Ministers' Museum and Library, Teen Murti Bhavan in New Delhi on 8 December 2021. The event was attended by numerous dignitaries, included Bobde, former union law minister Ravi Shankar Prasad, and Assam chief minister Himanta Biswa Sarma. After the release, Gogoi spoke about issues surrounding his tenure in the book with India Today news director Rahul Kanwal at the event.

== Content ==
=== Book summary ===
The narrative of the book, which mostly focuses on Gogoi's judicial career, begins with his early life and education in Dibrugarh, Assam. The book records his account of various events and issues that characterised his tenure, such as the 2018 Supreme Court of India crisis and the 2019 sexual harassment allegations against him. It also discusses the meetings, interactions and private confrontations surrounding the landmark decisions he made while in office, including the judgements on contempt proceedings against Rahul Gandhi, the National Register of Citizens for Assam, the entry of women to Sabarimala, and the Ayodhya verdict.

=== Selected highlights ===
==== Tarun Gogoi allegations ====
In his narration, Gogoi accounts that during 2004–2005 he headed a single-judge bench regarding the appointment of constables in the Assam police. Ranjan Gogoi alleged that Gogoi's mother, Shanti Gogoi, flew from Dibrugarh to Guwahati meet with Chief Minister Tarun Gogoi at his residence. Ranjan Gogoi wrote that Tarun Gogoi requested for his mother to press her son for a judgement that favoured the government, but she declined and only told him of the incident after the judgement had been delivered.

==== Judicial transfers ====
A significant part of the book focuses on the collegium system in the Supreme Court. The book discusses the background of and decision-making behind numerous judicial transfers and elevations that attracted controversy including that of Pradeep Nandrajog, Rajendra Menon, Ajay Kumar Mittal, Surya Kant, Akil Kureshi, Vijaya Tahilramani and an unnamed Delhi High Court judge.

==== Ayodhya verdict ====
On the Ayodhya dispute, Gogoi wrote that his decision to hold daily hearings on the case was an occasion for the judiciary of India to make "an invaluable contribution to the odyssey of mankind", as well as to inspire others on how to resolve inter-faith-related disputes.

==== NRC ====
In his writing on the updating of the National Register of Citizens (NRC) for Assam, Gogoi recorded that a "very senior serving bureaucrat of the Government of India" met him at his residence, and urged him to "go slow" on the NRC matter. Gogoi rejected the request, objecting to interference in his judicial work.

== Reception ==
=== Praise ===
Akshat Agarwal, writing for the Telegraph, in his review described how the Supreme Court played an "outsized role" in the democracy of India, but also how the "day-to-day functioning" of the court remained "shrouded in secrecy". Agarwal assessed that the book revealed many of the "inner workings of the Supreme Court". He also wrote that while the book did not achieve what it set out to accomplish, it "achieves a lot regardless".

Swapnil Tripathi, in his review in Bar and Bench, asserted that "one must commend the book for raising problems plaguing the Indian judiciary". Tripathi wrote Gogoi listed three main issues: the delay in the listing of cases, overcrowding of courts and the rise of Public Interest Litigation (PIL).

=== Critique ===
Aggarwal, in the Telegraph, wrote that Gogoi "avoided describing" the book as a "defence of his actions", but that in many ways the book did "precisely that". Aggarwal stated that much of Gogoi's defence remained unconvincing, questioning both the accuracy of the account, and his treatment of critics in the book."

Arushu John in the Caravan magazine described the book as Gogoi's "desperate bid to set the record straight", while Siddharth Varadarajan, in the Wire, similarly critiqued the book for appearing to defend Gogoi's tenure and actions.

=== Other impacts ===
In 2023, an NRC petitioner, Abhijit Sharma, filed a defamation lawsuit against Gogoi for statements made about him in the book.
