= Harsha Bhattacharjee =

- Born: Silchar, Assam, India
- Education: Silchar Medical College and Hospital, Guwahati Medical College and Hospital
- Occupation: ophthalmologist
- Employer: Sri Sankardev Netralaya
- Known for: Founder of Sri Sankardev Netralaya, Guwahati
- Awards: Assam Baibhav (2025)

Harsha Bhattacharjee is an Indian ophthalmologist in Assam. He is the founding medical director and president of Sri Sankardev Netralaya, Guwahati. He has played a role in the development of modern ophthalmology and specialist medical services in North East India.

In 2026, Bhattacharjee was selected for the Assam Baibhav Award of 2025, the highest civilian honor of the state.

== Early Life and Education ==
Harsh Bhattacharya was born in Silchar. He received his primary education at the public school in Silchar. He enrolled in Silchar Medical College and graduated with an MBBS degree.

While studying medicine, he became interested in ophthalmology. He later obtained his Master's degree in Ophthalmology from Guwahati Medical College. While studying at the Guwahati Medical College, he participated in a research project funded by the Indian Council of Medical Research.

== Career ==
Bhattacharya started his career as a Registrar in the Department of Ophthalmology under the State Health Service of Assam and later served as an Assistant Professor at Guwahati Medical College.

In the late 1980s, he introduced modern methods of cataract surgery in Assam through the implantation of artificial lenses. Feeling the lack of better facilities to treat retinal diseases of the eye, he underwent special training and became proficient in retinal examination and surgery. He played a major role in establishing Sri Sankardev Netralaya in Guwahati on 14 October 1994 with the aim of providing quality eye care to the people of North East India.

On 24 November 1995, the then Prime Minister P. V. Narasimha Rao dedicated the hospital to the country and in 2004 it was recognized as a Center of Excellence by Prime Minister Manmohan Singh. Under his leadership, the hospital expanded its specialist medical care for a variety of eye diseases including cataracts, retina, cornea and glaucoma.

Bhattacharjee also emphasized on community-based eye treatment programs to make better eye care easily available among the poor and rural people. Along with his medical services, he also made significant contributions in medical education, research and postgraduate training and trained and mentored many young ophthalmologists. He received fellowships of the Royal College of Surgeons, Glasgow and the Royal College of Physicians, Edinburgh, in recognition of his contributions to ophthalmology and medical education.

== Awards and honours ==
- 2017 — International Organization for the Prevention of Blindness Eye Health Hero Award.
- 2018 — iFocus Icon Award.
- 2019 — Institution Builder Award for Contribution to Institution Building.
- 2022 — All India Association of Ophthalmologists P.S. Awasthi Award.
- 2023 — Assam Ophthalmology Lifetime Achievement Award.
- 2025 — Selected for the Assam Baibhav Award of the Government of Assam.
