= Assam Baibhav =

Highest civilian award of the Indian state of Assam

- Type: Highest civilian award
- Description: The highest civilian award of Assam
- Country: India
- Presented by: Government of Assam
- Reward: ₹5 lakh (US$5,300)
- Established: 2021; 5 years ago
- First award: 2021: Ratan Tata
- Final award: 2025: Harsha Bhattacharjee

Highlights
- Total: 5

Precedence
- Next (higher): None
- Next (lower): Assam Saurabh

Assam Baibhav is the highest civilian award of the state of Assam, India. On 2 December 2021, chief minister Himanta Biswa Sarma officially declared the award on the occasion of "Asom Diwas" (Assam Day). The award carries a cash prize of ₹5 lakh (US$5,300) and the recipient can avail medical treatment throughout his life at government expense. The obverse of the award is an image of the Jaapi along with the words "Assam Baibhav", inscribed in Assamese script, on a Hollong tree (Dipterocarpus retusus) leaf. In 2021, the Government of Assam conferred the inaugural Assam Baibhav award to Ratan Tata, for "his exceptional contribution towards furthering cancer care in Assam". It has since been awarded annually. The award is limited to not more one induction in a year.

== Recipients ==
#	Year	Portrait	Name	Field
1	2021		Ratan Tata	Social services
2	2022		Tapan Saikia	Healthcare and Public Service
3	2023		Ranjan Gogoi	Law and Justice
4	2024		Lt. Gen. (Retd.) Rana Pratap Kalita	Defence
5	2025		Dr.Harsha Bhattacharjee	Health Care and Public Service
