= National Register of Citizens for Assam =

Indian citizenship database originally by Assam state

A National Register of Citizens (NRC), containing the names and certain relevant information for the identification of genuine Indian citizens, was prepared for the state of Assam after the 1951 Census of India. Since then it was not updated until the major "updation exercise" conducted during 2013–2019, which caused numerous difficulties. In 2019, the Government of India also declared its intention of creating such a registry for the whole of India, leading to major protests all over the country.

After the independence of India, the Indian parliament passed the Immigration (Expulsion from Assam) Act of 1950 due to the concern that Assam was getting indundated with migrants from East Bengal, which had then become part of Pakistan. (Note: According to Kanchan Gupta, the Muslim League government of Bengal had encouraged such migration during 1940–1946, when there was no popular government in Assam. After the partition of India, these patterns of migration continued. (Gupta, Beyond the poll rhetoric 2019, p. 5)) The first National Register of Citizens was prepared in 1951 in order to implement the Act. But the proposed expulsion did not take place due to legal difficulties and administrative apathy, and the Assamese believed that immigration continued unabated.

The process of updating Assam's NRC started in 2013 when the Supreme Court of India passed an order for it to be updated. A bench consisting of justices Ranjan Gogoi and Rohinton Fali Nariman monitored the process continuously. The IAS officer Prateek Hajela was designated the State Coordinator of National Registration. The process invited the inhabitants of Assam to apply for inclusion in NRC by submitting documents that proved their citizenship. Descendants of people registered in the NRC of 1951 as well as of those registered in electoral rolls up to 1971 only needed to demonstrate their descent from such ancestors. Others needed to demonstrate that their ancestors were present in the territory of India prior to 1971.

The final updated NRC for Assam, published 31 August 2019, contained 31 million names out of 33 million population. It left out about 1.9 million people, divided roughly equally between Bengali Hindus, Bengali Muslims and other Hindus from various parts of India. (Note: Multiple sources report that roughly 0.7 million excluded applicants were Muslim. Citizens for Justice and Peace quoted figures from the Intelligence Branch of the Assam government to the effect that fewer than 0.5 million Muslims were of East Bengal origin. A BJP internal survey of the excluded applicants counted 504,800 Bengali Hindus.)

In December 2022, audit by the Comptroller and Auditor General of India revealed several irregularities in the process, such as, exclusion of several indigenous people of Assam, irregularities in utilization of funds in the process and choosing software for the task. The project cost increased from Rs 288.18 crore in 2014 to Rs 1,602.66 crore by March 2022.

== Background ==
During the 19th and 20th centuries, Colonial Assam (1826–1947) witnessed intermittent migration of populace from rest of the provinces of British India in the aftermath of the Yandabo treaty (signed on 24 February 1826) which brought the region under the control of British. The liberal colonial authorities encouraged the migration of peasants from Bengal to Assam in search of fertile lands. As early as 1931, C.S. Mullan, the Census Superintendent in his census report stated:

Probably the most important event in the province during the last 25 years- an event, moreover, which seems likely to alter permanently the whole feature of Assam and to destroy the whole structure of Assamese culture and civilization has been the invasion of a vast horde of land-hungry immigrant, mostly Muslims, from the districts of East Bengal.

=== After 1950 ===
This migration surged, especially that of Hindu Bengali people, from East Pakistan (presently Bangladesh since 1971) after India's independence and subsequent partition into two separate countries namely the secular India and Muslim Pakistan. Following the Partition of India, Pakistan consisted of two isolated landmasses, Pakistan to the west of India and East Pakistan, to the East. Demarcation was loose and without any robust physical barrier or fencing between East Pakistan and India.

Post Partition, East Pakistan suffered from political turmoil and witnessed civil unrest which finally led to a civil war and separation of East Pakistan from Pakistan and a new country Bangladesh came into being consisting of all the geographical area of erstwhile East Pakistan. There occurred mass exodus of population from the war-torn regions into the Indian side and most of these refugees never returned. Excerpts from the White Paper on Foreigners' Issue published by the Home and Political Department, Government of Assam on 20 October 2012 – Chapter 1, Historical Perspective, .section 1.2 reads:

Following Partition and communal riots in the subcontinent, Assam initially saw an influx of refugees and other migrants from East Pakistan. The number of such migrants other than refugees was initially reported by the State Government to be between 1,50,000 and 2,00,000 but later estimated to be around 5,00,000.

Even after the end of civil war and the formation of Bangladesh, migration continued, though illegally. The Government of India already had in its stock of statutes, the Immigrants (Expulsion from Assam) Act, 1950. This act came into effect from 1 March 1950 which mandated expulsion of illegal immigrants from the state of Assam. To identify illegal immigrants, the National Register of Citizens was prepared for the first time in Assam during the conduct of 1951 Census. It was carried out under a directive of the Ministry of Home Affairs (MHA) by recording particulars of every single person enumerated during that Census. Practical implementation of the act was difficult and the measures taken under this act proved ineffective largely due to the vast stretch of the open border between the countries and illegal immigrants pushed out of India at one point of it could easily infiltrate again at some other unmanned point. The issue of illegal infiltration was becoming formidable problem in the state of Assam as migrants enjoyed political patronage. The Registrar General of Census in his report on 1961 Census assessed 2,20,691 infiltrators to have entered Assam.

In the year 1965, the government of India took up with the government of Assam to expedite completion of the National Register of Citizens and to issue National Identity Cards on the basis of this register to Indian citizens towards the identification of illegal immigrants. But in 1966 the Central Government dropped the proposal to issue identity cards in consultation with the Government of Assam, having found the project impracticable.

In a notification issued by the Government of India in the year 1976, the State government was instructed not to deport persons coming from Bangladesh to India prior to March 1971. Thus between 1948 and 1971, there were large scale migrations from Bangladesh (then East Pakistan) to Assam.

=== Assam Accord 1985 ===
Given this continuing influx of illegal migrants from Bangladesh into Assam, suddenly a group of student leaders in 1979 came out in fierce protest demanding detention, disenfranchisement and deportation of illegal immigrants from Assam. They cited unexplained surge of electors in the voter lists for the assembly constituencies in certain pockets of the state, specially in those under then undivided Darrang District of Assam & elsewhere in the districts of lower & central Assam, for which they suspected large scale entry of names of foreigners or illegal migrants in those lists. The events quickly developed into a mass movement which came to be known as Assam Agitation or Assam Movement led by All Assam Students’ Union (AASU) and All Assam Gana Sangram Parishad (AAGSP) and lasted 6 years. The movement culminated in the signing of a landmark Memorandum of Settlement (MoS) - the Assam Accord, between the agitating parties & the Government of India on 15 August 1985, at the behest of then Prime Minister Rajiv Gandhi in New Delhi.

The Accord ended the agitation but could not end the illegal migration. Further it had a negotiated defect which called for 1 January 1966 to be the precise date based on which the detection illegal immigrants in Assam would take place and thus ironically allowing Indian citizenship for all persons coming to the territorial limits of the present-day state of Assam from "Specified Territory" (East Pakistan, presently Bangladesh since 1971) prior to that date.

=== Other New Acts ===
Along with the Accord came a new Illegal Migrants (Determination by Tribunal) Act, 1983 which described a controversial procedure to detect illegal immigrants and their expulsion from the state of Assam. Indian Citizenship Act, 1955 was accordingly amended almost immediately to incorporate provisions by dint of the accord. The act further specified that all persons who came to Assam between to 1 January 1966 (inclusive) and up to 24 March 1971 (midnight) shall be detected in accordance with the provisions of the Foreigners Act, 1946 and the Foreigners (Tribunals) Order, 1964. The name of foreigners so detected would be deleted from the Electoral Rolls in force. Such persons will be required to register themselves before the Registration Officers of the respective districts in accordance with the provisions of the Registration of Foreigners Act, 1939 and the Registration of Foreigners Rules, 1939. Foreigners who came to Assam on or after 25 March 1971 shall continue to be detected, deleted and expelled in accordance with law.

=== Pilot Project 2010 ===
The process of detecting and expelling immigrants suffered from problems for a considerable amount of time. The first attempt of systematically detecting foreigners by updating the National Register in Assam was through a Pilot Project which was started in 2 circles (referred to as Tehsil in some states), one in Kamrup district and another in Barpeta district in the year 2010, which had to be aborted within 4 weeks amidst a huge law and order problem involving a mob attack on the Office of the IAS Commissioner, Barpeta that resulted in police firing killing 4 persons. For a long time, since the bitter experience in the pilot project, NRC update was considered almost an impossible task by the government agencies.

=== Role of the Supreme Court ===
However, the task was again finally taken up at the behest of the Supreme Court of India’s order in the year 2013 in regards to two writ petitions filed by Assam Public Works and Assam Sanmilita Mahasangha & Ors. wherein the Supreme Court, headed by the bench of Justice Ranjan Gogoi and Justice Rohinton Fali Nariman, mandated the Central Government and the State Government to complete the updation of NRC, in accordance with Citizenship Act, 1955 and Citizenship Rules, 2003, in all parts of Assam. Pursuant to the directive of the apex Court, the Registrar General of India via its notification Number S.O. 3591 E dated 6 December 2013 notified commencing of NRC updation.

Since then, the Supreme Court of India has been closely monitoring the process and holding regular hearings on representations made to it by various interested parties and stakeholders. To make the process of NRC update smooth, the Supreme Court in its order dated 21 July 2015 passed the following directions:

We expect all authorities to act faithfully and diligently to carry out their assigned tasks to ensure smooth preparation of NRC and publication thereof within the schedule fixed by us. This is in reiteration of the mandate contained in Article 144 (Note: In reference to Article 144 of the Constitution of India, all authorities, civil and judicial, in the territory of India shall act in aid of the Supreme Court. Article 142 of the Constitution of India further stipulates that the Supreme Court in the exercise of its jurisdiction may pass such decree or make such order as is necessary for doing complete justice in any cause or matter pending before it, and any decree so passed or order so made shall be enforceable throughout the territory of India in such manner as may be prescribed by or under any law made by Parliament and, until provision in that behalf is so made, in such manner as the President may by order prescribe and subject to the provisions of any law made in this behalf by Parliament, the Supreme Court shall, as respects the whole of the territory of India, have all and every power to make any order for the purpose of securing the attendance of any person, the discovery or production of any documents, or the investigation or punishment of any contempt of itself.) of the Constitution of India. It is not necessary for us to emphasise that any person found to be creating any obstruction or hindrance, in any manner, in the preparation of the NRC would be subjected to such orders as this Court would pass in such eventualities.

== Final NRC ==
=== Methodology ===
The mechanism adopted to update the NRC 1951 has been developed from scratch because there is no precedence of such a mammoth task ever undertaken in India or elsewhere that involved identification of genuine citizens and detection of illegal immigrants using technology since it involved data of over 3 crore people and over 6.6 crore documents. The guidelines under which NRC Update has been taken up is as follows –

The process of NRC update is divided into the following phases:

1. Publication of Legacy Data
2. Distribution & Receipt of Application Form
3. Verification Process
4. Publication of Part Draft NRC
5. Complete Publication of Draft NRC
6. Receipt and Disposal of Claims & Objections
7. Publication of Final NRC

=== Publication of Final NRC ===
The Final NRC has been published on 31 August 2019 after completion of all the statutory works as per various standard operating procedures. As per a press release by the SCNRC, a total of 3,30,27,661 persons applied to the registering authority through 68,37,660 application forms and out of which 3,11,21,004 persons were found eligible for inclusion of their names in the final NRC leaving out 19,06,657 persons, who were not included and shall have to approach a Foreigners' Tribunal with an appeal against non-inclusion if they so desire.

=== Controversy on Final NRC ===
As soon as the final NRC was published on 31 August 2019 at 10 AM on completion of the updating the NRC,1951 at all the local, tehsil & district level offices created for the purpose, controversy regarding its correctness set in and even some lawmakers openly came out criticizing the document.

A sitting M.L.A of Assam belonging to the political party All India United Democratic Front (AIUDF) representing the Scheduled Caste-reserved constituency of Abhayapuri South in lower Assam, having found himself out of the NRC, reportedly expressed that thousands of genuine Indians, especially Bengali Hindus, have been left out of final NRC, and as many illegal foreigners have made into the final list.

The Assam Public Works (APW), the original petitioner in the Supreme Court which led to the update of the National Register of Citizens six years ago, said the final NRC turned out to be a 'flawed document' because its prayer for re-verification of the draft list was rejected by the apex court. The NGO also wondered whether the software used in the update exercise was capable of handling so much data.

Widespread protests erupted against the Citizenship Amendment Act, 2019 when read with NRC, across India.The allegation ranged from the Act when applied through the lens of NRC being against the Constitution of India and being discriminatory to Muslims. However, protests in the North Eastern State of India were concerning the effect of the Act and the register eroding the identity of north eastern India by allowing naturalizing of illegal immigrants.

== Eligibility Criteria ==
National Register of Citizens has listed the following classes of persons as being eligible to be included in the NRC:

- Persons whose names appear in the NRC, 1951
- Persons whose names appear in any of the Electoral Rolls up to 24 March (midnight), 1971.
- Descendants of the above persons.
- Persons who came to Assam on or after 1 January 1966 but before 25 March 1971 and registered themselves in accordance with the rules made by the Central Government with the Foreigners Registration Regional Officer (FRRO) and who have not been declared as illegal migrants or foreigners by the competent authority.
- ‘D’ voters can apply for inclusion of their names in the updated NRC. However, their names will be finally included only when the appropriate Foreigner Tribunal declares them as non-foreigners.
- Persons who can provide any one of the documents issued up to midnight of 24 March 1971 as mentioned in the list of documents admissible for citizenship.
- All Indian Citizens including their children and descendants who have moved to Assam post 24 March 1971 would be eligible for inclusion in the updated NRC on adducing satisfactory proof of residence in any part of the country (outside Assam) as on 24 March 1971.

== Updating the NRC ==
The NRC is updated as per the provisions The Citizenship Act, 1955 and The Citizenship (Registration of Citizens and Issue of National Identity Cards) Rules, 2003 (As amended by 1. G. S. R. 803(E), dated 9 November 2009 (with effect from 9/11/2009.), Ministry of Home Affairs (Office of Registrar General, India), Order No. S.O. 596(E), dated 15 March 2010, published in the Gazette of India, Extra, Part II. No. 504 S.3(ii), dated 16 March 2010 p. 1.). As per the two statutes, the eligibility status would be ascertained based on the NRC, 1951, Electoral Rolls up to 1971 and in their absence the admissible documents up to 24 March (midnight) 1971.

Updating the National Register of Citizens (NRC) in the state of Assam is the most extensive citizen-engaging exercise undertaken in any Indian state, perhaps the first of its kind even globally, that touches the lives of every resident of the state. Once the Registrar General of India appointed Prateek Hajela as the State Coordinator for the project:

- Setting up of an Innovative Technical Mechanism: NRC update project in Assam required new systems for residents’ data collection, processing and management of the data so collected, document scanning, verification and digitizing. Development of over twenty large custom software applications, over 2500 digitization hubs and a state of art Data Centre, and extensive manpower involvement (involving over 30,000 government officers and 10,000 contractual/ outsourced staff) was set up to take on the process of the NRC update.
- Setting up of NRC Seva Kendras (NSK): In order to aid and assist the public in enrolling themselves in the NRC update process Information and communications technology (ICT) enabled Help Desks named NRC Seva Kendras (NSKs) were set up across the state. NRC Seva Kendras (NSK) were set up in each district of Assam; each NSK covering an approximate of 2,500 households^{[b]}. NSK acts as the epicentre for all the NRC activities starting from assisting the public in searching the Legacy Data, distribution of Application Form, receipt of Application Form, carrying out all the data entry work, displaying of Draft NRC and so on. Each NSK is equipped with sophisticated software for Legacy Data Search in three languages, namely English, Assamese and Bengali & besides that, adequate hardware such as computers, scanners, & furniture are made available for public convenience.
- Publication of Legacy Data: To claim eligibility for inclusion in NRC the applicants had to prove their residence in Assam (or in any part of the country) up to 24 March 1971. As per statutory requirement, the NRC authorities had to publish copies of NRC 1951 and Electoral Rolls of all years up to 24 March 1971 (collectively named as Legacy Data). Easy accessibility of these documents was the key to ensure effective public engagement in the process. About 6.26 lakh pages of such old documents were available across the state, but most of those were in poor condition as can be seen in the image of Original NRC 1951. It would not have been possible for the public to search for their names in the heaps of dilapidated documents. To address this concern, NRC authority decided to digitize and develop the legacy data and make it available in an easily searchable format. 2.01 crore records were digitized and were assigned a Unique "Legacy Data Code" from 6.26 lakh pages of such legacy documents. All these pages were then converted into images through photographic scanning and assigned unique image IDs and linked to the 2.01 crore records for preserving the database, establishing the unique identity of records and producing true copies of Legacy Data for publication. The data was transliterated to make it search enabled in Assamese, English, and Bengali. Out of the total 8 crore words found in the Legacy Database, an "Assam Data Dictionary" was prepared with 24 lakhs unique words. 25 GB of SQL database and 240 GB image files were installed in a short span of 10 days in 5000 laptops spread over 2500 NRC Seva Kendras (NSKs) specially set up for free search and issue of Legacy Data. The legacy database was also made available on the public domain through NRC Website. Issue of 77 lakh Legacy Data Codes in NSKs and 68 lakh through the web in a period of 6 months proved to be the game-changer in NRC update. Out of 68.23 lakh Application Forms received from the public, 95% of applicants submitted Legacy Data as supporting documents to prove their claim for inclusion in NRC. This indicates to the indispensability of Legacy Data development exercise which set the ball rolling for NRC update

=== Documents to be furnished ===
Two sets of documents had to be furnished by the applicants for inclusion in the updated NRC. They are -

- List A Documents: For inclusion of names of any person in updated NRC, the applicants must produce any one of the following List A documents issued before 24 March (midnight), 1971 where the name of self or ancestor appears (to prove residence in Assam up to 24 March (midnight), 1971) - 1951 NRC, Electoral Roll(s) up to 24 March (midnight), 1971, Land & Tenancy Records, Citizenship Certificate, Permanent Residential Certificate, Refugee Registration Certificate
- List B Documents: If any of the documents of List A is not of the applicant himself/herself but that of an ancestor, namely, father or mother or grandfather or grandmother or great-grandfather or great-grandmother (and so on) the applicant then have to submit List B documents to establish relationship with such ancestor, i.e., father or mother or grandfather or grandmother or great-grandfather or great-grandmother, etc. whose name appears in List A. Such documents shall have to be legally acceptable document which clearly proves such relationship. The applicants must produce any one of the following List B to establish the linkage: Birth Certificate, Land document, Board/University Certificate, Bank/LIC/Post Office records, Any other legally acceptable document.

=== Distribution and Receipt of Application Process ===
For the convenient update of NRC, the application process was facilitated to the public in both online and offline modes.

- Offline: People opting for the offline mode had to visit their nearest NSK for filling up and submission of their application forms. The NSKs received applications from 9 AM till 6 PM, sometimes till late hours depending on the footfall of the public. Every applicant received a photocopy of his/her entire form submitted along with an acknowledgment receipt containing a unique Application Receipt Number (ARN) issued against the form.
- Online: For the Online mode of application, NRC online form was made available to the public. People opting for online mode had the option of submitting the form via their smartphones and tablet devices as well, in addition to accessing the form via a desktop/Laptop. The online process was also made convenient for applicants who lacked access to stable internet connection; preventing them from going through with the online application process uninterrupted. This was done by integrating an innovative offline-online facility of form receipt, which allowed offline filling up of Form and online submission as and when network connectivity is available.

Distribution and Receipt of Application Form took off initially on 9 May 2015 with a trial run of the NRC Application Receipt Software at Chandrapur 3 NSK under Chandrapur circle of Kamrup Metropolitan. Soon after, the Application Receipt phase was launched in May 2015 and the online submission facility was launched on 22 June 2015. Application Forms were distributed house to house by government functionaries in the entire state and could be collected by the applicants from the NRC Seva Kendra's (NSKs) in case it was lost or damaged.

The guidelines of form fill up were made available in the form of instruction sheets distributed during the Community Awareness Meetings, video tutorials were developed and made available online as well as distributed in the form of CDs in each district at the capacity building meetings, toll free helpline numbers were made available.

The NRC Seva Kendras (NSKs) served as the Application Receipt Centres.

The online receipt of application forms allowed the user to submit their registration details online, submit their NRC Application Forms online and finally generate their Acknowledgement Receipt Number on successful submission of the forms online.

A first of its kind combination of the online and offline facility was introduced for benefit of the rural public. The application was introduced at a later stage and could be accessed through any Government-authorized Common Service Center (CSC)/Arunoday Kendra. The Common Services Centres are being operated by the Village Level Entrepreneurs (VLE) who ensure the percolation of the National e-Governance Plan at the grass-root level. In total 1148 SAHAJ Arunoday Kendras have been rolled out so far in the State of Assam, out of mandated 2833 Centres to July 2009), Cyber Cafes, any friend or internet access point for uploading photos and supporting documents. The e-form was made available at the NRC Assam website www.nrcassam.nic.in from 6 August 2015 onwards, through which anyone could download the e-form or copy in pen drives from the CSCs. One could easily fill up the e-form online or offline as per their convenience from literally anywhere.

The last date of receipt of the Application Form was 31 August 2019.

=== Verification Process ===
The sole objective of the verification process is to ensure that no ineligible person gets entry into the updated NRC and that no genuine person is left out form the NRC. The verification process consists of the following steps:

- Office Verification
- DOCSMEN - Document Segregation and Meta-Data Entry
- Field Verification (Note: VTR serves two purposes – first by making the job of Verification Teams easy by providing pre populated data related to applicants systematically in one page where the Teams have to record the result only in "Yes"/"No" format. Additionally, the VTR also indicated the fields in which the applicants have not provided full detail in their Forms so that the Verifying Officers can complete those during field verification. The second purpose served by VTRs is to allow quality checking of the first round of application form data digitization done by operators. As VTRs are taken to field for the recording of results, the VTRs get a chance to correct any digitization error and take the second opinion on the spelling of names, surnames, etc. directly from the applicants.)
- Family Tree Matching Technique

Final eligibility for the inclusion of names is determined only if the results of all the three verification process -field verification, office verification, and Family Tree Matching- are found positive. As mandated in the Citizenship Rules, 2003 all cases, after ascertaining final eligibility at LRCR level, is referred to the DRCR for his/her approval before publishing the Part Draft NRC and Complete Draft NRC.

Verification of Family Tree commenced on 15 February 2018 in Assam. Applicants whose family tree details mismatch with other members of the family will be called for family tree verification. Mismatches arising due to giving nicknames in family tree details, name/ surname changes due to marriage, missing out names of all family members due to lack of knowledge or ignorance, etc., will be corrected during these proceedings.

Applicants will receive Letter of Information (LOI) delivered at their households by NRC field level functionaries. Details of date, time and venue will be mentioned in the LOI. However, those who receive this letter should not think their application is considered doubtful or will lead to exclusion from NRC. It is an opportunity to ensure the Legacy of each genuine citizen is protected from being misused by any unauthorized person to wrongfully enter NRC.

A few applicants whose names are already included in Part Draft NRC may also receive an LOI. In such cases, they need to appear and testify to stop people from misusing their Legacy Data mischievously.

=== Publication of Part Draft NRC ===
The first part of draft NRC, known as the Part Draft NRC has been published on expiry of midnight of 31 December 2017 by the Office of the State Coordinator of National Registrar (Assam) in all the villages/wards where the Application Forms were issued and received. The total number of people included in the Part Draft NRC is 19010932 members out of 3.29 crore applicants.

Following facilities were made available for the general public to check their name in the Part Draft NRC:

- Visiting Designated NSK (1 January 2018 to 31 January 2018)
- Online Publication on the website (until 5 February 2018)
- Toll-Free Helpline Facility
- Pre-registration SMS Service
- On-Demand SMS Service

A total of 1,90,10,932 names of applicants have been included in the Part Draft NRC out of a total of 3.29 crore applicants. The names of remaining applicants will be included in the Final Draft NRC if found eligible after the entire verification process is completed. Also, names of applicants who submitted GP Secretary Certificates haven't featured in the Part Draft NRC as their verification was on hold until the ruling of the Supreme Court on 5 December 2017; stating that GP Secretary certificates can be used as a valid identity document for claiming citizenship. Therefore, verification of applicants who submitted GP Secretary Certificates has been resumed after the publication of Part Draft NRC; and if found eligible, will be included in the Final Draft NRC in Assam.

=== Complete Publication of Draft NRC ===
The Complete Draft NRC was published on 30 July 2018 consisting of names of all those persons who have been found eligible after the entire verification process was completed.

=== Receipt and disposal of Claims and Objections ===
Applicants who did not find their place in the Final Draft NRC could once again furnish any of the 15 admissible documents to prove their eligibility. They could either submit the same documents that they had submitted during the application or can submit any fresh documents. The process of filing Claims and Objections began from 25 September 2018 amidst all anxiety for some and amidst all eagerness for others. Applicants had to fill up the Claim Form and submit to the NRC Seva Kendras where they have applied earlier during the Application Phase. The process of submitting Claims and Objections began from 25 September 2018 and continued till 31 December 2018 as per the Supreme Court's order. The disposal of claims and objections was then carried out with the objective that the process of claims and objections is fair and transparent and provides a reasonable opportunity to all concerned.

=== Publicity Measures Undertaken to Empower the Public about NRC ===
Considering the sensitivity of the matter and the magnitude of the project, it was important to reach out to the public in a meticulous way and ensure complete public awareness. For this, a strategic information dissemination and communication plan was adopted. A 360 degree IEC and media campaign was designed and implemented for generating awareness and dissemination of information to target audience across Assam/India/Globally through the following platforms: Community Level Meetings (CLMs), Leaflets, Video Tutorials, Field Level Speakers (FLS), Print Media, Electronic Media, Social Media, NRC Website.

=== Grievance Redressal Mechanism ===
For active public participation, a one-stop Grievance Redressal System was developed and implemented through which the complaints/grievances related to NRC can be addressed.

== Innovative Use of Technology: Barriers and Strategies ==
Extensive use of IT was developed and deployed to use in the NRC process. Some of the major breakthroughs in IT usage are listed below:

Barriers	Strategies
The first and the biggest barrier was that there was no precedence until the date of any other project that was to decide the future of the state - its residents in terms of the status of "citizen".	Several brainstorming sessions were undertaken with stakeholders for suggestions, consultations with IT pundits, the launching of pilot exercises of various processes and implementation of sophisticated software to gauge the magnanimity of the exercise and volume of transaction that is required to be done in due course of time.
Tracing linkage of all residents up to the cut-off date of 24 March (midnight), 1971 has been the biggest challenge.	The tracing of linkage was made possible by digitisation and development of Legacy Data and publishing the Legacy Data to make it available to the people of Assam.
Application Form Submission by the public in place of the house to house enumeration and building capacity of the public to correctly fill up the form.	Facility for offline/online submission of Form and extensive capacity building exercise to enable public to fill up the form on their own. To know more.
Verification of documents with the backend for establishing authenticity	Development of sophisticated customised software known as "DOCSMEN – Document Segregation and Meta-Data Entry" used for slicing and segregating about 6.6 crore documents..
Ensuring that the Legacy Data easily made available by NRC Authorities is not misused	In order to ensure that the Legacy Data is not misused by any impostor to claim inclusion in NRC, an innovative Family Tree Matching Technique is used.
Vetting of each case by the Deputy Commissioner/District Registrar of Citizen Registration (DRCR)	As the law provides for the DRCR to vet each and every case before publishing the NRC, software has been prepared to make this provision implementable. The verification process being multi-stage, poses a requirement for developing a complete performance report card to display the performance of each applicant across parameters such as house to house verification, document backend verification, family tree match result, matching of photo submitted in the form with the actual person etc. to enable taking the final call on his/her eligibility for inclusion. The Local Verification Officer designated as local Registrar also need to capture the verification results received from various issuing authorities. Consequently, the software has been developed for generating Combined Verification Report and recording the final recommendation of the local Registrar based on one's performance across parameters. As per statutory requirement of taking the final decision on the eligibility of applicants by the Deputy Commissioner/District Collector designated as District Registrar, the recommendation of the Local Verifying Officers designated as Local Registrars are required to be referred to the District Registrar.
Setting up of state-of-the-art Data Center at office premise of the State Coordinator, NRC at Guwahati.	A state-of-the-art Data Center was established in the office premise of the State Coordinator, NRC at Guwahati. Some of the highlights of the Data Center were: In-Box Fluid Solution (Rittal from Germany); Only installation in India and 2nd globally; 11 Blade Servers, 3 Rack Servers (40 TB) – in High Availability Mode; Automatic temperature control, CCTV and inbuilt Security Alarm System; Fire Proof, Oracle OVM (Virtual Machine Manager) 26 Virtual Machines; Virtual Tape Library; Hyper V installed; 50 MBPS main link from BSNL and redundancy from Trans Virtual
Proper connectivity had to be ensured from NRC Data Center to field offices like CRCR and DRCR and also to the System Integrator Data Entry Centre (SIDEC)	A huge volume of data has been transmitted from state to field (district/circle/NSK level) and again from the field to state. Various medium of data transmission has been used such as third-party media (pen drive/hard disk), FTP (File Transfer Protocol), internet/MPLS. NRC project has put Assam State Wide Area Network (ASWAN) and NICNET to its maximum use for the purpose of sending documents to districts and circles for verification and for uploading the results of verification to the central server. ASWAN connectivity is utilized to connect 114 circles to State Data Center and for remaining 43 circles, services of BSNL have been procured. NICNET connectivity at district offices was leveraged to connect to the State Data Centre. In the process, the existing infrastructure and efficiency of ASWAN and NICNET have been strengthened. Data synchronization of from remote areas to state data centre can be counted amongst the record-setting accomplishments of the project.

Without extensive IT deployment and development of bespoke solutions like digitized legacy data development, document segregation and metadata entry, micromanagement and business development tools for daily appraisal of the performance of 2500 centres (NSK), 157 Tehsil offices and all districts, implementation of this Supreme Court-monitored project would not have been possible within short timelines. No other IT project of this scale has been implemented in Assam that covered 100% households in the state.

== Creation of additional Foreigners' Tribunals ==
On 30 May 2019, the Government of India passed a Foreigners' (Tribunals) Amendment Order 2019, which allows all states & UTs within the India to constitute their own Foreigners' Tribunals, earlier unique to the state of Assam only, to address the question of citizenship of a person. The amendment empowers district magistrates in all states and union territories to set up Foreigners' Tribunals to detect foreigners. Following the Amendment, the provincial Government of Assam has initiated the process of establishing 400 additional Foreigners' Tribunals out of which 200 are made functional since beginning of September 2019.

== Construction of Detention Camps ==
The Government of the state is also set to construct ten more detention camps besides six already in place in anticipation of the possible requirement to house a large number of illegal foreigners who may be declared as such by the Foreigners' Tribunals. The first such new exclusive detention camp is under construction in the district of Goalpara in lower Assam at cost of around Rs 460 million and a capacity to hold 3000 persons.

== Support for NRC Assam ==
CPI (M) supported NRC Assam, and welcomed the publication of the final list that excluded nearly two million people. CPM Assam secretary Deben Bhattacharya was of the opinion that "NRC has seen the light of the day because of the hard labour of 52,000 employees and patience of the people of Assam. We urge the government to provide the 3,11,21,004 people whose names have been included in the list with identity cards as soon as possible. The party justified NRC Assam; "the updating of the NRC in Assam came about in specific historical and political circumstances". The government should also consider ways to scrutinise the names left out in the draft NRC but included in the final one because of human error". CPI (M) also extended support for conducting NRC in Tripura.

== Impact of NRC over women ==
NRC in Assam has affected women a lot and put them on disadvantaged footing by asking them to establish their link to parental home as lacs of minor girls, married before attaining the age of eighteen, failed to establish proof of residency. The identity of most women is associated with husbands in India. The National Family Health Survey data reveals that in char dominated districts of Assam, nearly half of the women get married before the age of eighteen. When women are married off before attaining the age an adult, they cannot get enlisted in the voters list from their parental house. In absence of other documents like educational certificates and marksheets (due to illiteracy), it removes any legal link to their parental home. This forces them to opt for panchayat certificates to prove linkage with parents only to get such documents to be rejected.

== See also ==
- Citizenship Amendment Bill 2016
- The Foreigners Act, 1946
- Indian nationality law
- Illegal Migrants (Determination by Tribunal) Act, 1983
- Illegal immigration to India
- Refugees in India

== Bibliography ==
- White Paper on Foreigners Issue, Government of Assam, 2012
- Gupta, Kanchan (2019), Beyond the poll rhetoric of BJP's contentious Citizenship Amendment Bill, Observer Research Foundation
- Kumar, Alok Prasanna (21 July 2018), "National Register of Citizens and the Supreme Court", Economic and Political Weekly, 53 (29)
- Ranjan, Amit (2019). "National Register of Citizen Update: History and its impact". Asian Ethnicity. 22 (3): 1–17. doi:10.1080/14631369.2019.1629274. S2CID 198727392.
- Weiner, Myron (June 1983), "The Political Demography of Assam's Anti-Immigrant Movement", Population and Development Review, 9 (2), Population Council: 279–292, doi:10.2307/1973053, JSTOR 1973053
- Malik, Shahnawaz Ahmed, Future of Citizenship Laws in India With Special Reference to Implementation of NRC in Assam (July 31, 2020). Journal of Legal Studies and Research, Volume 6 Issue 4 – August 2020, ISSN: 2455-2437, Available at SSRN
- Assam NRC (National Register of Citizens), A Study of Defects and Solutions on National Register of Citizens (NRC) of Assam, By Geeta Sharma, Pawan Kumar Sharma, Minu Sharma · 2020
