= Shrinjan Rajkumar Gohain =

Indian chess player (born 1990)

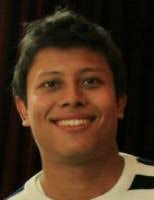

Personal information
- Born: 18 August 1990 (age 36) Assam, India

Chess career
- Country: India
- FIDE rating: 1905 (November 2015)
- Education: St. Joseph's College of Commerce

Shrinjan Rajkumar Gohain (Rajkumar Shrinjan Singha; born 18 August 1990) is an Indian chess player. He is the former Indian chess champion and an Arena Grandmaster who has represented his state, Assam, and India in numerous tournaments.

== Personal life ==
Shrinjan Rajkumar Gohain was born in a Tai-Ahom family and descends from the Ahom dynasty with his family residences at Guwahati, Moran in Dibrugarh District and Titabor in Jorhat District of Assam. His father's family can be traced back to Ahom Kingdom's royal family of Swargadeo Gadadhar Singha who established the rule of Tungkhungia royal house of Ahom kings, whose descendants continued to rule till the climactic end of the Ahom kingdom in 1826. Gohain is a direct descendant and seventh and sixth Great-grandsons of Ahom Kings Swargadeo Rudra Singha and Swargadeo Rajeswar Singha.

== Education ==
Gohain attended Maria's Public School in Guwahati before moving to Bangalore to complete pre-university studies. He then went to St. Joseph's College of Commerce, Bangalore.
