= Kaleeswaram Raj =

Indian lawyer

- Born: Kerala
- Occupation: Lawyer
- Years active: Present
- Known for: Civil, criminal and constitutional law

Kaleeswaram Raj is an Indian lawyer practising in the Supreme Court of India and the High Court of Kerala. He has successfully argued for decriminalisation of the offence of adultery in India.

== Legal career ==
Raj practises in the fields of civil, criminal and constitutional law. There are about five hundred reported judgments on which he is counsel of record. Before the Supreme Court of India, in Joseph Shine v Union of India, he appeared as the lead counsel for the petitioner. In that case, the top court of India struck down Section 497 of the Indian Penal Code, which criminalised adultery, as unconstitutional.

He also appeared before the Supreme Court of India in the Government advertisements case (2015), Kerala Liquor Policy case and National Highway liquor ban case (2017). He was appointed as Amicus curiae in various cases. He appeared for the victims of the endosulfan tragedy in the Kasargod district in Kerala. In that case the Supreme Court of India directed the Kerala Government to pay compensation to the child victims. He has also argued in the Maratha reservation case in which the Constitution Bench of the Supreme Court set aside the reservation as excessive, illegal and unconstitutional. Raj has argued in the case relating to Freedom of Speech of public functionaries in which the Constitution Bench of the Supreme Court said that no additional restrictions can be imposed upon them, other than what is permissible under Article 19(2) of the Constitution. He appeared before another Constitution Bench in Janhit Abhiyan Vs Union of India. In this case the Supreme Court upheld the 103rd amendment to the Constitution that introduced quota for economically weaker sections. In Indian Medicines Pharmaceuticals Corporation Ltd Vs Kerala Ayurvedic Co-Operative Society Ltd & Ors, where he was the respondent's counsel, the Supreme Court reiterated the need for transparent process of public tenders in the Government contracts.

The Supreme Court in Anoop Baranwal Vs Union of India ", has accepted his contentions in support of the petitioners. In this litigation, the Constitution Bench of the court directed that an independent body consisting of the Chief Justice of India, Prime Minister and the Opposition Leader has to select the Election Commission of India. However, this judgment was later on nullified by the Parliament which enacted a law that excluded the Chief Justice from the selection Committee.

Raj appeared for aggrieved candidates in Anoop M. and others Vs Gireeshkumar T.M and others, where the court held that an instrumentality of the state like the Public Service Commission should maintain probity and transparency in their actions, without resorting to falsehoods before the court. Also, he appeared in State of Kerala & Ors Vs Durgadas & Anr, where the top court said that employment in public service cannot be denied solely based on the allegations in a criminal case that ended in an acquittal.

On December 2, 2025, his contentions for protecting the rights of the disabled in the Indian prisons were accepted by the Supreme Court and comprehensive directions were issued in this regard.

== Writing ==
Raj has written articles appeared in leading newspapers in India, including The Hindu, The New Indian Express, The Times of India, Deccan Herald and The Statesman, as well as journals such as Economic and Political Weekly, Frontline and Mainstream Weekly. He has also written in the law journals.

His published works in English include "Commentaries on Marumakkathayam law" (1995, along with Ms. K.P. Suchitra), "The Spirit of Law" (2012), "Rethinking Judicial Reforms: Reflections on Indian Legal System" (2017) and "Constitutional Concerns: Writings on Law and Life" (2022).

His autobiography 'Ormayile Rithubhedangal' was published in malayalam in 2025 by Mathrubhumi Books.
