= Rohinton Fali Nariman =

Indian judge (born 1956)

- रोहिंटन फली नरीमन
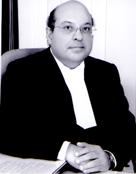
- Official portrait

Judge of the Supreme Court of India
- In office 7 July 2014 – 12 August 2021
- Nominated by: Rajendra Mal Lodha
- Appointed by: Pranab Mukherjee

Solicitor General of India
- In office 27 July 2011 – 4 February 2013
- Appointed by: Pratibha Patil

Personal details
- Born: 13 August 1956 (age 70) Bombay, Bombay State, (now Mumbai, Maharashtra, India
- Spouse: Sanaya Nariman
- Parent: Fali Sam Nariman (father)
- Education: Shri Ram College of Commerce (B.Com Hons.); University of Delhi (LLB); Harvard University (LLM)

Rohinton Fali Nariman (born 13 August 1956) is a former judge of the Supreme Court of India. Before being elevated as a judge, he practised as a senior counsel at the Supreme Court. He was appointed the Solicitor General of India on 23 July 2011. He also served as a member of the Bar Council of India. He was designated as a Senior Counsel by Chief Justice Manepalli Narayana Rao Venkatachaliah in 1993 at the early age of 37.

== Early life and education ==
Nariman is the son of Fali Sam Nariman, a distinguished Indian jurist. He received his early education in Mumbai, at the Cathedral and John Connon School. He completed his undergraduate B.Com. degree from Shri Ram College of Commerce. He completed his Bachelor of Laws from Campus Law Centre of the Faculty of Law, University of Delhi, where he ranked 2nd in the batch. He then went to Harvard Law School for his Master of Laws degree in 1980–81 where he was taught by stalwarts like Laurence Tribe and Roberto Mangabeira Unger.

== Career ==
Nariman joined the Bar as an advocate in 1979. The Times of India placed him among the top ten lawyers of his time. After his year at Harvard, he practised maritime law in New York at Haight, Gardner, Poor & Havens for a year.

He was designated as a senior advocate at the Supreme Court of India from 15 December 1993 at the young age of 37. While appointing him Chief Justice Manepalli Narayana Rao Venkatachaliah amended the rules as Nariman was of 37 years old and the minimum age for being made a senior in the Supreme Court was 45.

He has been practising law for the last 30 years and has more than 500 reported Supreme Court judgments to his credit. He is an expert in Comparative Constitutional Law and Civil Law. He has argued numerous cases, including the constitutional bench judgments of P.A. Inamdar v. State of Maharashtra and State of Punjab v. Devans Modern Breweries Ltd.

In a case he argued, Enercon (India) Ltd. v. Enercon GMBH, Civil Appeal No. 2086 of 2014, Nariman has clarified the arbitration law on the seat/venue dichotomy. Khoday Distilleries Ltd. v. Scotch Whisky Assn., (2008) 10 SCC 723 is a landmark case in trademark law wherein the arguments of Nariman that the class of buyer may be relevant to the determination of a passing off action and it is not always the test of the prudent man which would apply was accepted.

He has argued the cases for theatre artist Vijay Tendulkar and the controversy-marred play Sakharam Binder. He claims that these two cases have been the turning points of his life. He has handled the high-profile case of gas sharing between the Reliance Industries Limited (led by Mukesh Ambani) and Anil Dhirubhai Ambani Group (which is led by Anil Ambani).

He has set up the Supreme Court Lawyers Welfare Trust which works for the welfare of lawyers and encourages young talent.

=== Solicitor General ===
Nariman was of 55 years old when he was appointed the Solicitor General of India.

==== Resignation ====
After being at the post of Solicitor General of India for eighteen months, Nariman resigned on 4 February 2013. The reason for this is not known though it was said that he shared a poor rapport with the then-Law Minister Ashwani Kumar.

=== Supreme Court of India ===
Nariman was elevated as a judge of the Supreme Court on 7 July 2014. He was the fifth Supreme Court judge to be elevated directly from the Bar. He reached the retirement age of 65 on 12 August 2021.

== Publications ==
In November 2016, Nariman's book on the Zoroastrian religion, The Inner Fire, was released. The book is an analysis of the Gathas.

== Notable judgements ==
=== Freedom of speech ===
Nariman and Jasti Chelameswar formed the two judge bench of the Supreme Court of India which struck down a controversial law which gave Indian police the power to arrest anyone accused of posting emails or other electronic messages which "causes annoyance or inconvenience". The judges held Section 66A of the Information Technology Act, which made such offenses punishable up to three years imprisonment, to be unconstitutional. The judgement was authored by Nariman. According to Nariman and Chelameswar, several terms in the law they were striking down were "open-ended, undefined and vague" which made them nebulous in nature. According to the judges: "What may be offensive to one may not be offensive to another. What may cause annoyance or inconvenience to one may not cause annoyance or inconvenience to another."

In their judgement, the judges clarified that a distinction needs to be made between discussion, advocacy, and incitement. Any discussion, or advocacy of even an unpopular cause cannot be restricted, and it is only when such discussion or advocacy reaches the level of incitement whereby it causes public disorder or affects the security of the state can it be curbed.

The judgement has been welcomed for defending the Indian Constitution's ideals of tolerance and the constitutional provisions of free speech. It has been pointed out that the controversial law struck down by Nariman and Chelameswar had gained notoriety after many people in India started getting arrested for seemingly innocuous reasons on the ground that they had violated the now scrapped law.

=== Triple Talaq ===
In a landmark judgement, a five-judge bench struck down instantaneous triple talaq by 3–2 majority and termed it void, illegal and unconstitutional. While Justice Kurian Joseph, Justice Nariman and Justice U. U. Lalit struck down the practice; Chief Justice JS Khehar and Justice S. Abdul Nazeer asked parliament to make a law in this regard. Justice Nariman's judgement was against the practice of Triple Talaq where he stated "Triple Talaq is a disapproved form of divorce. Even the Hanafi law says triple talaq is sinful. 1937 Act recognizes triple talaq and therefore does not violate Article 13. It is not possible for the court to fold his hands when petitioners come to court. Practice of triple talaq is bad and can be tested as legislation."

=== Sabarimala ===
Justice Nariman, along with Justice DY Chandrachud, delivered a dissent in Kantaru Rajeevaru v. Indian Young Lawyers Association. He held that the decision of five judges in the Sabarimala case which held that women of the ages of ten and fifty shall not be denied entry to the Sabarimala temple is not a fit case for the exercise of review jurisdiction as the judgment does not suffer from an error apparent on the face of record. The dissent observed that the executive is under a constitutional obligation to implement the decisions of the Supreme Court even if they were not parties before them. Justice Nariman observed:

Bona fide criticism of a judgment, albeit of the highest court of the land, is certainly permissible, but thwarting, or encouraging persons to thwart, the directions or orders of the highest court cannot be countenanced in our Constitutional scheme of things.
