= Mohammad Rafiq (judge) =

Former Chief Justice of Himachal Pradesh High Court

Hon'ble Chief Justice (Retd.) Mohammad Rafiq
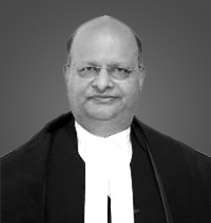

26th Chief Justice of Himachal Pradesh High Court
- In office 14 October 2021 – 24 May 2022
- Nominated by: N. V. Ramana
- Appointed by: Ram Nath Kovind
- Preceded by: L. Narayana Swamy; Ravi Malimath (acting)
- Succeeded by: A. A. Sayed; Sabina (acting)

26th Chief Justice of Madhya Pradesh High Court
- In office 3 January 2021 – 13 October 2021
- Nominated by: S. A. Bobde
- Appointed by: Ram Nath Kovind
- Preceded by: Ajay Kumar Mittal; Sanjay Yadav (acting)
- Succeeded by: Ravi Malimath

31st Chief Justice of Orissa High Court
- In office 27 April 2020 – 2 January 2021
- Nominated by: S. A. Bobde
- Appointed by: Ram Nath Kovind
- Preceded by: K. S. Jhaveri; Sanju Panda (acting)
- Succeeded by: S. Muralidhar

8th Chief Justice of Meghalaya High Court
- In office 13 November 2019 – 26 April 2020
- Nominated by: Ranjan Gogoi
- Appointed by: Ram Nath Kovind
- Preceded by: Ajay Kumar Mittal; H. S. Thangkhiew (acting)
- Succeeded by: Biswanath Somadder

Judge of Rajasthan High Court
- In office 15 May 2006 – 12 November 2019
- Nominated by: Y. K. Sabharwal
- Appointed by: A. P. J. Abdul Kalam
- Acting Chief Justice
- In office 7 April 2019 – 4 May 2019
- Appointed by: Ram Nath Kovind
- Preceded by: Pradeep Nandrajog
- Succeeded by: S. Ravindra Bhat
- In office 23 September 2019 – 5 October 2019
- Appointed by: Ram Nath Kovind
- Preceded by: S. Ravindra Bhat
- Succeeded by: Indrajit Mahanty

Personal details
- Born: 25 May 1960 (age 66) Sujangarh, Churu, Rajasthan
- Education: B.Com, M.Com and LL.B
- Alma mater: University of Rajasthan

Justice Mohammad Rafiq (born 25 May 1960) is a retired Indian judge. He is a former Chief Justice of Madhya Pradesh High Court, Orissa High Court, Himachal Pradesh High Court, and Meghalaya High Court and also a former judge of Rajasthan High Court. Twice, he served as the Acting Chief Justice of Rajasthan High Court. He also served as the Chancellor (ex-officio) of Orissa National Law University, Cuttack, National Law University, Bhopal, Dharamshastra National Law University, Jabalpur and Himachal Pradesh National Law University, Shimla.

== Early life ==
Rafiq was born in Sujangarh of Churu district in Indian state of Rajasthan. He earned bachelor's degree from G.H.S. Govt. PG College, Sujangarh affiliated to Rajasthan University in 1980. Then, he continued to study Bachelor of Legislative Law (LLB) and received the LLB degree in 1984. He started his career as an advocate shortly after getting LLB degree. He continued to study further and got the master's degree in 1986.

== Career ==
Rafiq started his career as advocate in 1984 in Rajasthan High Court Jaipur and was later appointed as assistant government advocate on 15 July 1986 and was promoted as Deputy Government Advocate on 22 December 1987. He was appointed as Central Government Standing Counsel in 1992. He was appointed Additional Advocate General of the state of Rajasthan on 7 January 1999. On 15th May 2006, Rafiq was appointed a Judge of Rajasthan High Court, he has also served as Acting Chief Justice of Rajasthan High Court twice.

Rafiq was appointed a Chief Justice of Meghalaya High Court on 13 November 2019. He was transferred from Meghalaya High Court to Orissa High Court as the 31st Chief Justice of Orissa High Court and took oath on 27 April 2020. He was then transferred as Chief Justice of Madhya Pradesh High Court on 31 December 2020 and took oath on 3 January 2021. He was transferred as Chief Justice of Himachal Pradesh High Court on 9 October 2021 and took oath on 14 October 2021. He retired on 24 May 2022.
