= Ajay Kumar Mittal =

25th Former Chief Justice of Madhya Pradesh High Court

Hon'ble Retd. Chief Justice Ajay Kumar Mittal
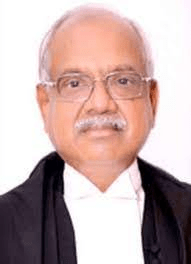

25th Chief Justice of Madhya Pradesh High Court
- In office 3 November 2019 – 29 September 2020
- Nominated by: Ranjan Gogoi
- Appointed by: Ram Nath Kovind
- Preceded by: S. K. Seth; R. S. Jha (acting); Sanjay Yadav (acting)
- Succeeded by: Mohammad Rafiq; Sanjay Yadav (acting)

7th Chief Justice of Meghalaya High Court
- In office 28 May 2019 – 2 November 2019
- Nominated by: Ranjan Gogoi
- Appointed by: Ram Nath Kovind
- Preceded by: M. Y. Mir
- Succeeded by: Mohammad Rafiq; H. S. Thangkhiew (acting)

Judge of Punjab and Haryana High Court
- In office 9 January 2004 – 27 May 2019
- Nominated by: V. N. Khare
- Appointed by: A. P. J. Abdul Kalam
- Acting Chief Justice
- In office 4 May 2018 – 2 June 2018
- Appointed by: Ram Nath Kovind
- Preceded by: S. J. Vazifdar
- Succeeded by: Krishna Murari

Personal details
- Born: 30 September 1958 (age 67) Chandigarh
- Education: B.Com and LL.B
- Alma mater: Shri Ram College of Commerce, Faculty of Law, University of Delhi

Ajay Kumar Mittal (born 30 September 1958) is a retired Indian judge. He is a former Chief Justice of Madhya Pradesh High Court and Meghalaya High Court and former judge of Punjab and Haryana High Court.

== Early life ==
He was born on 30 September 1958 at Chandigarh. In 1977 he passed B.Com. (Hons.) from Shri Ram College of Commerce, and did his LL.B from Faculty of Law, University of Delhi in 1980. In the same year he enrolled as an Advocate with the Bar Council of Punjab and Haryana and started practice in the Punjab and Haryana High Court in July 1980.

== Career ==
He was elevated as judge of Punjab and Haryana High Court on 9 January 2004. He served as the Acting Chief Justice of Punjab and Haryana High Court from 4 May 2018 to 2 June 2018.

In June 2017 it was reported that supreme court collegium led by CJI J. S. Khehar recommended him to be appointed as chief justice of Delhi High Court superseding Justice S. S. Saron who was two years senior to him but however recommendation did not move forward. Meanwhile Justice Saron retired in September 2017 and in January 2018 he himself was superseded by Justice Surya Kant, though elevated on same day but junior to Mittal, who was recommended to be appointed as chief justice of Himachal Pradesh High Court by newly constituted supreme court collegium headed by CJI Dipak Misra. He was further superseded by Justice Kant for elevation to Supreme Court of India.

He was finally appointed as the Chief Justice of Meghalaya High Court and took oath on 28 May 2019. He was transferred as the Chief Justice of Madhya Pradesh High Court for his final year, and he took oath on 3 November 2019. He retired on 29 September 2020.
