= P. V. Dixit =

Indian judge (1907-1986)

Hon'ble Chief Justice (Retd.) Purushottam Vinayak Dixit
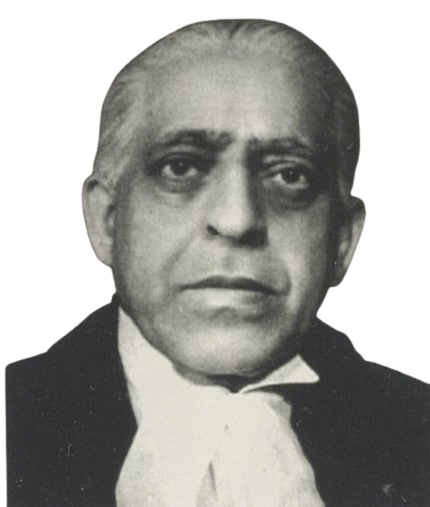

1st Lokayukta of Madhya Pradesh
- In office February 1982 – 8 March 1986
- Appointed by: Bhagwat Dayal Sharma
- Preceded by: Position established
- Succeeded by: G. P. Singh

Chairman, 9th Law Commssion of India
- In office 1979–1980
- Appointed by: Neelam Sanjiva Reddy
- Prime Minister: Morarji Desai
- Preceded by: H. R. Khanna (8th)
- Succeeded by: K. K. Mathew (10th)

3rd Chief Justice of Madhya Pradesh High Court
- In office 22 September 1959 – 18 March 1969
- Nominated by: Sudhi Ranjan Das
- Appointed by: Rajendra Prasad
- Preceded by: Ganesh Prasad Bhutt
- Succeeded by: Bishambhar Dayal

Judge of Madhya Pradesh High Court
- In office 1 November 1956 – 21 September 1959
- Appointed by: Rajendra Prasad

Chief Justice of Madhya Bharat High Court
- In office 1 October 1956 – 31 October 1956
- Appointed by: Rajendra Prasad
- Succeeded by: Position abolished

Judge of Madhya Bharat High Court
- In office 26 January 1950 – 30 September 1956
- Appointed by: Rajendra Prasad

Chief Justice of Gwalior High Court
- In office 1946 – 25 January 1950
- Succeeded by: Position abolished

Judge of Gwalior High Court
- In office 1945 - 1946
- In office 1941 - 1942

Personal details
- Born: 19 March 1907 Nagpur, Central Provinces (present day in Maharashtra)
- Died: 8 March 1986 (aged 78)
- Education: Nagpur University (B.Sc), Christ's College, Cambridge (LL.B)

Purushottam Vinayak Dixit (19 March 1907 - 8 March 1986) was 1st Lokayukta of Madhya Pradesh and the 3rd Chief Justice of the Madhya Pradesh High Court from 1959 to 1969. He was also the acting Governor of Madhya Pradesh in February 1966.

== Early life ==
Dixit was born into renowned family of lawyers on 19 March 1907 in Nagpur, Central Provinces. His father and uncles were barristers, thus giving him insights of law since childhood. The famous Rajaram Library of Nagpur was established in the memory of his grandfather Rajaram Dixit. He completed his initial schooling at Patwardhan High School at Nagpur and B.Sc from Nagpur University. He joined Christ's College, Cambridge for completing LL.B.

== Career ==
He was called to Bar in 1931 and upon return to India, started practising in Nagpur High Court but in 1939, shifted to Gwalior High Court in response to the call from Maharajah of Gwalior. He joined Gwalior State Judicial services in 1940 as district and sessions judge. He became judge of Gwalior High Court in 1941 for a brief period. Again was made Judge of Gwalior High Court in 1945 and subsequently became its Chief Justice in 1946. Upon formation of Madhya Bharat High Court on 26 January 1950, Gwalior High Court ceased to exist and all of its judges including Chief Justice were transferred as judge of newly established Madhya Bharat High Court. He was appointed as Chief Justice of Madhya Bharat High Court on 1 October 1956. Shortly thereafter upon the reorganization of states Madhya Bharat High Court too ceased to exist and all of its judges including Chief Justice Dixit were again transferred as Puisne Judges of new Madhya Pradesh High Court. On 22 September 1959 he was appointed as Chief Justice of Madhya Pradesh High Court and served as such until his retirement on 18 March 1969 making him the longest serving Chief Justice of Madhya Pradesh High Court till date.

== Post retirement ==
He was President of Prize Court, Bombay, and later served as Chairman of the Madhya Pradesh State Law Commission and also later became the Chairman of the 9th Law Commission of India in 1979. He worked as such till 1980 and in this short span of time, he produced 72 reports for Law Ministry. After his tenure in Law Commission of India was over in 1980, he was appointed as the first Lokayukta of Madhya Pradesh in February 1982 for a term of five years. Unfortunately he died on 8 March 1986 before completing his full five year tenure as lokayukta.

== See also ==
- List of governors of Madhya Pradesh
