= G. P. Singh =

Indian judge (1922–2013)

Hon'ble Chief Justice (Retd.) Guru Prasanna Singh
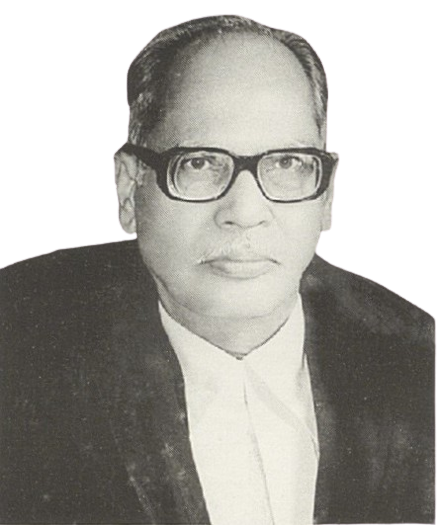

2nd Lokayukta of Madhya Pradesh
- In office 30 March 1992 – 29 March 1997
- Appointed by: M. A. Khan
- Preceded by: P. V. Dixit
- Succeeded by: Faizanuddin

Chairman of Law Commission, Madhya Pradesh
- In office 1990–1992
- Appointed by: M. A. Khan

8th Chief Justice of Madhya Pradesh High Court
- In office 27 July 1978 – 3 January 1984
- Nominated by: Neelam Sanjiva Reddy
- Appointed by: Y. V. Chandrachud
- Preceded by: Ananda Prakash Sen
- Succeeded by: Goverdhan Lal Oza

Judge of Madhya Pradesh High Court
- In office 7 November 1967 – 26 July 1978; Acting CJ : 17 July 1978 - 26 July 1978
- Nominated by: K. N. Wanchoo
- Appointed by: Zakir Husain

Personal details
- Born: 3 January 1922 Rewa, Madhya Pradesh
- Died: 5 October 2013 (aged 91)
- Education: M.Sc and LL.B
- Alma mater: Central Hindu School, Banaras Hindu University

Guru Prasanna Singh (3 January 1922 – 5 October 2013) was an Indian judge and the 8th Chief Justice of the Madhya Pradesh High Court from 1978 to 1984. He was the acting Governor of Madhya Pradesh briefly twice, in 1981 and 1983. Later, he was the chairman, Madhya Pradesh Law Commission from 1990 to 1992 and the Lokayukt, of Madhya Pradesh from 1992 to 1997.

== Life and career ==
Singh was born on 3 January 1922 in a village of Raipur Karchulian in Rewa district, Madhya Pradesh. He completed his schooling from Central Hindu School at Varanasi and college education from Banaras Hindi University. He obtained his Master of Science in 1941 by securing top position in the merit list. Thereafter, he earned his Law degree in 1944 from BHU. He practiced in Rewa Judicial Commissioner's Court and Rewa High Court, High court for Vindhya Pradesh till 1956. After the reorganization of the States, he shifted to Jabalpur to join the Madhya Pradesh High Court Bar. He served as a lecturer in law in the Government Law College at Rewa from 1948 till he shifted to Jabalpur. He also had been legal advisor to the University of Jabalpur. His publication "Principles of Statutory Interpretation" is valuable addition to law literature.

== As Judge ==
He took oath as the additional Judge of the Madhya Pradesh High Court on 7 November 1967 and later on appointed as permanent Judge on 29 July 1968. He was appointed as the acting chief justice of Madhya Pradesh High Court on 17 July 1978 due to elevation of the then chief justice Ananda Prakash Sen to Supreme Court of India and immediately appointed as permanent chief justice on 27 July 1978. During his tenure as Chief Justice of Madhya Pradesh High Court, he twice functioned as acting Governor of Madhya Pradesh, first - from 26 May 1981 to 9 July 1981 and thereafter from 21 September 1983 to 7 October 1983. He demitted the office of Chief Justice of Madhya Pradesh High Court on 3 January 1984. After retirement he was appointed as the Chairman, Madhya Pradesh Law Commission from 1990 to 1992 and thereafter as Lokayukta of Madhya Pradesh from 30 March 1992 to 29 March 1997.

In 2014, Markandey Katju stirred row by claiming that justice Singh was denied elevation to Supreme Court of India because he denied recommending names of advocates to be appointed as judges, which was sent by the then law minister.

He died on 5 October 2013.

== See also ==
- List of governors of Madhya Pradesh
