= Purushaindra Kumar Kaurav =

Judge of the Delhi High Court
- Incumbent
- Assumed office 2 June 2022
- Appointed by: President of India

Judge of the Madhya Pradesh High Court
- In office 8 October 2021 – 1 June 2022
- Appointed by: President of India

Advocate General of Madhya Pradesh
- In office 2017–2018

Personal details
- Born: October 4, 1976 (age 50) India
- Education: N.E.S. College, Jabalpur
- Occupation: Judge

Purushaindra Kumar Kaurav (born 4 October 1976) is an Indian judge who has served as a judge of the Delhi High Court since 2022. He previously served as a judge of the Madhya Pradesh High Court and was the Advocate General of Madhya Pradesh.

== See also ==
- Delhi High Court
- Madhya Pradesh High Court
