= Sanjay Yadav (judge) =

Former Chief Justice of Allahabad High Court

Hon'ble Chief Justice (Retd.) Sanjay Yadav

Member of Lokpal of India
- Incumbent
- Assumed office 12 March 2024
- Appointed by: Droupadi Murmu
- Chairperson: Ajay Manikrao Khanwilkar

47th Chief Justice of Allahabad High Court
- In office 13 June 2021 – 25 June 2021
- Nominated by: N. V. Ramana
- Appointed by: Ram Nath Kovind
- Preceded by: Govind Mathur
- Succeeded by: Rajesh Bindal

Judge of Allahabad High Court
- In office 8 January 2021 – 13 April 2021; Acting CJ : 14 April 2021 - 12 June 2021
- Nominated by: S. A. Bobde
- Appointed by: Ram Nath Kovind

Judge of Madhya Pradesh High Court
- In office 2 March 2007 – 7 January 2021; Acting CJ : 20 September 2020 - 3 January 2021; 7 October 2019 - 2 November 2019
- Nominated by: K. G. Balakrishnan
- Appointed by: A. P. J. Abdul Kalam

Personal details
- Born: 26 June 1959 (age 66) Jabalpur, Madhya Pradesh, India

Justice Sanjay Yadav (born 26 June 1959) is a retired Indian judge and currently serving as Judicial member of Lokpal of India. He is a former Chief Justice of the Allahabad High Court. He has served as acting Chief Justice of the Allahabad High Court and Madhya Pradesh High Court. He has also served as a judge of the Allahabad High Court and Madhya Pradesh High Court.

== Career ==
Born on 6 June 1959. Enrolled as an Advocate on 25 August 1986. He practiced on Civil, Revenue and Constitutional side in the Madhya Pradesh High Court. He was appointed Deputy Advocate General of Madhya Pradesh. He was elevated as Additional Judge of Madhya Pradesh High Court on 2 March 2007 and Permanent on 15 January 2010. He was appointed Acting Chief Justice of Madhya Pradesh High Court with effect from 6 October 2019 to 2 November 2019 and from 30 September 2020 to 2 January 2021. He was transferred as Judge of Allahabad High Court on 8 January 2021. Appointed Acting Chief Justice of Allahabad High Court on 14 April 2021. He was appointed Chief Justice of Allahabad High Court on 10 June 2021 and took oath on 13 June 2021. He retired on 25 June 2021. In, March 2024 he was appointed as a Judicial member of Lokpal where he will serve until March 2029.
