= Prem Narayan Singh =

Hon'ble Justice Prem Narayan Singh

Judge of the Madhya Pradesh High Court
- Incumbent
- Assumed office 1 May 2023

Personal details
- Born: 14 August 1963 (age 62)
- Occupation: Judge
- Profession: Law

Justice Prem Narayan Singh (born 14 August 1963) is a judge at the Madhya Pradesh High Court in India. He was appointed to this position on 1 May 2023.
