= Vishal Dhagat =

Hon'ble Justice Vishal Dhagat

Judge of the Madhya Pradesh High Court
- Incumbent
- Assumed office 27 May 2019

Personal details
- Born: 14 December 1969 (age 56) Dibrugarh, Assam, India
- Education: Venkateswara College, Delhi University
- Occupation: Judge
- Profession: Law

Justice Vishal Dhagat (born 14 December 1969) is an Indian judge serving on the Madhya Pradesh High Court since 27 May 2019.

== Early life and education ==
Dhagat was born on 14 December 1969 in Dibrugarh, Assam. He completed his Bachelor of Arts (Honours) in History from Venkateswara College from Delhi University, in 1990. After he pursued his Bachelor of Laws (LLB) from a law college recognized by Hari Singh Gour University, Sagar.
