= Vivek Agarwal (judge) =

Justice of Madhya Pradesh High Court

Hon'ble Justice Vivek Agarwal
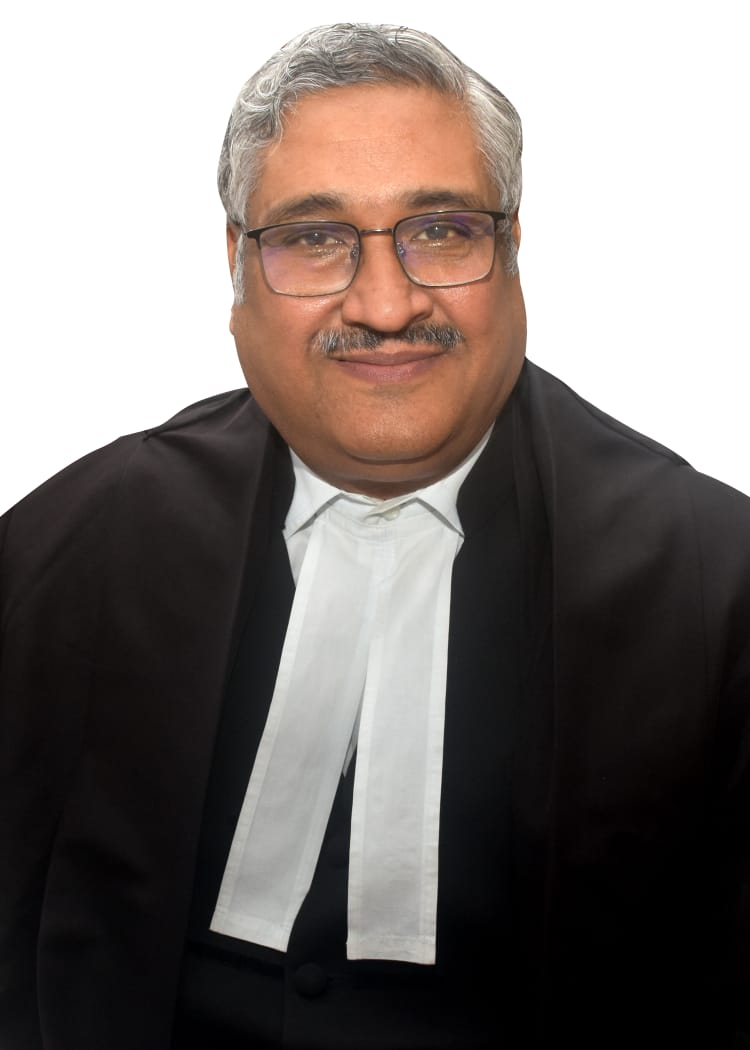
- Official portrait

Judge of the Madhya Pradesh High Court
- Incumbent
- Assumed office 7 April 2016

Personal details
- Born: 28 June 1967 (age 59)
- Occupation: Judge
- Profession: Law

Vivek Agarwal is a judge of the High Court of Madhya Pradesh, currently serving at the Principal Seat in Jabalpur. He is well-known in the Indian legal community for his strict courtroom decorum and viral judicial proceedings.
