= Shripathi Ravindra Bhat =

Indian judge (born 1958)

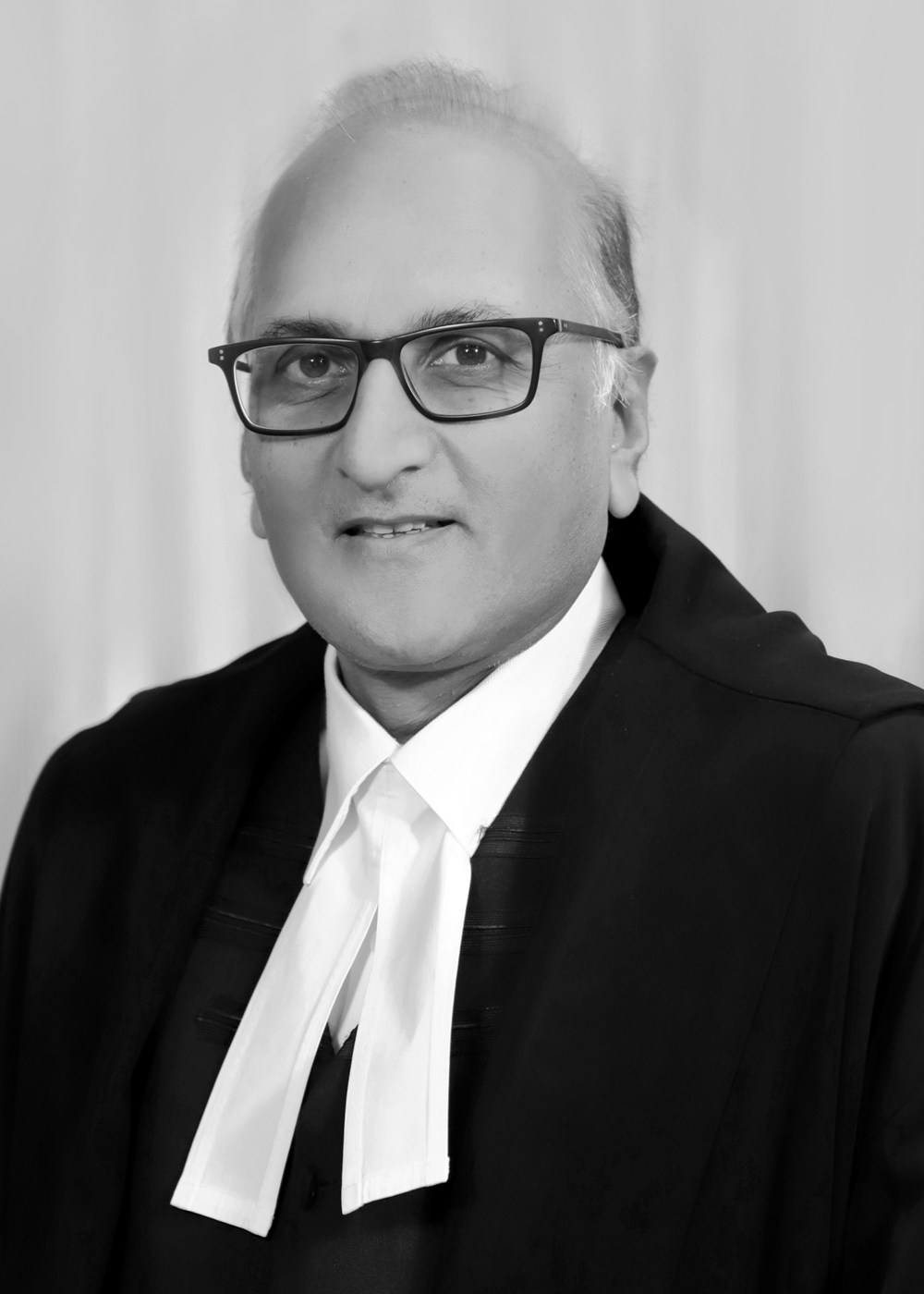

Judge of the Supreme Court of India
- In office 23 September 2019 – 20 October 2023
- Nominated by: Ranjan Gogoi
- Appointed by: Ram Nath Kovind

Chief Justice of the Rajasthan High Court
- In office 5 May 2019 – 22 September 2019
- Nominated by: Ranjan Gogoi
- Appointed by: Ram Nath Kovind
- Preceded by: Mohammad Rafiq (acting)

Judge of the Delhi High Court
- In office 16 July 2004 – 4 May 2019
- Nominated by: Ramesh Chandra Lahoti
- Appointed by: A. P. J. Abdul Kalam

Personal details
- Born: 21 October 1958 (age 67) Mysore, Mysore State, India
- Education: Delhi University

Shripathi Ravindra Bhat (born 21 October 1958) is a former judge of the Supreme Court of India, former chief justice of Rajasthan High Court and ex-judge of the Delhi High Court.

== Career ==
He was born on 21 October 1958 at Mysore. He was educated in Bangalore and Gwalior. He did his schooling from the Central School, Faridabad. He did Bachelor of Arts with honors in English literature from Hindu College, Delhi in 1979. He obtained his Bachelor of Laws degree from Campus Law Centre, Delhi University in 1982. In the same year, he was enrolled with Delhi Bar Council. He practiced before Delhi High Court and Supreme Court of India. He was elevated as an additional judge of Delhi High Court on 16 July 2004 and made permanent judge on 20 February 2006. He was elevated as chief justice of Rajasthan High Court on 5 May 2019. He was elevated as a judge of Supreme Court of India on 23 September 2019. Over the course of his Supreme Court tenure, Bhat authored 142 judgments.

== Notable judgements ==
In his tenure as a judge of the Delhi High Court, Bhat delivered some landmark judgements, particularly in the field of IPR, drug regulation and right to information. In Roche v Cipla, a request for an interim injunction by Roche was denied by Justice Bhat on the ground of public interest. The matter pertained to a claim of patent infringement by Roche against generic drug manufacturer Cipla. Going against the entrenched norm of routinely awarding interim injunctions in such matters, Justice Bhat refused injunction on the ground that such interference may lead to the public’s interest getting affected due to the huge price differential between Roche’s and Cipla’s drugs.

Another significant judgment from his stable is CPIO v Subhash Chandra Agarwal in which he held that the office of the Chief Justice of India is amenable to the provisions of the Right to Information Act. This matter was appealed to the Supreme Court, which ultimately agreed with Bhat’s High Court judgment, subject to certain conditions.

Throughout his career Justice Bhat has been a supporter of international arbitration: he was on the committee that founded the Delhi International Arbitration Centre in 2009, which he later chaired for three years, and was a member of the committee that recommended changes to India’s arbitration law in 2017, which resulted in Parliament amending the Arbitration and Conciliation Act in 2019 (introducing time limits for domestic arbitrations in India and entrenching arbitrators’ immunity).

Bhat was also part of the bench which upheld the constitutionality of the 2018 amendment to SC-ST(Prevention of Atrocities)Act, 1989. On February 10, 2020, the Court formally upheld the constitutionality of the 2018 Amendment. Justice Arun Mishra wrote the majority on behalf of himself and Justice Vineet Saran. Justice S.R. Bhat wrote a concurring opinion.
