= Frederick Louis Grille =

British India Judge

Frederick Louis Grille (18 December 1889 – 7 July 1968) was a British administrator and Judge in British India. He served as an officer in the Indian Civil Service (ICS) and became the Chief Justice of the Nagpur High Court.

== Career ==
Grille was educated at Harrow School and Jesus College, Cambridge. After completing his higher education, he passed the Indian Civil Service in 1912. Grille came to India in 1913 and held various judicial and civil positions. He became the Judge of Nagpur High Cour and after Justice Gilbert Stone, Grille was elevated to the post of Chief Justice of Nagpur High Court.
