= A. M. Khanwilkar =

Lokpal of India

Hon'ble Justice Ajay Manikrao Khanwilkar
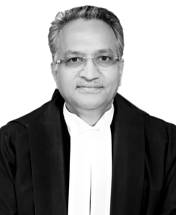

Chairperson of Lokpal of India
- Incumbent
- Assumed office 10 March 2024
- Appointed by: Droupadi Murmu
- Preceded by: Pradip Kumar Mohanty (additional charge)

Judge of Supreme Court of India
- In office 13 May 2016 – 29 July 2022
- Nominated by: T. S. Thakur
- Appointed by: Pranab Mukherjee

22nd Chief Justice of Madhya Pradesh High Court
- In office 24 November 2013 – 12 May 2016
- Nominated by: P. Sathasivam
- Appointed by: Pranab Mukherjee
- Preceded by: Sharad Arvind Bobde
- Succeeded by: Hemant Gupta

21st Chief Justice of Himachal Pradesh High Court
- In office 4 April 2013 – 23 November 2013
- Nominated by: Altamas Kabir
- Appointed by: Pranab Mukherjee
- Preceded by: Kurian Joseph
- Succeeded by: Mansoor Ahmad Mir

Judge of Bombay High Court
- In office 29 March 2000 – 3 April 2013
- Nominated by: Adarsh Sein Anand
- Appointed by: K. R. Narayanan

Personal details
- Born: 30 July 1957 (age 69) Poona, Bombay State, India
- Education: K C Law College, Mumbai, Mulund College of Commerce

Ajay Manikrao Khanwilkar (born 30 July 1957) is a former judge of the Supreme Court of India who is currently serving as the Chairperson of Lokpal of India. He has also served as the chief justice of the Madhya Pradesh High Court and Himachal Pradesh High Court and as a judge of the Bombay High Court.

== Career ==
Khanwilkar was enrolled as an advocate on 10 February 1982. He joined the chamber of Advocate Prafulachandra M Pradhan at Mulund. He practiced on civil, criminal and constitutional sides before the subordinate courts, tribunals and High Court of Judicature at Bombay on the appellate side and original side. He also practiced exclusively in the Supreme Court of India from July 1984.

He was appointed an additional judge of the Bombay High Court on 29 March 2000 and confirmed as permanent judge on 8 April 2002.

He was appointed chief justice of the High court of Himachal Pradesh on 4 April 2013. Thereafter he was appointed chief justice of the Madhya Pradesh High Court on 24 November 2013 and elevated to Supreme Court on 13 May 2016.

He retired from the Supreme Court on 29 July 2022 after being on the court for 6 years, 2 months and 17 days.

On 27 February 2024, he was appointed as the Chairperson of Lokpal of India. On 10 March 2024, President of India Droupadi Murmu administered him the oath of office.
