= Sanjay Kumar Seth =

Former Chief Justice of Madhya Pradesh High Court (1957–2021)

Honourable Retd. Chief Justice Sanjay Kumar Seth

Chief Justice of Madhya Pradesh High Court
- In office 14 November 2018 – 9 June 2019
- Nominated by: Ranjan Gogoi
- Appointed by: Ram Nath Kovind
- Preceded by: Hemant Gupta
- Succeeded by: Ravi Shankar Jha (acting)

Judge of Madhya Pradesh High Court
- In office 21 March 2003 – 13 November 2018
- Nominated by: V. N. Khare
- Appointed by: A. P. J. Abdul Kalam

Personal details
- Born: 10 June 1957 Madhya Pradesh
- Died: 30 April 2021 (aged 63)

Sanjay Kumar Seth (10 June 1957 – 30 April 2021) was an Indian judge and former Chief Justice of Madhya Pradesh High Court.

== Career ==
After passing B.A., LL.B., Seth was enrolled as an Advocate on 24 July 1981 and practised in Jabalpur on Civil and Constitutional matters. He served as an additional advocate general in the Madhya Pradesh High Court for the Government of Madhya Pradesh. Seth was appointed an additional Judge of Madhya Pradesh High Court on 21 March 2003 and was appointed Permanent Judge on 19 January 2004. He became the Acting Chief Justice of the Madhya Pradesh High Court after Justice Hemant Gupta's appointment to the Supreme Court of India. Justice Seth was appointed the Chief Justice of the same High Court on 14 November 2018.

== Death ==
Justice Seth died from COVID-19 on 30 April 2021.
