= J. S. Verma =

27th Chief Justice of India

Jagdish Sharan Verma
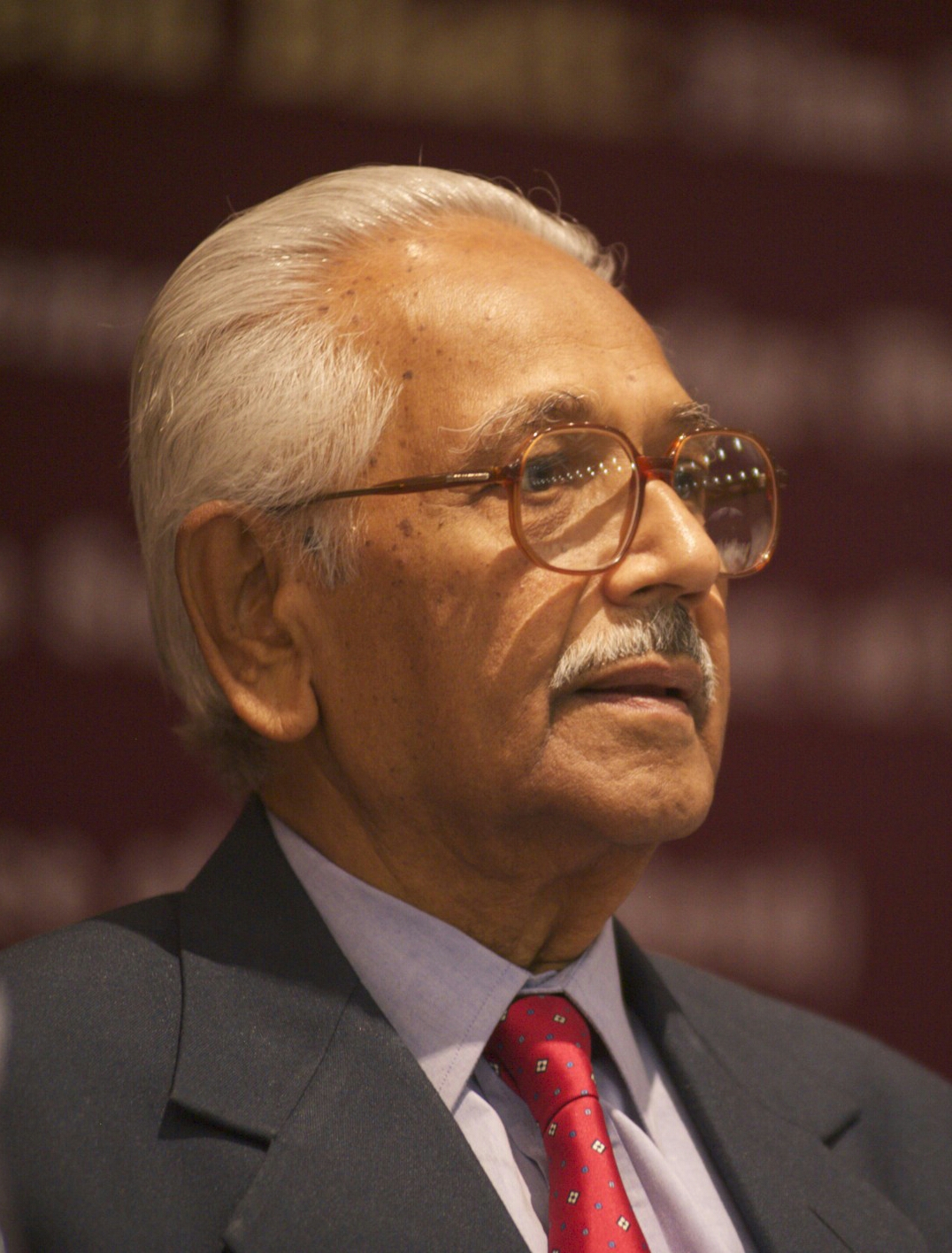
- Justice Verma in 2011

3rd Chairperson of National Human Rights Commission
- In office 4 November 1999 – 17 January 2003
- Appointed by: K. R. Narayanan
- Preceded by: M. N. Venkatachaliah
- Succeeded by: Adarsh Sein Anand

27th Chief Justice of India
- In office 25 March 1997 – 18 January 1998
- Appointed by: S. D. Sharma
- Preceded by: A. M. Ahmadi
- Succeeded by: M. M. Punchhi

Judge of Supreme Court of India
- In office 3 June 1989 - 24 March 1997
- Nominated by: R. S. Pathak
- Appointed by: R. Venkataraman

16th Chief Justice of Rajasthan High Court
- In office 1 September 1986 - 2 June 1989
- Nominated by: P. N. Bhagwati
- Appointed by: Zail Singh
- Preceded by: Dwarka Prasad Gupta; G. M. Lodha (acting)
- Succeeded by: K. C. Agarwal; M. C. Jain (acting)

10th Chief Justice of Madhya Pradesh High Court
- In office 14 June 1986 – 31 August 1986
- Nominated by: P. N. Bhagwati
- Appointed by: Zail Singh
- Preceded by: Goverdhan Lal Oza
- Succeeded by: Narayan Dutta Ojha; G. G. Sohani (acting)

Judge of Madhya Pradesh High Court
- In office 12 September 1972 – 13 June 1986; Acting CJ : 27 October 1985 - 13 June 1986
- Nominated by: Sarv Mittra Sikri
- Appointed by: V. V. Giri

Personal details
- Born: 18 January 1934 Satna, Central Provinces and Berar, British India
- Died: 22 April 2013 (aged 80) Gurgaon, Haryana, India
- Spouse: Pushpa
- Children: 2
- Education: Allahabad University (B.Sc and LL.B)

Jagdish Sharan Verma (18 January 1933 – 22 April 2013) was an Indian jurist who served as the 27th Chief Justice of India from 25 March 1997 to 18 January 1998. He was the chairman of the National Human Rights Commission from 1999 to 2003, and chairman of the Justice Verma Committee Report on Amendments to Criminal Law after the 2012 Delhi gang rape case. He remains one of India's most highly regarded Chief Justices and eminent jurists in its history.

He was known for his judicial innovation through landmark judgements, which made him "the face of judicial activism" in India. His decisions were credited with the forging of powerful new judicial tools such as continuing mandamus, and the expanded protection of fundamental rights as in the Vishaka Judgement. Alongside judicial activism and fundamental rights protection, he was strongly associated with women's empowerment, probity in public life, judicial accountability, as well as enhancing social justice.

As Chief Justice of India, he also administered oath of office to 10th President of India K. R. Narayanan.

== Early life, education and family ==
Jagdish Sharan Verma was born in a Kayastha family in Satna, Madhya Pradesh. He had six brothers and three sisters. He completed his early education at Venkat High School in Satna (Govt. Venkat H.S. Excellence School No.1, Satna), followed by Government Jubilee Intercollege, Lucknow. He graduated from the University of Allahabad with a B.Sc. and LL.B.

He had two daughters with his wife, Pushpa.

== High Court ==
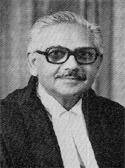
Justice J.S. Verma in 1989

Verma began his legal career in 1955, and enrolled as an advocate in the Madhya Pradesh High Court in August 1959. He was appointed as a judge there in June 1972. In the following year, he delivered a judgment arguing that a juvenile convicted of murder ought to be tried under separate procedures from an adult. This went on to form the basis for the Juvenile Justice Act in 1986.

After the declaration of state of emergency in India, he was one of the first judges to reject the government's proclamation that the emergency took precedence over rights to life and liberty. Before the Supreme Court stopped High Courts from entertaining habeas corpus petitions, Verma "stood out" as one of the few high court judges who released detainees arrested under the Maintenance of Internal Security Act.

He became Chief Justice of Madhya Pradesh High Court in June 1985 and also served as Chief Justice of Rajasthan High Court from September 1986 until his elevation to the Supreme Court in June 1989. He acted as the Governor of Rajasthan twice between 1986 and 1989.

== Supreme Court ==
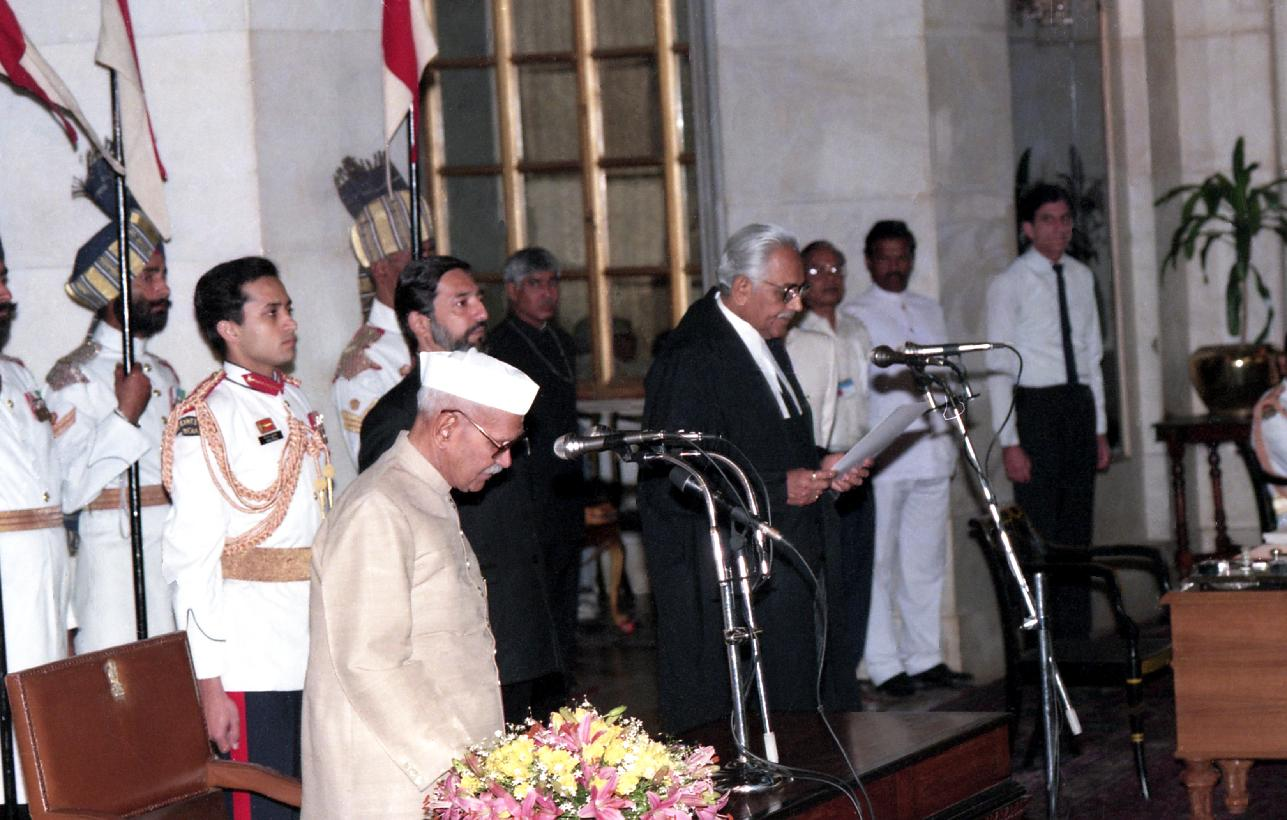
Indian President Shankar Dayal Sharma administers oath to Justice J. S. Verma as Chief Justice of India, at Rashtrapati Bhavan in New Delhi

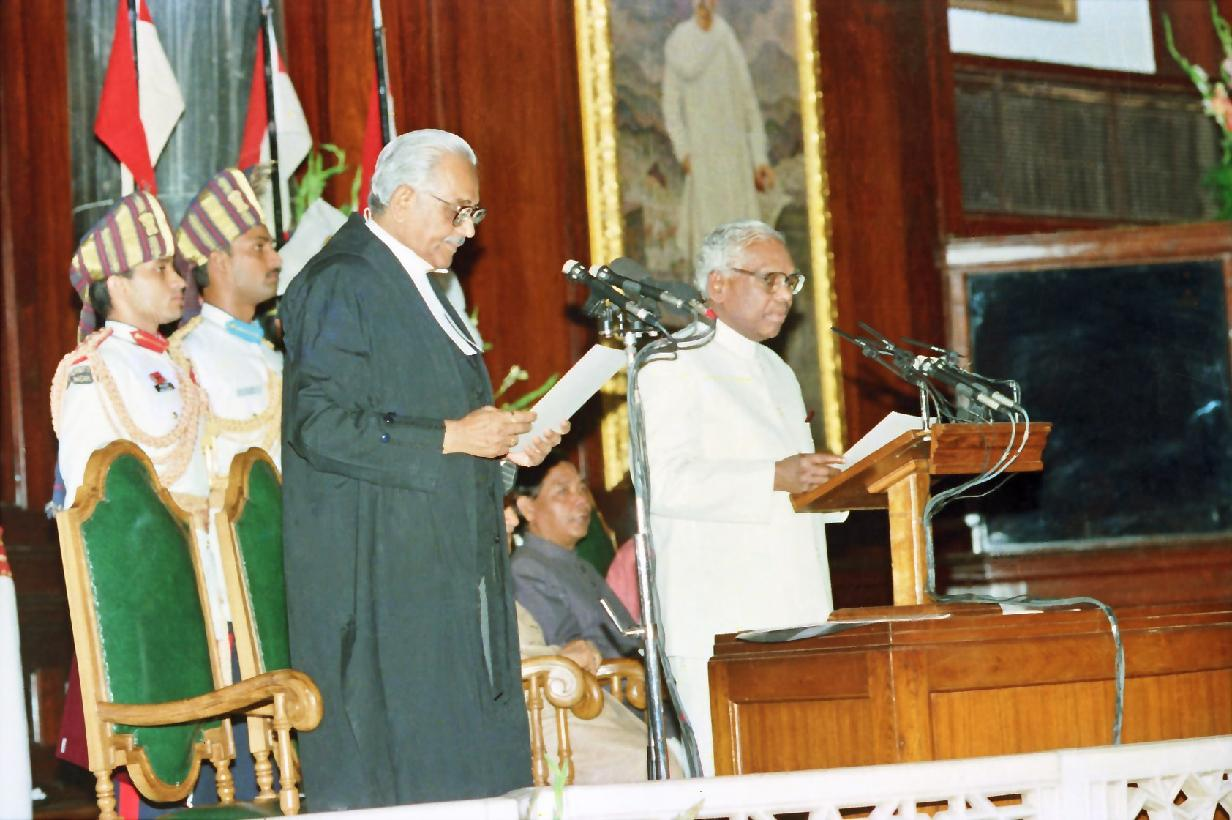
K. R. Narayanan being sworn in as the President of India. by J. S. Verma, 1997

In June 1989, he was appointed Judge of the Supreme Court of India, and became Chief Justice of India in January 1998. During his time in the Supreme Court, Justice Verma gave numerous landmark judgments. Over the course of his Supreme Court tenure, Verma authored 149 judgments and sat on 639 benches.

=== Most notable cases ===
==== Kumari Shrileka Vidyarthi etc. Vs. State of U.P. & Ors. ====
The state terminated the appointment of all government counsel irrespective of whether the term of the incumbent had expired or not. At the same time, the government directed preparation of fresh panels to make appointments in the place of existing incumbents. The court strongly asserted the requirement that every state action must not be arbitrary even if that state action was in the field of contractual relations between the state and individuals. Justice Verma stated that the basic requirement of Article 14 in the Constitution of India is fairness in action by the state. It is difficult to accept that the state can be permitted to act otherwise in any field of its activity, irrespective of the nature of its function. This requirement must be satisfied by every action of the state or an instrumental body of the state in order for it to be valid.

==== K Veeraswami vs. Union of India ====
A petition was filed by a former high court chief justice in the Supreme Court, arguing that he could not be proceeded against under the Prevention of Corruption Act of 1947. This was on the basis that he was not a public servant for the purposes of the Prevention of Corruption Act. The majority of the Supreme Court held that a former Chief Justice of the High Court of Madras could be proceeded against under the Act. This was on the basis that a judge belonging to the higher judiciary was a public servant for the purposes of the Act.

Justice Verma dissented, saying that Parliament had not intended a member of the higher judiciary to be designated a 'public servant' for the purposes of the Prevention of Corruption Act as amended. Justice Verma recognised the need for an appropriate mechanism to deal with corruption by members of the higher judiciary but stated that the difference is between the law as it is and the law as it should be. He said that "judicial activism can supply the deficiencies and fill gaps in an already existing structure found deficient in some ways, but it must stop short of building a new edifice where there is none." The majority position would also prove problematic to the principles of independence of the judiciary and the constitutional scheme of the hierarchy of the courts.

==== Smt. Nilabati Behera Vs. State of Orissa & Ors ====
A mother of a 22-year-old man who had died in police custody wrote a letter to the Supreme Court which the court treated as a writ petition. A Rs 1.5 lakh compensation was awarded by the Supreme Court to the mother, as Justice Verma held that compensation was a public law remedy distinct from and in addition to the private law remedy in tort for damages. Justice Verma stated that the award of compensation in a proceeding under Article 32 of the Constitution of India or by the High Court under Article 226 of the Constitution of India is a public law remedy which is based on strict liability for the breach of fundamental rights.

Justice Verma argued that the principle of sovereign immunity does not apply as a defence in relation to compensation as a public law remedy, even though it may be available as a defence in a private law action based on tort. Justice Verma stated that compensation is an acknowledged constitutional remedy for enforcement and protection of fundamental rights. The award of monetary compensation is a justifiable remedy when it is the only practical method of redress available for contraventions of fundamental rights by the state or its servants in the purported exercise of its powers. The Supreme Court relied on Article 9 (5) of the International Covenant on Civil and Political Rights as an additional ground in order to award compensation as a mode of enforcement of the fundamental 'right to life' when no other mode of enforcement was available.

==== The Second Judges Case ====
The Second Judges Case (Advocates-On-Record Association & Ors. v. Union of India 3) was the foundation for the collegium system for the appointment of the judiciary in India. The court held that the executive and the judiciary are to reach their decision together, given that both have a vital role in the joint venture. It is only if there is an irresolvable disagreement between them which cannot be resolved by joint effort that the Chief Justice of India would have primacy. It was only in this situation that the question of primacy should arise.

This was on the basis that the opinion of the Chief Justice of India is formed collectively after taking into account the views of his senior colleagues who are required to be consulted by him.

In the First Judges Case (S. P Gupta et al. v Union of India et al.), the majority took the view that the opinion of the judiciary does not have primacy in the matter of appointments of judges of the Supreme Court and High Courts. The primacy is with the central government, which is to take the decision after consulting all the constitutional functionaries. The central government is not bound to act in accordance with the opinion of all the constitutional functionaries consulted even if their opinion is the same.

In the Second Judges case, the court felt that the approach in the First Judges case threatened the principles of independence of the judiciary and the separation of powers with danger of the politicisation of judicial appointments. The court also felt that this approach potentially minimised the role of the judiciary in appointments when the judiciary would have best knowledge of the legal calibre and acumen of potential appointees in comparison to the executive.

==== S.R. Bommai v. Union of India ====
This case related to a presidential proclamation issued under Section 356 (1) of the Emergency Provisions of the Constitution of India dissolving the Karnataka Legislative Assembly. Article 365 of the Indian Constitution empowers the President of India, on his being satisfied that, "a situation has arisen" in which the state government cannot be carried on in accordance with the provisions of the Constitution to take action. This enables the state to come under the direct control of the central government.

The court held that whilst it could review whether a proclamation which imposed the president's rule was ultra vires, under Article 356 the scope of such review would be limited. There was a narrow area which was justiciable by the court with deference awarded to the decision of the executive. This was on the basis that the exercise of the power of proclamation was a political one with a wide area of discretion which would often involve a great deal of political judgment. It is difficult to evolve judicially manageable norms on the basis of which to scrutinise decisions which are often highly subjective and based on a wide array of socio-political and economic factors. Justice Verma stated that only cases which permit application of totally objective standards for deciding whether the constitutional machinery has failed are amenable to judicial review and the remaining cases where there is any significant area of subjective satisfaction are not justiciable because of a lack of judicially manageable standards for resolving the controversy. The latter cases are subject only to political scrutiny i.e. through elections.

==== Ayodhya Judgement ====
The Ayodhya Judgement is formally known as Dr. M Ismail Furuqui vs Union of India. After the demolition of Babri Masjid the disputed area had been acquired and was under the control of the central government until the adjudication of the dispute in relation to the property. The Court struck down provisions which diminished the pending suits in relation to this disputed property without providing an alternative judicial mechanism for deciding the legal dispute. The provisions through which the property came to be acquired by the centre were upheld.

The Supreme Court elucidated the meaning of Indian secularism in this case, stating:

it is clear from the constitutional scheme that it guarantees equality in the matter of religion to all individuals and groups irrespective of their faith emphasising that there is no religion of the state itself. The Preamble of the Constitution read in particular with Articles 25 to 28 emphasises this aspect and indicates that it is in this manner the concept of secularism embodied in the Constitutional scheme as a creed adopted by the Indian people has to be understood whilst examining the constitutional validity of any legislation on the touchstone of the Constitution. The concept of secularism is one facet of the right to equality woven as the central golden thread in the fabric depicting the pattern of the scheme in the Constitution.

==== Jamaat-e-Islami Hind vs. Union of India ====
In this case, Justice Verma upheld the principles of natural justice and judicial protections of freedom of association, freedom of expression under the Indian Constitution in the face of strong political pressure.

At a public meeting held in Delhi on 27 May 1990, the Jamaat-e-Islami Hind had held that the separation of Kashmir from India was inevitable. On 1 August 1991, the organization had also demanded that the Government of India hold a plebiscite in Kashmir to determine whether the people of that province wish to remain in India or secede. Viewing these acts as constituting clear-cut sedition, the Government of India exercised the powers conferred on it by Section 3 (1) of the Unlawful Activities (Prevention) Act to ban the Jamaat-e-Islami Hind, declaring it an unlawful association because had been carrying out unlawful activities. Later, a tribunal order endorsed this notification.

The court headed by Justice set aside the order of the tribunal, which had endorsed the government notification, and lifted the ban on the Jamaat-e-Islami Hind. The court did this on purely technical grounds, observing that the tribunal had erred in accepting the government's plea that sensitive intelligence inputs are 'classified' and cannot be disclosed in court. Justice Verma stated that the tribunal could not have made the necessary subjective judgment in that case as it may or may not have known all the facts. The court said that the tribunal needed to decide whether the material in support of the ban outweighed the material against it on the basis of 'greater probabilities,' a term coined by Justice Verma and never actually explained. In this process, the requirement of natural justice had to be satisfied taking into account the public interest. This would require the tribunal to have access to all the necessary information from both sides to carry out judicial scrutiny. Since this did not happen, the order of the tribunal was set aside. In this way, Justice Verma managed to deliver a judgment in favor of religious minorities and in opposition to the government, even though the facts were in favour of the government, by taking recourse to technical grounds and without making any subjective assessment of the charge of sedition, which may have required him to deliver exactly the converse judgment.

==== Hindutva Judgement ====
The Hindutva Judgment (R.Y. Prabhoo vs P.K. Kunte 11 December 1995) is one of Justice Verma's most controversial judgments, which he believed was widely misunderstood.

The Bombay High Court had given a judgment against the election of Dr. R.Y Prabhoo (Shiv Sena) declaring his election void on the ground that he had been found guilty of corrupt practices under Subsections 3 and 3A of Section 123 of the Representation of the People Act 1951. This provides that candidates are prohibited from eliciting votes or persuading people not to vote on the grounds of his religion, race, caste, community or language or the use of or appeal to religious symbols. It also prohibits the promotion of or attempt to promote feelings of enmity or hatred between different classes of the citizens of India on the grounds of religion, race, caste, community or language.

The issue related to three speeches given by Bal Thakeray in the election campaign for Dr. Prabhoo which the High Court held had used intemperate language and were incendiary in nature. The High Court also found that the speeches tended to promote enmity and hatred between the different classes of India on the grounds of religion and were appeals to vote for Dr. Prabhoo because of his religion as a Hindu.

The Supreme Court stated that:

It is a fallacy and an error of law to proceed on the assumption that any reference to Hindutva or Hinduism in a speech makes it automatically a speech based on Hindu religion as opposed to other religions or that the use of the word Hindutva or Hinduism per se depicts an attitude hostile to all persons practising any religion other than the Hindu religion... and it may well be that these words are used in a speech to emphasise the way of life of the Indian people and the Indian cultural ethos...There is no such presumption permissible in law contrary to the several Constitution Bench decisions.

This was on the basis that 'Hindu', 'Hinduism' and 'Hindutva' are often very wide terms meaning reference to them cannot be subject to a blanket ban. Rather, the context and meaning has to be gauged in the individual speeches in question.

==== Supreme Court revisits the Hindutva Judgement ====
The Supreme Court, while revisiting the two-decade-old Hindutva judgement, has said that nobody should be allowed to misuse religion for electoral gains and has termed it as a 'corrupt practice'. However, Supreme Court declined a plea to check the “devastating consequences” of its 1995 judgment defining Hindutva as a "way of life" and nothing to do with "narrow fundamentalist Hindu religious bigotry".

==== Vishaka Judgement ====
The Vishakha and others v State of Rajasthan (13 September 1997) is considered one of the world's landmark judgments in gender justice. It was brought as a class action by certain NGO's and social activists following the brutal gang rape of a social worker in Rajasthan to enforce the fundamental rights of working women under Articles 14, 19 and 21 of the Constitution of India. The Supreme Court laid down guidelines to deal with the menace of sexual harassment at the workplace through an approach based on equal access, prevention, and empowerment. This approach was the foundation for national and international best practice in dealing with sexual harassment at the workplace.

Justice Verma held that each incident of sexual harassment constitutes a violation of the fundamental rights of 'gender equality', 'right to life and liberty' and the right to practice any profession or to carry out any occupation, trade or business under Article 19 (1) (g) of the Constitution of India which depends on a safe working environment. Vishaka vs State of Rajasthan is also a seminal and definitive judgment in the field of constitutional jurisprudence and the relationship between international law and domestic law. The court held that in the absence of domestic legislation addressing this issue the court would rely on India's obligations under international treaties and agreements to fill the gaps in the law. "Any International Convention not inconsistent with fundamental rights and in harmony with its spirit must be read into Articles 14, 15, 19 (1) (g) and 21 of the Constitution to enlarge the meaning and content thereof, to promote the object of the constitutional guarantee."

==== AFSPA Judgment ====
The Supreme Court of India in this case upheld the constitutional validity of the Armed Forces Special Powers Act which grants the armed forces special powers in "disturbed areas". Concerns have been raised about the Act on the basis that it grants impunity for human rights violations.

The Supreme Court of India, in this case, clearly stipulated that the following provisions must be read into the AFSPA:

Ensure that troop under command do not harass innocent people, destroy property of the public or unnecessarily enter into the house/dwelling of people not connected with any unlawful activities. Ensure that women are not searched/arrested without the presence of female police. In fact, women should be searched by female police only. Do not ill treat anyone, in particular women and children, no harassment of civilians, no torture."

The Supreme Court held that "the instructions in the form of do's and don't's have to be treated as binding instructions which are required to be followed by the members of the armed forces exercising powers under the Central Act and a serious note should be taken of violation of the instructions and the persons found responsible for such violations should be suitably punished under the Army Act of 1950." The court also then pointed out that there are safeguards within the powers exercisable under the Act. Parliament included these safeguards to check the arbitrary exercise of power by the armed forces.

The Supreme Court went on to state that:

In order that the people may feel assured that there is an effective check against misuse or abuse of powers by the members of the armed forces it is necessary that a complaint containing an allegation about misuse or abuse of the powers conferred under the Central Act should be thoroughly inquired into and, it is found that there is substance in the allegation, the victim should be suitably compensated by the State and the requisite sanction under Section 6 of the Central Act should be granted for institution of prosecution and/or a civil suit or other proceedings against the person/persons responsible for such violation."

==== T N Godavarman Thirumulkpad Vs. Union of India & Ors ====
This case related to the protection and preservation of the environment free from pollution and maintenance of the ecological balance emphasising the principle of sustainable development. The Supreme Court placed reliance on Article 21 of the Constitution of India but also on the Directive Principles in India in Article 48A and the fundamental duty in Article 51A (g) of every citizen in the Constitution of India.

The court was guided by the need to educate people in the doctrine of trust and intergenerational equity that it is the duty of every generation to preserve natural resources for the next generation. The court relied on the principle of trust as opposed to ownership of natural resources and sought to balance the need for development with preservation of the environment. The court held that The Forest Conservation Act of 1980 was enacted with a view to check further deforestation which ultimately results in ecological imbalance and therefore, the provisions made therein for the conservation of forests and fore matters connected therewith, must apply to all forests irrespective of the nature of ownership or classification thereof.

==== Other notable cases ====
Justice Verma also presided over the fodder scam case, and the prosecution of Godman Chandraswami.

=== Restatement of values of judicial life ===
Justice Verma is remembered as the judiciary's conscience keeper for his "restatement of values of judicial life." This was as a code of ethics for the judiciary in India that he instigated while Chief Justice. This was ratified and adopted by the Indian Judiciary in the Chief Justices' Conference 1999. All the High Courts in the country also adopted the same in their full court meetings. The goal was to create a resolution which would bind the judiciary for the purposes of independence, integrity, accountability, honesty and transparency. The "Restatement of Values" is meant to be an illustrative (not exhaustive) declaration of what is expected of a Judge. The Resolution was preceded by a draft statement circulated to all the High Courts of the country and suitably redrafted in the light of the suggestions which were received.

== National Human Rights Commission ==
Justice Verma served as the Chairman of the National Human Rights Commission (NHRC) from 4 November 1999 to 17 January 2003. He is known for having 'set the stage' for justice in the 2002 Gujarat Violence. On 1 April 2002 Justice Verma recommended a CBI probe into the following five cases after taking the view that investigations were being hampered by extraneous considerations and people: Godhra, Gulbarg Society, Naroda Patiya, Best Bakery, and Sardarpura in Mehsana.

The NHRC, led by Justice Verma brought a petition to the Supreme Court seeking retrial of the Best Bakery case and also four additional cases outside Gujarat after a local court had acquitted the accused. Justice Verma severely indicted the Government of Gujarat at the time of the riots. The NHRC report was quoted by the US when denying Narendra Modi a visa. The NHRC report on 31 May 2002 stated:

"The tragic events in Gujarat, starting with the Godhra train burning incident and continuing with the violence that rocked the state for over two months, have greatly saddened the nation. There is no doubt, in the opinion of this Commission, that there was a comprehensive failure on the part of the state government to control the persistent violation of the rights to life, liberty, equality and dignity of the people of the state. It is, of course, essential to heal the wounds and to look to a future of peace and harmony. But the pursuit of these high objectives must be based on justice and the upholding of the values of the Constitution of the Republic and the laws of the land. That is why it remains of fundamental importance that the measures that need to be taken to bring the violators of human rights to book are indeed taken".

=== Letter to Vajpayee ===
As chairman of the National Human Rights Commission, Verma had written a five-page letter to then Prime Minister Atal Bihari Vajpayee in which he indicted the Gujarat state government for its role in the 2002 violence in the state, and questioned the Nanavati-Mehta Commission's credibility. In a 2008 interview, Verma criticized Vajpayee's response to the letter:

He [Vajpayee] could have stepped in to monitor the situation and issue directives to the competent authorities, but he did not even comment. Nothing came over, except for a formal acknowledgement from the Prime Minister's Office.

=== NHRC Report and visit to rescue camps ===
As stated by Verma, the NHRC report on the 2002 Gujarat violence noted two issues that smacked of discrimination. Whereas a reward of Rs 2 lakhs was announced for the next of kin of victims of the attack on Sabarmati Express, a similar reward for riot victims was Rs 1 lakh. Second, POTA was being applied to the Sabarmati Express incident, but not to the riots. According to Verma:

These issues seriously impinge on the provisions of the Constitution that guarantee equality before the law and equal protection of the laws within the territory of India, and the prohibition of discrimination on grounds of religion, race, caste, sex or place of birth...Many of the largest rescue camps, including Shah-e-Alam in Ahmedabad, did not receive visits at a high political or administrative level till I visited them. This indicated a deeper malaise, discriminatory in origin and character.

== Post-retirement public service ==
=== Right to Information ===
Justice Verma was a strong believer in the Right to Information. Observing the 52nd anniversary of the adoption of the Universal Declaration of Human Rights, Justice Verma said: "In a democracy, participatory role in governments can be realised only if the right to information exists so that the public can make an informed choice."

Justice Verma had also publicly stated that the judiciary should be brought within the ambit of the Right to Information Act 2005: "To ensure transparency and accountability in the public eye, I strongly feel that judiciary should be brought into the ambit of Right to Information Act. When hearing of all the cases is done publicly, decisions are pronounced publicly, the administrative actions of the judiciary, especially judicial appointments should be made open to public scrutiny," Justice Verma told a BBC Hindi programme.

Justice Verma was one of the leading figures involved in the movement for the Right to Information Act, 2005 and in its implementation.

=== Justice Verma Committee ===
In the aftermath of the 2012 gang rape in Delhi, Justice Verma was appointed chairperson of a three-member commission tasked with reforming and invigorating anti-rape law. His committee members were Ex-Solicitor General Gopal Subramaniam and Justice Leila Seth. The Committee was assisted by a team of young lawyers, law students and academics. The Committee's counsel, Abhishek Tewari, Advocate was overall in charge of the preparation of the report. He was assisted by: Talha Abdul Rahman, Prof. Mrinal Satish, Shwetasree Majumdar, Saumya Saxena, Preetika Mathur, Siddharth Peter de Souza, Anubha Kumar, Apoorv Kurup, Devansh Mohta, Jigar Patel, Nikhil Mehra, Nishit Agrawal, Shyam Nandan, Nithyaesh Natraj and Salman Hashmi.

The Committee adopted a multidisciplinary approach, interpreting its mandate expansively. The Report deals with sexual crimes at all levels and with the measures needed for prevention as well as punishment of all offences with sexual overtones that are an affront to human dignity. This is on the basis that the issue of sexual assault against women is one that goes to the core of social norms and values. The Report also deals with the construct of gender justice in India and the various obstructions to this. The Committee's approach is founded on achieving the guarantee of equality for all in the Constitution of India.

The comprehensive 630-page report, which was completed in 29 days, was lauded both nationally and internationally. This eventually led to the passing of the Criminal Law (Amendment) Act, 2013, which was criticised as it did not adequately consider the Committee's work and recommendations.

== Legacy ==
Justice Verma is remembered for his legal innovation and firm commitment to women's empowerment, accountability of judiciary and government, probity in public life, social justice and secularism. He told fresh law graduates of the West Bengal National University of Juridical Sciences while delivering the convocation address, "Each one of you is that 'little drop' who can unite to make the 'rain' needed for the 'monsoon of purity in national character' to revive the parched field."

His legacy is carried on by the Justice Verma Foundation, whose mission is " to make the law a friend to those most in need of one." It focuses on providing quality pro bono representation to those most in need of it in High Courts and the Supreme Court. It does this by acting as a facilitator to match lawyers with clients in need.

=== Death ===
Verma died from multiple organ failure on 22 April 2013 at Medanta Hospital, Gurgaon at the age of 80. He was survived by his wife and two daughters.

In January 2014, the family of refused to accept the Padma Bhushan award conferred on him posthumously, by the Government of India. In a letter to the President, wife Pushpa Verma stated,"He never hankered or lobbied for any acclaim, reward or favour...we do not want to accept what we know justice Verma himself would not have accepted."

Legal offices
Preceded by Aziz Mushabber Ahmadi	Chief Justice of India; 25 March 1997 – 18 January 1998	Succeeded by Madan Mohan Punchhi
