= Goverdhan Lal Oza =

Former Judge of Supreme Court of India (1985-1989)

Hon'ble Justice (Retd.) Goverdhan Lal Oza
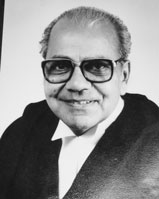

Judge of Supreme Court of India
- In office 29 October 1985 – 19 June 1987
- Nominated by: P. N. Bhagwati
- Appointed by: Zail Singh

9th Chief Justice of Madhya Pradesh High Court
- In office 1 December 1984 – 26 October 1985
- Nominated by: Y. V. Chandrachud
- Appointed by: Zail Singh
- Preceded by: G. P. Singh
- Succeeded by: J. S. Verma

Judge of Madhya Pradesh High Court
- In office 29 July 1968 – 30 November 1984; Acting CJ : 4 January 1984 - 30 November 1984
- Nominated by: M. Hidayatullah
- Appointed by: Zakir Husain

Personal details
- Born: 12 December 1924 Ujjain, Madhya Pradesh
- Died: 25 June 2001 (aged 76)
- Parent: Jamnalal Ji Oza (father)
- Education: Madhav College, Ujjain

Goverdhan Lal Jamnalal Oza (12 December 1924 - 25 June 2001), often shortened to G. L. Oza, was a judge of the Supreme Court of India and an independence activist.

== Early life ==
Oza was born in December 1924 in Ujjain, British India. His father Shri Jamnalalji Oza was a social worker of Ujjain. Oza passed from Government Madhav Arts and Commerce College, Ujjain. In the student life he took active part in student politics and Quit India movement led by Mahatma Gandhi. He joined the agitation against the rulers of the Holkar State for the merger of the State in the Indian Union at the time of Indian Independence.

== Career ==
In 1948 he started his lawyer career in Indore Court. He attended the Asian Socialist Conference at Rangoon, Burma in December 1952 as an India delegate. He practiced on Civil, Criminal and Constitutional matters. Oza was active political activist and worked in various important and political cases at Indore before elevation to the Bench. He became the Additional Judge of the Madhya Pradesh High Court at Jabalpur on 29 July 1968. On 3 January 1984 Justice Oza was appointed as Acting Chief Justice of Madhya Pradesh High Court and in December 1984 he became the permanent Chief Justice of the same High Court. He was elevated in the post of Additional Judge of the Supreme Court of India on 29 October 1985 and retired on 11 December 1989.

== Personal life ==
In March 2003, it was noted that Oza was deceased.
