= Ananda Prakash Sen =

Former judge of Supreme Court of India (1978-1988)

Hon'ble Justice (Retd.) Ananda Prakash Sen
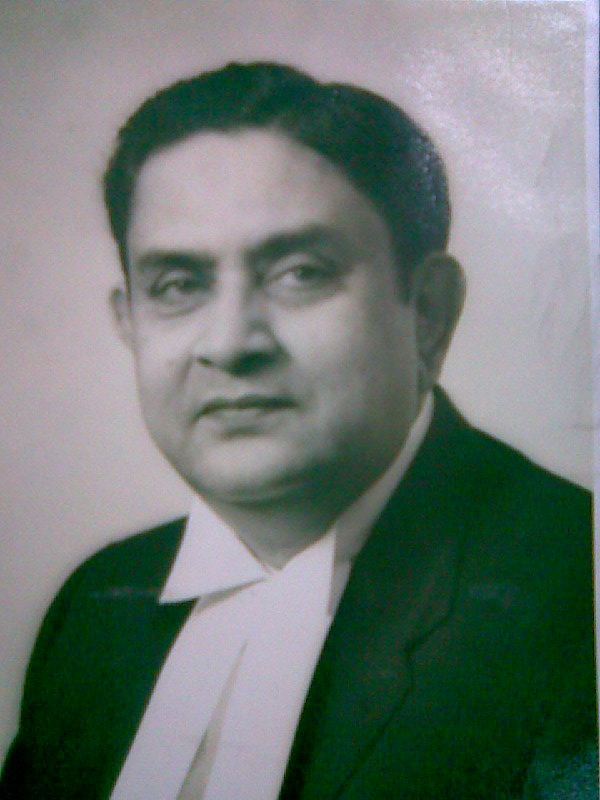

Judge of Supreme Court of India
- In office 17 July 1978 – 19 September 1988
- Nominated by: Y. V. Chandrachud
- Appointed by: Neelam Sanjiva Reddy

7th Chief Justice of Madhya Pradesh High Court
- In office 28 February 1978 – 16 July 1978
- Nominated by: M. H. Beg
- Appointed by: Neelam Sanjiva Reddy
- Preceded by: Shivdayal Shrivastava
- Succeeded by: G. P. Singh

Judge of Rajasthan High Court
- In office 29 June 1976 – 28 February 1978
- Nominated by: A. N. Ray
- Appointed by: Fakhruddin Ali Ahmed
- Acting Chief Justice
- In office 28 December 1977 – 28 February 1978
- Appointed by: Neelam Sanjiva Reddy
- Preceded by: Vedpal Tyagi
- Succeeded by: C. Honniah; Mohan Lal Joshi (acting)

Judge of Madhya Pradesh High Court
- In office 7 November 1967 – 28 June 1976
- Nominated by: K. N. Wanchoo
- Appointed by: Zakir Husain

2nd Advocate General of Madhya Pradesh
- In office 1 June 1966 – 7 November 1967
- Appointed by: K. Chengalaraya Reddy
- Preceded by: M. Adhikari
- Succeeded by: K. K. Chitale

Personal details
- Born: 20 September 1923 Burma
- Died: 26 January 2003 (aged 79)
- Education: B.Sc and LL.B
- Alma mater: Law College, Nagpur

Ananda Prakash Sen (20 September 1923–26 January 2003), often known as A. P. Sen, was a judge of the Supreme Court of India. He had also served as the 7th Chief Justice of Madhya Pradesh High Court and Acting Chief Justice of Rajasthan High Court.

== Family ==
Sen was born in Burma on 28 September 1923 into a distinguished family with a strong judicial tradition. His father, Justice Jnanranjan Sen, was a respected Judge, while his uncle also served as a Judge of the High Court of Madhya Pradesh. His uncle, Justice Vivek Ranjan Sen, was a noted lawyer who later became a Judge of the Nagpur High Court. His brother Justice C. P. Sen, who had served as a Judge of the Madhya Pradesh High Court until his retirement in 1989.

He received his early education in Nagpur and went on to pursue his studies at Science College and Law College, Nagpur. He graduated with a B.Sc. degree and subsequently began practising in the District Court at Nagpur in June 1945. His legal education was enriched by the guidance of his distinguished father and uncle, as well as by Justice M. Hidayatullah, who taught him law.

== Career ==
After Reorganisation of States in 1956 and creation of Madhya Pradesh High Court, Sen moved to Jabalpur, where he soon established himself as a prominent member of the Bar. He also contributed to the organisation of the Jabalpur Bar and served as its Secretary during 1952–53. On 1 June 1966, he was appointed the 2nd advocate general of Madhya Pradesh. He was elevated to the Bench of the Madhya Pradesh High Court on 7 November 1967.

Among his notable judgments was Additional District Magistrate of Jabalpur v. Shiv Kant Shukla, in which he rejected the Government’s preliminary objection that a petition seeking enforcement of the fundamental right to life and personal liberty under Article 21 could not be maintained during the Emergency. The judgment was subsequently challenged before the Supreme Court and became part of the landmark Habeas Corpus case.

His position on the protection of personal liberty during the Emergency was followed by his transfer to the Rajasthan High Court. On 28 December 1977, appointed as acting chief justice of Rajasthan High Court due to retirement of the then chief justice Vedpal Tyagi. After the Emergency, despite requests from the Rajasthan Government and members of the Rajasthan Bar that he remain there, he was transferred back to Madhya Pradesh as Chief Justice. He assumed office as Chief Justice of the Madhya Pradesh High Court on 28 February 1978.

Sen was elevated to the Supreme Court of India on 17 July 1978. During his decade on the Supreme Court Bench, he remained firmly committed to the protection of personal liberty and freedom of speech. He retired from the Supreme Court on 20 September 1988 after completing ten years as a Judge.

Sen was known for his simple and unassuming personality. He avoided publicity and remained deeply devoted to his work. Reflecting this nature, he became the first Judge of the Supreme Court to decline a farewell function. After retirement, instead of remaining in Delhi in search of further assignments, he returned to his home in Nagpur and chose to live a quiet and private life. He rarely attended public functions and preferred to remain away from the public spotlight.

Sen was unmarried and had a particular affection for animals and pets. He passed away on 26 January 2003 at the age of 80. He was survived by two brothers and two sisters, including his brother Justice C. P. Sen, who had served as a Judge of the Madhya Pradesh High Court until his retirement in 1989.
