= Madhya Pradesh High Court Bench at Indore =

Government court

- Interactive map of Madhya Pradesh High Court Bench at Indore
- 22°43′10.15″N 75°52′27.12″E
- Established: 1920
- Location: Indore, Madhya Pradesh
- Coordinates: 22°43′10.15″N 75°52′27.12″E
- Composition method: Presidential appointment with confirmation of Chief Justice of India and Governor of respective state.
- Authorised by: Constitution of India
- Appeals to: Supreme Court of India
- Judge term length: Till 53 years of age
- Website: indorehcbar.org

Madhya Pradesh High Court Bench at Indore is a permanent bench of Madhya Pradesh High Court in Indore. Hon’ble the Chief Justice, vide order dated 1 November 1956 constituted temporary benches of the High Court of Madhya Pradesh at Indore and Gwalior. Later, by a Presidential Notification Dated 28 November 1968, issued in the exercise of the powers conferred by the Subsection (2) of section 51 of the States Reorganisation Act, 1956, permanent benches of the High Court of Madhya Pradesh at Indore and Gwalior were established.

== History ==
In 1913, under Mandsaur Treaty, the British established their existence in Indore through East India Company. The English, wherever they went, established their military, civil and health services as well as judicial system. Implementation of proceeding to impart justice to the people having transaction with the English and residing under their jurisdiction, was initiated at all levels. Until the end of 19th century, the portions of Indore city under the jurisdiction of the British were known as cantonment. In the court of Resident, British law was applicable and District Judge of Khandwa in the British India used to come to exercise jurisdiction of High Court Judge in the cases of cantonment. In the rest of Indore under Holkars imparting justice went on as per old pattern by the jurists and petitions were finally decided in the Court of King. From the beginning of 20th Century administrative system of Holkar was highly influenced and the Britishers went on increasing their control over Malwa as advisers. From the beginning of 20th Century, officers of judiciary were being appointed according to advise of English and in Indore under the reign of Holkar, retired High Court Judges of British India were being appointed as Chief Justice. During this process, British law was adopted which prevailed as law made by Holkar. In 1931, extension of legal education started at Holkar College and thereafter study of law completely started in Indore. Prior to it, citizens of Indore had to go to Pune, Bombay, Agra and Allahabad for obtaining degree of law.

== Formation ==
In 1947, a new State known as Madhya Bharat came into existence in which Indore and other states were included and, capital and High Court both the places remained at Indore and Gwalior. On 26 January 1950, the Republic Day, constitutional High Court at Indore came into existence, and under the leadership of Hon'ble Justice Shri P.K. Kaul, the present system of High Court started at Indore. Justice Shri Kaul hailed from Allahabad High Court. Under his guidance it was decided that High Court should work at a different place. For it, the Government of Madhya Bharat obtained land from Maharaja Holkar for the present building on 22 March 1955. The President of India, Hon'ble Dr. Rajendra Prasad laid foundation stone of this building.

== Bench Conflict ==
In 1956, State of Madhya Pradesh came into existence. That time, it was apprehended that the Bench of High Court at Indore might cease its existence, because Jabalpur was awarded with the High Court in lieu of capital. The then Chief Justice Hon'ble Shri Hidayatullah tried his best to keep High Court intact and only at a place. After Hon'ble late Justice P.K. Dixit became the Chief Justice, Bench at Indore resumed its lost dignity. During his tenure Indore Bench was declared a permanent bench by the President of India instead of being a bench established by the powers vested with the Chief Justice.

In March 1959, Indore Bench was established in the present building, then the work started here with only 4 Judges. For the first time Hon'ble Shri Justice Newaskar, Hon'ble Shri Krishnan, Hon'ble Shri S.B. Sen and Hon'ble Shri Justice Razzaque were appointed.

== Territorial Jurisdiction ==
The Indore High Court bench has the second largest jurisdiction area in state with 14 revenue districts which covers whole Malwa and Nimar region i.e. western Madhya Pradesh. The revenue districts includes Alirajpur District, Barwani District, Dewas District, Dhar District, Indore District, Jhabua District, Mandsaur District, Neemuch District, Ratlam District, Rajgarh District, Shajapur District, Ujjain District and Khargone District (West Nimar), Agar Malwa District.

== See also ==
- Madhya Pradesh High Court
- List of high courts in India
