= Deepak Verma (judge) =

Indian judge

Judge of the Supreme Court of India
- In office 11 May 2009 – 28 August 2012
- Nominated by: K. G. Balakrishnan
- Appointed by: Pratibha Patil

Chief Justice of the Rajasthan High Court
- In office 6 March 2009 – 10 May 2009
- Nominated by: K. G. Balakrishnan
- Appointed by: Pratibha Patil

Judge of Karnataka High Court
- In office 2 January 2008 – 3 March 2009
- Nominated by: K. G. Balakrishnan
- Appointed by: Pratibha Patil

Personal details
- Born: 28 August 1947 (age 79) Jabalpur, Madhya Pradesh
- Spouse: Shevanti Verma
- Children: 2
- Occupation: Independent arbitrator, mediator

Deepak Verma (born 28 August 1947) is an Indian jurist and a former judge of the Supreme Court of India. His served in the Indian judiciary as the Chief Justice of the Rajasthan High Court, acting Chief Justice of the Karnataka High Court, and judge in the Madhya Pradesh High Court. After retiring from the Supreme Court, he served as an international arbitrator and mediator, and acted as an expert on matters of Indian law in several high-profile cases before foreign courts and international tribunals, including the multi-billion dollar Vijay Mallya case. He had served the role of a sports ombudsman in India, and also served as the chairperson and member of the advisory board of several distinguished non-profits, educational institutions and universities in India. He was part of the bench that delivered the landmark judgment for the Indian antirape law in 2013.

== Biography ==
=== Early life and education ===
Verma was born on 28 August 1947, in Jabalpur, Madhya Pradesh. His father, R.P. Verma, was an eminent lawyer in Jabalpur. His educational journey began with his schooling at institutions such as Christ Church, Mahakaushal High School, and Model High School, and culminated with his matriculation from Naveen Vidya Bhawan in Jabalpur. Following his matriculation, he initially pursued a B.Sc degree at Government Science College, Jabalpur, but subsequently transitioned to the field of Arts, ultimately completing his B.A. from St. Aloysius College in Jabalpur. He earned his LL.B. degree from Jabalpur University. His enrollment as an Advocate occurred in the year 1972.

=== Career ===
Verma practiced as an Advocate in the civil courts until his elevation in 1994. He acted as an Administrative Judge of Indore until August 2005. Subsequently, he continued his service as the Administrative Judge at the Madhya Pradesh High Court in Jabalpur.

As a sitting judge of the Indore bench of the Madhya Pradesh High Court, Verma was assigned as a Welfare Commissioner for the victims of the Bhopal gas disaster, tasked with disbursing compensation to those affected He is known to have disposed of all matters pending before him by holding sittings for the victims even during public holidays.

Verma was transferred as a Judge to the Karnataka High Court in Bangalore on January 2, 2008. Being the seniormost judge on the bench, he also served as the Acting Chief Justice of the Karnataka High Court. On March 4, 2009, he was further elevated as Chief Justice of the Rajasthan High Court.

On May 11, 2009, Verma was appointed as a Judge of the Supreme Court of India where he continued to serve until his retirement on August 28, 2012. He was part of several benches of the Supreme Court of India dealing with critical issues such as the Right to Food, which aimed to ensure the distribution of grain to the poor at "no cost" or "very low cost" as part of the efforts to streamline the Public Distribution System. Additionally, he was part of the bench at the Supreme Court that redefined medical negligence to include cases involving overdose of medicines, failure to inform patients about potential side-effects of drugs, lack of extra care in cases with a high mortality rate, and hospitals failing to provide fundamental amenities to patients. Notably, he also presided over the appeal in the high-profile 1999 Delhi hit-and-run case, among other significant cases. He was part of the bench that delivered the landmark judgment for the Indian anti-rape law in 2013.

Post-retirement from the Indian judiciary, Verma started acting as an arbitrator and mediator in both domestic and international disputes. He has presided around 200 domestic and international arbitrations, rendering awards in complex cases valued at several billion dollars. He has also provided expert opinions before international tribunals and courts worldwide. He was part of the panel alongside Justice Gopala Gawda in the 2020 Vijay Mallya bankruptcy matter. Verma is widely recognized as an expert in matters of Indian law. He has acted as an expert witness in several precedent-setting multijurisdictional disputes before the Federal Courts in the United States, the Senior Courts in England and Wales, the Commission for Control of INTERPOL Files (CCF), and the Permanent Court of Arbitration at the Hague. He has also acted as the inquiry authority and overseen internal investigations for several multinational corporations and banking and financial institutions.

Shilled for Nirav Modi, in an extradition case, claiming he would be subjected to "custodial interrogation" but British courts rejected this and threw the statements into the garbage bin.

== Philanthropy ==
Verma was known for his philanthropic contributions to society. During the COVID-19 pandemic, he made a contribution of Rs. 51 lakh to the Prime Minister's Relief Fund to support labourers and migrant workers. Verma serves as the Chairperson and Trustee of the Socio-Legal Information Centre (SLIC), a non-profit legal aid and education organization that provides free legal assistance to those who lack the capacity to seek legal remedy. SLIC is an implementing partner of the United Nations High Commissioner for Refugees (UNHCR). SLIC has emerged as one of India's largest and most active legal human rights program and reproductive rights unit, through its project the Human Rights Law Network (HRLN).

== Notable Appointments ==
- Chairperson: High Powered Committee appointed by the Supreme Court of India to oversee import, transfer, procurement, rescue, and rehabilitation of wild animals, including those in captivity, across India (2022).
- Ombudsman: Delhi & District Cricket Association (2020).
- Ombudsman: Hyderabad Cricket Association (2021).
- Electoral Officer: Chhattisgarh State Cricket Sangh (2022).
- Chairman: Justice Deepak Verma Committee constituted by the High Court of Madhya Pradesh in a Public Interest Litigation (2018).
- Chairman: Three-Member High-Level Committee of the All-India Tennis Association (AITA) (2013).
- Chairperson: High Powered Committee constituted by the High Court of Agartala in a Public Interest Litigation (2022).
