= Ravi Shankar Jha =

Former Chief Justice of Punjab and Haryana High Court

Hon'ble Chief Justice (Retd.) Ravi Shanker Jha

Chief Justice of Punjab and Haryana High Court
- In office 6 October 2019 – 13 October 2023
- Nominated by: Ranjan Gogoi
- Appointed by: Ram Nath Kovind
- Preceded by: Rajeev Sharma

Acting Chief Justice of Madhya Pradesh High Court
- In office 10 June 2019 – 5 October 2019
- Appointed by: Ram Nath Kovind

Judge of Madhya Pradesh High Court
- In office 18 October 2005 – 9 June 2019
- Nominated by: Ramesh Chandra Lahoti
- Appointed by: A. P. J. Abdul Kalam

Personal details
- Born: 14 October 1961 (age 64)
- Education: Rani Durgavati Vishwavidyalaya

Ravi Shanker Jha (born 14 October 1961) is an Indian retired judge, who served as the chief justice of Punjab and Haryana High Court from October 2019 to October 2023. He is a former acting chief justice of Madhya Pradesh High Court.

== Career ==
Jha obtained a law degree in 1986 from Rani Durgavati Vishwavidyalaya, Jabalpur, and was enrolled as an advocate on 20 September 1986 with the State Bar Council of Madhya Pradesh, joining the chamber of P. P. Naolekar that year. Jha practiced in Madhya Pradesh High Court since the day of enrollment. He was elevated as additional judge of Madhya Pradesh High Court on 18 October 2005 and became a permanent judge on 2 February 2007. Jha was appointed acting chief justice of Madhya Pradesh High Court on 10 June 2019 after retirement of Chief Justice Sanjay Kumar Seth, and was appointed chief justice of Punjab and Haryana High Court on 6 October 2019.
