= Ganesh Prasad Bhutt =

2nd Chief Justice of Madhya Pradesh High Court

Hon'ble Chief Justice Ganesh Prasad Bhutt
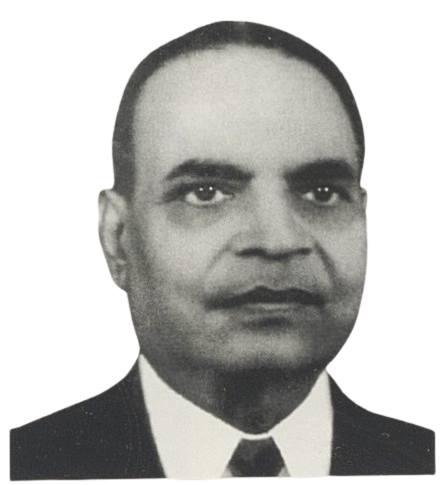

2nd Chief Justice of Madhya Pradesh High Court
- In office 13 December 1958 – 22 September 1959
- Appointed by: Rajendra Prasad
- Preceded by: M. Hidayatullah
- Succeeded by: P. V. Dixit

Judge of Madhya Pradesh High Court
- In office 1 November 1956 – 12 December 1958
- Appointed by: Rajendra Prasad

Judge of Nagpur High Court
- In office 10 February 1953 – 31 October 1956
- Appointed by: Rajendra Prasad

Personal details
- Born: 22 September 1899 British India
- Died: 11 May 1969 (aged 69)
- Profession: Judge

Ganesh Prasad Bhutt or G. P Bhutt (22 September 1899 - 11 May 1969) was an Indian Judge who served as the 2nd Chief Justice of the Madhya Pradesh High Court and previously as judge of Madhya Pradesh and Nagpur High Courts.

== Life and career ==
Bhutt was born on 22 September 1899 and began his legal career at the Jabalpur Bar in 1922. In 1927, he entered the Provincial Judicial Service as a Subordinate Judge at Raipur. He subsequently served as Chairman of various Debt Conciliation Boards and as an Additional Sessions Judge. His services were later placed at the disposal of the Central Government, where he worked in the Ministry of Defence and served on the Pensions Appeal Tribunal. On returning to Madhya Pradesh, he became District and Sessions Judge at Nagpur.

Bhutt was elevated to the Nagpur High Court on 10 February 1953. Following the reorganisation of States in 1956, he became a Judge of the newly constituted High Court of Madhya Pradesh. On 13 December 1958, he was appointed Chief Justice of the High Court of Madhya Pradesh, when he succeeded M. Hidayatullah as latter was elevated to the Supreme Court of India, and took oath before Governor H. V. Pataskar at Bhopal.

His career holds a distinctive place in the history of the Madhya Pradesh High Court. According to the Madhya Pradesh State Judicial Academy, he remains the singular example of a judge who entered the Provincial Judicial Service and subsequently rose to become Chief Justice of the High Court. His appointment was also notable for bringing him back to Jabalpur, where he had begun his legal career nearly four decades earlier.

Bhutt relinquished the office of Chief Justice of the High Court of Madhya Pradesh on 22 September 1959. Following his retirement from the judiciary, he served as the Vice-Chancellor of Dr. Hari Singh Gour University at Sagar, Madhya Pradesh. He passed away on 11 May 1969.
