= Faizanuddin =

Indian judge (1932–2019)

Justice Faizanuddin (5 February 1932 – 10 December 2019) was an Indian judge of the Supreme Court of India.

Born in 1932 in Panna State, British India, he graduated from Hamidia College of Bhopal. He was appointed a judge of Madhya Pradesh High Court in 1978, and a judge of the Supreme Court of India in 1993.

He retired from the Supreme Court in 1997, and was appointed as the Lokayukta (Ombudsman) for the State of Madhya Pradesh. He retired from the Lokayukta office in 2003. Faizanuddin died on 27 October 2019, at the age of 87.

A full court reference in his memory was held at the Supreme Court of India on 10 December 2019.
