= Sharad Bobde =

47th Chief Justice of India

Sharad Arvind Bobde
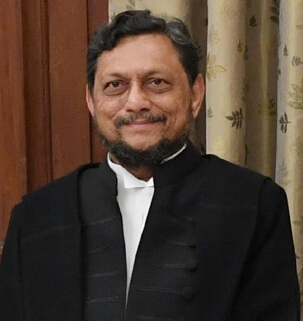

47th Chief Justice of India
- In office 18 November 2019 – 23 April 2021
- President: Ram Nath Kovind
- Preceded by: Ranjan Gogoi
- Succeeded by: N. V. Ramana

Judge of the Supreme Court of India
- In office 12 April 2013 – 17 November 2019
- Nominated by: Altamas Kabir
- Appointed by: Pranab Mukherjee

21st Chief Justice of the Madhya Pradesh High Court
- In office 16 October 2012 – 11 April 2013
- Nominated by: Altamas Kabir
- Appointed by: Pranab Mukherjee
- Preceded by: Syed Rafat Alam
- Succeeded by: Ajay Manikrao Khanwilkar

Judge of the Bombay High Court
- In office 29 March 2000 – 15 October 2012
- Nominated by: Adarsh Sein Anand
- Appointed by: K. R. Narayanan

Personal details
- Born: 24 April 1956 (age 70) Nagpur, Maharashtra, India
- Spouse: Kamini Bobde
- Children: 3
- Education: Nagpur University (BA, LLB)

Sharad Arvind Bobde (born 24 April 1956) is a retired Indian judge who served as the 47th Chief Justice of India from 18 November 2019 to 23 April 2021.

He is a former Chief Justice of the Madhya Pradesh High Court, and a former Chancellor of Maharashtra National Law University, Mumbai and Maharashtra National Law University, Nagpur. He had a tenure of eight years in the Supreme Court of India and retired on 23 April 2021. On 24 April 2021, N. V. Ramana succeeded him as the CJI.

== Family and early life ==
Bobde comes from a Nagpur-based Marathi family. His great-grandfather Ramachandra Pant Bobde was a noted lawyer in Chandrapur (erstwhile Chanda) between 1880 and 1900. The family later moved to Nagpur. His grandfather Shrinivas Ramachandra Bobde was also a lawyer. Bobde's father Arvind Shrinivas Bobde was the advocate-general of Maharashtra in 1980 and 1985. Bobde's elder brother late Vinod Arvind Bobde was a senior Supreme Court lawyer and a constitutional expert.

=== Education ===
Bobde did his schooling at St. Francis De'Sales High School, Nagpur. He completed his graduation from the St. Francis De Sales College, Nagpur and studied law at the Dr. Ambedkar Law College, Nagpur University.

== Career ==
He enrolled as an advocate on 13 September 1978, practiced at the Nagpur Bench of the Bombay High Court with appearances before the principal seat at Bombay and before the Supreme Court of India and became a Senior Advocate in 1998. Bobde was appointed an additional judge of the Bombay High Court on 29 March 2000, and subsequently promoted to Chief Justice of the Madhya Pradesh High Court on 16 October 2012 before being elevated as a judge of the Supreme Court of India on 12 April 2013.

He was appointed the 47th Chief Justice of India on 18 November 2019, succeeding Ranjan Gogoi. He became the only CJI to not recommend a single judge to be appointed to the Supreme Court of India, in his tenure of 1 year and 5 months.

He wrote 68 judgments as a judge of the Supreme Court. However, he sat on the bench for 547 cases. He has effectively written 8.5 judgments per year. The subject he has written the most judgments on in the Supreme Court is Criminal Law, with 29 judgments.

== Notable judgements and opinions ==
=== Ayodhya dispute ===
Justice Bobde was part of the five-judge constitutional bench which heard and delivered the judgment dated 9 November 2019 on the Ram Janmabhoomi-Babri Masjid land dispute case. The bench unanimously ordered the construction of a Hindu Temple in the disputed site, while ruling that the Demolition of the Babri Masjid and the 1949 desecration of the Babri Masjid was in violation of law.

=== Aadhaar ===
A three judge bench of the Supreme Court of India, comprising Bobde, Jasti Chelameswar, and Chokkalingam Nagappan, ratified an earlier order of the Supreme Court and clarified that no Indian citizen without an Aadhaar card can be deprived of basic services and government subsidies.

=== Anti-abortion ===
A two-judge bench of the Supreme Court of India, comprising Bobde and L. Nageswara Rao in 2017, rejected a woman's plea seeking termination of her foetus, based on the medical board's report that the 26-week-old foetus had a chance of survival.

=== Religious feelings ===
A two-judge bench of the Supreme Court of India, comprising Bobde and L. Nageswara Rao in 2017, upheld the ban by the Karnataka Government of a book (Basava Vachana Deepthi) by Maate Mahadevi on the grounds that it outraged the religious feelings of the Veerashaiva community.

=== Environment ===
A three-judge bench of the Supreme Court of India, comprising Bobde, T. S. Thakur and Arjan Kumar Sikri in 2016, in relation to the extreme air pollution in the National Capital Region, suspended the sales of fire crackers in the region.

=== Marital rape ===
While commenting on marital rape, Bobde remarked that when a man and a woman live as husband and wife, that act of sexual intercourse between them could not be called rape.

=== Rape of a minor ===
Bobde was hearing an appeal against anticipatory bail given to a person accused of raping a minor. During oral arguments Bobde asked the defendant "Will you marry her?". Following this exchange, women's rights and progressive groups called Bobde to step down for asking the accused rapist to marry the victim to avoid punishment.

=== Appointment of High Court Judges ===
A three-judge bench of CJI Bobde and Justices Sanjay Kishan Kaul and Surya Kant issued binding directions to streamline the appointment of high court judges, within specified timelines.
