= Hemant Gupta =

Indian judge (born 1957)

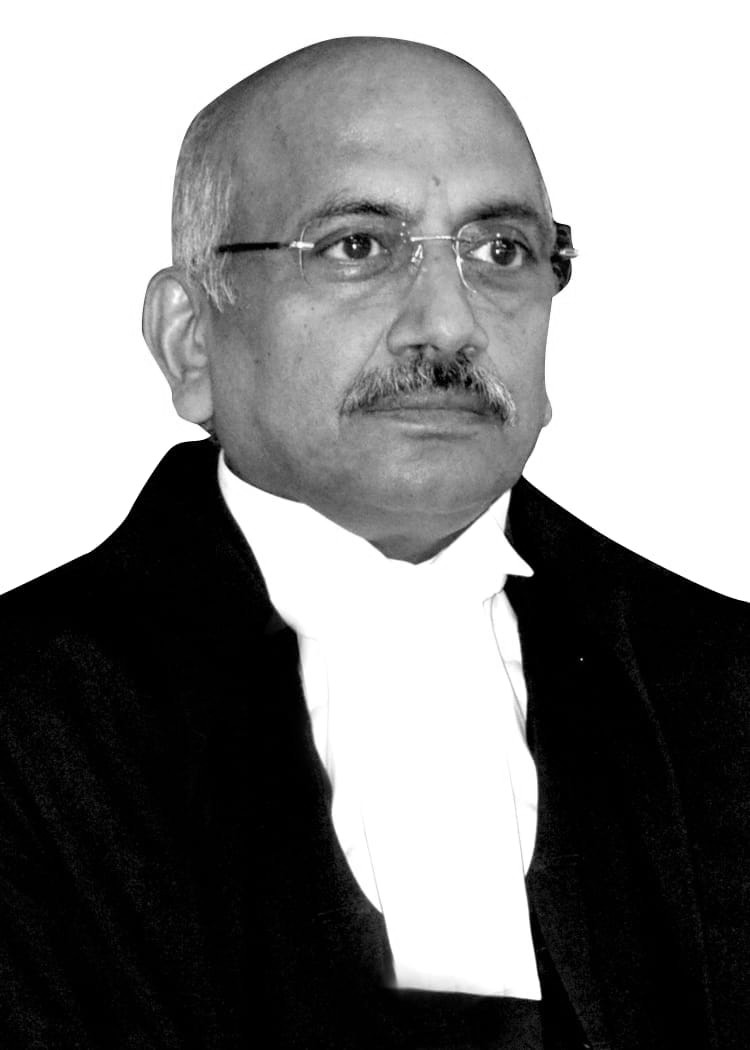

Judge of the Supreme Court of India
- In office 2 November 2018 – 16 October 2022
- Nominated by: Ranjan Gogoi
- Appointed by: Ram Nath Kovind

Chief Justice of the Madhya Pradesh High Court
- In office 18 March 2017 – 1 November 2018
- Nominated by: Jagdish Singh Khehar
- Appointed by: Pranab Mukherjee

Judge of the Patna High Court
- In office 8 February 2016 – 17 March 2017
- Nominated by: T. S. Thakur
- Appointed by: Pranab Mukherjee

Judge of the Punjab and Haryana High Court
- In office 2 July 2002 – 7 February 2016
- Nominated by: Bhupinder Nath Kirpal
- Appointed by: Kocheril Raman Narayanan

Personal details
- Born: 17 October 1957 (age 68)

Hemant Gupta (born 17 October 1957) is a former judge of Supreme Court of India. He is also a former chief justice of the Madhya Pradesh High Court and judge of the Patna High Court and Punjab and Haryana High Court. He retired on 16 October 2022.

== Career ==
Gupta enrolled as an advocate in July 1980 and started practice in the District Court of Chandigarh. He entered in the High Court of Punjab and Haryana and worked on civil, labour, company and constitutional matters. In 1997 he was appointed additional advocate general of Punjab and elevated as a judge of High Court of Punjab and Haryana on 2 July 2002. Gupta was transferred to the Patna High Court in February 2016, thereafter took over the charge of acting chief justice of the Patna High Court after the retirement of Justice Iqbal Ahmed Ansari on 29 October 2016. He was appointed the chief justice of the Madhya Pradesh High Court on 18 March 2017. On 2 November 2018, he became a judge of the Supreme Court of India. He retired on 16 October 2022.
