= Madhya Pradesh Lokayukta =

Madhya Pradesh State Ombudsman

Madhya Pradesh Lokayukta मध्य प्रदेश लोकायुक्त

Agency overview
- Formed: 1981

Jurisdictional structure
- Federal agency: India
- Operations jurisdiction: India
- Madhya Pradesh
- General nature: Federal law enforcement

Operational structure
- Headquarters: Madhya Pradesh Lok Ayukta, F-Block Sultania Rd, Old Secretrate, S B I Bank Square, Bhopal, Madhya Pradesh 462001.
- Bhopal
- Agency executive: Hon. Shri Justice Satyendra Kumar Singh., Lokayukta
- Parent agency: Lokpal

Website
- https://mplokayukt.nic.in/

India Madhya Pradesh physical.svg

Madhya Pradesh Lokayukta is the Parliamentary Ombudsman for the state of Madhya Pradesh (India). It is a high level statutory functionary, created to address grievances of the public against ministers, legislators, administration and public servants in issues related to misuse of power, mal-administration and corruption. It was first formed under the Madhya Pradesh Lokayukta and Deputy Lokayukta Act-1981, and approved by the president of India. With The Lokpal and Lokayuktas Act, 2013 adopted by the Parliament of India coming into force on 16 January 2014, each Indian state was required to appoint its Lokayukta within a year. A bench of Lokayukta should consist of judicial and non-judicial members. An Upa-Lokayukta is a deputy to Lokayukta, assisting her or him in the work and acts as the in-charge Lokayukta in case the position falls vacant before time.

A Lokayukta of the state is appointed to office by the state Governor after consulting the committee consisting of State Chief Minister, Speaker of Legislative Assembly, Leader of Opposition, Chairman of Legislative Council and Leader of Opposition of Legislative Council and cannot be removed from office except for reasons specified in the Act and will serve the period of five years.

== History and administration ==
Madhya Pradesh Lokayukta Act makes provision for serving Chief Justice or Judge in any High Courts of India or a serving Judge in Supreme Court of India to be appointed as its Lokayukta. Additionally the Act gave a provision to appoint a Deputy Lokayukta or Upa-Lokayukta with the eligibility of 1. A person who is serving as Judge in any Indian High Court or 2. a person who has retired from any position with state or central government and having pay scale more than that of an Addl Secretary in Indian Government. Deputy Lokayukta is appointed after consulting Lokayukta.

Madhya Pradesh Lokayukta vacancies are not openly disclosed.

== Oath or affirmation ==
"I, <name>, having been appointed Lokayukta (or Upa-Lokayukta) do swear in the name of God (or solemnly affirm) that I will bear faith and allegiance to the Constitution of India as by law established and I will duly and faithfully and to the best of my ability, knowledge and judgment perform the duties of my office without fear or favour, affection or ill-will."

— First Schedule, Madhya Pradesh Lokayukta and Deputy Lokayukta Act-1981

== Powers ==
Madhya Pradesh Lokayukta has complete and exclusive authority for enquiring into allegations or complaints against the State Chief Minister, State Deputy Chief Minister, Ministers of the state Government, Leader of Opposition and Government officials of serving as Secretary and above Additional Secretary. The enquiry with Upa-Lokayukta or Deputy Lokayukta shall include all other complaints excluding those with powers specifically with the state Lokayukta.

Madhya pradesh Lokayukta is exempted by Right to Information Act to disclose details of search operations conducted by Income Tax Department against the corrupt officials of the state.

== Appointment and tenure ==
Madhya Pradesh Lokayukta Act made provision for a person appointed to the position of Lokayukta will serve for a period of six years. Members having served in these two positions are not eligible to be reappointed. Madhya Pradesh Government created the provision in Madhya Pradesh Lokayukta Act to further extend the tenure of the Lokayukta and Deputy Lokayukta for a period not more than one year after their retirement in case the State Government fails to appoint anyone in their place.

In 2019, retired judge of Madhya Pradesh High Court Naresh Kumar Gupta was sworn in as State Loka-Ayukta.

== Notable cases ==
In 2015, law enforcement agencies of Lokayukta had filed a case against Madhya Pradesh Tourism Development Corporation (MPTDC), on a complaint filed by security agency in an issue relating to awarding of a contract on assigning of security in tourist places of the state.

In 2014, the institution had caught around 102 employees of state government with positions ranging from peon to top ranking officials for various offences relating to bribery.

== See also ==
- Lokpal and Lokayukta Act, 2013
- Gujarat Lokayukta
- Telangana Lokayukta
- Chhattisgarh Lokayog
- Delhi Lokayukta
