= P. P. Naolekar =

Indian judge (born 1943)

Lokayukta of Madhya Pradesh
- Incumbent
- Assumed office 2012

Judge of the Supreme Court of India
- In office 2004–2008

Chief Justice of the Gauhati High Court
- In office 2002–2004

Personal details
- Born: 29 June 1943 (age 83)
- Education: Jabalpur University
- Occupation: Judge

P. P. Naolekar (born 29 June 1943) is the Lokayukta (parliamentary ombudsman) of Madhya Pradesh in India. He was a judge of the Supreme Court of India, from 2004 to 2008.
