= N. V. Ramana =

48th Chief Justice of India

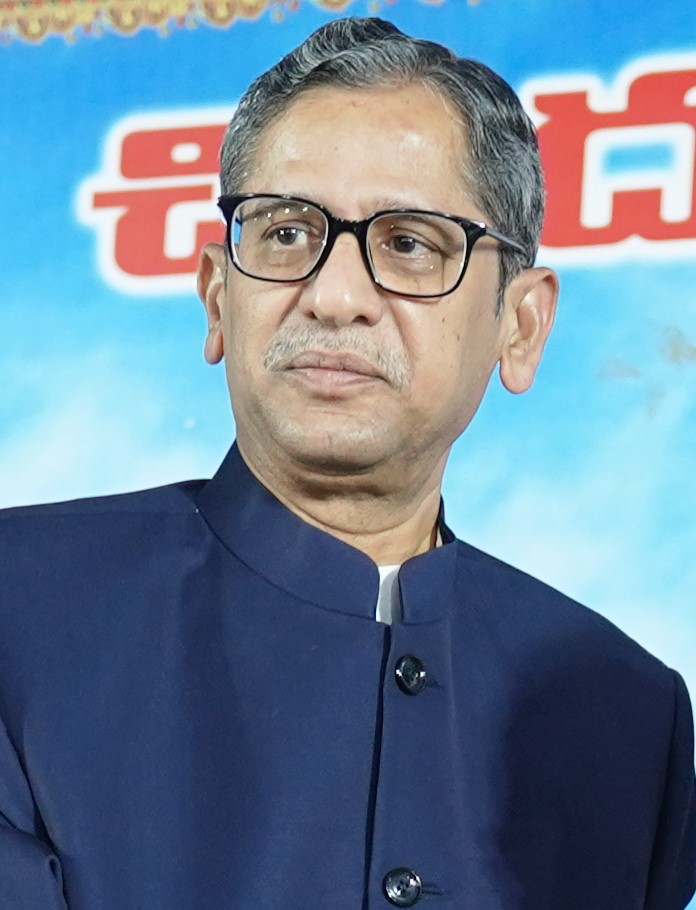
- Ramana in 2021

48th Chief Justice of India
- In office 24 April 2021 – 26 August 2022
- Appointed by: Ram Nath Kovind
- Preceded by: Sharad Arvind Bobde
- Succeeded by: Uday Umesh Lalit

Judge of the Supreme Court of India
- In office 17 February 2014 – 23 April 2021
- Nominated by: P. Sathasivam
- Appointed by: Pranab Mukherjee

28th Chief Justice of the Delhi High Court
- In office 2 September 2013 – 16 February 2014
- Nominated by: P. Sathasivam
- Appointed by: Pranab Mukherjee
- Preceded by: D. Murugesan
- Succeeded by: G. Rohini

Judge of Andhra Pradesh High Court
- In office 27 June 2000 – 1 September 2013; Acting CJ: 10 March 2013 – 20 May 2013
- Nominated by: Adarsh Sein Anand
- Appointed by: K. R. Narayanan

Personal details
- Born: Nuthalapati Venkata Ramana; 27 August 1957 (age 69) Ponnavaram, Andhra Pradesh, India
- Citizenship: Indian
- Education: Nagarjuna University,(Bsc, LLB)

Nuthalapati Venkata Ramana ([nuːtalapaːʈi venkaʈa ɾamaɳa]; born 27 August 1957) is a former Indian judge and journalist who served as the 48th Chief Justice of India.

Previously, he was a judge on the Supreme Court of India, chief justice of Delhi High Court and an acting chief justice of Andhra Pradesh High Court. He has also been the president of the Andhra Pradesh Judicial Academy.

== Early life ==
He was born in a Telugu-speaking agrarian family on 27 August 1957 in Ponnavaram village in Krishna district of Andhra Pradesh. Ramana joined Nagarjuna University (Guntur) for his graduation in science and later in law.

== Career ==
=== Journalism and litigation ===
From 1979 to 1980, Ramana was a journalist for the Eenadu newspaper. He enrolled as an advocate on February 10, 1983. He practiced in the High Court of Andhra Pradesh, Central and Andhra Pradesh Administrative Tribunals and the Supreme Court of India, handling civil, criminal, labor, service and election matters. He also handled a number of constitutional matters, including federal river disputes in India. Ramana was a counsel for several government organizations during this time, including an appointment as an additional standing counsel for the Central Government and a standing counsel for the Indian Railways in the Central Administrative Tribunal at Hyderabad. He has also functioned as the Additional Advocate General for the state of Andhra Pradesh.

=== Judicial ===
Ramana became a permanent judge of the Andhra Pradesh High Court on 27 June 2000. On 2 September 2013, he was appointed the Chief Justice of the Delhi High Court and on 17 February 2014 he became a judge in the Supreme Court of India. In March 2021, then Chief Justice Sharad Arvind Bobde of the Supreme Court recommended him as his successor to the post of chief justice. Ramana was appointed the 48th Chief Justice by President Ram Nath Kovind on 6 April 2021, taking his oath of office at Rashtrapati Bhavan on 24 April 2021. He retired on 26 August 2022. He was succeeded by Justice U.U. Lalit.

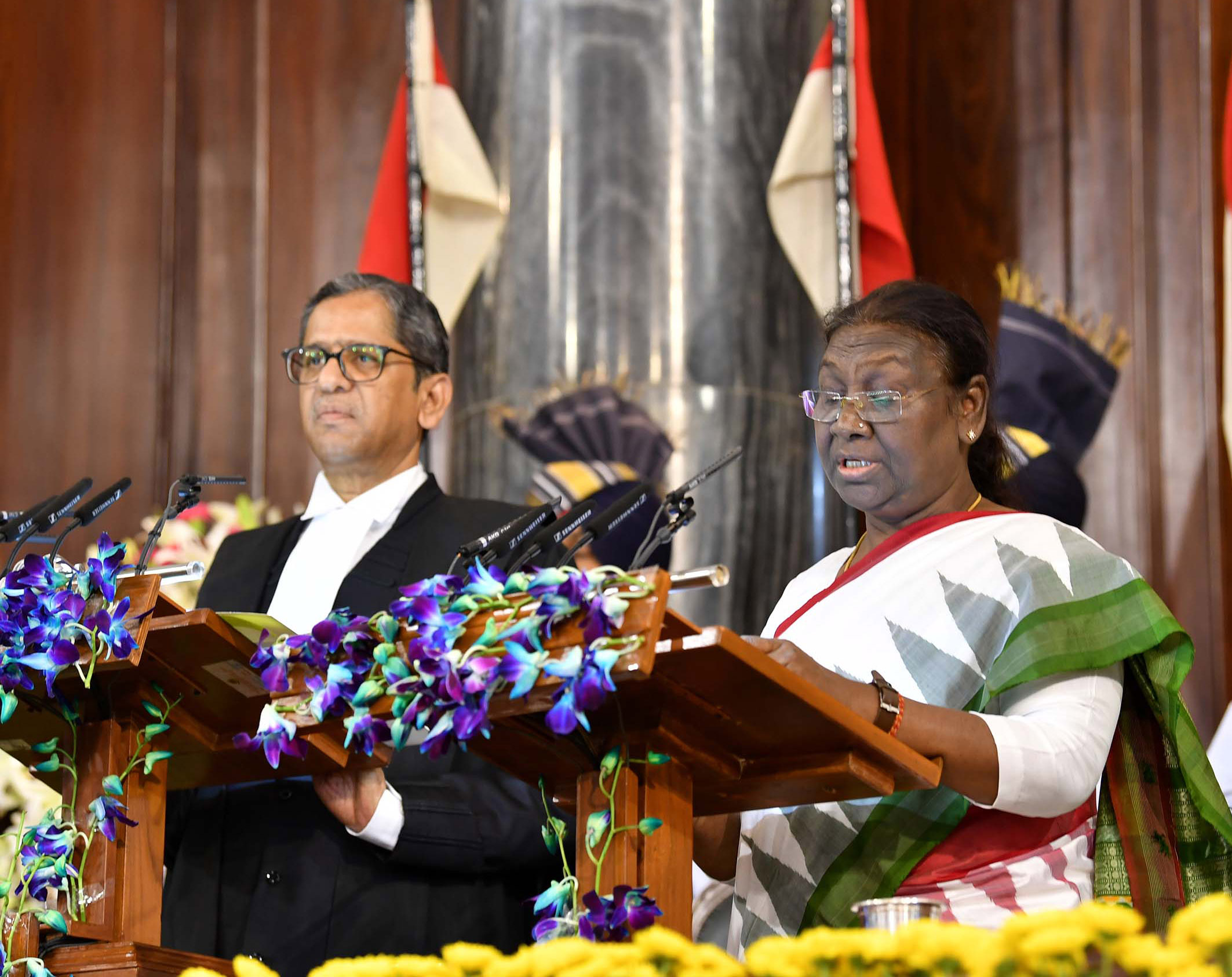
Chief Justice Ramana administering the oath of the office to the president Droupadi Murmu

==== Chief Justice of the Supreme Court ====
His tenure as chief justice saw an increase in judicial appointments to the Supreme Court and high courts, which brought down vacancies to their lowest since 2016. He allowed exclusive online access to the media to attend court proceedings.

He also did key judicial interventions in many cases. Some notable ones are: putting sedition law on hold, cancelling the bail granted to Ashish Mishra in the case regarding Lakhimpur Kheri violence, setting up a panel to investigate the Pegasus case in which the bench said that the Union government did not cooperate in the investigation, and his judgement that a woman's household labor was equivalent to that of an office-working man.

As Chief Justice, he constituted a 3-judge panel that he headed to look into a petition challenging a 2013 Supreme Court verdict which held the practice of political parties distributing private goods like televisions, laptops, etc. as not a corrupt practice and considered them to come under the directive principles, while the petitioners considered them to be "irrational freebies".

He was criticized for not initiating a judicial review in any of the cases which require a constitutional bench. 53 such cases were pending when he retired. Some of the pending cases of importance include, a challenge to Citizenship (Amendment) Act, 2019, a challenge to Electoral Bonds scheme, the abrogation of Article 370 in Jammu and Kashmir, and Karnataka hijab ban.

Over the course of his Supreme Court tenure, the Ramana-led Supreme Court Collegium close to 224 judges to High Courts across India.

By being Chief Justice of India, he also administered oath of office to 15th President of India Droupadi Murmu.

== Opinions ==
=== Central Bureau of Investigation ===
While speaking at a lecture on "Democracy: Role and Responsibilities of Investigative Agencies", he discussed the evolution of the police system in India from the British period. As time passed he noted that the Central Bureau of Investigation (CBI) has "come under deep public scrutiny". According to Ramana, through "actions and inactions" CBI has often raised "questions on its credibility". He said it was the need of the hour to "reclaim social legitimacy and public trust" and the first step to that "is to break nexus with political and executive".

He said, "The image of police is tarnished by allegations of corruption etc... often police officers approach us saying they are being harassed with change in power… The political executives will change with time. You are permanent", "There is an immediate requirement for the creation of an independent umbrella institution, so as to bring various agencies like the CBI, SFIO, ED, etc. under one roof. This body is required to be created under a statute, clearly defining its powers, functions and jurisdictions. Such a law will also lead to much needed legislative oversight,".

He suggested that the proposed independent and impartial authority, should be "appointed by a committee akin to the one which appoints the Director of the CBI. The head of the organisation can be assisted by deputies who are specialists in different domains".

=== Access to legal aid ===
While speaking at the All India District Legal Services Authorities meet as the Chief Justice he highlighted the fact that only a small percentage of the population could afford to approach the courts while the majority suffered in silence, and considered access to justice a tool of social emancipation. He highlighted the need to strengthen district judiciary, and urged lawyers and the judiciary to actively intervene on behalf of the rights of the undertrial prisoners.

=== Shrinking Opposition ===
While speaking at an event at the Rajasthan Legislative Assembly he stated that the opposition space was diminishing, and the lack of mutual respect and increasing hostility between the government and opposition was not a sign of healthy democracy. He stated that India is a parliamentary democracy with representation being the core idea of such a democracy, with minority not being overwhelmed by the majority. He believed that the opposition should be strengthened to strengthen parliamentary democracy but believed that the opposition space was diminishing with the government passing laws without deliberation and scrutiny.

== Allegations of corruption ==
In October 2020, Andhra Pradesh Chief Minister Y. S. Jagan Mohan Reddy wrote to the then chief justice, S. A. Bobde, alleging that Ramana and his relatives had engaged in corruption in relation to the acquisition of land in the newly established city of Amaravati, and was attempting to destabilize the Andhra Pradesh Government by allegedly influencing hearings and decisions in the Andhra Pradesh High Court. Reddy asked the chief justice to investigate the matter and take appropriate action. The letter was widely reported and provoked both, support for an investigation as well as opposition from judges and lawyers' bodies. The Delhi High Court Bar Association condemned the letter, and the All India Lawyers' Union called for an inquiry, with penalties to be imposed on Reddy if the allegations were found to be untrue. Following the release of the letter, Ramana spoke at an event to release a book by former Supreme Court judge R. Banumathi, stating that judges had become "soft targets for criticism" and "victims of juicy gossip and slanderous social media posts."

Prior to this, the Andhra Pradesh High Court had, in September 2020, gagged the media from reporting on the registration of a case of corruption concerning land deals in Amravati against several persons, including Ramana's daughters. The gag order was later lifted by the Supreme Court, after hearing the advocates on merits; meanwhile, a stay on the investigation continued until November 2020.

In November 2020, the Attorney General of India, K. K. Venugopal refused to grant permission for proceedings of contempt of court against Y. S. Jagan Mohan Reddy after he was requested to do so by BJP leader Ashwini Kumar Upadhyay. He noted that while Reddy's comments were "contumacious" and that the timing of his letter was "suspect" as the Andhra Pradesh High Court was currently hearing a number of cases concerning allegations of corruption against Y. S. Jagan Mohan Reddy's government, he would nevertheless, not be allowing a contempt case to proceed against Reddy at the Supreme Court for his statements about Ramana. The Attorney General also declined a second request to initiate contempt proceedings, stating that the Court was free to initiate proceedings by itself.

In November 2020, three petitions were filed at the Supreme Court against Y. S. Jagan Mohan Reddy for the allegations made in his letter, calling for his removal as Chief Minister of Andhra Pradesh in response to the allegations against Ramana. Supreme Court Judge U.U. Lalit recused himself from hearing these petitions. On 24 March 2021, the Supreme Court issued a statement indicating that according to an in-house procedure for investigating complaints, the allegations against Ramana had been found to be "meritless" and closed the investigation. The Court also stated that they would not be releasing their report on the allegations, as it was "...strictly confidential."

Legal offices
Preceded by Sharad Arvind Bobde	48th Chief Justice of India; 2021–2022	Succeeded by Uday Umesh Lalit
