= Madhya Pradesh High Court =

Subnational high court in India

Madhya Pradesh High Court मध्य प्रदेश उच्च न्यायालय
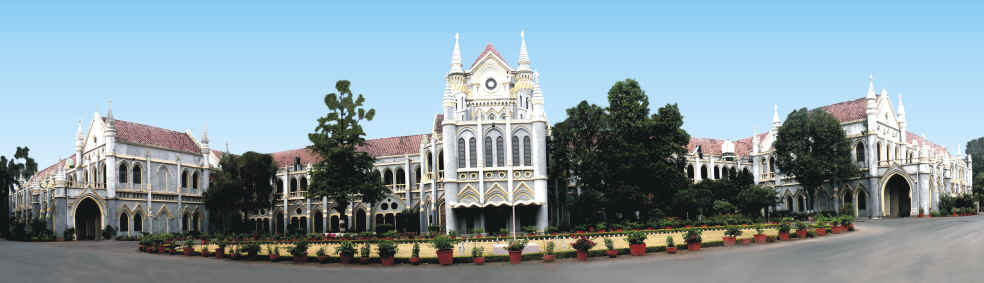
- Panoramic view of the Court building

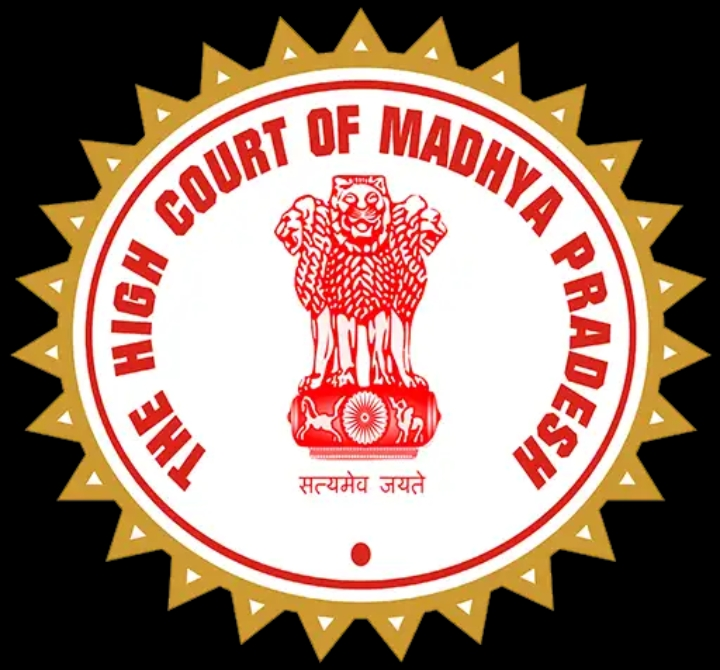
- Official logo Madhya Pradesh High Court
- Interactive map of Madhya Pradesh High Court मध्य प्रदेश उच्च न्यायालय
- 23°9′38″N 79°56′19″E
- Established: 2 January 1936; 86 years ago
- Jurisdiction: Madhya Pradesh
- Location: Principal Seat: Jabalpur, M.P. Circuit Benches: Indore and Gwalior
- Coordinates: 23°9′38″N 79°56′19″E
- Composition method: Presidential with confirmation of Chief Justice of India and Governor of respective state.
- Authorised by: Constitution of India
- Appeals to: Supreme Court of India
- Judge term length: Mandatory retirement by age of 62
- Number of positions: 53
- Language: Hindi English
- Website: http://mphc.gov.in/

Chief Justice
- Currently: Alpesh Y. Kogje
- Since: 10 September 2026

The Madhya Pradesh High Court is the High Court of the state of Madhya Pradesh which is located in Jabalpur. It was established as the Nagpur High Court on 2 January 1936 by Letters Patent dated 2 January 1936, issued under Section 108 the Government of India Act, 1935. This Letters Patent continued in force even after the adoption of the constitution of India on 26 January 1950 by virtue of Articles 225 & 372 thereof. The court has a sanctioned judge strength of 53.

== History ==
The present state of Madhya Pradesh was originally created as Central Provinces in the 19th century, as Judicial Commission's territory and was administered by the Judicial Commissioner. The Judicial Commissioner's court at Nagpur was, at that time, the highest court of the territory. It was converted into a Governor's province in 1921, when it became entitled to a full-fledged High Court for the administration of justice.

Later, Berar, a part of Nizam's state of Hyderabad, was transferred in 1933 to the Central Province, for administration. This gave the state its new name Central Provinces and Berar. Thereafter, by virtue of Letters Patent dated 2 January 1936, issued under Section 108 of the Government of India Act, 1935, by King Emperor, George the Fifth, the Nagpur High Court was established for Central Pronvices and Berar. This Letters Patent, under which the Nagpur High Court was constituted and invested with jurisdiction, continued to remain in force even after the adoption of the constitution of India on 26 January 1950, by virtue of Articles 225 & 372 thereof.

On 1 November 1956, the new state of Madhya Pradesh was constituted under States Reorganisation Act. Subsection (1) of Section 49 of the States Re-organisation Act ordained that from the appointed day i.e., 1 November 1956, the High Court exercising jurisdiction, in relation to the existing state of Madhya Pradesh, i.e. Nagpur High Court, shall be deemed to be the High Court for the present state of Madhya Pradesh. Thus Nagpur High Court was not abolished but by a legal fiction it became High Court for the new state of Madhya Pradesh with its seat at Jabalpur. Hon'ble the Chief Justice, vide order dated 1 November 1956 constituted temporary benches of the High Court of Madhya Pradesh at Indore and Gwalior. Later, by a Presidential Notification Dt. 28 November 1968, issued in the exercise of the powers conferred by the Subsection (2) of section 51 of the States Reorganization Act, 1956, permanent benches of the High Court of Madhya Pradesh at Indore and Gwalior were established. This state of affairs continued till 1 November 2000, when the state of Chhattisgarh was carved of the existing state of Madhya Pradesh by virtue of the provisions of the Madhya Pradesh Reorganization Act, 2000 and the High Court of Chhattisgarh was established for that state with its seat at Bilaspur. The High Court of Madhya Pradesh at Jabalpur then became High Court for the successor state of Madhya Pradesh.

== Principal seat & Benches ==
The principal seat of the court is in Jabalpur. The court is housed in an impressive building constructed by Raja Gokul Das in 1899. The building was designed by Henry Irwin in 1886. The construction work of this building was commenced in 1886 and completed in 1889. The building was constructed in brick-lime with ornamental towers and cornices. The architecture of the building is mixed baroque and oriental. The arches, as well as the bastions at the corners, are ornamental. There are 25 courtrooms in this building.

On 1 November 1956, two temporary benches of the High Court of Madhya Pradesh were constituted, one at Indore and the other at Gwalior. Later by a Notification, these were converted to permanent benches on 28 November 1968.

== Chief Justice and Judges ==
The current sitting judges of the court are as follows:

== Former Chief Justices ==
=== Nagpur High Court ===
#	Chief Justice	Term
1	Gilbert Stone	9 January 1936 – 1943
2	Frederick Louis Grille	1943 – 1949
3	Vivian Bose	1949 – 1951
4	Bhuvaneshwar Prasad Sinha	24 February 1951 – 2 December 1954
5	M. Hidayatullah	3 December 1954 – 31 October 1956

=== Madhya Pradesh High Court ===
#	Chief Justice	Tenure	
#	Chief Justice	Start	Finish
1	M. Hidayatullah	1 November 1956	30 November 1958
2	Ganesh Prasad Bhutt	13 December 1958	12 September 1959
3	P. V. Dixit	22 September 1959	18 March 1969
4	Bishambhar Dayal	19 March 1969	13 September 1972
5	P. K. Tare	14 September 1972	10 October 1975
6	Shiv Dayal Shrivastava	11 October 1975	27 February 1978
7	Ananda Prakash Sen	28 February 1978	16 July 1978
8	G. P. Singh	27 July 1978	3 January 1984
9	Goverdhanlal Jamnalal Oza	1 December 1984	28 October 1985
10	J. S. Verma	14 June 1986	31 August 1986
11	Narayan Dutt Ojha	8 January 1987	17 January 1988
12	G. G. Sohani	20 October 1989	23 October 1989
13	Sushil Kumar Jha	27 October 1989	15 December 1993
14	Ullal Lakshminarayan Bhat	15 December 1993	13 October 1995
15	A. K. Mathur	3 February 1996	21 December 1999
16	Bhawani Singh	24 February 2000	24 August 2003
17	Kumar Rajarathnam	6 September 2003	12 March 2004
18	R. V. Raveendran	8 July 2004	8 September 2005
19	A. K. Patnaik	2 October 2005	16 November 2009
20	Syed Rafat Alam	20 December 2009	4 August 2011
21	Sharad Arvind Bobde	16 October 2012	11 April 2013
22	Ajay Manikrao Khanwilkar	24 November 2013	12 May 2016
23	Hemant Gupta	18 March 2017	1 November 2018
24	Sanjay Kumar Seth	14 November 2018	9 June 2019
25	Ajay Kumar Mittal	3 November 2019	29 September 2020
26	Mohammad Rafiq	3 January 2021	13 October 2021
27	Ravi Malimath	14 October 2021	24 May 2024
28	Suresh Kumar Kait	25 September 2024	23 May 2025
29	Sanjeev Sachdeva	17 July 2025	1 June 2026

== Judges elevated as Chief Justices ==
This sections contains list of only those judges elevated as chief justices whose parent high court is Madhya Pradesh. This includes those judges who, at the time of appointment as chief justice, may not be serving in Madhya Pradesh High Court but this list does not include judges who at the time of appointment as chief justice were serving in Madhya Pradesh High Court but does not have Madhya Pradesh as their Parent High Court.

Colour Key

- Female Chief Justice
- Served as Chief Justice of India

Symbol Key

- ^{‡} Elevated to Supreme Court of India
- ^{RES} Resigned
- ^{†} Died in office

Name	Image	Appointed as CJ in HC of	Date of appointment		Date of retirement (Note: this includes date of resignation, death and elevation to supreme court)	Tenure	
Name	Image	Appointed as CJ in HC of	As Judge	As Chief Justice	Date of retirement	As Chief Justice	As Judge (Note: also includes tenure as Chief Justice)
Prabhakar Keshava Tare		Madhya Pradesh	14 December 1957	14 September 1972	10 October 1975	3 years, 27 days	17 years, 301 days
Shivdayal Shrivastava		Madhya Pradesh	3 November 1958	11 October 1975	27 February 1978	2 years, 140 days	19 years, 117 days
Ananda Prakash Sen		Madhya Pradesh	7 November 1967	28 February 1978	16 July 1978^{[‡]}	139 days	10 years, 252 days
Guru Prasanna Singh		Madhya Pradesh	7 November 1967	27 July 1978	3 January 1984	5 years, 161 days	16 years, 58 days
Goverdhan Lal Oza		Madhya Pradesh	29 July 1968	1 December 1984	26 October 1985^{[‡]}	330 days	17 years, 90 days
Jagdish Sharan Verma		Madhya Pradesh, transferred to Rajasthan	12 September 1972	14 June 1986	2 June 1989^{[‡]}	2 years, 354 days	16 years, 264 days
Gangadhar Ganesh Sohani		Madhya Pradesh, transferred to Patna	2 June 1973	20 October 1989	18 December 1990	1 year, 60 days	17 years, 200 days
Bipin Chandra Verma		Punjab & Haryana	21 August 1978	19 September 1991	2 May 1992	227 days	13 years, 256 days
Shashi Kant Seth		Himachal Pradesh	27 November 1978	22 June 1993	27 August 1993	67 days	14 years, 274 days
Gulab Chand Gupta		Himachal Pradesh	20 June 1983	17 September 1994	28 February 1995	165 days	11 years, 254 days
Krishna Murari Agarwal		Sikkim	14 May 1984	15 February 1996	26 October 1996	255 days	12 years, 166 days
Brij Mohan Lal		Patna	14 May 1984	9 July 1997	6 October 1999	2 years, 90 days	15 years, 146 days
Devdatta Madhav Dharmadhikari		Gujarat	24 March 1989	25 January 2000	4 March 2002^{[‡]}	2 years, 39 days	12 years, 346 days
Prakash Prabhakar Naolekar		Gauhati	15 June 1992	10 June 2002	26 August 2004^{[‡]}	2 years, 78 days	12 years, 73 days
Rajiv Gupta		Kerala, transferred to Uttarakhand then to Chhattisgarh	27 September 1994	27 April 2005	9 October 2012	7 years, 166 days	18 years, 13 days
Ramesh Surajmal Garg		Gauhati	15 December 1994	17 April 2010	18 June 2010	63 days	15 years, 186 days
Deepak Verma		Rajasthan	15 December 1994	6 March 2009	10 May 2009^{[‡]}	69 days	14 years, 147 days
Arun Kumar Mishra		Rajasthan, transferred to Calcutta	25 October 1999	26 November 2010	6 July 2014^{[‡]}	3 years, 223 days	14 years, 255 days
Abhay Manohar Sapre		Manipur, transferred to Gauhati	25 October 1999	23 March 2013	12 August 2014^{[‡]}	1 year, 164 days	14 years, 292 days
Uma Nath Singh		Meghalaya	22 October 2001	19 March 2015	14 January 2016	302 days	14 years, 85 days
Ajit Singh		Gauhati	1 April 2002	5 March 2016	5 September 2018	2 years, 185 days	16 years, 158 days
Rajendra Menon		Patna, transferred to Delhi	1 April 2002	15 March 2017	6 June 2019	2 years, 84 days	17 years, 67 days
Sanjay Kumar Seth		Madhya Pradesh	21 March 2003	14 November 2018	9 June 2019	208 days	16 years, 81 days
Ravi Shankar Jha		Punjab & Haryana	18 October 2005	6 October 2019	13 October 2023	4 years, 8 days	17 years, 361 days
Jitendra Kumar Maheshwari		Andhra Pradesh, transferred to Sikkim	25 November 2005	7 October 2019	30 August 2021^{[‡]}	1 year, 328 days	15 years, 279 days
Sanjay Yadav		Allahabad	2 March 2007	13 June 2021	25 June 2021	13 days	14 years, 116 days
Satish Chandra Sharma		Telangana, transferred to Delhi	18 January 2008	11 October 2021	8 November 2023^{[‡]}	2 years, 29 days	15 years, 295 days
Prakash Shrivastava		Calcutta	18 January 2008	11 October 2021	30 March 2023	1 year, 171 days	15 years, 72 days
Alok Aradhe		Telangana, transferred to Bombay	29 December 2009	23 July 2023	28 August 2025^{[‡]}	2 years, 37 days	15 years, 243 days
Sheel Nagu		Punjab & Haryana	27 May 2011	9 July 2024	1 June 2026^{[‡]}	1 year, 328 days	15 years, 6 days
Sujoy Paul		Calcutta	27 May 2011	16 January 2026	20 June 2026	156 days	15 years, 25 days
Sushrut Arvind Dharmadhikari		Madras	7 April 2016	6 March 2026	Incumbent	247 days	10 years, 215 days

=== Judges appointed as Acting Chief Justice ===
Name	Appointed as ACJ in HC of	Date of appointment as Judge	Period as Acting Chief Justice	Date of retirement	Tenure as ACJ	Tenure as Judge	Remarks	Ref..
A. P. Sen	Rajasthan	7 November 1967	28 Dec 1977 – 28 Feb 1978	16 July 1978^{[‡]}	63 days	10 years, 252 days	Elevated as CJ of Madhya Pradesh	
G. P. Singh	Madhya Pradesh	7 November 1967	14 Jul 1978 – 26 Jul 1978	3 January 1984	13 days	16 years, 58 days	Became permanent	
G. L. Oza	Madhya Pradesh	29 July 1968	4 Jan 1984 – 30 Nov 1984	26 October 1985^{[‡]}	332 days	17 years, 90 days	Became permanent	
J. S. Verma	Madhya Pradesh	12 September 1972	27 Oct 1985 – 13 Jun 1986	2 June 1989^{[‡]}	230 days	16 years, 264 days	Became permanent	
G. G. Sohani	Madhya Pradesh	2 June 1973	31 Aug 1986 – 7 Jan 1987	18 December 1990	130 days	17 years, 200 days	--	
G. G. Sohani	Madhya Pradesh	2 June 1973	19 Jan 1988 – 19 Oct 1989	18 December 1990	1 year, 274 days	17 years, 200 days	Became permanent	
Virendra Dutta Gyani	Gauhati	14 May 1984	15 Feb 1997 – 17 Jun 1997	29 July 1998	122 days	14 years, 77 days	--	
Virendra Dutta Gyani	Gauhati	14 May 1984	13 Apr 1998 – 29 Jul 1998	29 July 1998	108 days	14 years, 77 days	Retired as ACJ	
V. S. Kokje	Rajasthan	28 July 1990	25 May 1998 – 15 Jan 1999	6 September 2001	236 days	11 years, 41 days	--	
V. S. Kokje	Rajasthan	28 July 1990	17 Jan 1999 – 21 Jan 1999	6 September 2001	5 days	11 years, 41 days	--	
V. S. Kokje	Rajasthan	28 July 1990	15 Mar 2000 – 28 May 2000	6 September 2001	75 days	11 years, 41 days	--	
Rajiv Gupta	Madhya Pradesh	27 September 1994	24 Aug 2003 – 5 Sep 2003	9 October 2012	13 days	18 years, 13 days	--	
Rajiv Gupta	Madhya Pradesh	27 September 1994	13 Mar 2004 – 7 Jul 2004	9 October 2012	117 days	18 years, 13 days	--	
Fakhruddin	Chhattisgarh	15 December 1994	16 Jan 2002 – 5 Feb 2002	3 September 2006	21 days	11 years, 263 days	--	
Fakhruddin	Chhattisgarh	15 December 1994	11 May 2004 – 27 May 2004	3 September 2006	17 days	11 years, 263 days	--	
Fakhruddin	Chhattisgarh	15 December 1994	8 Jan 2005 – 13 Mar 2005	3 September 2006	65 days	11 years, 263 days	--	
Fakhruddin	Chhattisgarh	15 December 1994	2 Oct 2005 – 16 Nov 2005	3 September 2006	46 days	11 years, 263 days	--	
R. S. Garg	Chhattisgarh	15 December 1994	1 Nov 2000 – 4 Dec 2000	18 June 2010	34 days	15 years, 186 days	--	
R. S. Garg	Madhya Pradesh	15 December 1994	17 Nov 2009 – 19 Dec 2009	18 June 2010	33 days	15 years, 186 days	--	
Deepak Verma	Madhya Pradesh	15 December 1994	9 Sep 2005 – 1 Oct 2005	10 May 2009^{[‡]}	23 days	14 years, 147 days	--	
Deepak Verma	Karnataka	15 December 1994	7 Jul 2008 – 7 Aug 2008	10 May 2009^{[‡]}	32 days	14 years, 147 days	--	
Arun Mishra	Rajasthan	25 October 1999	1 Nov 2010 – 25 Nov 2010	6 July 2014^{[‡]}	25 days	14 years, 255 days	Became permanent	
A. M. Sapre	Chhattisgarh	25 October 1999	10 Oct 2012 – 21 Oct 2012	12 August 2014^{[‡]}	12 days	14 years, 292 days	--	
Krishn Kumar Lahoti	Madhya Pradesh	22 October 2001	12 Apr 2013 – 23 Nov 2013	6 March 2014	226 days	12 years, 136 days	--	
U. N. Singh	Meghalaya	22 October 2001	27 Aug 2014 – 18 Mar 2015	14 January 2016	204 days	14 years, 85 days	Became permanent	
Ajit Singh	Rajasthan	1 April 2002	23 Aug 2015 – 4 Mar 2016	5 September 2018	196 days	16 years, 158 days	Elevated as CJ of Gauhati	
Rajendra Menon	Madhya Pradesh	1 April 2002	13 May 2016 – 14 Mar 2017	6 June 2019	306 days	17 years, 67 days	Elevated as CJ of Patna	
S. K. Seth	Madhya Pradesh	21 March 2003	15 Mar 2017 – 18 Mar 2017	9 June 2019	3 days	16 years, 81 days	--	
S. K. Seth	Madhya Pradesh	21 March 2003	2 Nov 2018 – 13 Nov 2018	9 June 2019	12 days	16 years, 81 days	Became permanent	
R. S. Jha	Madhya Pradesh	18 October 2005	10 Jun 2019 – 5 Oct 2019	13 October 2023	118 days	17 years, 361 days	Elevated as CJ of Punjab & Haryana	
Sanjay Yadav	Madhya Pradesh	2 March 2007	6 Oct 2019 – 2 Nov 2019	25 June 2021	28 days	14 years, 116 days	--	
Sanjay Yadav	Madhya Pradesh	2 March 2007	30 Sep 2020 – 2 Jan 2021	25 June 2021	42 days	14 years, 116 days	Transferred to Allahabad	
Sanjay Yadav	Allahabad	2 March 2007	14 Apr 2021 – 12 Jun 2021	25 June 2021	60 days	14 years, 116 days	Became permanent	
S. C. Sharma	Karnataka	18 January 2008	31 Aug 2021 – 10 Oct 2021	8 November 2023^{[‡]}	41 days	15 years, 295 days	Elevated as CJ of Telangana	
Alok Aradhe	Jammu & Kashmir	29 December 2009	11 May 2018 – 10 Aug 2018	28 August 2025^{[‡]}	92 days	15 years, 243 days	--	
Alok Aradhe	Karnataka	29 December 2009	3 Jul 2022 – 14 Oct 2022	28 August 2025^{[‡]}	104 days	15 years, 243 days	--	
Sheel Nagu	Madhya Pradesh	27 May 2011	25 May 2024 – 8 Jul 2024	1 June 2026^{[‡]}	45 days	15 years, 6 days	Elevated as CJ of Punjab & Haryana	
Sujoy Paul	Telangana	27 May 2011	21 Jan 2025 – 17 Jul 2025	20 June 2026	178 days	15 years, 25 days	Transferred to Calcutta	
Sujoy Paul	Calcutta	27 May 2011	8 Oct 2025 – 15 Jan 2026	20 June 2026	100 days	15 years, 25 days	Became permanent	
Vivek Rusia	Madhya Pradesh	7 April 2016	2 Jun 2026 – 9 Sep 2026	Incumbent	100 days	10 years, 215 days	--	

== Judges elevated to Supreme Court ==
This section includes the list of only those judges whose parent high court was Madhya Pradesh. This includes those judges who, at the time of elevation to Supreme Court of India, may not be serving in Madhya Pradesh High Court but this list does not include judges who at the time of elevation were serving in Madhya Pradesh High Court but does not have Madhya Pradesh as their Parent High Court.

Colour Key

- Female Judge
- Served as Chief Justice of India

Symbol Key

- ^{RES} Resigned
- ^{†} Died in office

#	Name of the Judge	Image	Date of Appointment		Date of Retirement	Tenure			Immediately preceding office
#	Name of the Judge	Image	In Parent High Court	In Supreme Court	Date of Retirement	In High Court(s)	In Supreme Court	Total tenure (Note: Includes both tenure as High Court Judge as well as Supreme Court Judge)	Immediately preceding office
1	Ananda Prakash Sen		7 November 1967	17 July 1978	19 September 1988	10 years, 252 days	10 years, 65 days	20 years, 318 days	7th CJ of Madhya Pradesh HC
2	Goverdhan Lal Oza		29 July 1968	29 October 1985	11 December 1989	17 years, 90 days	4 years, 44 days	21 years, 136 days	9th CJ of Madhya Pradesh HC
3	J. S. Verma		12 September 1972	3 June 1989	17 January 1998	16 years, 264 days	8 years, 229 days	25 years, 128 days	16th CJ of Rajasthan HC
4	Faizanuddin		27 November 1978	14 December 1993	4 February 1997	15 years, 17 days	3 years, 53 days	18 years, 70 days	Judge of Madhya Pradesh HC
5	Ramesh Chandra Lahoti		3 May 1988	9 December 1998	31 October 2005	10 years, 220 days	6 years, 327 days	17 years, 182 days	Judge of Delhi HC
6	Devdatta Madhav Dharmadhikari		24 March 1989	5 March 2002	13 August 2005	12 years, 346 days	3 years, 162 days	16 years, 143 days	17th CJ of Gujarat HC
7	Prakash Prabhakar Naolekar		15 June 1992	27 August 2004	29 June 2008	12 years, 73 days	3 years, 308 days	16 years, 15 days	28th CJ of Gauhati HC
8	Deepak Verma		15 December 1994	11 May 2009	28 August 2012	14 years, 147 days	3 years, 110 days	17 years, 258 days	28th CJ of Rajasthan HC
9	Arun Kumar Mishra		25 October 1999	7 July 2014	2 September 2020	14 years, 255 days	6 years, 58 days	20 years, 314 days	36th CJ of Calcutta HC
10	Abhay Manohar Sapre		25 October 1999	13 August 2014	27 August 2019	14 years, 292 days	5 years, 15 days	19 years, 307 days	33rd CJ of Gauhati HC
11	Jitendra Kumar Maheshwari		25 November 2005	31 August 2021	28 June 2026	15 years, 279 days	4 years, 302 days	20 years, 216 days	22nd CJ of Sikkim HC
12	Satish Chandra Sharma		18 January 2008	9 November 2023	Incumbent	15 years, 295 days	2 years, 364 days	18 years, 294 days	32nd CJ of Delhi HC
13	Alok Aradhe		29 December 2009	29 August 2025	Incumbent	15 years, 243 days	1 year, 71 days	16 years, 314 days	48th CJ of Bombay HC
14	Sheel Nagu		27 May 2011	2 June 2026	Incumbent	15 years, 6 days	159 days	15 years, 165 days	36th CJ of Punjab & Haryana HC

== Judges from erstwhile Nagpur High Court ==
=== Elevated as Chief Justices ===
This sections contains list of only those judges elevated as chief justices whose parent high court is Nagpur. This includes those judges who, at the time of appointment as chief justice, may not be serving in Nagpur High Court but this list does not include judges who at the time of appointment as chief justice were serving in Nagpur High Court but does not have Nagpur as their Parent High Court.

Colour Key

- Female Chief Justice
- Served as Chief Justice of India

Symbol Key

- ^{‡} Elevated to Supreme Court of India
- ^{RES} Resigned
- ^{†} Died in office

Name	Image	Appointed as CJ in HC of	Date of appointment		Date of retirement (Note: this includes date of resignation, death and elevation to supreme court)	Tenure		Ref..
Name	Image	Appointed as CJ in HC of	As Judge	As Chief Justice	Date of retirement	As Chief Justice	As Judge (Note: also includes tenure as Chief Justice)	Ref..
Vivian Bose		Nagpur	9 January 1936	20 February 1949	5 March 1951^{[‡]}	2 years, 13 days	15 years, 55 days	
Mohammad Hidayatullah		Nagpur, transferred to Madhya Pradesh	27 June 1946	3 December 1954	30 November 1958^{[‡]}	3 years, 363 days	12 years, 157 days	
Ganesh Prasad Bhutt		Madhya Pradesh	10 February 1953	13 December 1958	22 September 1959	284 days	6 years, 225 days	
Yeshwant Shripad Tambe		Bombay	8 February 1954	7 February 1966	31 July 1966	175 days	12 years, 174 days	
Sohrab Peshotan Kotval		Bombay	18 August 1955	1 August 1966	27 September 1972	6 years, 58 days	17 years, 41 days	

=== Elevated to Supreme Court ===
This section includes the list of only those judges whose parent high court was Nagpur. This includes those judges who, at the time of elevation to Supreme Court of India, may not be serving in Nagpur High Court but this list does not include judges who at the time of elevation were serving in Nagpur High Court but does not have Nagpur as their Parent High Court.

Colour Key

- Female Judge
- Served as Chief Justice of India

Symbol Key

- ^{RES} Resigned
- ^{†} Died in office

#	Name of the Judge	Image	Date of Appointment		Date of Retirement	Tenure			Immediately preceding office
#	Name of the Judge	Image	In Parent High Court	In Supreme Court	Date of Retirement	In High Court(s)	In Supreme Court	Total tenure (Note: Includes both tenure as High Court Judge as well as Supreme Court Judge)	Immediately preceding office
1	Vivian Bose		9 January 1936	5 March 1951	8 June 1956	15 years, 55 days	5 years, 96 days	20 years, 152 days	CJ in same High Court
2	Mohammad Hidayatullah		27 June 1946	1 December 1958	16 December 1970	12 years, 157 days	12 years, 16 days	24 years, 173 days	1st CJ of Madhya Pradesh HC
3	Janardan Raghunath Mudholkar		21 June 1948	3 October 1960	3 July 1966^{[RES]}	12 years, 104 days	5 years, 274 days	18 years, 13 days	Judge of Bombay HC

== See also ==
- High Courts of India
