= List of judges of the Rajasthan High Court =

This is the list of justices of Rajasthan High Court since its inception on 29 August 1949.

1. Naval Kishore from 29.08.1949 to 03.11.1951
2. K. L. Bapna from 29.08.1949 to 04.01.1960
3. Jawan Singh Ranawat from 29.08.1949 to 10.10.1961
4. Kshem Chandra Gupta from 29.08.1949 to N.A.
5. Trilochan Dutta from 29.08.1949 to N.A.
6. K. Amar Singh from 29.08.1949 to 30.06.1950
7. Sardool Singh Mehta from 29.08.1949 to N.A.
8. Mohammad Ibrahim from 29.08.1949 to 18.07.1950
9. Durga Shakti Dave from 29.08.1949 to 12.07.1952 25.01.1951 to 31.05.1963
10. Kumar Krishna Sharma from 29.08.1949 to 25.01.1951 15.06.1951 to 12.03.1959
11. Anand Narain Kaul from 29.08.1949 to 31.03.1950
12. Indernath Modi from 29.01.1953 to 28.02.1967
13. Daulat Mal Bhandari from 26.07.1955 to 17.12.1968
14. Jagat Narain from 20.01.1958 to 15.12.1969
15. L. N. Chhangani from 01.09.1959 to 12.10.1972
16. C. B. Bhargava from 01.02.1960 to 12.11.1971
17. Bhagwati Prasad Beri from 16.08.1960 to 13.02.1973
18. Prakash Narain Singhal from 21.06.1961 to 16.02.1975
19. Vedpal Tyagi from 13.09.1962 to 05.11.1975
20. Kan Singh Parihar from 08.08.1964 to 29.08.1975
21. Lehar Singh Mehta from 01.03.1967 to 11.08.1973
22. Chand Mal Lodha from 22.11.1967 to 27.06.1976
23. Gopal Mal Mehta from 23.11.1967 to 03.09.1968
24. S. N. Modi from 01.03.1969 to 06.11.1977
25. R. D. Gattani from 26.02.1970 to 31.01.1974
26. Jagdish Prasad Jain from 12.08.1970 to 17.09.1975
27. Mohan Lal Joshi from 22.11.1971 to 30.06.1979
28. K. D. Sharma from 20.07.1973 to 06.01.1981
29. Dwarka Prasad Gupta from 24.09.1973 to 11.04.1986
30. M. L. Shrimal from 07.10.1974 to 17.12.1983
31. Mangilal Jain from 01.07.1975 to 23.07.1978
32. Purushottam Das Kudal from 01.07.1975 to 19.10.1982
33. Rajinder Sachar from 10.05.1976 to 08.07.1977
34. A. P. Sen from 20.06.1976 to 27.02.1978
35. Ramji Lal Gupta from 02.09.1976 to 09.08.1978
36. Ananda Prakash Sen from 16.02.1977 to 12.05.1977
37. Guman Mal Lodha from 01.05.1978 to 28.02.1988
38. Shrikrishnamal Lodha from 01.05.1978 to 27.06.1986
39. Narendra Mohan Kasliwal from 15.06.1978 to 28.03.1989
40. Milap Chand Jain from 15.06.1978 to 14.04.1990
41. Suresh Chandra Agarwal from 15.06.1978 to 10.01.1990
42. Kashmir Singh Sidhu from 20.07.1978 to 08.03.1985
43. Kumari Kanta Bhatnagar from 26.09.1978 to 14.06.1992
44. Mahendra Bhushan Sharma from 25.11.1978 to 24.06.1982
45. Suraj Narain Didwania from 25.11.1978 to 24.06.1981
46. Surendra Nath Bhargava from 20.10.1982 to 19.01.1993
47. Dinkar Lal Mehta from 29.10.1982 to 04.01.1992
48. Kishore Singh Lodha from 04.04.1983 to 29.06.1990
49. Gopal Krishna Sharma from 04.04.1983 to 06.02.1990
50. Shyam Sunder Byas from 09.05.1983 to 30.04.1990
51. Vinod Shanker Dave from 12.06.1984 to 15.02.1994
52. Mahendra Bhushan Sharma from 13.07.1985 to 29.09.1993
53. Jasraj Chopra from 13.07.1985 to 19.08.1995
54. Pana Chand Jain from 13.07.1985 to 18.03.1989
55. Shobhag Mal Jain from 13.07.1985 to 07.10.1990
56. Inder Sen Israni from 13.07.1985 to 15.04.1993
57. Farooq Hasan from 13.07.1985 to 31.12.1994
58. Mohini Kapoor from 13.07.1985 to 17.11.1995
59. Ashok Kumar Mathur from 13.07.1985 to 17.02.1994 | Transferred to Madhya Pradesh High Court
60. Naveen Chandra Sharma from 27.10.1986 to 09.09.1992
61. Milap Chandra Jain from 30.06.1987 to 18.12.1994
62. Ranveer Sahai Verma from 26.12.1987 to 07.01.1995
63. N. C. Kochhar from 17.06.1988 to 25.03.1997
64. Ram Saharan Kejriwal from 20.07.1990 to 03.07.1997
65. Balwant Roy Arora from 20.07.1990 to 14.08.1997
66. Navrang Lal Tibrewal from 20.07.1990 to 16.01.1999
67. Nagendra Kumar Jain from 20.07.1990 to 18.12.1997 | Transferred to Madras High Court & Chief Justice of Madras High Court on 13.09.2000 & again | Transferred to Karnataka High Court on 11.05.1994
68. Magraj Khalla from 20.07.1990 to 27.04.1994 10.09.2001 to 12.03.2003
69. Ganpat Singh Singhvi from 20.07.1990 to 27.04.1994 | Transferred to Punjab and Haryana High Court
70. Y. R. Meena from 20.07.1990 to 21.12.1997 01.11.2001 to N.A. | Transferred to Calcutta High Court & again to Rajasthan High Court
71. Virendra Kumar Singhal from 21.10.1991 to 14.12.1997
72. Rajesh Balia from 21.10.1991 to 13.12.1999 23.06.1994 to N.A. Appointed as Chief Justice of Patna High Court 05.01.2008
73. Rajendra Prasad Saxena from 21.10.1991 to 31.05.1998
74. V. K. Bali from 28.02.2005 to 21.01.2006 | Transferred from Punjab and Haryana High Court
75. Anshuman Singh from 28.04.1994 to 06.07.1997 | Transferred from Allahabad High Court
76. Maheshwari Prasad Singh from 28.04.1994 to 09.04.1998 | Transferred from Allahabad High Court and Again to Allahabad High Court
77. Vishnu Sadashiv Kokje from 28.04.1994 to 06.09.2001 | Transferred from Madhya Pradesh High Court
78. B. J. Shethna from 28.10.1994 to 03.06.2001
79. P. P. Naolekar from 28.04.1994 to 09.06.2002 | Transferred from Madhya Pradesh High Court
80. Arun Madan from 24.02.1994 to 21.03.2003 | Transferred from Delhi High Court
81. V. G. Palshikar from 14.02.1994 to 31.05.2001 | Transferred from Bombay High Court
82. Shiv Kishore Keshote from 31.01.1994 to 16.02.1994 28.05.2001 to 01.01.2006
83. N. N. Mathur from 31.01.1994 to 14.02.1994 25.02.1999 to N.A. Retired on 20.02.2007
84. Rajendra Mal Lodha from 31.01.1994 to 15.02.1994 | Transferred to Bombay High Court & appointed as Chief Justice of Patna High Court on 13.05.2008
85. Om Prakash Jain from 31.01.1994 to 16.02.1994 | Transferred to Allahabad High Court on 17.02.1994
86. R. R. Yadav from 15.02.1994 to 31.05.2001 | Transferred from Allahabad High Court & Transferred back to Allahabad High Court 01.06.2001
87. Prem Krishan Palli from 01.03.1994 to 26.03.1996 | Transferred from Punjab and Haryana High Court & | Transferred to Himachal Pradesh High Court
88. Gyan Sudha Misra from 21.04.1994 | Transferred from Patna High Court appointed as Chief Justice of Jharkhand High Court on 13.07.2008
89. A. P. Ravani from 25.02.1995 to 03.04.1995
90. Prem Chand Jain from 22.07.1995 to 11.09.1998
91. Dinesh Chandra Dalela from 22.07.1995 to 20.05.1999
92. P. K. Tewari from 22.07.1995 to 17.07.2000
93. G. L. Gupta from 22.07.1995 to 09.11.2000
94. M. A. A. Khan from 22.07.1995 to 06.01.2000
95. M. G. Mukherjee from 23.02.1996 to 18.09.1996 | Transferred from Calcutta High Court
96. Jogindra Singh Siddhu from 11.10.1996 to 29.01.1999 | Transferred from Punjab and Haryana High Court then to Allahabad High Court and the Rajasthan High Court
97. Shiv Kumar Sharma from 06.04.1996 to 10.10.2008
98. Bhagwati Prasad from 06.04.1996 - | Transferred to Gujarat High Court on 07.02.2008
99. A. K. Parihar from 06.04.1996 to 24.08.2009
100. S. C. Mittal from 06.04.1996 to 12.08.2000
101. Amar Singh Godara from 06.04.1996 to 01.05.1999
102. Mohd. Yamin from 06.04.1996 to 03.07.2001
103. A. K. Singh from 06.04.1996 to 14.08.2000
104. Nand Kumar Agarwal from 06.04.1996 to 28.04.1996 | Transferred to Punjab and Haryana High Court
105. Jagdish Chandra Verma from 14.05.1996 to 15.12.2001
106. B. S. Chouhan from 17.07.1997 to 13.03.2003 | Transferred from Allahabad High Court
107. A. M. Kapadia from 11.12.1997 to 04.03.2011 | Transferred from Gujarat High Court
108. P. B. Majumdar from 17.09.1999 to 09.09.2012 | Transferred from Gujarat High Court & again | Transferred to Bombay High Court 28.05.08
109. Abhay Manohar Sapre from 25.10.1999 to 28.08.2016 | Transferred from Madhya Pradesh & Transferred to Chhattisgarh High Court 23.04.12
110. Arun Kumar Mishra from 25.10.1999 to 03.09.2017 | Transferred from Madhya Pradesh High Court & again to Calcutta High Court 14.12.12
111. N. P. Gupta from 20.01.2000 to 20.01.2010
112. D. N. Joshi from 20.01.2000 to 11.10.2003
113. S. K. Garg from 29.03.2000 to 20.02.2005 until Resigned
114. K. S. Rathore from 30.10.2000 to 14.04.2010
115. Rattan Chand Gandhi from 17.01.2001 to 21.01.2010 | Transferred from Jammu and Kashmir High Court
116. Prakash Chandra Tatia from 11.01.2001 to 04.08.2013
117. H. R. Panwar from 11.01.2001 to 10.02.2010
118. Khem Chand Sharma from 11.01.2001 to 07.08.2010
119. Shashikant Sharma from 11.01.2001 to 16.06.2006
120. Jagat Singh from 01.03.2001 to 28.02.2003
121. O. P. Bishnoi from 29.08.2001 to 10.07.2004
122. Anoop Chand Goyal from 29.08.2001 to 25.02.2005
123. Harbans Lal from 29.08.2001 to 12.03.2007
124. K. K. Acharya from 05.03.2002 to 08.08.2008
125. F. C. Bansal from 05.03.2002 to 01.01.2006
126. Dalip Singh from 02.09.2004 to 18.11.2012
127. Narendra Kumar Jain from 02.09.2004 to 08.10.2014
128. Rajendra Prasad Vyas from 02.09.2004 - Died on 27.10.2006
129. Dinesh Maheshwari from 02.09.2004 to 18.07.2014 | Transferred to Allahabad High Court
130. Jitendra Rai Goyal from 02.02.2005 to 04.04.2010
131. Manak Lal Mohta from 02.02.2005 to 01.07.2009
132. Suresh Chandra Singhal from 02.02.2005 to 08.03.2005 Died
133. Satyaprakash Pathak from 02.02.2005 to 15.12.2010
134. Prem Shanker Asopa from 13.06.2005 to 30.09.2013
135. Chatra Ram Jat from 20.01.2006 to 01.09.2008
136. Gauri Shanker Sarraf from 20.01.2006 to 01.07.2010
137. Guman Singh to 06.02.2010
138. Bhanwaroo Khan to 10.07.2009
139. Deo Narayan Thanvi to 03.06.2010
140. Kishan Swaroop Chaudhari from 15.04.2008 to 30.06.2010
141. C. M. Totla from 15.04.2008 to 28.04.2012
142. M. C. Bhagwati from 15.04.2008 to 10.06.2012
143. Meena V. Gomber from 29.09.2009 to 30.07.2013
144. Kailash Chandra Joshi from 24.05.2010 to 15.05.2012
145. Sajjan Singh Kothari from 24.05.2010 to 10.10.2012
146. Narendra Kumar Jain from 28.04.2011 to 15.04.2014
147. Raghvendra S. Chauhan from 13.06.2005 to 09.03.2015 | Transferred to Karnataka High Court
148. Vishnu Kumar Mathur from 21.01.2013 to 01.04.2015
149. Raghuvendra Singh Rathore from 05.07.2007 to 30.06.2015
150. Atul Kumar Jain from 16.01.2013 to 27.08.2015
151. Nisha Gupta from 28.04.2011 to 12.09.2015

== See also ==
- List of chief justices of the Rajasthan High Court
