= 1998 in India =

- Centuries: 18th; 19th; 20th; 21st
- Decades: 1970s; 1980s; 1990s; 2000s; 2010s
- See also: List of years in India; Timeline of Indian history

Events in the year 1998 in the Republic of India.

== Incumbents ==
- President of India – K. R. Narayanan
- Prime Minister of India – Inder Kumar Gujral until 19 March, Atal Bihari Vajpayee
- Vice President of India – Krishna Kant
- Chief Justice of India –
  - until 17 January – Jagdish Sharan Verma
  - 18 January-9 October – Madan Mohan Punchhi
  - starting 10 October – Adarsh Sein Anand

=== Governors ===
- Andhra Pradesh – C. Rangarajan
- Arunachal Pradesh – Mata Prasad
- Assam – Srinivas Kumar Sinha
- Bihar – Akhlaqur Rahman Kidwai (until 27 April), Sunder Singh Bhandari (starting 27 April)
- Goa –
  - until 15 January: P.C. Alexander
  - 15 January-18 April: T. R. Satish Chandran
  - starting 18 April: J. F. R. Jacob
- Gujarat – Krishna Pal Singh (until 25 April), Anshuman Singh (starting 25 April)
- Haryana – Mahabir Prasad
- Himachal Pradesh – V. S. Ramadevi
- Jammu and Kashmir – K. V. Krishna Rao (until 2 May), Girish Chandra Saxena (starting 2 May)
- Karnataka – Khurshed Alam Khan
- Kerala – Sukhdev Singh Kang
- Madhya Pradesh – Mohammad Shafi Qureshi (until 21 April), Bhai Mahavir (starting 21 April)
- Maharashtra – P.C. Alexander
- Manipur – O.N. Shrivastava
- Meghalaya – M.M. Jacob
- Mizoram –
  - until 28 January: P. R. Kyndiah
  - 28 January-1 May: Arun Prasad Mukherjee
  - starting 1 May: A. Padmanabhan
- Nagaland – Om Prakash Sharma
- Odisha – K. V. Raghunatha Reddy (until 27 April), C. Rangarajan (starting 27 April)
- Punjab – Bakshi Krishan Nath Chhibber
- Rajasthan –
  - until 1 May: Bali Ram Bhagat
  - 1 May-24 May: Darbara Singh
  - starting 25 May: Navrang Lal Tibrewal
- Sikkim – Chaudhary Randhir Singh
- Tamil Nadu – M. Fathima Beevi
- Tripura – Siddheswar Prasad
- Uttar Pradesh –
  - until 17 March: Romesh Bhandari
  - 17 March-19 April: Mohammad Shafi Qureshi
  - starting 19 April: Suraj Bhan
- West Bengal – K. V. Raghunatha Reddy (until 27 April), Akhlaqur Rahman Kidwai (starting 27 April)

== Events ==
- National income - ₹17,722,970 million

=== January - April ===
- 1 January – The Election Commission announces 16 February as the starting date of the general elections.
- 11 January – Sonia Gandhi launches her election campaign at Sriperumbudur, where her husband was assassinated.
- 21 January – The crime/thriller series, CID started on Sony Channel
- 14–15 February – 1998 Coimbatore bombings. A series of car bombs kill at least 60 people and wound more than 200 in the southern city of Coimbatore, coinciding with the schedule of Bharatiya Janata Party (BJP) president Lal Krishna Advani's campaign in the city.
- 16 February – More than 100 million Indians cast their votes for 222 seats in the first phase of the general election. At least 21 people die in scattered violence.
- 21 February – The Hindu nationalist BJP is ousted from power in Uttar Pradesh State after a coalition ally withdrew its support. On 23 February, a bitter court battle restores the BJP-led government to power.
- 22 February – The second phase of general elections is held for 184 seats.
- 26 February – The BJP wins a vote of confidence in Uttar Pradesh.
- 28 February – In the third major phase of general elections, the electorate votes for 131 seats.
- 2 March – The counting of votes begins after elections marred by violence in which at least 150 were killed. The BJP and their allies emerge as the single largest political formation with 251 seats, the Indian National Congress and its allies winning 166 and the United Front 96.
- 3 March – Congress says it is willing to form a government with the United Front's support to stop the BJP from ruling.
- 7 March – The BJP crowns Atal Bihari Vajpayee as prime minister-aspirant.
- 9 March – Sitaram Kesri resigns as Congress president. On 14 March Sonia Gandhi is elected to the post.
- 10 March – The Election Commission constitutes the lower house with 539 members. The BJP and its allies form the single largest group.
- 10 March – The president asks Vajpayee whether he is "able and willing" to form a government; he seeks proof of support from allies.
- 12 March – A regional ally, the All India Anna Dravida Munnetra Kazhagam (AIADMK), withholds support from the BJP.
- 14 March –
  - The AIADMK agrees to support the BJP but says it will not join its planned government.
  - Sitaram Kesri is unceremoniously removed as head of Indian National Congress.
- 15 March – Sonia Gandhi says Congress does not have the support to stake a claim to rule. The AIADMK agrees to join a BJP-led government. The president invites Vajpayee to form a government and take the oath as prime minister on 19 March and gives him ten more days to prove his parliamentary majority.
- 19 March – Vajpayee takes office after assembling a diverse cabinet reflecting his 13-party coalition.
- 28 March – The BJP-led coalition wins a parliamentary confidence vote by 13 votes thanks to last-minute backing from the regional Telugu Desam Party.
- 14 April – The BJP unanimously elects senior leader Khushabhau Thakre as its new president. Thakre formally takes over in early May from Lal Krishna Advani, who is widely credited with crafting the political strategy that took the BJP from obscurity to power.
- 19 April – Jayaram Jayalalitha, leader of key coalition partner AIADMK, demands the removal of three ministers facing graft charges. The communications minister is sacked.

=== May - August ===
- 11 May – India conducts 3 underground nuclear tests in Pokhran, including 1 thermonuclear device.
- 13 May – India carries out 2 more nuclear tests at Pokhran. The United States and Japan impose economic sanctions on India.
- 1 June – Finance Minister Yashwant Sinha presents a budget for 1998–99 (April–March) which sends stock markets lower. Under pressure from industry and markets, the government makes some embarrassing rollbacks on its budget proposals.
- 6 June – The UN Security Council votes unanimously to condemn India and Pakistan for their nuclear weapons tests.
- 9 June – Over 1,120 people are killed when a cyclone hits coastal areas of the western state of Gujarat.
- 19 June – Separatist guerrillas shoot dead 25 members of a Hindu wedding party at Chapnari village in the Doda District of Jammu and Kashmir State – 1998 Chapnari massacre.
- 20 July – Jayalalitha launches another salvo against the coalition government, giving it a two-day ultimatum to implement a Supreme Court ruling on supply of river water to her southern state of Tamil Nadu or face "disastrous consequences".
- 4 August – Guerrillas in Kashmir kill 19 people as cross-border firing by the Indian and Pakistani armies runs into its sixth day. On 5 August, at least 104 people are reported dead.
- 7 August – The AIADMK decides to continue its support after a water-sharing deal is struck between four southern provinces.
- 9 August – In Kashmir, separatist Ali Mohammad Dar, the self-styled deputy supreme commander of the banned Hizbul Mujahideen, is killed in a gunbattle with Indian police.
- 10 August – A further 19 people die as violence flares across the disputed region.

=== September - December ===
- 25 September – President K.R. Narayanan deals a blow to the Indian cabinet, urging it to review its recommendation to fire the government in the crime-plagued eastern state of Bihar.
- 18 October – Pakistan and India end their first peace talks in a year with agreement to meet again next February in New Delhi.
- 6 November – The first talks between India and Pakistan since 1992 over the disputed Siachen glacier end when Pakistan rejects an Indian proposal for a ceasefire.
- 26 November – A passenger train rams into another train in the northern Indian state of Punjab, killing at least 201 people.
- 29 November – The BJP pays a heavy price for its failure to halt a surge in the price of food items, especially onions, losing local elections to the main opposition Congress party in the key Hindi heartland states of Delhi and Rajasthan and failing to wrest control of the central state of Madhya Pradesh.
- 29 December – A major communal riot erupted in Surathkal near Mangalore, Karnataka. The unrest continued for about a week and 8 people were killed.
- 30 December – Defence Minister George Fernandes sacks Naval Chief Admiral Vishnu Bhagwat, triggering controversy.
- The National Highway Development Project is launched.
- Netaji Subhas Open University started functioning in Kolkata, West Bengal.

== Births ==
- 2 January - Avinash Kumar, Radio Frequency Engineer
- 12 January - Kiran Sonwane, Mechanical Engineer
- 5 February – Sreelakshmi Suresh, student of Presentation High Secondary School in Kozhikode, Kerala
- 22 March – Harsh Mayar, actor
- 28 March - Aniket Shrivastava, Mechanical Engineer, Entrepreneur
- 14 May – Taruni Sachdev, actress (d. 2012)
- 28 May – Manibalan Soundararajan, Medical Representative in Tamilnadu
- 5 June – Hemant Brijwasi, singer
- 21 June - Harleen Deol, cricketer
- 12 July – Swini Khara, actress
- 18 July - Ishan Kishan, cricketer.
- 10 August – Diptayan Ghosh, chess player
- 28 September – Anukreethy Vas, model
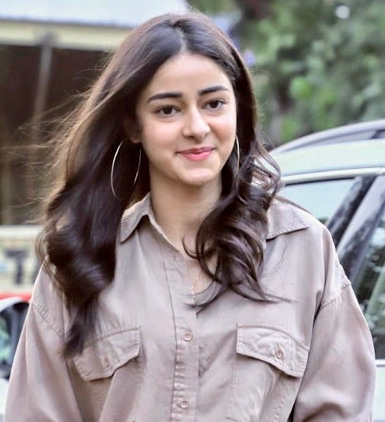
- Ananya Panday
  30 October - Ananya Panday, actress
- 12 November - Liston Colaco, football player
- 16 November – Priyanshi Somani, mental calculator
- 20 November - Deependra Negi, football player
- 1 December – Ishita Panchal, actress
- 12 December – Raju Guldai, football player
- 14 December – Riya Vij, actress
- 23 December - Poorvi Shrivastava,
- 24 December – Eisha Singh, actress

=== Full date unknown ===
- Azharuddin Mohammed Ismail, actor
- Swapnali Yadav

== Deaths ==
- 15 January – Gulzarilal Nanda, Interim Prime Minister of India, Politician (b. 1898).
- 23 February – Raman Lamba, Indian cricketer (b. 1960).
- 19 May – Leela Devi, writer, translator and teacher (b. 1932).
- 4 June – Aarudhra, author, poet and historian (b. 1925).
- 18 August – Persis Khambatta, actress and model (b. 1948).
- 16 September – Mazhar Khan, actor, producer and director (b. 1953).
- 22 October – Ajit Khan, actor (b. 1922).
- 28 October – Ghulam Ahmed, Indian cricket captain (b. 1922).

=== Full date unknown ===
- Attia Hosain, writer, feminist and broadcaster (b. 1913).

== See also ==
- List of Bollywood films of 1998
