= Manindra Mohan Shrivastava =

46th Chief Justice of Madras High Court

Hon'ble Chief Justice (Retd.) Manindra Mohan Shrivastava

46th Chief Justice of Madras High Court
- In office 21 July 2025 – 5 March 2026
- Nominated by: B. R. Gavai
- Appointed by: Droupadi Murmu
- Preceded by: K. R. Shriram
- Succeeded by: S. A. Dharmadhikari

42nd Chief Justice of Rajasthan High Court
- In office 6 February 2024 – 20 July 2025; Acting CJ : 9 November 2023 - 5 February 2024
- Nominated by: D. Y. Chandrachud
- Appointed by: Droupadi Murmu
- Preceded by: A. G. Masih
- Succeeded by: K. R. Shriram

Judge of Rajasthan High Court
- In office 18 October 2021 – 5 February 2024
- Nominated by: N. V. Ramana
- Appointed by: Ram Nath Kovind
- Acting Chief Justice
- In office 6 February 2023 – 29 May 2023
- Appointed by: Droupadi Murmu
- Preceded by: Pankaj Mithal
- Succeeded by: A. G. Masih
- In office 2 August 2022 – 13 October 2022
- Appointed by: Droupadi Murmu
- Preceded by: S. S. Shinde
- Succeeded by: Pankaj Mithal
- In office 7 March 2022 – 20 June 2022
- Appointed by: Ram Nath Kovind
- Preceded by: Akil Kureshi
- Succeeded by: S. S. Shinde

Judge of Chhattisgarh High Court
- In office 10 December 2009 – 17 October 2021
- Nominated by: K. G. Balakrishnan
- Appointed by: Pratibha Patil

Personal details
- Born: 6 March 1964 (age 62) Bilaspur, Chhattisgarh
- Education: B.Sc and LL.B
- Alma mater: K R Law College, Bilaspur, CMD College, Bilaspur

Manindra Mohan Shrivastava (born 6 March 1964) is a retired Indian judge who served as Chief Justice of Madras and Rajasthan High Court. He has previously served as judge and as Acting Chief Justice of the Rajasthan High Court four times before being elevated as Chief Justice in 2024. He is also a former Judge of the Chhattisgarh High Court.

== Early life and career ==
Justice Shrivastava was born on 6 March 1964 in Bilaspur, Chhattisgarh. He completed his graduation in B.Sc from CMD college, Bilaspur and LL. B. from K. R. Law College at Bilaspur. He enrolled with Bar Council of Madhya Pradesh on 5 October 1987 and started practicing in district courts and High Court. He was designated as Senior advocate on 31 January 2005.

He was elevated as additional judge of Chhattisgarh High Court on 10 December 2009 and became permanent on 8 March 2016. He was transferred to Rajasthan High Court on 18 October 2021 where he served as acting chief justice four times in 2022 and 2023 before being elevated as permanent chief justice on 6 February 2024.

On 26 May 2025, the Supreme Court collegium recommended swap between chief justices of Rajasthan High Court and Madras High Court and subsequently he was transferred to Madras High Court and was sworn in as chief justice of Madras High Court on 21 July 2025. He retired as chief justice of Madras High Court on 5 March 2026 on attaining age of superannuation i.e. 62 years.

On 12 August 2025 Om Birla, Speaker of the Lok Sabha constituted 3 member committee consisting Justice Shrivastava, Supreme Court judge Aravind Kumar and senior advocate B.V. Acharya to inquire into the allegations against Justice Yashwant Varma as part of impeachment proceedings.
