= Pankaj Mithal =

Retired Judge of Supreme Court of India

Hon'ble Justice (Retd.) Pankaj Mithal
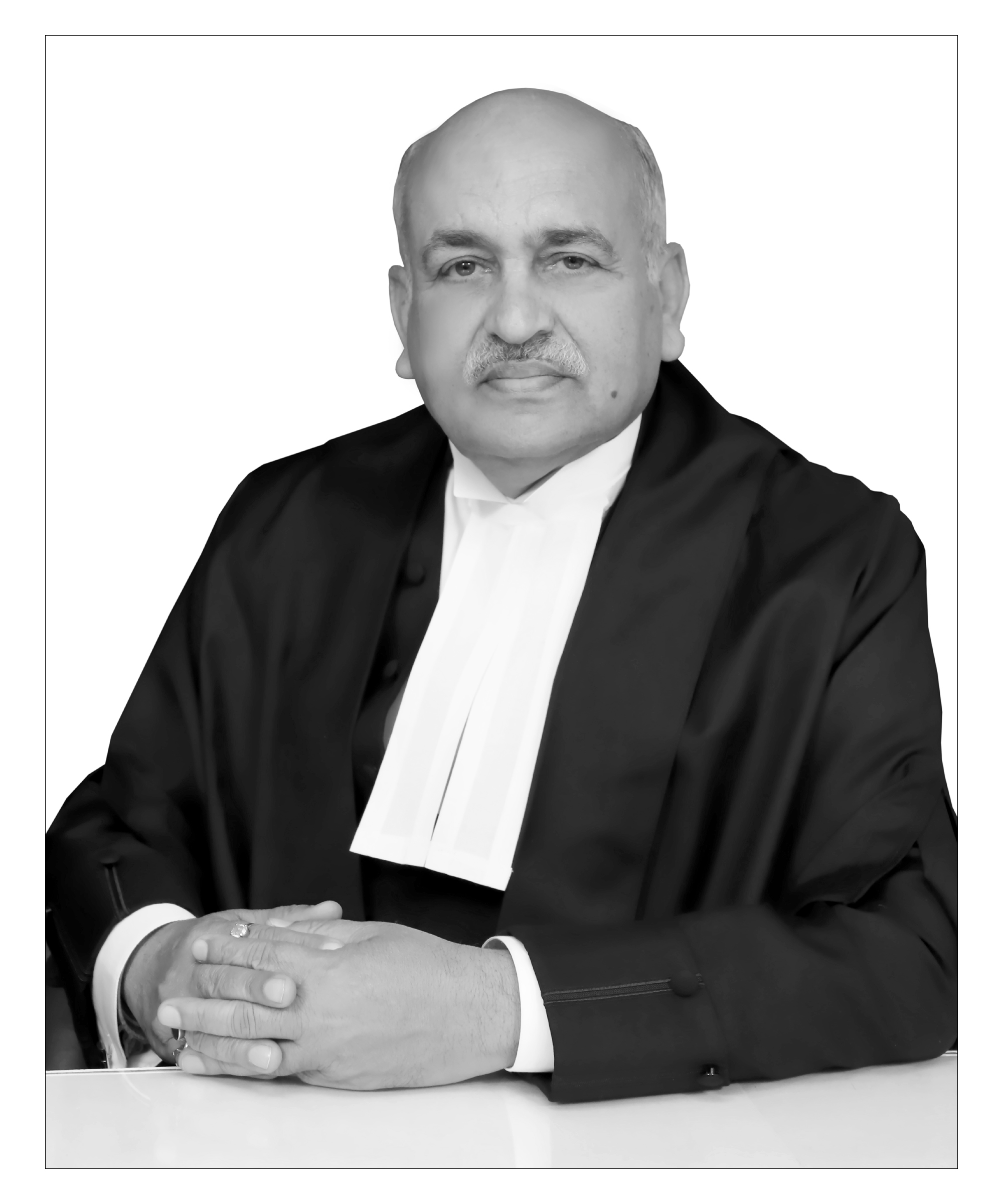

Judge of Supreme Court of India
- In office 6 February 2023 – 16 June 2026
- Nominated by: D. Y. Chandrachud
- Appointed by: Droupadi Murmu

40th Chief Justice of Rajasthan High Court
- In office 14 October 2022 – 5 February 2023
- Nominated by: U. U. Lalit
- Appointed by: Droupadi Murmu
- Preceded by: S. S. Shinde; M. M. Shrivastava (acting)
- Succeeded by: A. G. Masih; M. M. Shrivastava (acting)

34th Chief Justice of Jammu & Kashmir and Ladakh High Court
- In office 4 January 2021 – 13 October 2022
- Nominated by: Sharad Arvind Bobde
- Appointed by: Ram Nath Kovind
- Preceded by: Gita Mittal; Rajesh Bindal (acting)
- Succeeded by: A. M. Magrey

Judge of Allahabad High Court
- In office 7 July 2006 – 3 January 2021
- Nominated by: Y. K. Sabharwal
- Appointed by: A. P. J. Abdul Kalam

Personal details
- Born: 17 June 1961 (age 65) Meerut, Uttar Pradesh, India
- Education: B.Com (Hons.) and LL.B
- Alma mater: St. Mary's Academy, Meerut; University of Allahabad; Meerut College

Pankaj Mithal (born 17 June 1961) is a retired judge of the Supreme Court of India and a former Chief Justice of the Rajasthan High Court. Previously, he has also served as the Chief Justice of the Jammu & Kashmir and Ladakh High Court and Judge of the Allahabad High Court.

== Early life and education ==
He was born in Meerut, Uttar Pradesh, on 17 June 1961, into a family of lawyers. He received his early education at St. Mary's Academy, Meerut, which is affiliated to the Indian School Certificate (I.S.C.) Board. He joined the B.Com. (Honours) at the University of Allahabad and graduated in 1982. Later, he joined Meerut College for his legal studies and obtained his law degree from Chaudhary Charan Singh University, Meerut. He is now living in New Delhi, Delhi.

== Family history ==
His grandfather, Babu Brij Nath Mithal, was a lawyer of western U.P. He was the Honorary Head of the law department at the Meerut College. The Boys Hostel of the law department at Meerut College was named 'B.N.M. Hostel' (Brij Nath Mithal Hostel) in his honour.

His uncle Sri Raghuvar Dayal Mithal (1910-1981) and the eldest son of Brij Nath Mithal were also stalwarts of the Meerut Bar who dominated the civil side for over four decades. He was offered Judgeship of the High Court of Judicature at Allahabad twice, but he declined it for personal reasons.

His father, Justice Narendra Nath Mithal (6 April 1930 – 7 April 1996) was also a leading civil lawyer of the District Court, Meerut. He served as the District Government Counsel (Civil) for several years before being elevated to the Bench at the High Court of Judicature at Allahabad in the year 1978. He was among the few persons who were directly elevated to the Bench from the District Bar. He served as a Judge of High Court of Judicature at Allahabad from 14 December 1978 to 8 April 1992.

== Career ==
He was enrolled in the Bar Council of Uttar Pradesh in 1985 and started practising at the High Court as an advocate.

He served as the Standing Counsel for the Uttar Pradesh Awas Evam Vikas Parishad and Dr. B.R. Ambedkar University, Agra. He was elevated to the Bench as an Additional Judge on 7 July 2006 and was later made a permanent Judge of the High Court of Judicature at Allahabad on 2 July 2008.

He was the Chairman of La Martinière College, Lucknow (both boys' and girls' wings).

He was elevated as Chief Justice of Jammu & Kashmir and Ladakh High Court on 4 January 2021. He was transferred as Chief Justice of Rajasthan High Court on 14 October 2022.

The Governor of Uttar Pradesh nominated Justice Mithal twice as a member of the Executive Council of Mahatma Gandhi Kashi Vidhyapith, Varanasi, and presently, the Governor of U.P. has nominated him as a member of the Executive Council of Choudhary Charan Singh University, Meerut.

He was elevated as Judge of Supreme Court of India on 6 February 2023.
