= Durga Shakti Dave =

5th Chief Justice of Rajasthan High Court

Hon'ble Chief Justice Durga Shakti Dave

5th Chief Justice of Rajasthan High Court
- In office 1 June 1963 – 17 December 1968
- Appointed by: S. Radhakrishnan
- Preceded by: Jawan Singh Ranawat
- Succeeded by: Daulat Mal Bhandari

Judge of Rajasthan High Court
- In office 12 July 1952 – 31 May 1963
- Appointed by: Rajendra Prasad
- In office 29 August 1949 – 25 January 1951
- Appointed by: Sawai Man Singh II

Personal details
- Born: 17 December 1906
- Died: Not known

Durga Shakti Dave was an Indian judge and 5th Chief Justice of Rajasthan High Court.

== Career ==
Dave hails from Bundi in Rajasthan. He was appointed as one of the founding judges of the newly established Rajasthan High Court on 29 August 1949 and served till 25 January 1951. He was again appointed as judge in Rajasthan High Court on 12 July 1952. During his tenure as a puisne judge, he sat primarily at the Jodhpur bench alongside Justice Indra Nath Modi. On 1 June 1963, Dave was elevated to Chief Justice of the Rajasthan High Court in June 1963 succeeding Jawan Singh Ranawat. He retired from the post on 17 December 1968.
