= Govind Mathur =

Former Chief Justice of Allahabad High Court

Hon'ble Chief Justice (Retd.) Govind Mathur

Chief Justice of Allahabad High Court
- In office 14 November 2018 – 13 April 2021
- Nominated by: Ranjan Gogoi
- Appointed by: Ram Nath Kovind

Judge of Allahabad High Court
- In office 21 November 2017 – 13 November 2018
- Nominated by: Dipak Misra
- Appointed by: Ram Nath Kovind

Judge of Rajasthan High Court
- In office 2 September 2004 – 20 November 2017
- Nominated by: Ramesh Chandra Lahoti
- Appointed by: A. P. J. Abdul Kalam

Personal details
- Born: 14 April 1959 (age 66)

Govind Mathur (born 14 April 1959) is a retired Indian judge. He is a former Chief Justice of Allahabad High Court and former judge of Allahabad High Court and Rajasthan High Court.

== Career ==
Hon'ble Mr. Justice Govind Mathur was appointed additional judge of Rajasthan High Court on 2 September 2004. He was promoted to permanent judge on 29 May 2006.

on 21 November 2017 he was transferred to Allahabad High Court.
On 24 October 2018, being the senior most Justice of court, he was appointed acting Chief Justice of the Allahabad High Court. On 10 November 2018, he was appointed Chief Justice of Allahabad High Court.

On 14 November 2018, he took oath as Chief Justice of Allahabad High Court. He retired on 13 April 2021.

Justice Mathur frequently adopted a pro-human rights, pro-privacy, and pro-free speech approach while deciding issues and believed in the Court's duty as a guardian of fundamental rights.
