= List of governors of Rajasthan =

Governors of Indian state of Rajasthan

Governor of Rajasthan
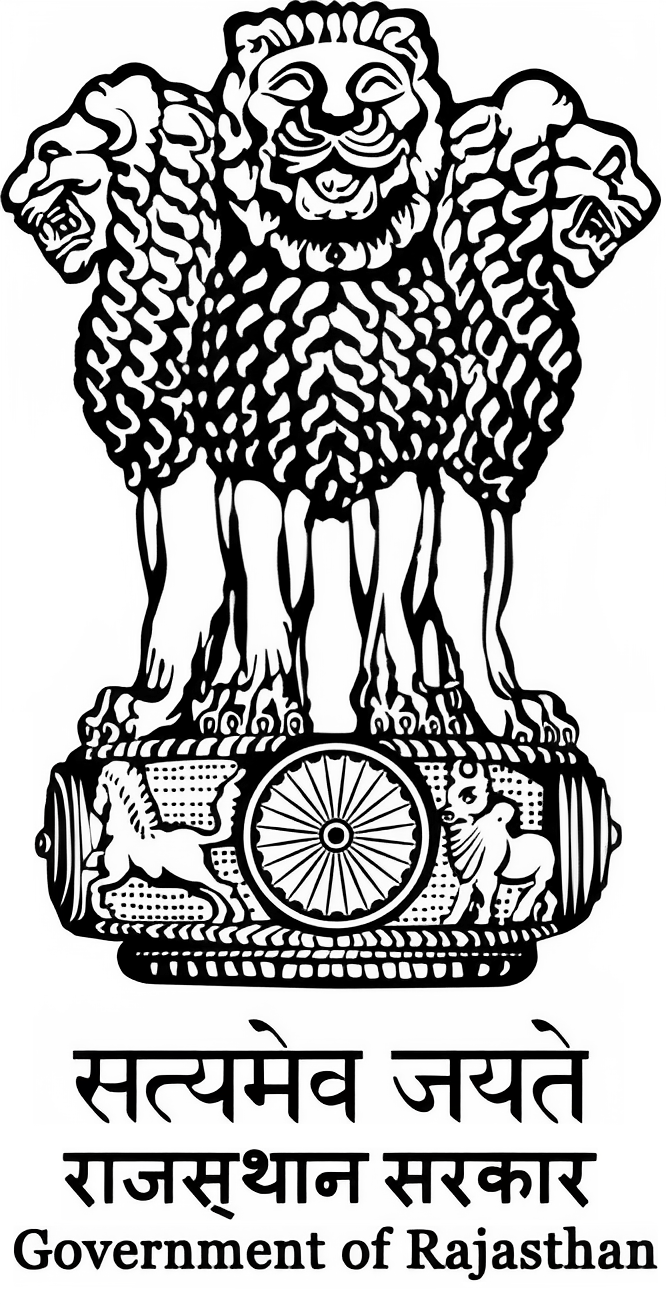
- Emblem of Rajasthan

- Flag of India

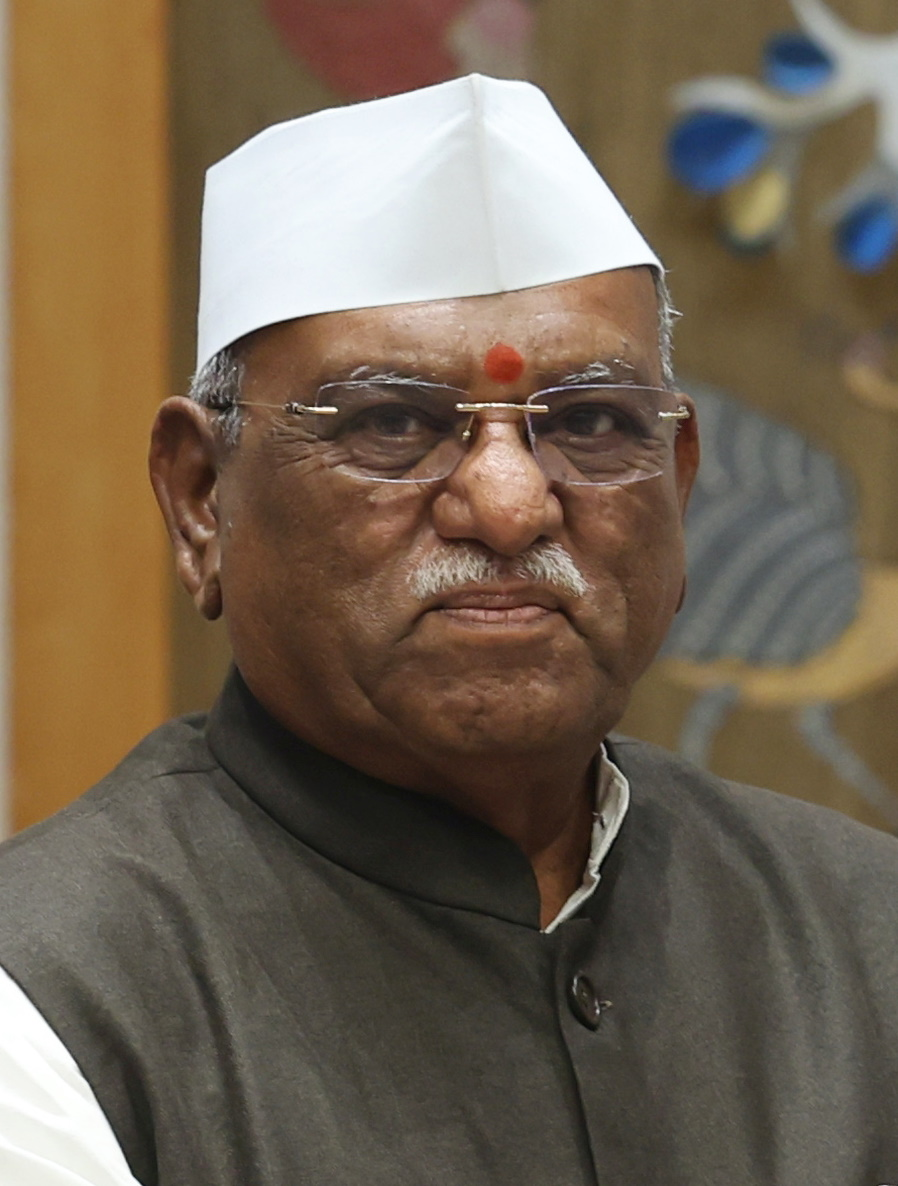
- Incumbent; Haribhau Kisanrao Bagade since 31 July 2024
- Style: Honourable(s.2012)
- Residence: Lok Bhavan; Jaipur
- Appointer: President of India
- Term length: At the pleasure of the president
- Inaugural holder: Maharaj Man Singh II (Rajpramukh)
- Formation: 30 May 1949; 77 years ago
- Website: rajbhawan.rajasthan.gov.in

The governor of Rajasthan is the nominal head of the Indian state of Rajasthan. The governor's powers are mostly ceremonial and the executive powers of the governor are exercised by the chief minister, who is the head of the executive of the state government of Rajasthan. The following is a list of governors of Rajasthan.

Haribhau Kisanrao Bagade is currently serving as the 22nd governor of the state and has been in office since 31 July 2024.

== Predecessor ==
=== Rajpramukhs (1948–1956) ===
Legend

- ^{†} Died in office
- ^{§} Transferred
- ^{‡} Resigned/removed

Color key

- indicates acting/additional charge

#	Portrait	Name (born – died)	Tenure in office			Appointer
#	Portrait	Name (born – died)	From	To	Time in office	Appointer
1		Brigadier His Highness; Shri Maharajadhiraj Maharaja Mahim Mahendra Maharao Raja; Sir Bhim Singh II Bahadur; KCSI (1909–1991); Maharao of Kotah	25 March 1948	18 April 1948	24 days	Lord Mountbatten (Governor-General)
2		Shri Maharana; Sir Bhupal Singh Bahadur; KCIE (1884–1955); Maharana of Udaipur	18 April 1948	1 April 1949	348 days	Lord Mountbatten (Governor-General)
3		Major General Maharaja Sawai; Sir Man Singh II; GCSI GCIE (1912–1970); Maharaja of Jaipur	30 March 1949	31 October 1956	7 years, 215 days	C. Rajagopalachari (Governor-General)

=== Maha-Rajpramukh (1949–1955) ===
#	Portrait	Name (born – died)	Tenure in office			Appointer
#	Portrait	Name (born – died)	From	To	Time in office	Appointer
1		Shri Maharana; Sir Bhupal Singh Bahadur; KCIE (1884–1955); Maharana of Udaipur	1 April 1949	4 July 1955^{[†]}	6 years, 94 days	C. Rajagopalachari (Governor-General)

== Governors (1956–present) ==
Legend

- ^{†} Died in office
- ^{§} Transferred
- ^{‡} Resigned/removed

Color key

- indicates acting/additional charge

#	Portrait	Name (born – died)	Home state	Tenure in office			Appointer (President)
#	Portrait	Name (born – died)	Home state	From	To	Time in office	Appointer (President)
1		Gurmukh Nihal Singh (1895–1969)	Delhi	1 November 1956	16 April 1962	5 years, 166 days	Rajendra Prasad
2		Sampurnanand (1891–1969)	Uttar Pradesh	16 April 1962	16 April 1967	5 years, 0 days	Rajendra Prasad
3		Sardar Hukam Singh (1895–1983)	Punjab	16 April 1967	19 November 1970	3 years, 217 days	Sarvepalli Radhakrishnan
4		Justice; Jagat Narain (Acting)	Rajasthan	20 November 1970	23 December 1970	33 days	V. V. Giri
5		Sardar Hukam Singh (1895–1983)	Punjab	24 December 1970	30 June 1972	1 year, 189 days	V. V. Giri
6		Jogendra Singh (1903–1979)	Uttar Pradesh	1 July 1972	15 February 1977^{[‡]}	4 years, 229 days	V. V. Giri
7		Justice; Vedpal Tyagi (1915–1979) (Acting)	Rajasthan	15 February 1977	11 May 1977	85 days	B. D. Jatti
8		Raghukul Tilak (1900–1989)	Uttar Pradesh	17 May 1977	8 August 1981^{[‡]}	4 years, 83 days	B. D. Jatti
9		Justice; K. D. Sharma (Acting)	Rajasthan	8 August 1981	6 March 1982	210 days	Neelam Sanjiva Reddy
10		Air Chief Marshal; Om Prakash Mehra (Retd); PVSM (1919–2015)	Delhi	6 March 1982	4 January 1985	2 years, 304 days	Neelam Sanjiva Reddy
11		Justice; P. K. Banerjee (Acting)	West Bengal	4 January 1985	31 January 1985	27 days	Zail Singh
(10)		Air Chief Marshal; Om Prakash Mehra (Retd); PVSM (1919–2015)	Delhi	1 February 1985	3 November 1985	275 days	Zail Singh
12		Justice; D. P. Gupta (Acting)	Rajasthan	4 November 1985	19 November 1985	15 days	Zail Singh
13		Vasantdada Patil (1917–1989)	Maharashtra	20 November 1985	15 October 1987^{[‡]}	1 year, 329 days	Zail Singh
14		Justice; Jagdish Sharan Verma (1933- 2013) (Acting)	Madhya Pradesh	16 October 1987	20 February 1988	127 days	Ramaswamy Venkataraman
15		Sukhdev Prasad (1921–1995)	Uttar Pradesh	20 February 1988	2 February 1989	348 days	Ramaswamy Venkataraman
(14)		Justice; Jagdish Sharan Verma (1933- 2013) (Acting)	Madhya Pradesh	3 February 1989	19 February 1989	16 days	Ramaswamy Venkataraman
16		Sukhdev Prasad (1921–1995)	Uttar Pradesh	20 February 1989	2 February 1990^{[‡]}	347 days	Ramaswamy Venkataraman
17		Justice; Milap Chand Jain (1929–2015) (Acting)	Rajasthan	3 February 1990	13 February 1990	10 days	Ramaswamy Venkataraman
18		Professor; Debi Prasad Chattopadhyaya (1933–2022)	West Bengal	14 February 1990	26 August 1991^{[‡]}	1 year, 193 days	Ramaswamy Venkataraman
19		Sarup Singh (1917- 2003) (Additional Charge)	Haryana	26 August 1991	4 February 1992	162 days	Ramaswamy Venkataraman
20		Marri Chenna Reddy (1919–1996)	Andhra Pradesh	5 February 1992	31 May 1993^{[§]} (Note: Transferred as the Governor of Tamil Nadu)	1 year, 115 days	Ramaswamy Venkataraman
21		Dhanik Lal Mandal (1932- 2022) (Additional Charge)	Bihar	31 May 1993	29 June 1993	29 days	Shankar Dayal Sharma
22		Bali Ram Bhagat (1922–2011)	Bihar	30 June 1993	1 May 1998	4 years, 305 days	Shankar Dayal Sharma
23		Darbara Singh (1927–1998)	Punjab	1 May 1998	24 May 1998^{[†]}	23 days	K. R. Narayanan
24		Justice; Navrang Lal Tibrewal (1937- 2024) (Acting)	Rajasthan	25 May 1998	16 January 1999	236 days	K. R. Narayanan
25		Justice (Retd); Anshuman Singh (1935–2021)	Uttar Pradesh	16 January 1999	13 May 2003	4 years, 117 days	K. R. Narayanan
26		Nirmal Chandra Jain (1928–2003)	Madhya Pradesh	14 May 2003	22 September 2003^{[†]}	131 days	A. P. J. Abdul Kalam
27		Kailashpati Mishra (1923- 2012) (Additional Charge)	Bihar	22 September 2003	14 January 2004	114 days	A. P. J. Abdul Kalam
28		Madan Lal Khurana (1936–2018)	Delhi	14 January 2004	1 November 2004^{[‡]}	292 days	A. P. J. Abdul Kalam
29		T. V. Rajeswar; IPS (Retd) (Additional Charge)	Tamil Nadu	1 November 2004	8 November 2004	7 days	A. P. J. Abdul Kalam
30		Pratibha Patil (born 1934)	Maharashtra	8 November 2004	23 June 2007^{[‡]} (Note: Resigned to become the President of India)	2 years, 227 days	A. P. J. Abdul Kalam
31		Akhlaqur Rahman Kidwai (1921- 2016) (Additional Charge)	Delhi	21 June 2007	6 September 2007	77 days	A. P. J. Abdul Kalam
32		Shilendra Kumar Singh; IFS (Retd) (1932–2009)	Delhi	6 September 2007	1 December 2009^{[†]}	2 years, 86 days	Pratibha Patil
33		Prabha Rau (1935- 2010) (Additional charge till 28 January 2010)	Maharashtra	2 December 2009	26 April 2010^{[†]}	145 days	Pratibha Patil
34		Shivraj Patil (1935- 2025) (Additional Charge)	Maharashtra	26 April 2010	12 May 2012	2 years, 16 days	Pratibha Patil
35		Margaret Alva (born 1942)	Karnataka	12 May 2012	7 August 2014	2 years, 87 days	Pratibha Patil
36		Ram Naik (born 1934) (Additional Charge)	Maharashtra	8 August 2014	3 September 2014	26 days	Pranab Mukherjee
37		Kalyan Singh (1932–2021)	Uttar Pradesh	4 September 2014	9 September 2019	5 years, 5 days	Pranab Mukherjee
38		Kalraj Mishra (born 1941)	Uttar Pradesh	9 September 2019	31 July 2024	4 years, 326 days	Ram Nath Kovind
39		Haribhau Bagade (born 1945)	Maharashtra	31 July 2024	Incumbent	2 years, 74 days	Droupadi Murmu

== Timeline ==
Timeline of Rajasthan governors

== Oath ==
“I, A. B., do swear in the name of God/solemly affirm that I will faithfully execute the office of Governor (or discharge the functions of the Governor) of .............(name of the State) and will to the best of my ability preserve, protect and defend the Constitution and the law and that I will devote myself to the service and well-being of the people of ..………(name of the State).”Main, [Name], Ishwar ki shapath leta hoon (ya nishtha se pratigya karta hoon) ki main sachhe mann se Governor (Rajyapal) ke roop mein [State Name] ke pad ka karyabhar sambhalunga (ya zimmedari uthaunga). Main apni poori kabiliyat se Samvidhan (Constitution) aur kanoon (Law) ki raksha, suraksha aur bachaav karunga, aur main apne aap ko [State Name] ki janta ki seva aur kalyan (well-being) mein samarpit karunga."

== See also ==
- Rajasthan
- Government of Rajasthan
- Politics of Rajasthan
- Elections in Rajasthan
- Rajasthan High Court
- Bhajan Lal Sharma ministry
- Rajasthan Legislative Assembly
- List of districts of Rajasthan
- Rajasthan Administrative Service
- List of chief ministers of Rajasthan
- List of deputy chief ministers of Rajasthan
