= Kailashpati Mishra =

Indian politician

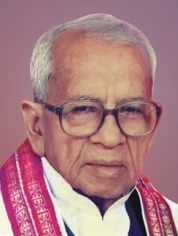
- Mishra on a 2016 stamp of India

15th Governor of Gujarat
- In office 7 May 2003 – 12 July 2004
- Preceded by: Sunder Singh Bhandari
- Succeeded by: Balram Jakhar

Governor of Rajasthan
- (Additional charge)
- In office 22 September 2003 – 14 January 2004
- Preceded by: Nirmal Chandra Jain
- Succeeded by: Madan Lal Khurana

Finance Minister of Bihar
- In office 24 June 1977 – 21 April 1979
- Preceded by: Zawar Hussain
- Succeeded by: Jagannath Mishra

Personal details
- Born: 5 October 1923 Dudharchak, Bihar and Orissa Province, British India
- Died: 3 November 2012 (aged 89) Patna, Bihar, India
- Party: Bharatiya Janata Party
- Spouse: Bachelor
- Education: Mt. Carmel College and Government Law College, Bangalore
- Profession: Lawyer

Kailashpati Mishra (5 October 1923 – 3 November 2012) was an Indian politician. He was a leader of Jana Sangh along with Ramdeo Mahto who was founding leader of BJP in Bihar.

== Early life ==
Kailashpati Mishra was born in Dudharchay in Bihar into a Bhumihar Brahmin family on 5 October 1923. He took part in the Quit India Movement in 1942 and was arrested for the same. He was a member of the Rashtriya Swayamsevak Sangh from 1943, and was even jailed after the assassination of Mahatma Gandhi. While studying in class X, Mr. Mishra was arrested for picketing at the main gate of his school at Buxar in support of 1942 Quit India Movement.

== Political career ==
Kailash Pati Mishra contested 1971 Lok Sabha election on Jana Sangh's ticket from Patna but lost. He won the Bihar Vidhan Sabha election for Bikram seat in 1977, and was appointed finance minister in the Janata Party government of Karpoori Thakur. In 1980, he became the first BJP Bihar president when the party was founded. He also served as BJP national Vice President from 1995 to 2003. He was appointed governor of Gujarat in 2003, and for a short duration he was caretaker Governor of Rajasthan following the death of the incumbent Governor Nirmal Chandra Jain. After the BJP's government's defeat in 2004 polls, Mishra was removed from his post as governor by the Congress Government.

Known as the Bhishma Pitamaha of the Bharatiya Janata Party in Bihar, Mishra was away from direct political activities for the last two years of his life due to old age, but remained a source of inspiration for the party. He was also liked by the socialists due to his participation in JP's 1974 anti-Congress agitations.

Born in 1923 in Bihar's Buxar, Mishra was a lifelong bachelor.

On his death in 2012 at the age of 89, Chief Minister Nitish Kumar, his deputy and senior Bihar BJP leader Sushil Kumar Modi visited his residence to pay condolence. Indian government issued a postal stamp in his honour in 2016.

Preceded by Sunder Singh Bhandari	Governor of Gujarat; May 2003 – July 2004	Succeeded by Balram Jakhar
