= Kishan Swaroop Chaudhari =

Indian judge

Justice Kishan Swaroop Chaudhari

Justice of Rajasthan High Court
- In office 2008–2010

Kishan Swaroop Chaudhari was a former Justice of Rajasthan High Court of India, serving from 2008 to 2010.

Coming from a family of lawyers, both Chaudhari's father and grandfather were also advocates in the Indian legal system. Chaudhari studied at Kishangarh and Ajmer. He was awarded a gold medal for first standing in Law. He served the subordinate courts for a period of 37 years before being elevated as a High Court Judge on 15 April 2008. He retired from High Court on 29 June 2010.

== Publications ==
Chaudhari has published widely and his publications include:

- Stay Orders and Temporary Injunctions
- Punishment to Criminals and Contemnors
- Benefit of Delay to Criminals (awarded Cash prize and Merit Certificate by the State Government of Rajasthan)
- Land Dispute and Criminal Law; and
- Right of Private Defence.
- Amendment in Motor Accident Claims – Laws and Flaws (AIR 1996 Journal 01)
- Limitations of Suits in Curfew (AIR1998 Journal 193)

== Role as special investigator ==
Chaudhari was appointed as chairman of a special team to investigate illegal mining in the State of Rajasthan. He submitted a detailed report before the Rajasthan High Court in May 2012.

== Current role ==
Chaudhari has been appointed as a member of the National Consumer Disputes Redressal Commission, New Delhi for a period of five years. He is the first judge from the State of Rajasthan who has been appointed as a member of the commission.
