= Munishwar Nath Bhandari =

Former Chief Justice of Madras High Court

Hon'ble Chief Justice (Retd.) Munishwar Nath Bhandari

Chief Justice of Madras High Court
- In office September 2022 – Incumbent

Chief Justice of Madras High Court
- In office 14 February 2022 – 12 September 2022
- Nominated by: N. V. Ramana
- Appointed by: Ram Nath Kovind

Acting Chief Justice of Madras High Court
- In office 22 November 2021 – 13 February 2022
- Appointed by: Ram Nath Kovind

Judge of Madras High Court
- In office 22 November 2021 – 13 February 2022
- Nominated by: N. V. Ramana
- Appointed by: Ram Nath Kovind

Acting Chief Justice of Allahabad High Court
- In office 26 June 2021 – 10 October 2021
- Appointed by: Ram Nath Kovind

Judge of Allahabad High Court
- In office 15 March 2019 – 21 November 2021
- Nominated by: Ranjan Gogoi
- Appointed by: Ram Nath Kovind

Judge of Rajasthan High Court
- In office 5 July 2007 – 14 March 2019
- Nominated by: K. G. Balakrishnan
- Appointed by: A. P. J. Abdul Kalam

Personal details
- Born: 13 September 1960 (age 65)

Munishwar Nath Bhandari (born 13 September 1960) is an Indian Judge. He is former Chief Justice of Madras High Court, and the Chairman, Appellate Tribunal under SAFEM Act, 1976. He has also served as Acting Chief Justice of Madras High Court and Allahabad High Court and Judge of Allahabad High Court and Rajasthan High Court.

== Judgeship ==
He was elevated as Judge of Rajasthan High Court on 5 July 2007. He was transferred as Judge of Allahabad High Court on 15 March 2019. He was appointed Acting Chief Justice of Allahabad High Court on 26 June 2021.

On 16 November 2021 he was transferred to Madras High Court and on 22 November 2021 he took charge as Acting Chief Justice of Madras High Court. On 1 February 2022 he was elevated as Chief Justice of the Madras High Court. On 14 February 2022 he took charge as the 51st Chief Justice of the prestigious Madras High Court. Tamilnadu Governor R. N. Ravi administered the oath of office to Justice Bhandari and Tamilnadu Chief Minister M. K. Stalin took part in the swearing-in ceremony at Raj Bhavan, Tamilnadu.

He was retired on 12 September 2022.

== Post-retirement ==
Appointed as Chairman Appellate Tribunal SAFEMA and PMLA on 08/09/2022 by the President of India
