= Nirmal Chandra Jain =

Indian politician and lawyer

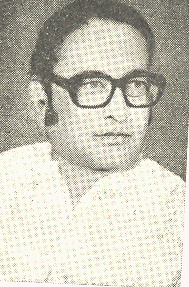

14th Governor of Rajasthan
- In office 14 May 2003 – 22 September 2003
- Preceded by: Anshuman Singh
- Succeeded by: Kailashpati Mishra

Member of Parliament, Lok Sabha
- In office 1977–1980
- Preceded by: Gargi Shankar Mishra
- Succeeded by: Gargi Shankar Mishra
- Constituency: Seoni, Madhya Pradesh

Personal details
- Born: 24 September 1928 Jabalpur, Central Provinces, British India
- Died: 22 September 2003 (aged 74) Jaipur, Rajasthan, India
- Party: Bharatiya Janata Party
- Other political affiliations: Janata Party, Bharatiya Jana Sangh
- Spouse: Rohini Devi
- Children: 4
- Profession: Lawyer, Politician

Nirmal Chandra Jain (24 September 1928 – 22 September 2003) was an Indian lawyer and politician who served as the 14th Governor of Rajasthan in 2003. He was elected to the 6th Lok Sabha from the Seoni constituency in Madhya Pradesh in 1977 as a member of the Janata Party.

== Early life and education ==
Jain was born on 24 September 1928 in Jabalpur, then part of the Central Provinces of British India. He completed his education with degrees in arts and law and began his legal career in 1951 at the Madhya Pradesh High Court in Jabalpur.

== Legal and political career ==
Jain served as Advocate General of Madhya Pradesh and practiced as a senior advocate. He was elected to the Lok Sabha in 1977, representing Seoni in Madhya Pradesh. He also served as a member of the 11th Finance Commission of India from 1998 to 2000.

== Governor of Rajasthan ==
On 14 May 2003, Jain took oath as the Governor of Rajasthan, succeeding Anshuman Singh. He remained in office until his death on 22 September 2003 in Jaipur due to a heart attack.

== Personal life ==
Jain was married to Rohini Devi, and the couple had four children. He was involved in community organizations.
