= Anshuman Singh (politician) =

Indian judge and politician (1935–2021)

Governor of Rajasthan
- In office 16 January 1999 – 14 May 2003
- Preceded by: Navrang Lal Tibrewal
- Succeeded by: Nirmal Chandra Jain

Governor of Gujarat
- In office 25 April 1998 – 16 January 1999
- Preceded by: Krishna Pal Singh
- Succeeded by: K.G. Balakrishnan

Justice of Rajasthan High Court
- In office 28 April 1994 – 6 July 1997

Judge of Allahabad High Court
- In office 1984–1994

Personal details
- Born: 7 July 1935 Allahabad, United Provinces of British India, British Raj
- Died: 8 March 2021 (aged 85) Prayagraj, Uttar Pradesh, India

Anshuman Singh (7 July 1935 – 8 March 2021) was an Indian judge and governor. He served as the Governor of Gujarat from 1998 to 1999 and as the Governor of Rajasthan from 1999 to 2003. Prior to his gubernatorial roles, he was a judge of the Allahabad High Court and later served in the Rajasthan High Court.

== Early life and judicial career ==
Singh was born on 7 July 1935 in Allahabad, in the United Provinces of British India (now Prayagraj, Uttar Pradesh). He completed degrees in arts and law and began his legal career in 1957 as an advocate in the Allahabad District Court.

He was appointed as a judge of the Allahabad High Court in 1984. In 1994, he was transferred to the Rajasthan High Court, where he served until 1997.

== Governorship ==
After retiring as judge, Singh was appointed as the Governor of Gujarat on 25 April 1998 and served in that position until 16 January 1999. He then became the Governor of Rajasthan, a role he held from 16 January 1999 to 14 May 2003.

== Death ==
Anshuman Singh died on 8 March 2021 in Prayagraj due to complications related to COVID-19 during the pandemic in India.
