= Mukul Gopal Mukherjee =

Bengali Indian jurist (1934-2004)

Chief Justice of the Rajasthan High Court

Personal details
- Born: 1934
- Died: 28 February 2004 (aged 69–70)
- Education: Scottish Church College; University of Calcutta

Mukul Gopal Mukherjee (1934 – 28 February 2004) was a Bengali Indian jurist, who served as the Chief Justice of the Rajasthan High Court.

== Early life and career ==
He was educated at the Scottish Church College and the law college at the University of Calcutta. In 1999 and 2000, he had served as the chief justice of the Rajasthan High Court. He had subsequently served as the chairperson of the West Bengal Human Rights Commission. His early education was at Hare School.

== Death ==
Mukherjee died on 28 February 2004.
