= Augustine George Masih =

Judge of the Supreme Court of India

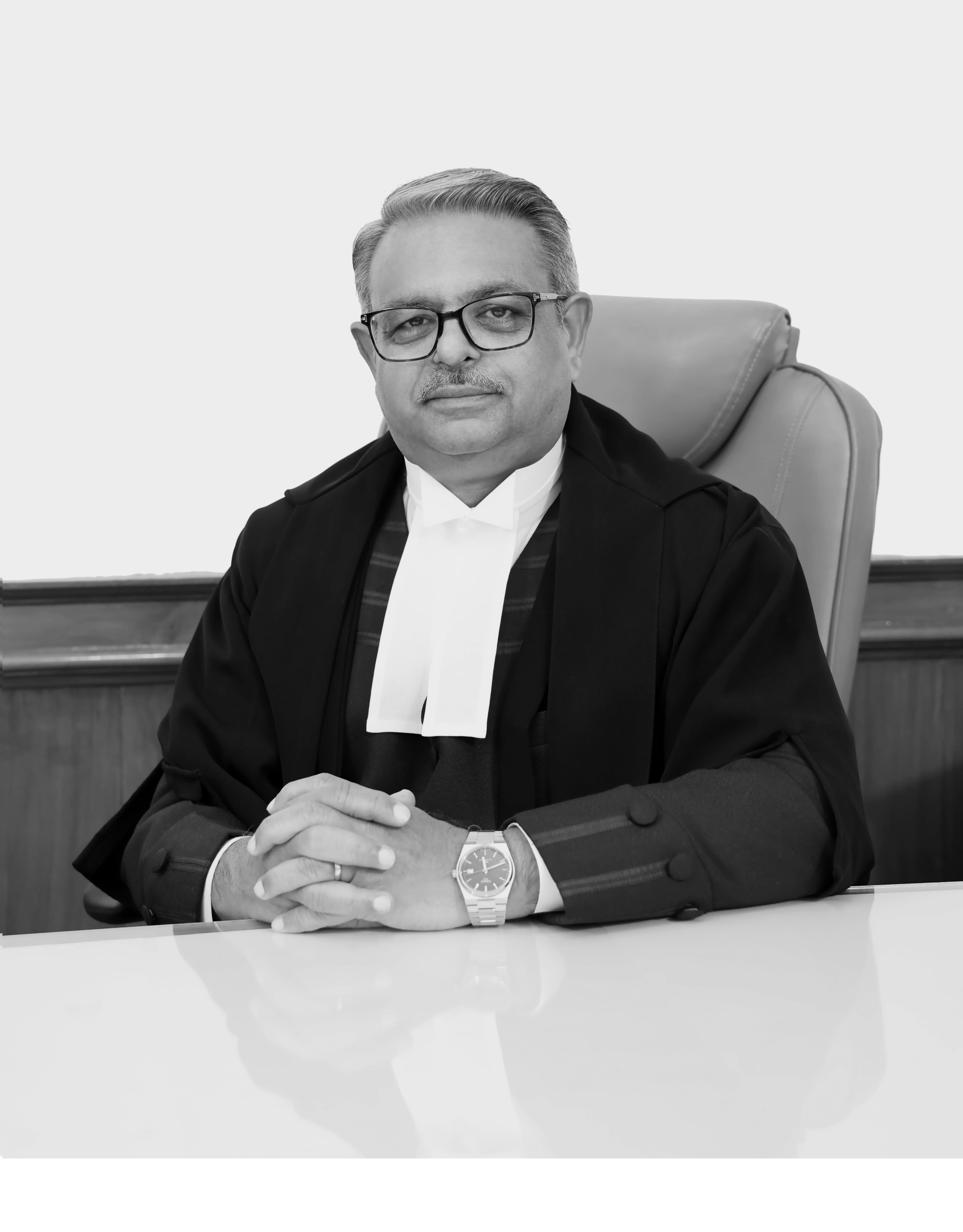

Judge of the Supreme Court of India
- Incumbent
- Assumed office 9 November 2023
- Nominated by: Dhananjaya Y. Chandrachud
- Appointed by: Droupadi Murmu

41st Chief Justice of the Rajasthan High Court
- In office 30 May 2023 – 8 November 2023
- Nominated by: Dhananjaya Y. Chandrachud
- Appointed by: Droupadi Murmu
- Preceded by: Pankaj Mithal
- Succeeded by: Manindra Mohan Shrivastava

Judge of the Punjab and Haryana High Court
- In office 10 July 2008 – 29 May 2023
- Nominated by: K. G. Balakrishnan
- Appointed by: Pratibha Patil

Personal details
- Born: 12 March 1963 (age 63) Ropar, Punjab
- Education: BSc (Hons.) LLB (Hons.)
- Alma mater: Aligarh Muslim University

Augustine George Masih (born 12 March 1963) is a judge of Supreme Court of India. He is a former chief justice of the Rajasthan High Court and a former judge of the Punjab and Haryana High Court.

== Early life and education ==
He was born on 12 March 1963 at Ropar in Punjab. He did his primary education at St. Mary’s Convent School, Kasauli, Himachal Pradesh and then completed school education from high school at Saifuddin Tahir High School, Aligarh, Uttar Pradesh.

He graduated with a degree in Science (Hons.) and then did his LLB (Hons.) from the Aligarh Muslim University at Aligarh.

== Career ==
=== As Advocate ===
He enrolled as an Advocate on the rolls of Bar Council of Punjab & Haryana on 6 June 1987. He practised constitutional law, service law, labour law, and civil law matters on both original and appellate sides. He practised and appeared at several Tribunals, the Punjab and Haryana, Delhi, and Himachal Pradesh High Courts and the Supreme Court.

During his practice at the Punjab and Haryana High Court, he held the posts of Assistant Advocate General, Deputy Advocate General and Additional Advocate General in office of Advocate General, Punjab.

=== As Judge ===
On 10 July 2008, Justice Masih was sworn in as an Additional Judge of the Punjab & Haryana High Court and on 14 January 2014 made a Permanent Judge of the High Court. He held the office until he was elevated as the 41st Chief Justice of the Rajasthan High Court on 30 May 2023.

On 6 November 2023, the Supreme Court collegium recommended Justice Masih as a Judge of the Supreme Court of India. The resolution observed that during his long tenure as a judge of the High Court, Justice Masih had significant experience in diverse fields of law. The resolution also noted that Justice Masih’s appointment will bring diversity and inclusion to the Supreme Court as he belongs to a minority community. He took oath of office as Judge of Supreme Court on 9 November 2023.

He is due to retire from Supreme Court on 11 March 2028.

== See also ==
List of sitting judges of the Supreme Court of India
