= Rajendra Mal Lodha =

41st Chief Justice of India

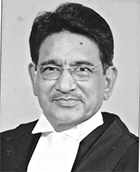

41st Chief Justice of India
- In office 27 April 2014 – 27 September 2014
- Appointed by: Pranab Mukherjee
- Preceded by: P. Sathasivam
- Succeeded by: H. L. Dattu

Judge of the Supreme Court of India
- In office 17 December 2008 – 27 April 2014
- Nominated by: K. G. Balakrishnan
- Appointed by: Pratibha Patil

33rd Chief Justice of the Patna High Court
- In office 13 May 2008 – 16 December 2008
- Nominated by: K. G. Balakrishnan
- Appointed by: Pratibha Patil
- Preceded by: Rajesh Balia
- Succeeded by: J. B. Koshy

Judge of the Rajasthan High Court
- In office 2 February 2007 – 12 May 2008
- Nominated by: Yogesh Kumar Sabharwal
- Appointed by: A. P. J. Abdul Kalam
- In office 31 January 1994 – 15 February 1994
- Nominated by: M N Venkatachaliah
- Appointed by: Shankar Dayal Sharma

Judge of the Bombay High Court
- In office 16 February 1994 – 1 February 2007
- Nominated by: M N Venkatachaliah
- Appointed by: Shankar Dayal Sharma

Personal details
- Born: 28 September 1949 (age 77) Jodhpur, Rajasthan, India
- Relations: Chand Mal Lodha and Guman Mal Lodha (Uncles)
- Education: University of Jodhpur

R. M. Lodha (born 28 September 1949) is a retired Indian judge, who served as the 41st Chief Justice of India from 27 April 2014 to 27 September 2014. Before being elevated to the Supreme Court, he served as the chief justice of Patna High Court. He has also served as a judge in Rajasthan High Court and Bombay High Court. On 14 July 2015, the Supreme Court committee headed by Lodha suspended the owners of Rajasthan Royals and Chennai Super Kings from the Indian Premier League cricket tournament for a period of two years for alleged involvement in betting.

== Early life ==
Rajendra Mal Lodha was born in an Oswal Jain family to Justice S K Mal Lodha, a former judge of Rajasthan High Court. He was born in Jodhpur, Rajasthan. He completed his BSc and LLB at the Jodhpur University.

== Career ==
In February 1973, he enrolled with the Bar Council of Rajasthan at Jodhpur. He moved to Jaipur in 1977 on formation of Jaipur Bench of the Rajasthan High Court. He was appointed Central Government standing counsel at the Rajasthan High Court in 1990. On 31 January 1994, Lodha was elevated as a permanent judge of Rajasthan High Court at Jodhpur. On 16 February 1994, he was transferred to Bombay High Court and served till 2007. He resumed office as a judge of Rajasthan High Court on 2 February 2007. On 13 May 2008, he was elevated as the Chief Justice of the Patna High Court.

Lodha was appointed the Chief Justice of India succeeding P Sathasivam on 11 April and assumed charge on 27 April 2014. Justice Lodha said that infusing greater transparency in the appointment of judges and initiating steps to reduce the backlog of 33,000,000 pending cases would be among his priorities.

Over the course of his Supreme Court tenure, Lodha authored 273 judgments.

His father Srikrishna Mal Lodha was former judge of Rajasthan High Court and uncles Chand Mal Lodha and Guman Mal Lodha were chief justices of different high courts.

== Other positions held ==
These include:

- Chairman, State Judicial Academy, Rajasthan
- Executive Chairman, National Legal Services Authority
- Chairman, General Council, Gujarat National Law University, Gandhinagar
- President, Supreme Court Middle Income Group Legal Aid Society
- Chairperson, Advisory Committee, National Court Management Systems
- Chancellor, National Law School of India University, Bengaluru
- Chancellor, West Bengal National University of Juridical Sciences, Kolkata
- Chancellor, Chanakya National Law University, Patna

Legal offices
Preceded by P. Sathasivam	Chief Justice of India; 27 April 2014 – 27 September 2014	Succeeded by H. L. Dattu
