= Vedpal Tyagi =

Indian judge and politician (1915-1979)

Ved Pal Tyagi

10th Chief Justice of Rajasthan High Court
- In office 6 November 1975 – 27 December 1977
- Appointed by: Fakhruddin Ali Ahmed
- Preceded by: Prakash Narayan Shinghal
- Succeeded by: C. Honniah; A. P. Sen (acting); Mohan Lal Joshi (acting)

Judge of Rajasthan High Court
- In office 13 September 1962 – 5 November 1975
- Nominated by: B. P. Sinha
- Appointed by: S. Radhakrishnan

Member of Rajasthan Legislative Assembly
- In office 1952–1957
- Preceded by: Constituency established
- Succeeded by: Dhanna Lal Harit
- Constituency: Chhabra

Cabinet Minister in Greater Rajasthan
- In office 7 April 1949 – 5 January 1951
- Appointed by: Sawai Man Singh (Rajpramukh)
- Chief Minister: Heera Lal Shastri

Personal details
- Born: 18 December 1915 Mangrol, Rajasthan
- Died: 30 October 1979 (aged 63) Rajasthan, India
- Education: Hindu College, Delhi (B.Sc); Allahabad University (LL.B)
- Occupation: Chief Justice, Rajasthan High Court; Politician

Vedpal Tyagi (28 December 1915 – 30 October 1979), alternatively Ved Pal Tyagi, was an Indian judge who served as the 10th Chief Justice of Rajasthan High Court from 1975 to 1977.

== Early life and career ==
Tyagi was born to Maharaj Singh on 28 December 1915 at Mangrol, Rajasthan. He completed his B.Sc from Hindu College, Delhi and LL.B from University of Allahabad. He started practice at Kota from 7 February 1978. He became the cabinet minister in the government of Greater Rajasthan on 7 April 1949 under chief ministership of Hiralal Shastri holding two portfolios of law and rehabilitation. He later became leader of opposition also. He also became the member of first Rajasthan Legislative Assembly following 1952 Rajasthan Legislative Assembly election.

On 13 September 1962 he was appointed as the Judge of Rajasthan High Court and elevated as Chief Justice of the same on 6 November 1975. He became the acting Governor of Rajasthan, serving from 15 February 1977 to 11 May 1977. He was appointed to the role, following the resignation of Jogendra Singh. He retired from Rajasthan High Court on 27 December 1977 and after retirement he was appointed the Vice chancellor of Rajasthan university. Tyagi died on 30 October 1979, at the age of 63.
