= Guman Mal Lodha =

Indian politician and jurist

Member of Parliament, Lok Sabha
- In office 1989 - 1991
- Speaker: Rabi Ray
- Preceded by: Shankar Lal
- Succeeded by: Himself
- Constituency: Pali
- In office 1991 - 1996
- Speaker: Shivraj Patil
- Preceded by: Himself
- Succeeded by: Himself
- Constituency: Pali
- In office 1996 - 1998
- Speaker: P. A. Sangma
- Preceded by: Himself
- Succeeded by: Mitha Lal Jain
- Constituency: Pali

19th Chief Justice of Gauhati High Court
- In office 1 March 1988 - 15 March 1988
- Nominated by: R. S. Pathak
- Appointed by: R. Venkataraman
- Preceded by: K. N. Saika
- Succeeded by: Anisetti Raghuvir

Judge of Rajasthan High Court
- In office 1 May 1978 - 28 February 1988
- Nominated by: Y. V. Chandrachud
- Appointed by: Neelam Sanjiva Reddy

Member of the Rajasthan Legislative Assembly
- In office 1972 - 1977
- Speaker: Ram Kishore Vyas
- Preceded by: Barkatullah Khan
- Succeeded by: Birad Mal Singhvi
- Constituency: Jodhpur

President of Jana Sangh, Rajasthan
- In office 1969 - 1971

Personal details
- Born: 16 March 1926 Didwana, Nagaur Rajasthan
- Died: 22 March 2009 (aged 83) Ahmedabad, Gujarat
- Party: Bhartiya Janta Party
- Other political affiliations: Jan Sangh
- Relations: Chand Mal Lodha (Brother); Rajendra Mal Lodha (Nephew)
- Children: Mangal Lodha
- Education: B. Com, LL. B.
- Alma mater: Jawant College, Jodhpur
- Occupation: Politician, Lawyer and Judge

Guman Mal Lodha (16 March 1926 – 22 March 2009) was a retired Indian judge, a former chief justice of Gauhati High Court and former member of Lok Sabha.

== Early life and career ==
He was Born in a Marwari Jain family in 1926 in Didwana, Nagaur District in Rajasthan, India, Lodha graduated with BCom and LLB degrees at Jaswant College, Jodhpur. He participated in the freedom movement and was imprisoned in 1942. He joined politics and was the President of Rajasthan state unit of Jan Sangh from 1969 to 1971.

His son Mangal Lodha is also politician and currently minister in Government of Maharashtra and founder of Macrotech Developers. His grandsons are engaged in legal battle over Lodha trademark and the matter is pending before Supreme Court of India.

== See also ==
- 1972 Rajasthan Legislative Assembly election
- List of members of the 9th Lok Sabha
- List of members of the 10th Lok Sabha
- List of members of the 11th Lok Sabha
