= Rajasthan State Human Rights Commission =

State Government body

Rajasthan State Human Rights Commission राजस्थान राज्य मानवाधिकार आयोग

Agency overview
- Formed: 18 January 1999
- Preceding agency: National Human Rights Commission of India

Jurisdictional structure
- Federal agency: India
- Operations jurisdiction: India
- Area: 342,239 km^{2}
- Population: 73,529,325 (2015)
- Constituting instrument: TPHRA, 1993
- General nature: Federal law enforcement

Operational structure
- Headquarters: Jaipur, Rajasthan
- Agency executive: Ganga Ram Moolchandani

Website
- www.rshrc.rajasthan.gov.in

The Rajasthan State Human Rights Commission is a State Government body constituted on 18 January 1999 to exercise the powers conferred upon and functions assigned to a State Human Rights Commission under chapter-V of The Protection of Human Rights Act, 1993.

The commission became functional from 23 March 2000 with the appointment of Justice Kanta Kumari Bhatnagar, former Chief Justice of the Madras High Court as the first Chairperson along with Shri R. K. Akodia, Shri B. L. Joshi and Prof. Alamshah Khan as the supporting members.

== Functions ==
The Commission shall perform all or any of the following functions in accordance to chapter-III point No.12 of the TPHRA-1993.

1. Inquire, moto or on a petition presented to it by a victim or any person on his behalf or on a direction or order of any court into complaint of
  1. Violation of human rights or abatement thereof; or
  2. Negligence in the prevention of such violation, by a public servant;
2. Intervene in any proceeding involving any allegation of violation of human rights pending before a court with the approval of such court;
3. Visit, notwithstanding anything contained in any other law for the time being in force, any jail or other institution under the control of the State Government, where persons are detained or lodged for purposes of treatment, reformation or protection, for the study of the living conditions of the inmates thereof and make recommendations thereon to the Government;
4. Review the safeguards provided by or under the Constitution or any law for the time being in force for the protection of human rights and recommend measures for their effective implementation;
5. Review the factors, including acts of terrorism that inhibit the enjoyment of human rights and recommend appropriate remedial measures;
6. Study treaties and other international instruments on human rights and make recommendations for their effective implementation;
7. Undertake and promote research in the field of human rights;
8. Spread human rights literacy among various sections of society and promote awareness of the safeguards available for the protection of these rights through publications, the media, seminars and other available means;
9. Encourage the efforts of non-governmental organisations and institutions working in the field of human rights;
10. Such other functions as it may consider necessary for the protection of human rights.

== Procedure ==
The course of action to any case as mentioned in chapter-IV point no. 17 to 20 of TPHRA Act 1993.

=== Inquiry into complaints ===
The Commission while inquiring into the complaints of violations of human rights may–

1. call for information or report from the Central Government or any State Government or any other authority or organisation subordinate thereto within such time as may be specified by it:- Provided that–
  1. if the information or report is not received within the time stipulated by the Commission, it may proceed to inquire into the complaint on its own;
  2. if, on receipt of information or report, the Commission is satisfied either that no further inquiry is required or that the required action has been initiated or taken by the concerned Government or authority, it may not proceed with the complaint and inform the complainant accordingly;
  3. without prejudice to anything contained in clause (i), if it considers necessary, having regard to the nature of the complaint, initiate an inquiry.

=== Steps during and after inquiry ===
The Commission may take any of the following steps during or upon the completion of an inquiry held under this Act, namely:-

1. where the inquiry discloses the commission of violation of human rights or negligence in the prevention of violation of human rights or abatement thereof by a public servant, it may recommend to the concerned Government or authority –
  1. to make payment of compensation or damages to the complainant or to the victim or the members of his family as the Commission may consider necessary;
  2. to initiate proceedings for prosecution or such other suitable action as the Commission may deem fit against the concerned person or persons;
  3. to take such further action as it may think fit;
2. approach the Supreme Court or the High Court concerned for such directions, orders or writs as that Court may deem necessary;
3. recommend to the concerned Government or authority at any stage of the inquiry the grant of such immediate interim relief to the victim or the members of his family as the Commission may consider necessary;
4. subject to the provisions of clause
5. provide a copy of the inquiry report to the petitioner or his representative;
6. the Commission shall send a copy of its inquiry report together with its recommendations to the concerned Government or authority and the concerned Government or authority shall, within a period of one month, or such further time as the Commission may allow, forward its comments on the report, including the action taken or proposed to be taken thereon, to the Commission;
7. the Commission shall publish its inquiry report together with the comments of the concerned Government or authority, if any, and the action taken or proposed to be taken by the concerned Government or authority on the recommendations of the Commission.

=== Procedure with respect to armed forces ===
1. Notwithstanding anything contained in this Act, while dealing with complaints of violation of human rights by members of the armed forces, the Commission shall adopt the following procedure, namely :-
  1. It may, either on its own motion or on receipt of a petition, seek a report from the Central Government
  2. After the receipt of the report, it may, either not proceed with the complaint or, as the case may be, make its recommendations to that Government.
2. The Central Government shall inform the Commission of the action taken on the recommendations within three months or such further time as the Commission may allow.
3. The Commission shall publish its report together with its recommendations made to the Central Government and the action taken by that Government on such recommendations.
4. The Commission shall provide a copy of the report published under sub-section (3) to the petitioner or his representative.

=== Annual and special reports of the Commission ===
1. The Commission shall submit an annual report to the Central Government and to the State Government concerned and may at any time submit special reports on any matter which, in its opinion, is of such urgency or importance that it should not be deferred till submission of the annual report.
2. The Central Government and the State Government, as the case may be, shall cause the annual and special reports of the Commission to be laid before each House of Parliament or the State Legislature respectively, as the case may be, along with a memorandum of action taken or proposed to be taken on the recommendations of the Commission and the reasons for non-acceptance of the recommendations, if any.

== Composition ==
After an official comment from Supreme court Justice Prakash Chandra Tatia, former Chief Justice of Jharkhand High Court was appointed as the Chairperson, his name was recommended along with Shri Chandramohan Meena as Member and Shri Ashutosh Sharma as an expert, by two selection committees headed by Chief Minister Vasundhara Raje Scindia.

=== Present team ===
Name	Designation	From
Justice Gangaram Moolchandani	Chairperson	--
Shri Mahesh Goyal	Member	--
Shri Ashutosh Sharma	Member	--
Shri H. R. Kuri	Member	1 September 2011
Dr. M. K. Devarajan	Member	1 September 2011
Shri Janga Srinivas Rao	Secretary	5 April 2010
Smt. Sanchita Bishnoi	Deputy Secretary	30 March 2012
Shri P. R. Pandit	Secretary	3 March 2014
Shri Saurabh Srivastava	Director General Police	3 March 2014

Earlier Shri H. R. Kuri was heading the commission as an Acting Chairman since the position become vacant after the former Chief Justice Nagendra Kumar Jain from Madras and Karnataka High Court, completed his tenure as the Chairperson from 16 July 2005 till 15 July 2010.

=== Former Chairmen & Members ===
Name	Designation	From	Till
Justice Kanta Kumari Bhatnagar	Chairperson	23 March 2000	11 August 2000
Justice Saiyed Saghir Ahmad	Chairperson	16 February 2001	3 June 2004
Justice Nagendra Kumar Jain	Chairperson	16 July 2005	15 July 2010
Justice Amar Singh Godara	Member	7 July 2000	6 July 2005
Shri R. K. Akodia	Member	25 March 2000	24 March 2005
Shri B. L. Joshi	Member	25 March 2000	31 March 2004
Prof. Alamshah Khan	Member	24 March 2000	16 May 2003
Shri Namo Narayan Meena	Member	11 September 2003	23 March 2004
Shri Dharam Singh Meena	Member	7 July 2005	6 July 2010
Justice Jagat Singh	Member	10 October 2005	9 October 2010
Shri Pukhraj Sirvi	Member	15 April 2004	13 April 2011

== Reports ==
The commission had assessed a sum of 17,033 incidents between 2010~2014 with the highest number of incidents reported from Jaipur followed by Ajmer out of 33 districts. A comprehensive district and incident wise, report is annually published by the commission reflecting status of the incidents along with some of the important and major rulings by the commission each year.

From	Till	Child	Health	Prison	Gang	Labor	SC / ST	Police	Pollution	Religious	Woman	Others	Rejected	Total
1 April 2004	31 March 2005	13	43	94	19	01	19	819	16	29	92	125	2002	3272
1 April 2005	31 March 2006	18	50	84	48	08	41	867	12	48	130	112	2317	3735
1 April 2006	31 March 2007	20	30	80	38	12	16	1002	16	54	158	158	2306	3890
1 April 2007	31 March 2008	24	38	63	08	08	27	997	17	33	186	317	2126	3844
1 April 2008	31 March 2009	36	34	57	26	06	39	1121	14	27	191	331	2095	3977
1 April 2009	31 March 2010	18	05	98	161	03	96	768	08	19	142	407	1526	3251
1 April 2010	31 March 2011	35	22	126	211	08	48	842	14	34	172	285	1777	3574
1 April 2011	31 March 2012	29	45	114	117	10	35	1175	20	36	181	288	1871	3921
1 April 2012	31 March 2013	29	117	112	55	07	20	1371	21	37	101	905	2177	4952
1 April 2013	31 March 2014	17	68	91	17	06	02	1375	03	31	32	1052	1892	4586

== Significant incidents ==
Some of the recent incidents which brought Human Rights concerns in the state of Rajasthan under News are:

- Pakistani resident Hawa Devi, who is stuck in Jodhpur for over a year, waiting for permission of departure.
- Notice to the state police and local authorities seeking a detailed report of the car accident involving BJP, MP Hema Malini, which killed a four-year-old girl.
- Suo-motu cognizance of the rising suicides by students in the coaching hub of Kota.
- Police's attitude in handling a minor gang rape incident in Sikar.
- Right to die practicing Sallekhana as per Jainism.
- RAC’s 11th battalion IPS officer accused of corruption and favoritism.
- NHRC's Suo-motu cognizance in case where Cops strip woman in Ajmer police station to recover stolen mobile.
- Fake pharmaceutical company in Rajasthan had recently supplied various life saving medicines & antibiotics to 13 different states.
- Beawar sex racket investigation.
- Rising number of cancer patients due to radiation after Pokhran-II nuke test from Khetolai and Loharki villages.
- Recommendations to make necessary amendments in Mines Act, 1952 to contain the alarming spread of occupational diseases like silicosis and effectively deal with violators.
- Fair compensation for land acquired by govt. is farmer’s human right:Supreme court of India.
- The Rajasthan Human Rights Commission, advocated to make home guards permanent working in Jaisalmer and Barmer.
