= Kanta Kumari Bhatnagar =

- Born: 1929 or 1930
- Died: 13 August 2011 (age 81); Udaipur, Rajasthan, India
- Known for: High court judge chairperson of the Rajasthan State Human Rights Commission

Kanta Kumari Bhatnagar (Hindi: कान्ता भटनागर c. 1930 – 13 August 2011) was a judge and human rights activist in India. Bhatnagar was the first woman to become a Chief Justice of the Madras High Court and was the first chairperson of the Rajasthan State Human Rights Commission.

== Biography ==
Bhatnagar worked as a judge in Rajasthan in 1968. She became the Chief Justice of the Madras High Court in June 1992, becoming the first woman to serve as chief justice of that court, and held that post for around five months.

Bhatnagar became the first chair of the Rajasthan State Human Rights Commission in 2000.

She died at age 81 of a heart attack in Udaipur on 13 August 2011.
