= Y. R. Meena =

Indian judge (1946–2023)

Hon'ble Chief Justice (Retd.) Y.R Meena

Chief Justice of Gujarat High Court
- In office 3 February 2007 – 30 June 2008
- Appointed by: A.P.J Abdul Kalam

Justice of Gujarat High Court
- In office 3 April 2006 – 2 February 2007
- Appointed by: A.P.J Abdul Kalam

Acting Patron-in-Chief of Rajasthan State Judicial Academy
- In office 22 October 2004 – 11 October 2005
- Appointed by: A. P. J. Abdul Kalam

Justice of Rajasthan High Court
- In office 5 November 2001 – 3 April 2006
- Appointed by: K.R Narayanan

Justice of Calcutta High Court
- In office December 1997 – 4 November 2001
- Appointed by: K.R Narayanan

Additional Justice of Rajasthan High Court
- In office 20 July 1990 – December 1997
- Nominated by: Ranganath Mishra

Personal details
- Born: 1 July 1946
- Died: 21 March 2023 (aged 76)

Y. R. Meena or Yad Ram Meena (1 July 1946 — 21 March 2023) was an Indian judge and the former Chief Justice of the Gujarat High Court.

== Early life ==
Born on 1 July 1946 in Alwar, he completed his B.A. Degree from B R College Alwar. Then completed his LL.B. degree from University of Rajasthan, Jaipur.

== Career ==
Justice Y.R. Meena, son of Ramkripal Meena was born in 1946. He passed B.A. LL.B. and enrolled as an advocate in 1968. He practised in Civil, Criminal and Revenue Matters, appointed a Law Officer of the Law Commission of India in 1973. Justice Meena was appointed Deputy Legislative Counsel and Additional Legislative Counsel in Ministry of Law and Justice, Delhi in 1976 and 1979 respectively. In 1980 he became a Member of Income Tax Appellate Tribunal. On 20 July 1990 he was appointed an additional Judge of Rajasthan High Court and transferred to Calcutta High Court in December 1997. In 2001 Meena was transferred to the Rajasthan High Court and took charge of the Acting Chief Justice since 2004. He was a Patron in Chief of Rajasthan State Judicial academy. He was elevated in the post of the Chief Justice of High Court of Gujarat on 3 February 2007. Justice Meena retired on 30 June 2008 from the post. After the retirement he joined in the BJP in October 2008. He died on 21 March 2023.
