= Raju Guldai =

Indian footballer

Personal information
- Full name: Raju Guldai
- Date of birth: 12 December 1998 (age 27)
- Place of birth: Mumbai, Maharashtra, India
- Position: Forward

Team information
- Current team: Out of contract
- Number: 41

Youth career
- 2010–2013: Mumbai City
- 2013–2015: Misr Lel-Makkasa SC
- 2015–2016: Mumbai City

Senior career*
Years	Team	Apps	(Gls)
2016–2017	Mumbai City	0(1)	(0)

International career
- India U19
- * Club domestic league appearances and goals as of 21 October 2016

Raju Guldai (born 12 December 1998) is an Indian professional footballer. He played as a forward for Mumbai City in the Indian Super League.

== Career ==
=== Egypt ===
Born in Mumbai, Maharashrtra, Guldai was scouted by Egyptian club Misr Lel-Makkasa SC Football Academy in 2013 during a talent search, while playing for Mumbay City in a tournament in Japan. He moved to Egypt with his father and played for the Faiyum club for 2 years, before returning to Mumbai due to his father's foreign registration issues in the middle east.

=== Mumbai City ===
In 2015, Guldai took part in the "Kick for tolerance" tournament, organized by Jungle Crow foundation. In 2016, Guldai was selected to join the Mumbai City first team, and on December 3, 2016, he made his first and only appearance, as a substitute in the 0–0 draw vs Delhi Dynamos. At the end of the 2016 season, Guldai was released from the club.

== International ==
During 2016, Guldai was part of India's U19 squad.
