= Rajesh Balia =

Indian Judge

Rajesh Balia (born 3 March 1946) is a retired Indian judge and a former Chief Justice of the Patna High Court.

== Early life and education ==
Balia was born in 1946 in a business family. His father, the Late Manak Lal Sa Balia, was a businessman and influenced by the Gandhian Movement. Balia passed B.Com. and LL.B. and started practice on 9 April 1967 in the Rajasthan High Court.

== Career ==
He was appointed an additional judge of the Rajasthan High Court on 21 October 1991 and confirmed as a permanent judge of the same High Court in 1992. He was transferred to Gujarat High Court and then named the Acting Chief Justice of Rajasthan High Court from 12 November 2007 to 4 January 2008. Justice Balia was elevated as the Chief Justice of Patna High Court on 5 January 2008 and retired on 3 March 2008. After his retirement, he was appointed Chairman of Rajasthan State Human Rights Commission on 31 August 2011.
