= A P Ravani =

Indian judge

Amratlal Paramananddas Ravani, a former Chief Justice of Rajasthan High Court, was born in 1934. He enrolled as an advocate with the Bar Council of Gujarat in 1962.

Ravani was appointed an Additional Judge of Gujarat High Court in 1982 and became a Permanent Judge the same year. He was transferred to Rajasthan High Court in 1995 and was appointed the Chief Justice of that court the same year. He resigned in 1996.

Ravani was a vocal critic of BJP's communalism in the wake of the 2002 Gujarat riots. He submitted a written testimony to the National Human Rights Commission after the riots.
