= Swapnali Yadav =

Indian swimmer

Personal information
- Born: 5 December 1998 (age 27) Andheri, India

Sport
- Sport: Swimming

Swapnali Yadav (born 5 December 1998) is a 23-year-old Andheri woman. She is the youngest competitor and the first from India to win the women's category in the Kimberley National Lake Argyle Swim in Kununurra, Western Australia. Popularly known as India 'Little Mermaid' in the world of swimming., she won the first Kimberley National Lake Argyle Swim that was held on 30 April 2011 in Australia's second-biggest artificial lake.

Swapnali was a special invitee for the 20 km Open swim in the 80 km picturesque lake, which is infested by about 35,000 crocodiles. She took 7 hours, 7 minutes and 24 seconds to finish overall second.

== Record ==
This feat also earned her a place in the Limca Book of Records. She is being trained by Raju Palkar.

She has also won the 10-mile course for female youth (under-18) at the prestigious Kingdom Aqua fest that was held on the shores of Lake Memphremagog, in the heart of Northeast Kingdom, Newport, Vermont, US on Saturday, 24 July.

She added the Kingdom Aqua fest effort to the outstanding performances as the youngest-ever in the world in the 2007 Open World Swimming Marathon and the 30 km Messinikos Gulf Swim in 2008–09, both in Greece, and the 2009 Bermuda Round the Sound Open Swimathon, to announce her arrival in international swimming.

In 2012, Swapnali won the silver medal in the Junior International Triathlon held in Malaysia.
