= Rajasthan High Court =

High Court for the State of Rajasthan

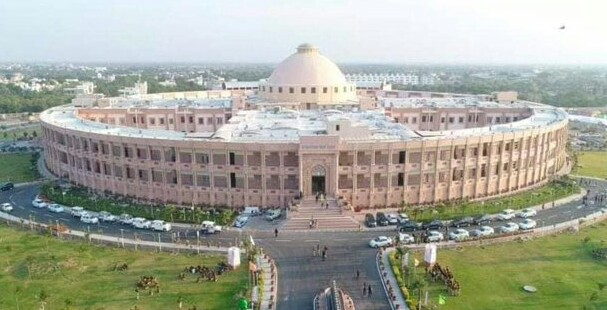
- Rajasthan High Court Building

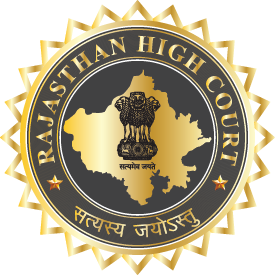
- Interactive map of Rajasthan High Court
- 26.125436°N 73.025494°E
- Established: 29 August 1949; 77 years ago
- Jurisdiction: Rajasthan
- Location: Principal Seat: Jodhpur, Rajasthan; Circuit Bench: Jaipur
- Coordinates: 26.125436°N 73.025494°E
- Composition method: Presidential appointment with confirmation of Chief Justice of India and Governor of respective state.
- Authorised by: Constitution of India
- Appeals to: Supreme Court of India
- Judge term length: Mandatory retirement by age of 62
- Number of positions: 50 (Permanent: 38; Addl: 12)
- Website: hcraj.nic.in/%20http://hcraj.nic.in/

Chief Justice
- Currently: Sanjay K. Agrawal
- Since: 7 September 2026

The High Court of Rajasthan is located in Jodhpur and is the highest court in the state of Rajasthan. It was established on 29 August 1949 under the Rajasthan High Court Ordinance, 1949. Currently, the sanctioned strength of the judges is 50 and the actual strength varies as per recent appointments.

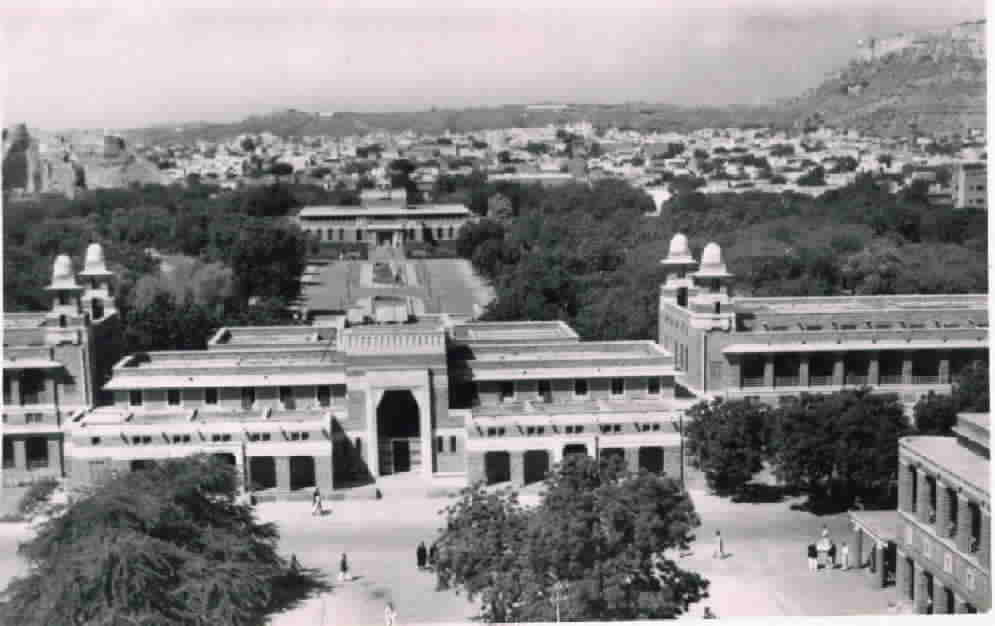
View of the Rajasthan High Court, Sardar museum in Umaid Park and upper right is Jodhpur fort in 1960.

There were five High Courts operated across different regions—at Jodhpur, Jaipur, Bikaner, and in the former Rajasthan and Matsya Union. The Rajasthan High Court Ordinance, 1949 brought these institutions together, establishing a single High Court to serve the entire state under a unified judicial system. The High Court of Rajasthan was founded in 1949 at Jaipur and was inaugurated by the Rajpramukh, Maharaja Sawai Man Singh on 29 August 1949, later on after complete integration of Rajasthan in 1956 it was moved at Jodhpur with recommendation of the Satyanarayan Rao committee.

The first Chief Justice was Kamalkanta Verma. A bench was formed at Jaipur on 31 January 1977 under Section 51(2) of the States Reorganisation Act, 1956 which was dissolved in 1958.

The high court was shifted to a new premises on outskirts of Jodhpur from the city centre in 2019. The president of India inaugurated the newly constructed building.

This is the 'list of chief justices of the Rajasthan High Court' from its establishment in 1947.

Chief Justice of Rajasthan High Court
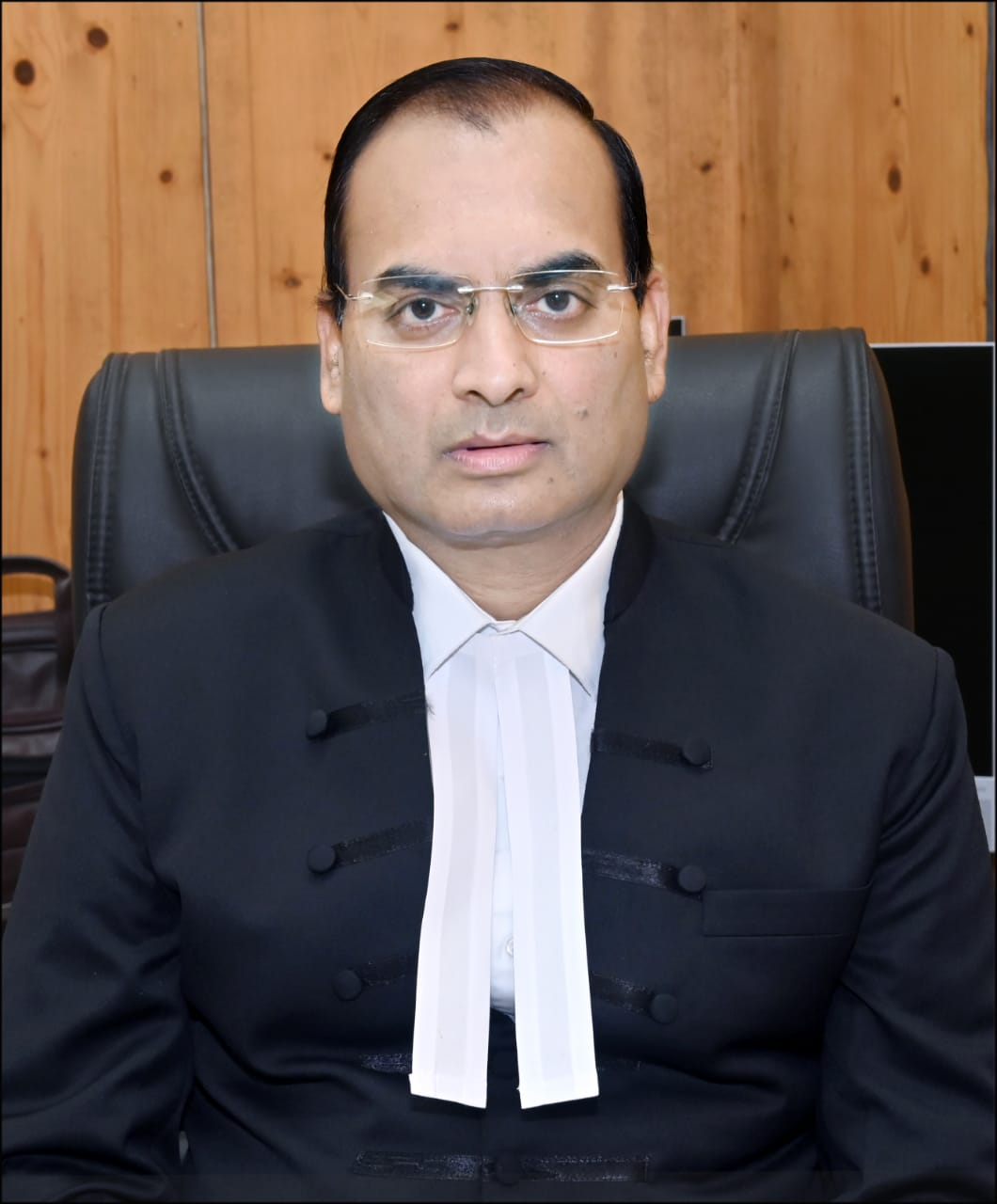
- Incumbent; Sanjay K. Agrawal
- Abbreviation: CJ Rajasthan
- Seat: Jodhpur
- Nominator: Collegium of the Supreme Court
- Appointer: President of India
- Term length: till the age of 62 yrs
- Constituting instrument: Constitution of India (under Article 124)
- Formation: 21 June 1947; 79 years ago
- First holder: Justice Sarat Kumar Ghosh (1947)
- Salary: ₹250,000 (US$2,700) (per month)
- Website: http://www.hcraj.nic.in/

== Chief Justice and Judges ==
=== Former Chief Justices ===
#	Portrait	Chief Justice	From	To
1		Kamalkanta Verma	29 August 1949	24 January 1950
2	K. N. Wanchoo	Kailas Nath Wanchoo	2 January 1951	10 August 1958
3		Sarjoo Prasad	28 February 1959	10 October 1961
4		Jawan Singh Ranawat	11 October 1961	31 May 1963
5		Durga Shakti Dave	1 June 1963	17 December 1968
6		Daulat Mal Bhandari	18 December 1968	15 December 1969
7		Jagat Narayan	16 December 1969	13 February 1973
8		Bhagwati Prasad Beri	14 February 1973	16 February 1975
9		Prakash Narayan Shinghal	17 February 1975	5 November 1975
10		Vedpal Tyagi	6 November 1975	27 December 1977
11		Closepet Honniah	27 April 1978	22 September 1978
12		Chand Mal Lodha	12 March 1979	9 July 1980
13		Kalyan Dutt Sharma	7 January 1981	22 October 1983
14		Pradyot Kumar Banerjee	23 October 1983	30 September 1985
15		Dwarka Prasad Gupta	12 April 1986	31 July 1986
16	J. S. Verma	Jagdish Sharan Verma	1 September 1986	22 May 1989
17		Krishna Chandra Agarwal	15 April 1990	7 April 1994
18		Gokal Chand Mittal	12 April 1994	3 March 1995
19		Amratlal Parmananddas Ravani	4 April 1995	10 September 1996
20		Mukul Gopal Mukherjee	19 September 1996	24 December 1997
21		Shivaraj Virupanna Patil	22 January 1999	14 March 2000
22		Arunachalam R. Lakshmanan	29 May 2000	25 November 2001
23		Arun Kumar	2 December 2001	2 October 2002
24		Anil Dev Singh	24 December 2002	22 October 2004
25		Sachchidanand Jha	12 October 2005	15 June 2007
26		Jagdish Madhurlal Panchal	16 September 2007	11 November 2007
27		Narayan Roy	5 January 2008	31 January 2009
28		Deepak Verma	6 March 2009	10 May 2009
29		Jagadish Bhalla	10 August 2009	31 October 2010
30		Arun Kumar Mishra	26 November 2010	13 December 2012
31		Amitava Roy	2 January 2013	5 August 2014
32		Sunil Ambwani	24 March 2015	22 August 2015
33		Satish Kumar Mittal	5 March 2016	14 April 2016
34		Navin Sinha	14 May 2016	16 February 2017
35		Pradeep Nandrajog	2 April 2017	6 April 2019
36		Shripathi Ravindra Bhat	5 May 2019	23 September 2019
37		Indrajit Mahanty	6 October 2019	11 October 2021
38		Akil Abdulhamid Kureshi	12 October 2021	6 March 2022
39		Sambhaji Shiwaji Shinde	21 June 2022	1 August 2022
40		Pankaj Mithal	14 October 2022	5 February 2023
41		Augustine George Masih	30 May 2023	8 November 2023
42		Manindra Mohan Shrivastava	6 February 2024	20 July 2025
43		Kalpathi Rajendran Shriram	21 July 2025	27 September 2025

== Judges elevated as Chief Justices ==
This sections contains list of only those judges elevated as chief justices whose parent high court is Rajasthan. This includes those judges who, at the time of appointment as chief justice, may not be serving in Rajasthan High Court but this list does not include judges who at the time of appointment as chief justice were serving in Rajasthan High Court but does not have Rajasthan as their Parent High Court.

Colour Key

- Female Chief Justice
- Served as Chief Justice of India

Symbol Key

- ^{‡} Elevated to Supreme Court of India
- ^{RES} Resigned
- ^{†} Died in office

Name	Image	Appointed as CJ in HC of	Date of appointment		Date of retirement (Note: this includes date of resignation, death and elevation to supreme court)	Tenure	
Name	Image	Appointed as CJ in HC of	As Judge	As Chief Justice	Date of retirement	As Chief Justice	As Judge (Note: also includes tenure as Chief Justice)
Jawan Singh Ranawat		Rajasthan	29 August 1949	11 October 1961	31 May 1963	1 year, 233 days	13 years, 276 days
Durga Shakti Dave		Rajasthan	29 August 1949 (Note: Appointed as judge on 29 August 1949 and served till 25 January 1951. Reappointed as permanent judge on 12 July 1952 and served till his retirement as chief justice on 17 December 1968)	1 June 1963	17 December 1968	5 years, 200 days	17 years, 309 days
Daulat Mal Bhandari		Rajasthan	26 July 1955	18 December 1968	15 December 1969	363 days	14 years, 143 days
Jagat Narayan		Rajasthan	20 January 1958	16 December 1969	13 February 1973	3 years, 60 days	15 years, 25 days
Bhagwati Prasad Beri		Rajasthan	16 August 1960	14 February 1973	16 February 1975	2 years, 3 days	14 years, 185 days
Prakash Narayan Shinghal		Rajasthan	21 June 1961	17 February 1975	5 November 1975^{[‡]}	262 days	14 years, 138 days
Vedpal Tyagi		Rajasthan	13 September 1962	6 November 1975	27 December 1977	2 years, 52 days	15 years, 106 days
Chand Mal Lodha		Gauhati, transferred to Rajasthan	22 November 1967	6 July 1978	9 July 1980	2 years, 4 days	12 years, 231 days
Kalyan Dutt Sharma		Rajasthan	20 July 1973	7 January 1981	22 October 1983	2 years, 289 days	10 years, 95 days
Dwarka Prasad Gupta		Rajasthan	24 September 1973	12 April 1986	31 July 1986	111 days	12 years, 311 days
Mohan Lall Shrimal		Sikkim	7 October 1974	17 December 1983	3 January 1985	1 year, 18 days	10 years, 89 days
Guman Mal Lodha		Gauhati	1 May 1978	1 March 1988	15 March 1988	15 days	9 years, 320 days
Narendra Mohan Kasliwal		Himachal Pradesh	15 June 1978	29 March 1989	5 October 1989^{[‡]}	191 days	11 years, 113 days
Milap Chand Jain		Delhi	15 June 1978	28 November 1990	21 July 1991	236 days	13 years, 37 days
Kanta Kumari Bhatnagar		Madras	26 September 1978	15 June 1992	14 November 1992	153 days	14 years, 50 days
Surendra Nath Bhargava		Sikkim	20 October 1982	20 January 1993	10 February 1996	3 years, 22 days	13 years, 114 days
Ashok Kumar Mathur		Madhya Pradesh, transferred to Calcutta	13 July 1985	3 February 1996	6 June 2004^{[‡]}	8 years, 125 days	18 years, 330 days
Nagendra Kumar Jain		Madras, transferred to Karnataka	20 July 1990	13 September 2000	20 October 2004	4 years, 38 days	14 years, 93 days
Ganpat Singh Singhvi		Andhra Pradesh	20 July 1990	27 November 2005	11 November 2007^{[‡]}	1 year, 350 days	17 years, 115 days
Yad Ram Meena		Gujarat	20 July 1990	3 February 2007	30 June 2008	1 year, 149 days	17 years, 347 days
Rajesh Balia		Patna	21 October 1991	5 January 2008	3 March 2008	59 days	16 years, 135 days
Rajendra Mal Lodha	R. M. Lodha	Patna	31 January 1994	13 May 2008	16 December 2008^{[‡]}	218 days	14 years, 321 days
Bhagwati Prasad		Jharkhand	6 April 1996	22 August 2010	12 May 2011	264 days	15 years, 37 days
Prakash Chandra Tatia		Jharkhand	11 January 2001	11 September 2011	3 August 2013	1 year, 327 days	12 years, 205 days
Narendra Kumar Jain		Sikkim	2 September 2004	7 January 2014	7 October 2014	274 days	10 years, 36 days
Dinesh Maheshwari		Meghalaya, transferred to Karnataka	2 September 2004	24 February 2016	17 January 2019^{[‡]}	2 years, 328 days	14 years, 138 days
Ajay Rastogi		Tripura	2 September 2004	1 March 2018	2 November 2018^{[‡]}	247 days	14 years, 62 days
Govind Mathur		Allahabad	2 September 2004	14 November 2018	13 April 2021	2 years, 151 days	16 years, 224 days
Raghvendra Singh Chauhan		Telangana, transferred to Uttarakhand	13 June 2005	22 June 2019	23 December 2021	2 years, 185 days	16 years, 194 days
Mohammad Rafiq		Meghalaya, transferred to Orissa, then to Madhya Pradesh and again to Himachal Pradesh	15 May 2006	13 November 2019	24 May 2022	2 years, 193 days	15 years, 286 days
Munishwar Nath Bhandari		Madras	5 July 2007	14 February 2022	12 September 2022	211 days	15 years, 70 days
Sandeep Mehta		Gauhati	30 May 2011	15 February 2023	8 November 2023^{[‡]}	267 days	12 years, 163 days
Vijay Bishnoi		Gauhati	8 January 2013	5 February 2024	29 May 2025^{[‡]}	1 year, 114 days	12 years, 142 days
Arun Bhansali		Allahabad	8 January 2013	5 February 2024	Incumbent	2 years, 286 days	13 years, 314 days
Pushpendra Singh Bhati		Jammu & Kashmir	16 November 2016	9 September 2026	Incumbent	70 days	10 years, 2 days

=== Judges appointed as Acting Chief Justice ===
Name	Appointed as ACJ in HC of	Date of appointment as Judge	Period as Acting Chief Justice	Date of retirement	Tenure as ACJ	Tenure as Judge	Remarks	Ref..
Nawal Kishore	Rajasthan	29 August 1949	25 Jan 1950 – 1 Jan 1951	3 November 1951	342 days	2 years, 67 days	--	
Kanwar Lal Bapna	Rajasthan	29 August 1949	11 Aug 1958 – 27 Feb 1959	4 January 1960	201 days	10 years, 129 days	--	
Mohan Lal Joshi	Rajasthan	22 November 1971	1 Mar 1978 – 26 Apr 1978	30 June 1979	57 days	7 years, 221 days	--	
Mohan Lal Joshi	Rajasthan	22 November 1971	23 Sep 1978 – 11 Mar 1979	30 June 1979	170 days	7 years, 221 days	--	
Kalyan Dutt Sharma	Rajasthan	20 July 1973	10 Jul 1980 – 6 Jan 1981	22 October 1983	181 days	10 years, 95 days	Became permanent	
Dwarka Prasad Gupta	Rajasthan	24 September 1973	1 Oct 1985 – 11 Apr 1986	31 July 1986	193 days	12 years, 311 days	Became permanent	
G. M. Lodha	Rajasthan	1 May 1978	1 Aug 1986 – 31 Aug 1986	15 March 1988	31 days	9 years, 320 days	--	
M. C. Jain	Rajasthan	15 June 1978	23 May 1989 – 14 Apr 1990	21 July 1991	327 days	13 years, 37 days	--	
A. K. Mathur	Madhya Pradesh	13 July 1985	13 Oct 1995 – 2 Feb 1996	6 June 2004^{[‡]}	113 days	18 years, 330 days	Became permanent	
Navrang Lal Tibrewal	Rajasthan	20 July 1990	10 Apr 1998 – 25 May 1998	16 January 1999	46 days	8 years, 181 days	Appointed as Acting Governor of Rajasthan	
Navrang Lal Tibrewal	Rajasthan	20 July 1990	16 Jan 1999 – 17 Jan 1999	16 January 1999	2 days	8 years, 181 days	Retired as ACJ	
N. K. Jain	Madras	20 July 1990	20 Jan 1999 – 23 May 1999	20 October 2004	124 days	14 years, 93 days	--	
N. K. Jain	Madras	20 July 1990	27 Aug 1999 – 8 Sep 1999	20 October 2004	13 days	14 years, 93 days	--	
N. K. Jain	Madras	20 July 1990	7 Jun 2000 – 12 Sep 2000	20 October 2004	98 days	14 years, 93 days	Became permanent	
Megh Raj Calla	Rajasthan	20 July 1990	26 Nov 2001 – 1 Dec 2001	12 March 2003	65 days	12 years, 236 days	--	
Megh Raj Calla	Rajasthan	20 July 1990	3 Oct 2002 – 23 Dec 2002	12 March 2003	20 days	12 years, 236 days	--	
G. S. Singhvi	Punjab & Haryana	20 July 1990	15 Sep 2002 – 14 Oct 2002	11 November 2007^{[‡]}	30 days	17 years, 115 days	--	
G. S. Singhvi	Punjab & Haryana	20 July 1990	21 Feb 2005 – 25 Feb 2005	11 November 2007^{[‡]}	64 days	17 years, 115 days	Transferred to Gujarat	
Y. R. Meena	Rajasthan	20 July 1990	23 Oct 2004 – 11 Oct 2005	30 June 2008	354 days	17 years, 347 days	--	
Y. R. Meena	Gujarat	20 July 1990	3 Apr 2006 – 2 Feb 2007	30 June 2008	306 days	17 years, 347 days	Became permanent	
Rajesh Balia	Rajasthan	21 October 1991	16 Jun 2007 – 15 Jul 2007	3 March 2008	30 days	16 years, 135 days	--	
Rajesh Balia	Rajasthan	21 October 1991	12 Nov 2007 – 4 Jan 2008	3 March 2008	54 days	16 years, 135 days	Elevated as CJ of Patna	
P. C. Tatia	Jharkhand	11 January 2001	13 May 2011 – 10 Sep 2011	3 August 2013	121 days	12 years, 205 days	Became permanent	
Narendra Kumar Jain	Rajasthan	2 September 2004	14 Dec 2012 – 2 Jan 2013	7 October 2014	20 days	10 years, 36 days	--	
Narendra Kumar Jain	Sikkim	2 September 2004	2 Oct 2013 – 6 Jan 2014	7 October 2014	97 days	10 years, 36 days	Became permanent	
Ajay Rastogi	Rajasthan	2 September 2004	15 Apr 2016 – 13 May 2016	2 November 2018^{[‡]}	29 days	14 years, 62 days	--	
Govind Mathur	Allahabad	2 September 2004	24 Oct 2018 – 13 Nov 2018	13 April 2021	21 days	16 years, 224 days	Became permanent	
R. S. Chauhan	Telangana	13 June 2005	3 Apr 2019 – 21 Jun 2019	23 December 2021	80 days	16 years, 194 days	Became permanent	
Vineet Kothari	Madras	13 June 2005	7 Sep 2019 – 10 Nov 2019	2 September 2021	65 days	16 years, 82 days	--	
Vineet Kothari	Madras	13 June 2005	1 Jan 2021 – 3 Jan 2021	2 September 2021	3 days	16 years, 82 days	Transferred to Gujarat	
Vineet Kothari	Gujarat	13 June 2005	31 Aug 2021 – 2 Sep 2021	2 September 2021	220 days	16 years, 82 days	Retired as ACJ	
Mohammad Rafiq	Rajasthan	15 May 2006	7 Apr 2019 – 4 May 2019	24 May 2022	28 days	15 years, 286 days	--	
Mohammad Rafiq	Rajasthan	15 May 2006	23 Sep 2019 – 5 Oct 2019	24 May 2022	13 days	15 years, 286 days	--	
M. N. Bhandari	Allahabad	5 July 2007	26 Jun 2021 – 10 Oct 2021	12 September 2022	107 days	15 years, 70 days	--	
M. N. Bhandari	Madras	5 July 2007	22 Nov 2021 – 13 Feb 2022	12 September 2022	84 days	15 years, 70 days	Became permanent	
S. P. Sharma	Rajasthan	16 November 2016	28 Sep 2025 – 6 Sep 2026	26 September 2026	344 days	9 years, 315 days	--	

== Judges elevated to Supreme Court ==
This section includes the list of only those judges whose parent high court was Rajasthan. This includes those judges who, at the time of elevation to Supreme Court of India, may not be serving in Rajasthan High Court but this list does not include judges who at the time of elevation were serving in Rajasthan High Court but does not have Rajasthan as their Parent High Court.

Colour Key

- Female Judge
- Served as Chief Justice of India

Key

- ^{RES} Resigned
- ^{†} Died in office

#	Name of the Judge	Image	Date of Appointment		Date of Retirement	Tenure			Immediately preceding office
#	Name of the Judge	Image	In Parent High Court	In Supreme Court	Date of Retirement	In High Court(s)	In Supreme Court	Total tenure (Note: Includes both tenure as High Court Judge as well as Supreme Court Judge)	Immediately preceding office
1	Prakash Narayan Shinghal		21 June 1961	6 November 1975	14 October 1980	14 years, 138 days	4 years, 344 days	19 years, 116 days	9th CJ of Rajasthan HC
2	Narendra Mohan Kasliwal		15 June 1978	6 October 1989	3 April 1993	11 years, 113 days	3 years, 180 days	14 years, 293 days	16th CJ of Himachal Pradesh HC
3	Suresh Chandra Agrawal		15 June 1978	11 January 1990	4 September 1998	11 years, 210 days	8 years, 237 days	20 years, 82 days	Judge of Rajasthan HC
4	Ashok Kumar Mathur		13 July 1985	7 June 2004	7 August 2008	18 years, 330 days	4 years, 62 days	23 years, 26 days	31st CJ of Calcutta HC
5	Ganpat Singh Singhvi		20 July 1990	12 November 2007	12 December 2013	17 years, 115 days	6 years, 31 days	23 years, 146 days	CJ of erstwhile Andhra Pradesh HC
6	Rajendra Mal Lodha		31 January 1994	17 December 2008	27 September 2014	14 years, 321 days	5 years, 285 days	20 years, 240 days	33rd CJ of Patna HC
7	Ajay Rastogi		2 September 2004	2 November 2018	17 June 2023	14 years, 61 days	4 years, 228 days	18 years, 289 days	3rd CJ of Tripura HC
8	Dinesh Maheshwari		2 September 2004	18 January 2019	14 May 2023	14 years, 138 days	4 years, 117 days	18 years, 255 days	29th CJ of Karnataka HC
9	Sandeep Mehta		30 May 2011	9 November 2023	Incumbent	12 years, 163 days	3 years, 9 days	15 years, 172 days	41st CJ of Gauhati HC
10	Vijay Bishnoi		8 January 2013	30 May 2025	Incumbent	12 years, 142 days	1 year, 172 days	13 years, 314 days	42nd CJ of Gauhati HC

== Rajasthan High Court Bar Association, Jaipur ==
Rajasthan High Court Bar Association, Jaipur is a registered society of the Advocates practicing at Jaipur Bench of Rajasthan High Court. The body elects its office bearers through direct election every year.

== Statue of Manu ==
On 3 March 1989, the Rajasthan Judicial Officers Association sponsored by the Lions Club had installed a Manu idol in front of the lawn of the high court with the permission of the high court. Since its installation, the statue has been the subject of numerous protests, legal challenges, and even an order by judges calling for its removal.

== See also ==
- High courts of India
- List of chief justices of the Rajasthan High Court
- List of judges of the Rajasthan High Court
