= Daulat Mal Bhandari =

Indian judge (1907 - 2004)

6th Chief Justice of Rajasthan High Court
- In office 18 December 1968 – 15 December 1969
- Appointed by: Zakir Husain
- Preceded by: Durga Shakti Dave
- Succeeded by: Jagat Narayan

Judge of Rajasthan High Court
- In office 26 July 1955 – 17 December 1968
- Appointed by: Rajendra Prasad

Member of 1st Lok Sabha
- In office 1952–1955
- Speaker: G. V. Mavalankar
- Preceded by: Constituency established
- Succeeded by: Harish Chandra Sharma
- Constituency: Jaipur

Personal details
- Born: 16 December 1907 Jaipur, Rajasthan, India
- Died: 10 January 2004 (aged 96) Jaipur, Rajasthan, India
- Education: M.A. and LL.B
- Occupation: Chief Justice, Rajasthan High Court; Politician
- Known for: Chief Justice of Rajasthan High Court, Freedom fighter, Member of the first Lok Sabha

Daulat Mal Bhandari (16 December 1907 – 10 January 2004) was Chief Justice of Rajasthan High Court in India, a member of the first Lok Sabha and a freedom fighter.

== Career ==
Bhandari took active part in the freedom struggle. In 1942 he formed the "Azad Morcha" in Jaipur and staged satyagraha. He was imprisoned for nine months. He also organised 'Praja Mandal' in Jaipur State. During the partition of India, he contributed in the rehabilitation of refugees from Sindh and Western Punjab.

He served as the Development and Agriculture Minister of Jaipur State in 1947 on being elected to the state's Legislative Assembly. Bhandari was a member of the Lok Sabha from 1952 to 1955 representing the Indian National Congress and Jaipur parliamentary constituency of Rajasthan.

Bhandari was a senior advocate on the rolls of the Bar Council of India. He was appointed a judge of the Rajasthan High Court on 26 July 1955 and the Chief Justice there from 18 December 1968, to 15 December 1969.

He also served as Chairman of the Revenue Law Commission constituted by the Government of Rajasthan and as a member of the Krishna Godavari Water Dispute Tribunal constituted by the Government of India. He was a founder member of the Indian Law Institute in New Delhi. He also served as the Chairman of the Governing Body of the Lal Bahadur Shastri College, Jaipur. He had six sons.

Bhandari was born on 16 December 1907. He did MA LLB and practiced law from 1930 at Chief Court, Jaipur. Daulat Mal Bhandari died on 10 January 2004 at Jaipur, Rajasthan at the age of 97.

"My thoughts in that connection go particularly to… Mr Justice D.M. Bhandari…, who have rendered meritorious services to the cause of law and justice. Their noteworthy and valuable contribution in the development of law in the State of Rajasthan deserves special notice and admiration. They laid great traditions and sound foundations". Inaugural address of Justice A S Anand, CJI at the golden celebrations of the Raj HC

DM Bhandari, Justice: "Caste and religion have often exerted baneful influences on the body politic of the State to undermine its strength. These have more often than not been a source of breaking the solidarity of the State. In the political history of India, caste race and religion have played a part dividing the people from one another". AIR 1959 Raj 280

Justice Akil Kureshi referred to Justice Bhandari in his farewell speech as Chief Justice of Rajasthan High Court as an outstanding judge.
