= Sreelakshmi Suresh =

Indian web designer

Sreelakshmi
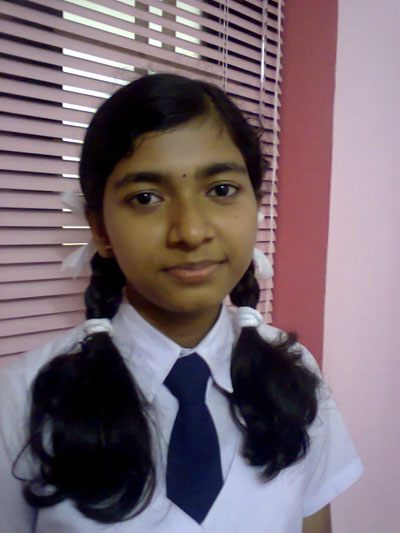
- Sreelakshmi Suresh in March 2012
- Born: 5 February 1998 (age 28); Kozhikode, Kerala, India
- Occupation: Web Designer

Sreelakshmi Suresh born in 1998 is a web designer from Kozhikode, Kerala, India. She is mainly known for her work designing websites in India which gained her media coverage as early as 2006. Sources have named other individuals as holding the titles of World's Youngest CEO and World's Youngest Web Designer.

== Early life ==
Sreelakshmi Suresh attended Presentation High Secondary School and designed her school's website, which was inaugurated by Binoy Viswam, Forest Minister, Government of Kerala, on 15 January 2007.

== Youngest title ==
The title of World's Youngest CEO and World's Youngest Web Designer has been liberally assigned to a number of individuals by various news media and sources. Some media have named Harli Jordean the "World's Youngest CEO" at age 8 and other sources, including the Press Information Bureau, have named Ajay Puri as the "World's Youngest Web Designer".

== Awards ==
Sreelakshmi Suresh is the recipient of multiple awards and other recognition. She was honoured by the Ministry of Women and Child Development (India), by conferring her the National Child Award for Exceptional Achievement in 2008. The award was presented to her by Sonia Gandhi in a function held at Vigyan Bhavan, New Delhi on 5 January 2009.
