= Chand Mal Lodha =

12th Chief Justice of Rajasthan High Court

Hon'ble Chief Justice Chand Mal Lodha

12th Chief Justice of Rajasthan High Court
- In office 12 March 1979 – 9 July 1980
- Nominated by: Y. V. Chandrachud
- Appointed by: Neelam Sanjiva Reddy
- Preceded by: C. Honniah; M. L. Joshi (acting)
- Succeeded by: Kalyan Dutt Sharma

12th Chief Justice of Gauhati High Court
- In office 6 July 1978 – 11 March 1979
- Nominated by: Y. V. Chandrachud
- Appointed by: Neelam Sanjiva Reddy
- Preceded by: M. Sadanand Swami
- Succeeded by: Baharul Islam

Judge of Madhya Pradesh High Court
- In office 28 June 1976 – 5 July 1978
- Nominated by: Ajit Nath Ray
- Appointed by: Fakhruddin Ali Ahmed

Judge of Rajasthan High Court
- In office 22 November 1967 – 27 June 1976
- Nominated by: Kailas Nath Wanchoo
- Appointed by: Zakir Husain

Personal details
- Born: 10 July 1918 Jodhpur, Rajasthan
- Died: 28 January 2012 (aged 93)
- Relations: Guman Mal Lodha (Brother); Rajendra Mal Lodha (Nephew); Mangal Lodha (Nephew)
- Education: Allahabad University (LL. B. and B.A.)

Chand Mal Lodha (10 July 1918 – 28 January 2012) was an Indian jurist who served as Chief Justice of the Gauhati High Court and the Rajasthan High Court. He also served as judge of Madhya Pradesh High Court.

== Life and family ==
He was born on 10 July 1918 at Jodhpur, Rajasthan. His brothers, Srikrishna Mal Lodha, and Guman Mal Lodha served as a judge of the Rajasthan High Court. While his nephews were R. M. Lodha, who went on to become the Chief Justice of India and Mangal Prabhat Lodha, who is businessman and politician.

He completed his B. A. and LL.B. from the University of Allahabad in 1940, securing first position and winning several awards and gold medals. He enrolled as advocate in chief court of Mewar and started practising law in July 1942. He enrolled as advocate with Rajasthan High Court in January 1950 and with Supreme Court of India in October 1954. He later served as the Honorary Secretary of the Rajasthan Bar Council in 1954. From 1958 to 1965, he was associated with the Standing Council of Income Tax in Delhi.

== Career ==
Lodha was appointed a judge of the Rajasthan High Court on 22 November 1967. In June 1976, he was transferred to the Madhya Pradesh High Court, where he served until July 1978. He subsequently became Chief Justice of the Gauhati High Court in July 1978. In March 1979, he was transferred to the Rajasthan High Court as its Chief Justice and served until his retirement in July 1980.

After retirement, he continued his involvement in legal and public life, practising as a Senior Advocate before the Supreme Court of India until 1996 and participating in social and charitable activities. He also served as chairman of the Institute of Trade and Industry from 1985. He died on 28 January 2012.
