= Nagendra Kumar Jain =

Indian judge

Hon'ble Justice Nagendra Kumar Jain
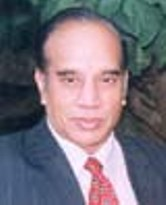
- Justice Nagendra Kumar Jain

Chairman, Rajasthan State Human rights Commission
- In office 16 July 2005 – 15 July 2010

President, Shri Mahavirji
- In office February 2011 – February 2013

Lokayukta, Himachal Pradesh
- In office November 2004 – 15 July 2005

Chairperson, Himachal Pradesh State Human Rights Commission
- In office 24 November 2004 – 15 July 2005

Chief Justice of Karnataka High Court
- In office 31 August 2001 – 19 October 2004

Chief Justice of Madras High Court
- In office 13 September 2000 – 30 August 2001

Member of Academic Council of National Law School of India University
- In office 1993–1996

Judge of Rajasthan High Court
- In office 20 July 1990 – 18 December 1997

Personal details
- Born: 20 October 1942 (age 83) Alwar, Rajasthan
- Education: University of Jodhpur

Justice Nagendra Kumar Jain is an Indian judge, and the current chairman of Bar Council of Rajasthan. He was also invited to discuss the reforms in the judiciary by Parliamentary Estimate committee in 1985. He became a member of the Bar council of India and Member of Executive and governing council of National Law School of India University in 1986.

== Early life ==
He was born on 20 October 1942 in Alwar, Rajasthan and completed his primary education from Happy School. Later he shifted to Jaipur for his higher education and completed his secondary education from Mahaveer School. He further continued his education from Maharaja College, Jaipur and graduated from Rajasthan College of Rajasthan University. He also represented the state in several National and interstate Badminton tournaments from 1955 to 1968 and in 1977 he also played Nationals in veterans.

== Career ==
After receiving his Bachelor of Laws (LLB) degree from Jodhpur University in 1967, he was enrolled as an advocate on 26 January 1968 in Rajasthan High Court and started his practice with emphasis on Civil, Criminal, Constitutional, Writ, Company and Taxation Matters. He also worked as a part-time Lecturer in Jodhpur University and served on the following positions before being appointed Judge of Rajasthan High court.

- Secretary of the Rajasthan High Court Bar Association, Jaipur
- Member of Rajasthan Bar Federation
- Lifetime Member of Bar Association of India and Executive Member 1984~86.
- Member Executive and Governing Council National Law School of India University
- Member Bar Council of Rajasthan since 1971 till elevation
- Chairman Bar Council of Rajasthan 1985-86
- Member, Bar Council of India and India 1987 till elevation (trust)

He became a Judge of Rajasthan High Court on 20 July 1990. He spent around six years at Jodhpur and about 16 months at Jaipur bench as a Judge. He was transferred to Madras High Court on 18 November 1997. He officiated as Chief Justice on 22 January 1999 till May 1999, 28 September to 9 October 1999 then 6 June till becoming permanent Chief Justice in Madras High Court on 13 September 2000. Thereafter he was transferred as Chief Justice of Karnataka High Court on 31 August 2001 and superannuated on 19 October 2004. Some of the important milestones of his Judicial career are as follows:

- Judge in the Rajasthan High Court from 20 July 1990 till 18 December 1997
- Nominated by Chief Justice of India as Member of Academic Council of National Law School of India, Bangalore from 1993 to 1996
- Judge in the Madras High Court from 18 November 1997 till 21 January 1999.
- Chief Justice of Madras High Court from 13 September 2000 till 30 August 2001
- Chief Justice of Karnataka High Court from 31 August 2001 till 19 October 2004
- Chairperson, Himachal Pradesh Human Rights Commission from 24 November 2004 till 15 July 2005
  Lokayukta, Himachal Pradesh till 15 July 2005
- Chairperson of the Rajasthan State Human rights Commission from 16 July 2005 till 15 July 2010

=== Rajasthan State Human rights Commission ===
- List of incidents reported and addressed along with documentation of the cases reported in the previous year before his tenure began.

From	Till	Child	Health	Prison	Gang	Labor	SC / ST	Police	Pollution	Religious	Woman	Others	Rejected	Total
1 April 2004	31 March 2005	13	43	94	19	01	19	819	16	29	92	125	2002	3272
1 April 2005	31 March 2006	18	50	84	48	08	41	867	12	48	130	112	2317	3735
1 April 2006	31 March 2007	20	30	80	38	12	16	1002	16	54	158	158	2306	3890
1 April 2007	31 March 2008	24	38	63	08	08	27	997	17	33	186	317	2126	3844
1 April 2008	31 March 2009	36	34	57	26	06	39	1121	14	27	191	331	2095	3977
1 April 2009	31 March 2010	18	05	98	161	03	96	768	08	19	142	407	1526	3251

=== President of the Management Committee Shri Mahavirji ===
He is a lifetime member of this working committee since January 1997 and contributes his efforts on regular basis. Under his presidency February 2011~14, he took the effort to publish an Introduction of the members of this committee since its inception in the year 1930, to highlight their contributions and motivate fellow members. He has broadly categorized his scope of work beyond the routine set of functions and activities which are regularly organised by the committee under the following heading.

A stamp was released with pictorial view of the temple along with the seal on postcard on 13th Rajpex 2012.

== Recent activities ==
Following his retirement from the bench, Jain has campaigned against child marriage, organised by Help Educate Children (HEC) and Awareness for Training, Motivation and Action (ATMA) supported by UNICEF India.

== Publications ==
List of his publications during his tenure as Chairperson of Rajasthan Human Rights Commission:

- Human Rights according to Article-21 of the Constitution of India.
- Human Rights & Duties according to Article-51(A).
- Points to remember on Human Rights Day.
- Human Rights and HIV/AIDS.
- Policies & Procedures of working of Human Rights Commission.
- Rules & Regulations of Human Rights Commission
- Human Rights for Children.
- Human Rights for Women.
- Human Rights for schedule caste & tribes with special privileges.
- Human Rights in reference to arrest.
- Human Rights in reference to imprisonment or jail.
- Human Rights in reference to MLA Scheme.
- Human Rights in reference to Government Development schemes.
