= Navrang Lal Tibrewal =

Indian politician (1937–2024)

Acting Governor of Rajasthan
- In office 25 May 1998 – 16 January 1999
- Preceded by: Darbara Singh
- Succeeded by: Sukhdev Singh Kang

Acting Chief Justice of the Rajasthan High Court
- In office 10 April 1998 – August 1999
- Preceded by: M. P. Singh
- Succeeded by: Akil Kureshi (acting)

Personal details
- Born: January 17, 1937 Jhunjhunu district, Rajasthan, India
- Died: January 8, 2024 (aged 86) Rajasthan, India
- Parent: Ladu Ram Tibrewal
- Education: Maharaja College, Jaipur; University Law College, University of Rajasthan
- Occupation: Judge, lawyer

Navrang Lal Tibrewal (17 January 1937 – 8 January 2024) was an Indian judge who served as the acting Governor of Rajasthan and the acting Chief Justice of the Rajasthan High Court. He held important legal and administrative roles during his career and was involved in legal reform and public service in Rajasthan.

== Early life and education ==
Tibrewal was born in the Jhunjhunu district of Rajasthan. He completed his undergraduate studies at Maharaja College, Jaipur, and obtained his law degree (LL.B.) from the University Law College, University of Rajasthan, in 1959.

== Career ==
Tibrewal began practicing law in the district courts of Jhunjhunu after a brief apprenticeship. In 1965, he moved his practice to the Rajasthan High Court in Jodhpur. With the establishment of the Jaipur bench in 1977, he shifted to Jaipur.

He was elected Chairman of the Bar Council of Rajasthan in 1982. On 20 July 1990, he was appointed as a judge of the Rajasthan High Court. Following the retirement of Justice M. P. Singh in April 1998, Tibrewal was appointed acting Chief Justice of the Rajasthan High Court.

On 25 May 1998, he took charge as the acting Governor of Rajasthan, a position he held until 16 January 1999. His tenure included oversight of administrative functions during a transitional political period.

== Death ==
Tibrewal died on 8 January 2024 at the age of 86. His funeral was held in his ancestral village. The Vice President of India, Jagdeep Dhankhar, expressed condolences, describing him as a figure who upheld "professional ethics and dignity" in public life.
