= Milap Chand Jain =

Former Chief Justice in Delhi, India

Governor of Rajasthan (Acting)
- In office 3 February 1990 – 14 February 1990
- Preceded by: Sukhdev Prasad
- Succeeded by: D. P. Chattopadhyaya

Personal details
- Born: 21 July 1929 Jodhpur
- Died: 29 April 2015 (aged 85) Jaipur, Rajasthan

Milap Chand Jain (21 July 1929 – 29 April 2015) was a former Chief Justice of the Delhi High Court.

He was born in 1929 in Jodhpur, Rajasthan. After obtaining his B. Com. and LLM degrees, he was appointed a judge of the Rajasthan High Court in 1978, and he later rose to become the Chief Justice. He was also the chairman of the Jain Commission set up by the Government of India to inquire into Rajiv Gandhi's assassination.
