= Sambhaji Shiwaji Shinde =

Former Chief Justice of Rajasthan High Court

Hon'ble Chief Justice (Retd.) Sambhaji Shiwaji Shinde

Chief Justice of Rajasthan High Court
- In office 21 June 2022 – 1 August 2022
- Nominated by: N. V. Ramana
- Appointed by: Ram Nath Kovind

Judge of Bombay High Court
- In office 11 March 2008 – 20 June 2022
- Nominated by: K. G. Balakrishnan
- Appointed by: Pratibha Patil

Personal details
- Born: 2 August 1960 (age 66)
- Education: Dr. Babasaheb Ambedkar Marathwada University; Warwick University

Sambhaji Shiwaji Shinde (born 2 August 1960) is a retired Indian judge who served as a judge of Bombay High Court and then as Chief Justice of Rajasthan High Court.

== Career ==
He was born on 2 August 1960. He completed L.L.B. from Dr. Babasaheb Ambedkar Marathwada University and L.L.M. from Warwick University, United Kingdom. On 9 April 1987 he was enrolled as an Advocate and started practice in the year 1989. He was elevated as an Additional Judge of Bombay High Court on 11 March 2008 and made Permanent Judge on 13 March 2010. He was elevated as Chief Justice of Rajasthan High Court on 21 June 2022. He was retired on 1 August 2022.
