= List of current Indian chief justices =

Overview of current Indian chief justices

The Indian judiciary consists of the Supreme Court of India, which is the highest court in the country and the constituent courts. The Supreme Court serves as the final court of appeal for all civil and criminal cases in India and consists of 37 judges headed by the Chief Justice of India. The High Courts are the top judicial bodies in individual states, controlled and managed by Chief Justices of the respective courts. There are 25 High Courts in the country with seven of them having multiple jurisdictions. The last high courts created in India are the High Court of Telangana and the Andhra Pradesh High Court, both established on 1 January 2019, following the bifurcation of the state of Andhra Pradesh. The High Courts of India manage a system of sub-ordinate courts headed by the various District and Session Courts in their respective jurisdictions. As per the Constitution of India, the Chief Justice, the other judges of the Supreme Court and the High Courts are appointed by the President of India.

== Chief Justice of India ==
Name	Surya Kant (list)
Image	
Date of elevation to Supreme Court	24 May 2019 (7 years, 178 days)
Date of Appointment as CJI	24 November 2025 (359 days)
Date of Retirement	9 February 2027 (−83 days)
Tenure	1 year, 78 days
Nominated By	B. R. Gavai
Appointed By	Droupadi Murmu
Seniority rank on the date of elevation	11
Date of Initial Appointment as Judge	9 January 2004 (22 years, 313 days)
Parent High Court	Punjab and Haryana

== List of chief justices of High Courts ==
High Court	Portrait	Chief Justice	Date of Appointment as Chief Justice	Date of Retirement	Tenure	Nominated as Chief Justice by	Appointed By	Parent High Court	All India seniority rank	Date of Initial Appointment as Judge	Nominated as Judge of by	Remarks	Ref.
Allahabad High Court		Arun Bhansali (list)	5 February 2024 (2 years, 286 days)	14 October 2029 (−2 years, 330 days)	5 years, 252 days	D. Y. Chandrachud	Droupadi Murmu	Rajasthan	4 Since 16 November 2026	8 January 2013 (13 years, 314 days)	Altamas Kabir		
Andhra Pradesh High Court		Lisa Gill (list)	25 April 2026 (207 days)	16 November 2028 (−1 year, 364 days)	2 years, 206 days	Surya Kant	Droupadi Murmu	Punjab and Haryana	27 Since 16 November 2026	31 March 2014 (12 years, 232 days)	P. Sathasivam		
Bombay High Court		Mahesh Chandra Tripathi (list)	9 September 2026 (70 days)	20 June 2028 (−1 year, 215 days)	1 year, 286 days	Surya Kant	Droupadi Murmu	Allahabad	13 Since 16 November 2026	27 September 2013 (13 years, 52 days)	P. Sathasivam		
Calcutta High Court		Ravindra Vithalrao Ghuge (list)	9 September 2026 (70 days)	8 July 2028 (−1 year, 233 days)	1 year, 304 days	Surya Kant	Droupadi Murmu	Bombay	10 Since 16 November 2026	21 June 2013 (13 years, 150 days)	Altamas Kabir		
Chhattisgarh High Court		Krushna Ram Mohapatra (list)	7 September 2026 (72 days)	17 April 2027 (−150 days)	223 days	Surya Kant	Droupadi Murmu	Orissa	38 Since 16 November 2026	17 April 2015 (11 years, 215 days)	H. L. Dattu		
Delhi High Court		Nitin Wasudeo Sambre^{[†]} (list)	6 October 2026 (43 days)	18 December 2029 (−3 years, 30 days)	3 years, 74 days	--	Droupadi Murmu	Bombay	19	6 January 2014 (12 years, 316 days)	P. Sathasivam		
Gauhati High Court		Ashutosh Kumar (list)	21 July 2025 (1 year, 120 days)	30 September 2028 (−1 year, 317 days)	3 years, 72 days	B. R. Gavai	Droupadi Murmu	Patna	28 Since 16 November 2026	15 May 2014 (12 years, 187 days)	R. M. Lodha		
Gujarat High Court		Manash Ranjan Pathak^{[†]} (list)	6 October 2026 (43 days)	27 August 2027 (−282 days)	326 days	--	Droupadi Murmu	Gauhati	7	22 May 2013 (13 years, 180 days)	Altamas Kabir		
Himachal Pradesh High Court		Gurmeet Singh Sandhawalia (list)	29 December 2024 (1 year, 324 days)	31 October 2027 (−347 days)	2 years, 307 days	D. Y. Chandrachud	Droupadi Murmu	Punjab and Haryana	2 Since 16 November 2026	30 September 2011 (15 years, 49 days)	S. H. Kapadia		
Jammu & Kashmir and Ladakh High Court		Pushpendra Singh Bhati (list)	9 September 2026 (70 days)	20 September 2032 (−5 years, 307 days)	6 years, 12 days	Surya Kant	Droupadi Murmu	Rajasthan	68 Since 16 November 2026	16 November 2016 (10 years, 2 days)	T. S. Thakur		
Jharkhand High Court		Mahesh Sharadchandra Sonak (list)	9 January 2026 (313 days)	27 November 2026 (−9 days)	323 days	Surya Kant	Droupadi Murmu	Bombay	9 Since 16 November 2026	21 June 2013 (13 years, 150 days)	Altamas Kabir		
Karnataka High Court		Vibhu Bakhru (list)	19 July 2025 (1 year, 122 days)	1 November 2028 (−1 year, 349 days)	3 years, 106 days	B. R. Gavai	Droupadi Murmu	Delhi	5 Since 16 November 2026	17 April 2013 (13 years, 215 days)	Altamas Kabir		
Kerala High Court		Soumen Sen (list)	8 October 2025 (1 year, 41 days); Date of appointment in current HC; 10 January 2026 (312 days)	26 July 2027 (−250 days)	1 year, 292 days Tenure in current HC; 1 year, 198 days	B. R. Gavai; Nominated in current HC; Surya Kant	Droupadi Murmu	Calcutta	1 Since 16 November 2026	13 April 2011 (15 years, 219 days)	S. H. Kapadia	14th CJ of Meghalaya (8 October 2025 – 9 January 2026)	
Madhya Pradesh High Court		Alpesh Yeshvant Kogje (list)	10 September 2026 (69 days)	15 July 2031 (−4 years, 239 days)	4 years, 309 days	Surya Kant	Droupadi Murmu	Gujarat	40 Since 16 November 2026	6 April 2016 (10 years, 226 days)	T. S. Thakur		
Madras High Court		Sushrut Arvind Dharmadhikari (list)	6 March 2026 (257 days)	7 July 2028 (−1 year, 232 days)	2 years, 124 days	Surya Kant	Droupadi Murmu	Madhya Pradesh	43 Since 16 November 2026	7 April 2016 (10 years, 225 days)	T. S. Thakur		
Manipur High Court		M. Sundar (list)	15 September 2025 (1 year, 64 days)	18 July 2028 (−1 year, 243 days)	2 years, 308 days	B. R. Gavai	Droupadi Murmu	Madras	52 Since 16 November 2026	5 October 2016 (10 years, 44 days)	T. S. Thakur		
Meghalaya High Court		Revati Prashant Mohite Dere (list)	10 January 2026 (312 days)	16 April 2027 (−149 days)	1 year, 97 days	Surya Kant	Droupadi Murmu	Bombay	8 Since 16 November 2026	21 June 2013 (13 years, 150 days)	Altamas Kabir		
Orissa High Court		Bibhu Prasad Routray^{[†]} (list)	16 November 2026 (2 days)	31 January 2032 (−5 years, 74 days)	5 years, 77 days	--	Droupadi Murmu	Orissa	198	8 November 2019 (7 years, 10 days)	Ranjan Gogoi		
Patna High Court		Valluri Kameswar Rao (list)	13 September 2026 (66 days)	6 August 2027 (−261 days)	328 days	Surya Kant	Droupadi Murmu	Delhi	6 Since 16 November 2026	17 April 2013 (13 years, 215 days)	Altamas Kabir		
Punjab & Haryana High Court		Ashwani Kumar Mishra (list)	7 September 2026 (72 days)	15 November 2030 (−3 years, 362 days)	4 years, 70 days	Surya Kant	Droupadi Murmu	Allahabad	25 Since 16 November 2026	3 February 2014 (12 years, 288 days)	P. Sathasivam		
Rajasthan High Court		Sanjay Kumar Agrawal (list)	7 September 2026 (72 days)	14 July 2027 (−238 days)	311 days	Surya Kant	Droupadi Murmu	Chhattisgarh	11 Since 16 November 2026	16 September 2013 (13 years, 63 days)	P. Sathasivam		
Sikkim High Court		Muhamed Mustaque Ayumantakath (list)	4 January 2026 (318 days)	31 May 2029 (−2 years, 194 days)	3 years, 148 days	Surya Kant	Droupadi Murmu	Kerala	22 Since 16 November 2026	23 January 2014 (12 years, 299 days)	P. Sathasivam		
Telangana High Court		Puthichira Sam Koshy^{[†]} (list)	6 October 2026 (43 days)	29 April 2029 (−2 years, 162 days)	2 years, 206 days	--	Droupadi Murmu	Chhattisgarh	12	16 September 2013 (13 years, 63 days)	P. Sathasivam		
Tripura High Court		Mamidanna Satyaratna Ramachandra Rao (list)	30 May 2023 (3 years, 172 days); Date of appointment in current HC; 22 July 2025 (1 year, 119 days)	6 August 2028 (−1 year, 262 days)	5 years, 69 days Tenure in current HC; 3 years, 16 days	D. Y. Chandrachud; Nominated in current HC; B. R. Gavai	Droupadi Murmu	Telangana	3 Since 16 November 2026	29 June 2012 (14 years, 142 days)	S. H. Kapadia	28th CJ of Himachal Pradesh (30 May 2023 – 24 September 2024) and 16th CJ of Jharkhand (25 September 2024 – 21 July 2025)	
Uttarakhand High Court		Manoj Kumar Tiwari^{[†]} (list)	9 October 2026 (40 days)	18 September 2027 (−304 days)	345 days	--	Droupadi Murmu	Uttarakhand	77	19 May 2017 (9 years, 183 days)	J. S. Khehar		

Key
- ^{†} Acting Chief Justice

Dates of Changes in Seniority Rank (S.R.):

16 November 2026 - Retirement of Harish Tandon (CJ of Orissa) on 15 November 2026 (S.R. 1)

== See also ==
- List of current Indian governors
- List of current Indian lieutenant governors and administrators
- List of current Indian chief ministers
- List of current Indian deputy chief ministers
- List of current Indian legislative speakers and chairpersons
- List of current Indian opposition leaders
- List of female chief justices in India
- List of sitting judges of the Supreme Court of India
- List of former judges of the Supreme Court of India
- List of female judges of the Supreme Court of India
- List of sitting judges of the high courts of India
- List of former chief justices of the high courts of India
- List of former acting chief justices of the high courts of India
