= Narendra Kumar Vyas =

Indian Chhattisgarh High Court judge

Justice Narendra Kumar Vyas

Judge of the Chhattisgarh High Court
- Incumbent
- Assumed office 22 March 2021
- Succeeded by: President of India

Personal details
- Born: October 5, 1970 (age 55) Raipur, Chhattisgarh, India
- Education: Pt. Ravishankar University, Raipur
- Profession: Jurist

Justice Narendra Kumar Vyas is an Indian jurist who serves as a judge of the Chhattisgarh High Court. He was appointed as an Assistant Solicitor General of India and served until 22 September 2017.

== Early life and education ==
Vyas was born on 5 October 1970 in Raipur and completed his schooling at St. Paul's Higher Secondary School in Raipur. He completed his Bachelor of Science and Bachelor of Laws (LL.B.) from Pt. Ravishankar University, Raipur, in 1995.

== Judicial appointment ==
Vyas was appointed as an Additional Judge of the Chhattisgarh High Court on 22 March 2021.

== Rulings ==
In February 2025, Vyas made international news after ruling that a husband cannot be punished for raping their wife and acquitted Gorakhnath Sharma who killed his underage wife while committing an unnatural sexual act. He ruled that unnatural sex with one's wife, even without her consent, does not lead to a punishable offence. This sparked outrage with activists demanding immediate reform of the Indian Justice System.
