= Pritinker Diwaker =

50th Chief Justice of Allahabad High Court

Hon'ble Chief Justice (Retd.) Pritinker Diwaker
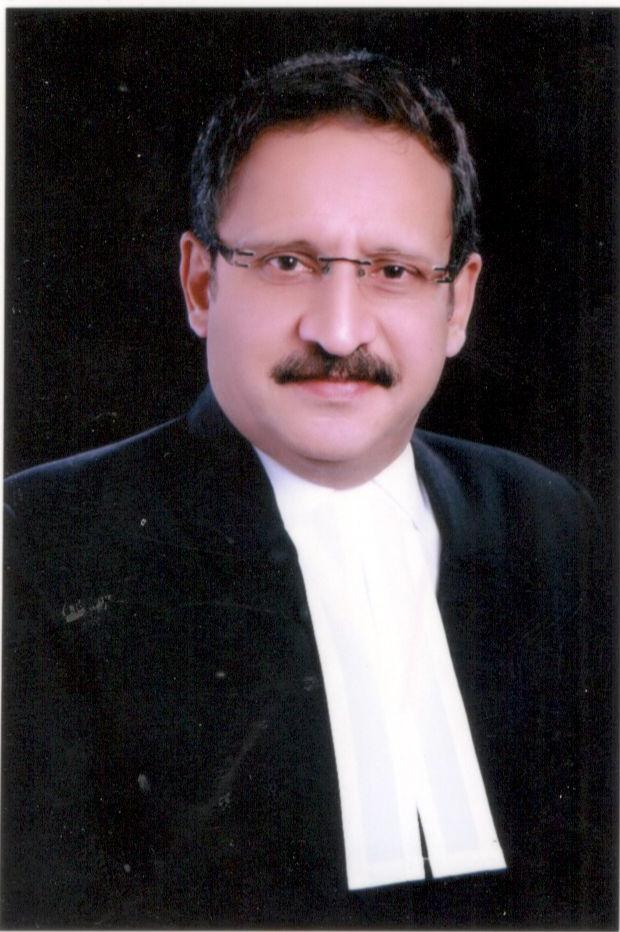

50th Chief Justice of Allahabad High Court
- In office 26 March 2023 – 21 November 2023
- Nominated by: D. Y. Chandrachud
- Appointed by: Droupadi Murmu
- Preceded by: Rajesh Bindal
- Succeeded by: Arun Bhansali; M. K. Gupta (acting)

Judge of Allahabad High Court
- In office 3 October 2018 – 25 March 2023; Acting CJ : 13 February 2023–25 March 2023
- Nominated by: Dipak Misra
- Appointed by: Ram Nath Kovind

Judge of Chhattisgarh High Court
- In office 31 March 2009 – 2 October 2018
- Nominated by: K. G. Balakrishnan
- Appointed by: Pratibha Patil
- Acting Chief Justice
- In office 17 February 2017 – 17 March 2017
- Appointed by: Pranab Mukherjee
- Preceded by: Deepak Gupta
- Succeeded by: T. B. Radhakrishnan

Personal details
- Born: 22 November 1961 (age 64)
- Education: Durgawati University (LL.B)

Pritinker Diwaker (born 22 November 1961) is a retired Indian judge who served as the 50th Chief Justice of the Allahabad High Court. He is also a former Judge of Chhattisgarh High Court.

== Education and career ==
Diwaker was born on 22 November 1961. He completed his B. A. and graduated in law from Durgawati University, Jabalpur. He enrolled as an advocate on 4 August 1984. He initially practised for approximately 16 years before the Madhya Pradesh High Court and subsequently spent about nine years practising before the Chhattisgarh High Court. His practice covered civil, criminal, constitutional and labour matters, with criminal and constitutional law identified as his principal areas of specialisation. His professional engagements included serving as government counsel for the State of Madhya Pradesh in 1992 and as standing counsel for several public-sector undertakings, banks and other institutions. These included the Steel Authority of India Limited, State Bank of India, Chhattisgarh Gramin Bank, Bank of Baroda, IDBI, Madhya Pradesh State Financial Corporation, Kotak Mahindra Bank and the Central Board of Secondary Education. He was designated a Senior Advocate by the Chhattisgarh High Court on 13 January 2005. He also served on the Madhya Pradesh State Bar Council for seven years and the Chhattisgarh State Bar Council for five years.

== Judicial career ==
Diwaker was appointed an Additional Judge of the Chhattisgarh High Court on 31 March 2009 and became a permanent judge on 10 September 2013. His tenure there lasted until 2 October 2018. His reported judicial work covered criminal appeals, constitutional questions and disputes involving public administration. In Chhattisgarh High Court he also served as Acting Chief Justice after elevation of Chief Justice of Deepak Gupta to Supreme Court of India.

In January 2018, the Supreme Court Collegium recommended his transfer from the Chhattisgarh High Court to the Allahabad High Court. He had made a representation against the proposed transfer, but the Collegium declined to reconsider its recommendation and reiterated it on 7 September 2018, citing the interests of the administration of justice. The transfer was subsequently notified, and he joined the Allahabad High Court on 3 October 2018.

== As Chief Justice ==
After the elevation of Chief Justice of Allahabad High Court, Rajesh Bindal to the Supreme Court, Diwaker became Acting Chief Justice of the Allahabad High Court on 13 February 2023. On 9 February 2023, the Supreme Court Collegium recommended him for appointment as Chief Justice, noting that he was the senior-most puisne judge of that High Court and considered suitable for the position.

He was appointed the 50th Chief Justice of the Allahabad High Court and took the oath of office on 26 March 2023. The oath was administered by Uttar Pradesh Governor Anandiben Patel.

=== Suppression ===
During his tenure as Chief Justice of the Allahabad High Court, On 16 May 2023, the Supreme Court Collegium recommended Justice Prashant Kumar Mishra, then Chief Justice of the Andhra Pradesh High Court, for elevation to the Supreme Court, although Diwaker, who was then Chief Justice of the Allahabad High Court, was senior to him. The Collegium acknowledged this difference in seniority but cited the absence of representation from the Chhattisgarh High Court in the Supreme Court and considered Mishra’s judicial experience and judgments in recommending his appointment. No adverse finding against Diwaker was recorded in the resolution, nor was a detailed comparative assessment of the two judges published. Diwaker retired on 21 November 2023 without being elevated to the Supreme Court.

During his speech at his farewell ceremony in November 2023, Diwaker criticised the circumstances surrounding his transfer from the Chhattisgarh High Court to the Allahabad High Court in October 2018. He alleged that the transfer, ordered by the Supreme Court Collegium headed by then Chief Justice of India Dipak Misra, appeared to have been made with an “ill intention to harass” him, although he said the reasons for the decision remained unknown to him. Describing the transfer as a misfortune that eventually became a blessing, he acknowledged the support he received from fellow judges and members of the Bar at Allahabad. He also thanked incumbent Chief Justice of India D. Y. Chandrachud for “rectifying the injustice done to me,” referring to his subsequent appointment as Chief Justice of the Allahabad High Court in March 2023.
