= Arup Kumar Goswami =

14th Chief Justice of Chhattisgarh High Court

Hon'ble Chief Justice (Retd.) Arup Kumar Goswami
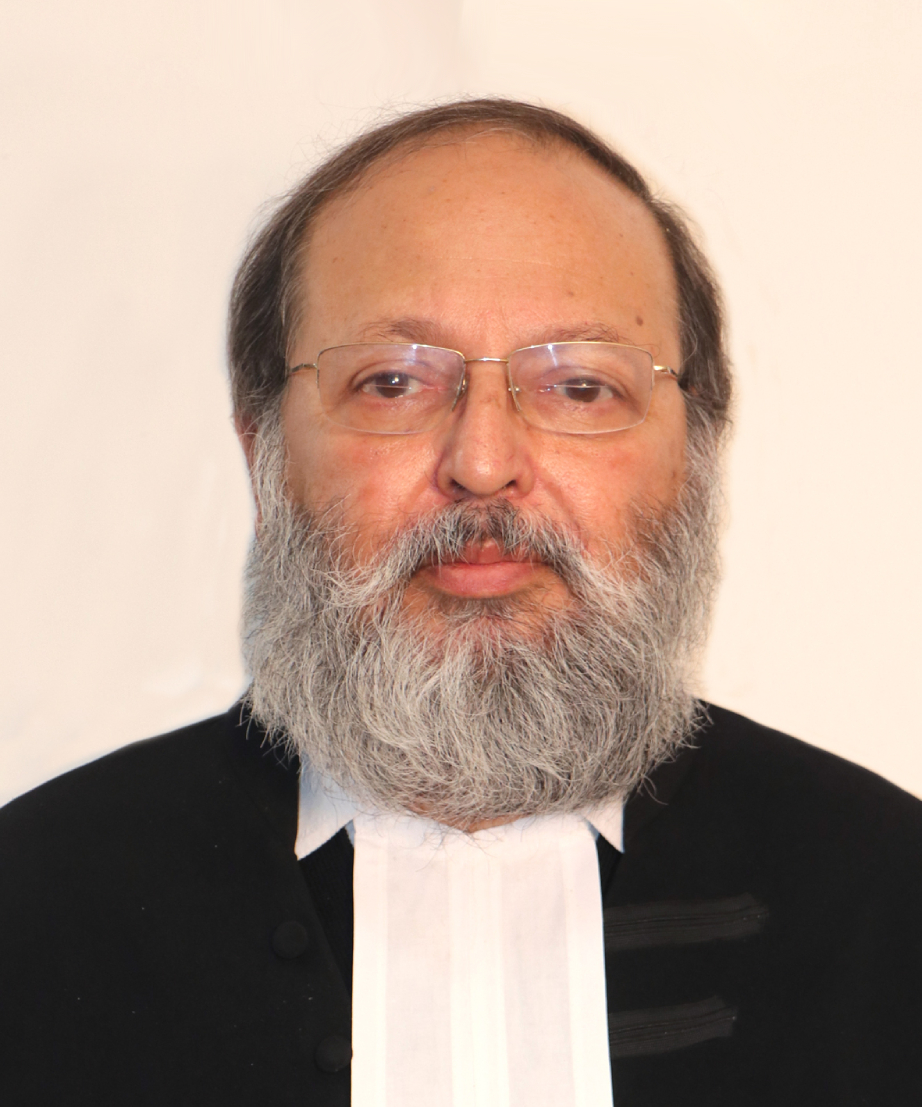

14th Chief Justice of Chhattisgarh High Court
- In office 12 October 2021 – 10 March 2023
- Nominated by: N. V. Ramana
- Appointed by: Ram Nath Kovind
- Preceded by: P. R. Ramachandra Menon; P. K. Mishra (acting)
- Succeeded by: Ramesh Sinha; Goutam Bhaduri (acting)

2nd Chief Justice of Andhra Pradesh High Court
- In office 6 January 2021 – 11 October 2021
- Nominated by: Sharad Arvind Bobde
- Appointed by: Ram Nath Kovind
- Preceded by: J. K. Maheshwari
- Succeeded by: P. K. Mishra

21st Chief Justice of Sikkim High Court
- In office 15 October 2019 – 5 January 2021
- Nominated by: Ranjan Gogoi
- Appointed by: Ram Nath Kovind
- Preceded by: Vijay Kumar Bist; M. M. Rai (acting)
- Succeeded by: J. K. Maheshwari

Judge of the Gauhati High Court
- In office 24 January 2011 – 14 October 2019
- Nominated by: S. H. Kapadia
- Appointed by: Pratibha Patil
- Acting Chief Justice
- In office 24 May 2019 – 6 October 2019
- Appointed by: Ram Nath Kovind
- Preceded by: A. S. Bopanna
- Succeeded by: Ajai Lamba
- In office 6 September 2018 – 28 October 2018
- Appointed by: Ram Nath Kovind
- Preceded by: Ajit Singh
- Succeeded by: A. S. Bopanna

Personal details
- Born: 11 March 1961 (age 65) Jorhat, Assam
- Education: Graduation in Economics (Hons.) and LL.B
- Alma mater: Cotton College, Gauhati, Government Law College, Gauhati

Justice Arup Kumar Goswami (born 11 March 1961) is a retired Indian judge, a former chief justice of three high courts of India (Chhattisgarh, Andhra Pradesh and Sikkim) and a former judge of the Gauhati High Court where he also served as Acting Chief Justice twice.

== Early life and career ==
=== As advocate ===
Graduated in Economics (Hons.) from Cotton College under Gauhati University in 1981. Obtained LL.B. Degree from Government Law College, Guwahati in 1985. Enrolled as an Advocate with the Bar Council of Assam, Nagaland, Meghalaya, Manipur, Tripura, Mizoram and Arunachal Pradesh on 16 August 1985. Practiced mainly on the Civil, Criminal, Constitutional and Service matters.

Was designated as Senior Advocate by the Gauhati High Court on 21 December 2004.

Was Standing Counsel of the Gauhati High Court, Karbi-Anglong Autonomous Council and North Cachar Hills Autonomous Council. Had also been a Senior Standing Counsel, Education Department, Government of Assam.

== As judge ==
He was appointed an Additional Judge of the Gauhati High Court on 24 January 2011 and became a permanent Judge on 7 November 2012. He was the Executive Chairman of Nagaland State Legal Services Authority from 1 April 2011 to 12 August 2013. He also served as the Executive Chairman of Assam State Legal Services Authority from 6 June 2018 to 14 October 2019 and the Executive Chairman of Arunachal Pradesh State Legal Services Authority from 8 March 2016 to 14 October 2019.

He was appointed as Chief Justice (Acting) of the Gauhati High Court from 6 September 2018 to 29 October 2018 and also from 24 May 2019 to 6 October 2019.

Was Editor of ATMAN, a Biannual News Bulletin of the Gauhati High Court, from October 2018 to 14 October 2019.

Was the Secretary General of the Gauhati High Court Bar Association for the period 2000-2001.

Represented Assam in Ranji Trophy. Also represented East Zone in Under-19, Under-22 and at the senior level.

=== As Chief Justice ===
He was appointed as Chief Justice of Sikkim High Court and sworn in on 15 October 2019. Hon’ble Governor Shri Ganga Prasad administered him the oath at the lawn of New Raj Bhawan. The post of Chief Justice of High Court of Sikkim had fallen vacant after the superannuation of Justice Vijay Kumar Bist on 16 September 2019.

The swearing-in ceremony was attended by Hon’ble Chief Minister P. S. Tamang (Golay), Hon’ble Justice Meenakshi Madan Rai, Hon’ble Justice Bhaskar Raj Pradhan, Hon’ble Cabinet Ministers, Hon’ble Member of Lok Sabha, Indra Hang Subba, Hon’ble Members of Sikkim Legislative Assembly, Registrar General, Chief Secretary of Sikkim, Additional Chief Secretaries, Additional Registrar General, Senior government officers, Advisors to Government of Sikkim, Law fraternity members of High Court of Sikkim and Sikkim State Legal Service Authority and host of dignitaries.

In December 2020, Chief Justices of Andhra Pradesh and Sikkim High Courts were swapped and subsequently Justice Goswami was sent to head Andhra Pradesh High Court while the then Chief Justice of Andhra Pradesh Jitendra Kumar Maheshwari was sent to Sikkim High Court. He was transferred as Chief Justice of Andhra Pradesh High Court on 31 December 2020 and took oath on 6 January 2021.

He was again transferred as Chief Justice of Chhattisgarh High Court on 9 October 2021 and took oath on 12 October 2021 and served there till his superannuation on 10 March 2023.

== Post-retirement ==
He was appointed as Chairman of Assam Human Rights Commission in August 2023.
