= Arun Bhansali =

50th Chief Justice of The High Court of Judicature at Allahabad

The Hon. The Chief Justice Arun Bhansali
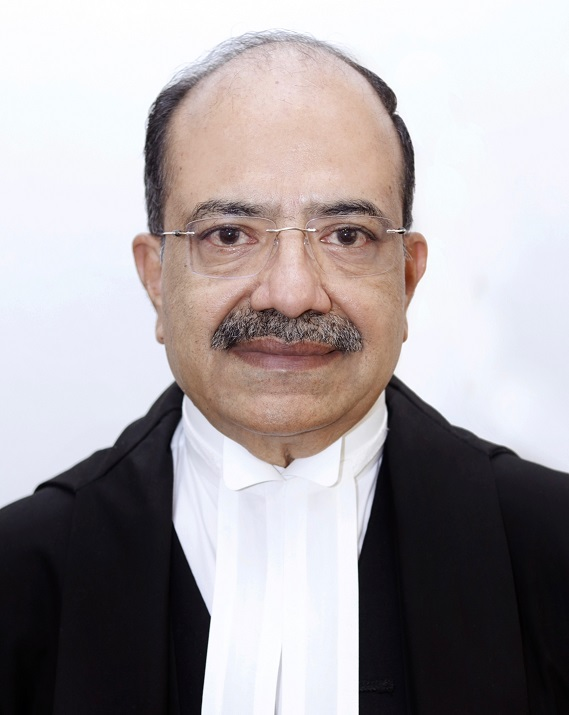

51st Chief Justice of Allahabad High Court
- Incumbent
- Assumed office 5 February 2024
- Nominated by: D. Y. Chandrachud
- Appointed by: Droupadi Murmu
- Preceded by: Pritinker Diwaker

Judge of Rajasthan High Court
- In office 8 January 2013 – 4 February 2024
- Nominated by: Altamas Kabir
- Appointed by: Pranab Mukherjee

Personal details
- Born: 15 October 1967 (age 58)
- Education: University of Rajasthan

Arun Bhansali (born 15 October 1967) is an Indian judge serving as the Chief Justice of Allahabad High Court since 5 February 2024. He is also the Member of Advisory - cum - Consultative panel for National Legal Service Authority (NALSA) and a Member of National Court Management System Committee (NCMSC).

== Career ==
After completing his LLB and enrolling as a lawyer in 1989, Bhansali worked in various legal domains. Prior to being a judge, he worked at the Rajasthan High Court in Jodhpur, in diverse legal areas, ranging from taxes and corporate law to civil and constitutional matters. Bhansali's legal expertise was also sought by numerous corporate entities and governmental bodies. He was retained by organisation such as the Nuclear Power Corporation of India Ltd., companies and trusts related to erstwhile Royal Family of Udaipur (1996–2013), and was Standing Counsel for Hindustan Petroleum Corporation Ltd. (2004–2013), Standing Counsel for Income Tax Department (2012–2013), HPCL – Mittal Energy Ltd and Panel Lawyer for Bank of Baroda, Canara Bank, Central Bank of India and Vijaya Bank. He was also involved in public service, including as a standing counsel for government departments and agencies.

Bhansali was named judge of the Rajasthan High Court on 8 January 2013.

In 2024, he was appointed as the chief justice of Allahabad High Court.

== Notable judgements ==
=== Om Kanwar v. State of Rajasthan ===
An appeal against conviction for offence under Section 302 IPC and sentenced for life imprisonment with a fine of Rs. 20,000/- with default stipulation to undergo six months' additional simple imprisonment. A division bench consisting of Arun Bhansali and Rajendra Prakash Soni, JJ., after appreciation of evidence, oral as well as documentary, and the circumstances of the case and conduct of the accused in not offering any explanation for the homicidal death of her five-month-old child, held the trial court has rightly convicted the appellant under Section 302 IPC.

=== Sharmila Barma v. State of Rajasthan ===
While allowing a petition challenging the cancellation of the petitioner's candidature for the post of Teacher Grade III (Level I), A single-judge bench consisting of Bhansali quashed the determination made by respondents and held that since Association of Indian Universities (AIU) had issued an equivalence certificate with regard to the qualification of the petitioner, the same made her eligible for the post.

=== Priyanka Shrimali v. State of Rajasthan ===
A writ petition challenging the position of law prior to the amendment of Rule 2(c) of Rajasthan Compassionate Appointment of Dependents of Deceased Government Servant Rules, 1996, which excluded the married daughter from the definition of 'dependent', for the purpose of compassionate appointment vide Notification dated 28 October 2021, a three judge bench (of Sandeep Mehta, Vijay Bishnoi and Bhansali) held that the provision of Rule 2(c) of Rajasthan Compassionate Appointment of Dependents of Deceased Government Servant Rules, 1996, which exclude the married daughter from definition of dependent prior to its amendment vide notification dated 28.10.2021, is discriminatory and violative of Articles 14 to 16 of the Constitution of India and as such, the word 'unmarried' from the definition of 'dependent', is struck down.

Further, in Rule 5 of Rajasthan Compassionate Appointment of Dependents of Deceased Government Servant Rules, 1996 also the word unmarried daughters/adopted unmarried daughter, shall be read as daughters/adopted daughter. "Marriage does not determine the continuance of the relationship of a child, whether a son or a daughter, with the parents. A son continues to be a son both before and after marriage. A daughter continues to be a daughter. This relationship is not affected either in fact or in law upon marriage. Marriage does not bring about a severance of the relationship between a father and mother and their son or between parents and their daughter. Our society is governed by constitutional principles. Marriage cannot be regarded as a justifiable ground to define and exclude from who constitutes a member of the family when the state has adopted a social welfare policy which is grounded on dependency."

=== Ganpat Singh Medawat v. State of Rajasthan ===
While disposing of a writ petition filed by the petitioner requesting to make pay fixation of the petitioner equal to similarly situated teachers, a single-judge bench consisting of Arun Bhansali,* J., directed the State to consider representations of petitioners for providing equal pay to similar positioned teachers. The Court reiterated the direction of the Jaipur Bench, "In case, a representation is so addressed within the aforesaid period, the State-respondents are directed to consider and decide the same by a reasoned and speaking order as expeditiously as possible in accordance with law. However, in no case later than three months from the date of receipt of the representation along with a certified copy of this order."
