= Ajay Kumar Tripathi =

Indian judge (1957–2020)

Hon'ble Justice Ajay Kumar Tripathi
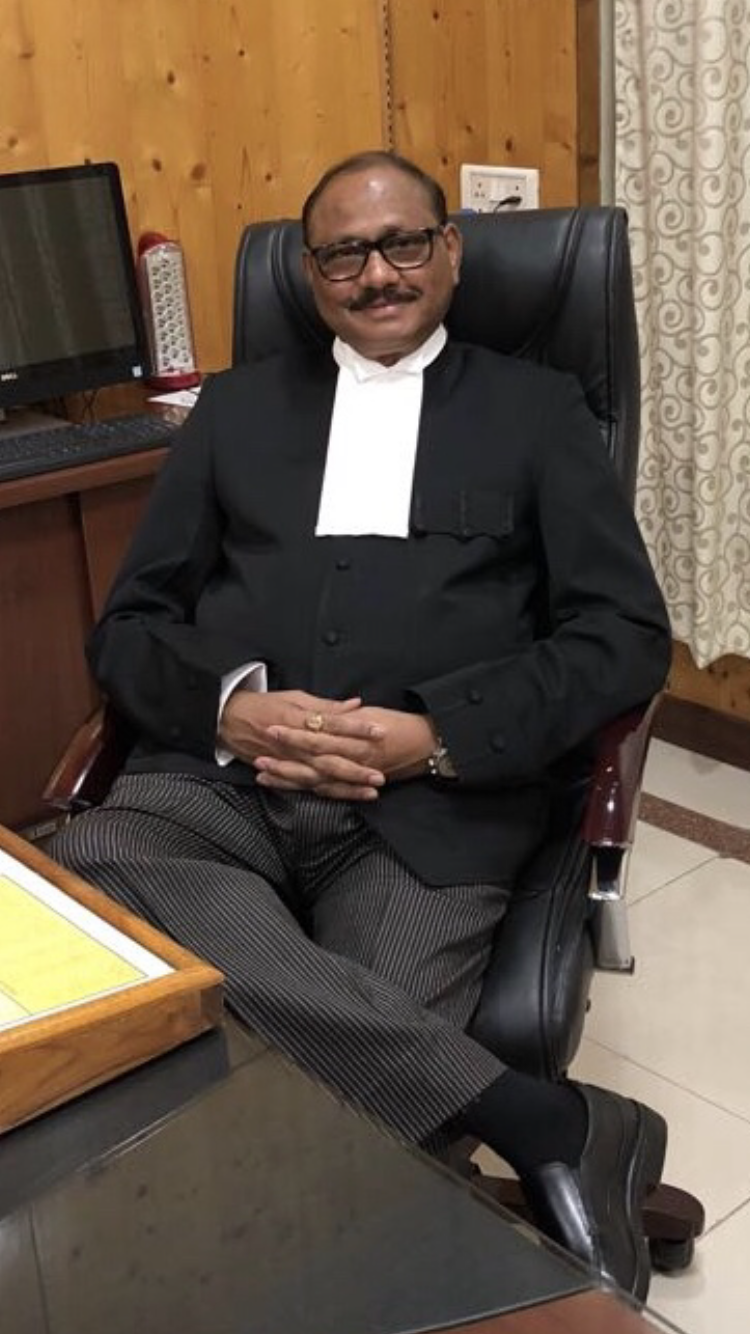

Judicial Member of Lokpal
- In office 27 March 2019 – 2 May 2020
- Appointed by: Ram Nath Kovind
- Chairman: Pinaki Chandra Ghose

12th Chief Justice of Chhattisgarh High Court
- In office 7 July 2018 – 26 March 2019
- Nominated by: Dipak Misra
- Appointed by: Ram Nath Kovind
- Preceded by: T. B. Radhakrishnan
- Succeeded by: P. R. Ramachandra Menon; P. K. Mishra (acting)

Judge of Patna High Court
- In office 21 November 2007 – 6 July 2018
- Nominated by: K. G. Balakrishnan
- Appointed by: Pratibha Patil

Personal details
- Born: 12 November 1957 Patna, Bihar
- Died: 2 May 2020 (aged 62) AIIMS, New Delhi, India
- Cause of death: COVID-19; Heart Attack
- Relations: Bindeshwari Dubey (grand father-in-law)
- Education: Shri Ram College of Commerce, Delhi University

Justice Ajay Kumar Tripathi (12 November 1957 – 2 May 2020) was an Indian jurist who served as the Chief Justice of the Chhattisgarh High Court and later as a Judicial Member of the Lokpal of India.

== Education and career ==
Tripathi was born on 12 November 1957. He is the grandson of Late Shri Paramanand Tripathi (labour leader of Bokaro) and grandson-in-law of Late Bindeshwari Dubey (former Chief Minister of undivided Bihar). He completed his schooling from St. Xavier's School, Bokaro Steel Cityand completed his graduation in Economics (Honours) from Shri Ram College of Commerce, Delhi in 1978. He subsequently studied law at the Campus Law Centre, University of Delhi. At Campus Law Centre, he also served as the Joint Secretary of Delhi Law Faculty Students' Union in 1978-1979.

After enrolling as an advocate with the Bar Council of Bihar in 1981, he practised primarily at the Patna High Court, specialising in constitutional law, taxation, service law and commercial litigation. He served as Standing Counsel for the Union Government and the Income Tax Department. He also appeared on behalf of the Central Bureau of Investigation and the Comptroller and Auditor General of India and also represented the Customs and Excise Department, Enforcement Directorate, Regional Provident Fund Commissioner and many Public Sector Undertakings including Bharat Sanchar Nigam Limited, Bharat Petroleum Corporation Limited, Inland Waterways Authority of India amongst others. He appeared in the Fodder Scam cases, alleging abuse of office by former Chief Minister of Bihar. He also served as an Additional Advocate General for the State of Bihar, and represented the State before the Patna High Court in its litigations.

== Judicial career ==
Tripathi was appointed an Additional Judge of the Patna High Court on 9 October 2006 and became a permanent judge on 21 November 2007. During his tenure at the Patna High Court, he also served as the Executive Chairman of the Bihar State Legal Services Authority (BSLSA), Patna. He contributed to varied events organised by the BSLSA, as its Executive Chairman. In 2014, SRCC awarded Tripathi with the "Distinguished Alumni Award" to commemorate his professional achievements.

He was appointed as the Chief Justice of Chhattisgarh High Court from 7 July 2018 succeeding T. B. Radhakrishnan, who was transferred to Telangana High Court. During his tenure as Chief Justice, he was the Patron-in-Chief of the Chhattisgarh State Judicial Academy (CSJA). He played an instrumental role in the inauguration of the new building of the CSJA in 2018.

On 23 March 2019, Tripathi resigned as Chief Justice of Chhattisgarh High Court after being appointed as Judicial Member in the anti-corruption ombudsman, Lokpal of India. On 27 March 2019, he took oath as a Judicial Member of the Lokpal of India.

In 2019, he was honoured by the Patna High Court Association for his appointment as a Judicial Member in the first Lokpal of India.

== Contribution to Legal Education ==
Justice Tripathi was a member of the General and Academic Councils of Chanakya National Law University (CNLU) at Patna. He also served as a member of the Academic Council of the National Law School of India University (NLSIU), Bangalore. He was a Special Invitee to the Education Committee, Bar Council of India.

During his tenure as the Chief Justice of Hon'ble Chhattisgarh High Court, Justice Tripathi served as the Chancellor of the Hidayatullah National Law University (HNLU), Raipur.

== Personal life ==
Justice Tripathi was an ardent golfer. He served as the President of Patna Golf Club between the years 2007-2009. Justice Tripathi, both participated and won many amateur tournaments. On invitation from the Governor of Jammu & Kashmir, Justice Tripathi led Bihar in inter-state golf tournaments at the Royal Springs Golf Club of Jammu & Kashmir.

He is survived by his wife and three daughters.

== Death ==
In April 2020, Justice Tripathi contracted COVID-19 during the first wave of the COVID-19 pandemic in India and was placed on a ventilator in critical condition. He died on 2 May 2020, from a cardiac arrest at the AIIMS Trauma Centre.

== Legacy ==
On 22 August 2022, the Justice Ajay Kumar Tripathi Foundation was founded in the memory of Justice Ajay Kumar Tripathi. The Foundation, a non-profit organization, aims to promote legal thought and discourse towards judicial education and legal reform. The Foundation was inaugurated on 27 November 2022, at the India International Centre, New Delhi. The occasion was also marked by the 1st Justice Ajay Kumar Tripathi Memorial Lecture.

The "Justice Ajay Kumar Tripathi Memorial Under-19 Trophy Cricket Championship" has been launched as of 2022.
