= Goutam =

- Goutam Bhaduri Indian judge
- Goutam Halder Indian theatre actor
