= Sanjeev Prakash Sharma =

Indian judge (born 1964)

Hon'ble Justice Sanjeev Prakash Sharma
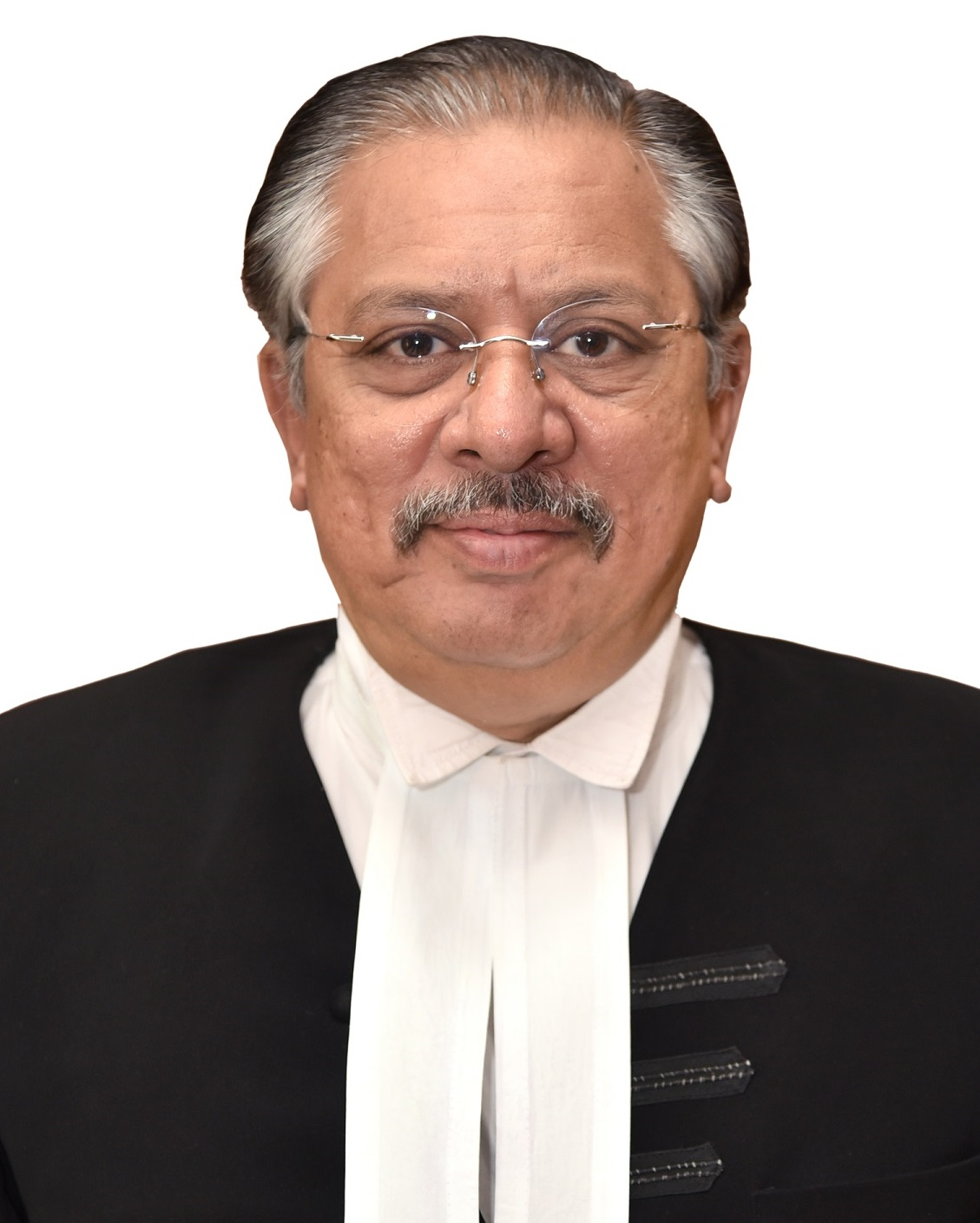

Judge of Rajasthan High Court
- In office 17 July 2025 – 26 September 2026
- Nominated by: B. R. Gavai
- Appointed by: Droupadi Murmu
- Acting Chief Justice
- In office 28 September 2025 – 6 September 2026
- Appointed by: Droupadi Murmu
- Preceded by: K. R. Shriram
- Succeeded by: S. K. Agrawal

Judge of Punjab & Haryana High Court
- In office 8 May 2023 – 17 July 2025
- Nominated by: D. Y. Chandrachud
- Appointed by: Droupadi Murmu

Judge of Patna High Court
- In office 1 January 2022 – 8 May 2023
- Nominated by: N. V. Ramana
- Appointed by: Ram Nath Kovind

Judge of Rajasthan High Court
- In office 16 November 2016 – 31 December 2021
- Nominated by: T. S. Thakur
- Appointed by: Pranab Mukherjee

Personal details
- Born: 27 September 1964 (age 62) Jaipur, Rajasthan
- Education: B.Sc and LL.B from Rajasthan University

Sanjeev Prakash Sharma (born 27 September 1964) is a retired Indian judge who had served as the judge in the High Courts of Rajasthan, Patna, and Punjab and Haryana. He is particularly notable for his almost year long tenure as acting chief justice of the Rajasthan High Court, which ended with controversy surrounding misuse of powers.

== Life and career ==
Sharma was born on 27 September 1964 in Jaipur, Rajasthan, his early foundations were established in his hometown. He pursued his initial higher education in the sciences, earning a Bachelor of Science (B.Sc.) degree. Driven by an interest in the legal system, he subsequently enrolled at the University of Rajasthan, where he successfully graduated with a Bachelor of Laws (LL.B.) degree.

Sharma formally initiated his legal career upon enrolling as an advocate on 30 May 1987. For nearly three decades, he maintained an extensive and highly diverse independent litigation practice primarily centered at the Rajasthan High Court. Over the course of his career at the Bar, he developed substantial expertise across a wide range of legal domains, including Constitutional law, service and labour matters, commercial litigation, criminal defense, and arbitration disputes. His deep legal acumen and extensive experience eventually led to his elevation to the bench from the lawyer quota, being appointed as a Judge of the Rajasthan High Court on 16 November 2016.

His judicial career spans multiple jurisdictions due to a series of strategic administrative transfers. On 1 January 2022, he was transferred to the Patna High Court. He served there until 8 May 2023, when he was transferred to the Punjab and Haryana High Court in Chandigarh. This particular relocation was granted primarily on health grounds to ensure access to specialized medical infrastructure. Following a resolution by the Supreme Court Collegium in May 2025, he returned to his parent High Court in Rajasthan, assuming office on 17 July 2025. Upon the retirement of Chief Justice K.R. Shriram, the Union Law Ministry officially appointed Justice Sharma as the Acting Chief Justice of the Rajasthan High Court, a prestigious administrative charge he formally assumed on his birthday on 27 September 2025 and held it till 6 September 2026 when Sanjay Kumar Agrawal was appointed as permanent chief justice.

== Controversy ==
Sharma became the subject of intense national scrutiny in August 2026 following explosive whistleblowing letters sent by Supreme Court Judge Justice Sandeep Mehta to Chief Justice of India Surya Kant. The correspondence detailed a "grim and disturbing scenario" under Justice Sharma's ten-month tenure as Acting Chief Justice of the Rajasthan High Court, levelling serious allegations of maladministration, favouritism, and the blatant abuse of administrative powers. Specifically, the letters flagged highly irregular roster manipulations—such as bypassing territorial rules to move land dispute appeals from Udaipur to a Jaipur bench headed by the Acting Chief Justice himself—alongside claims of nepotism regarding controversial high court elevation recommendations and the administrative targeting of a colleague's family.

The leaking of these institutional complaints triggered an immediate and volatile revolt within the legal community. Led by the Rajasthan High Court Advocates' Association, lawyers launched massive, coordinated protests and slogan-chanting demonstrations across both the Jodhpur and Jaipur benches, fiercely demanding that Justice Sharma be stripped of his administrative duties. The crisis reached a breaking point on 31 August 2026 when bar associations enforced a complete courtroom boycott, refusing to appear before his bench. This escalating paralysis forced the Supreme Court Collegium to step in on the same day, executing a tactical intervention to transfer Justice Sanjay Kumar Agrawal to Rajasthan to immediately seize administrative control. Faced with absolute institutional non-cooperation and the sudden deployment of an outside jurist, Justice Sharma opted out of judicial work entirely, going on leave from 1 September 2026 just weeks ahead of his scheduled constitutional retirement on 26 September 2026.
