= Sanjay Kumar Agrawal =

44th Chief Justice of Rajasthan High Court

The Honourable Chief Justice Sanjay Kumar Agrawal
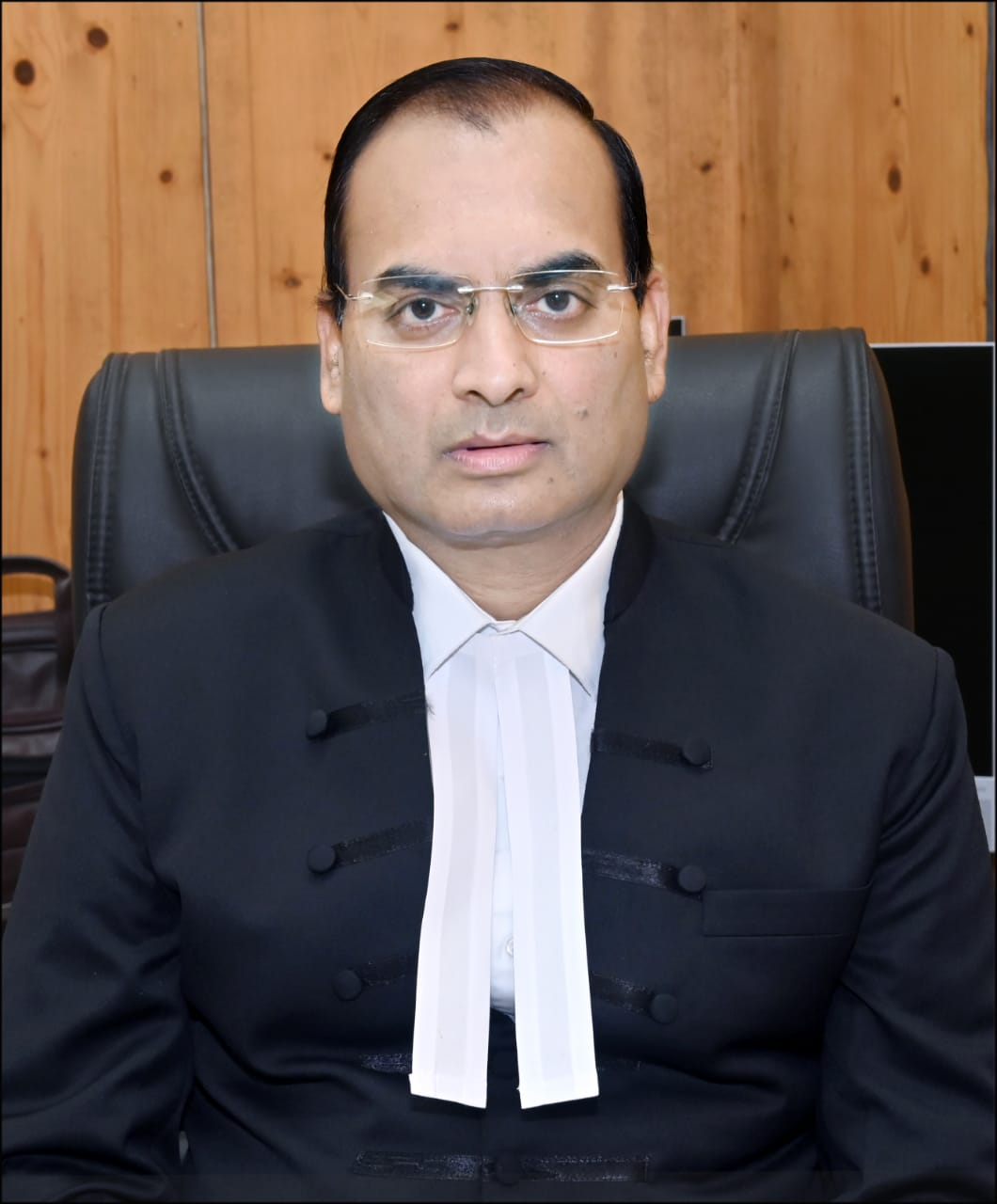

44th Chief Justice of Rajasthan High Court
- Incumbent
- Assumed office 7 September 2026
- Nominated by: Surya Kant
- Appointed by: Droupadi Murmu
- Preceded by: K. R. Shriram; S. P. Sharma (acting)

Judge of Chhattisgarh High Court
- In office 16 September 2013 – 6 September 2026
- Nominated by: P. Sathasivam
- Appointed by: Pranab Mukherjee
- Acting Chief Justice
- In office 5 September 2026 – 6 September 2026
- Appointed by: Droupadi Murmu
- Preceded by: Ramesh Sinha
- Succeeded by: K. R. Mohapatra

Advocate General of Chhattisgarh
- In office 25 June 2012 – 11 September 2013
- Appointed by: Shekhar Dutt
- Chief Minister: Raman Singh
- Preceded by: Deoraj Singh Surana
- Succeeded by: Jugal Kishore Gilda

Personal details
- Born: 15 July 1965 (age 61) Ratanpur, Chhattisgarh
- Education: Guru Ghasidas University (LL.B) and (B.Sc), Ravishankar Shukla University (LL.M)

Sanjay Kumar Agrawal (born 15 July 1965) is an Indian judge, who is currently serving as the Chief Justice of Rajasthan High Court from 7 September 2026. He was former judge of the Chhattisgarh High Court.

== Early life and education ==
Agrawal was born on 15 July 1965 in Ratanpur, Bilaspur, to Shri Virendra and Smt. Chameli Agrawal, his early life was rooted in the academic and cultural environment of undivided Madhya Pradesh (now part of Chhattisgarh). He completed his schooling in Ratanpur and went on to pursue higher education at Guru Ghasidas University in Bilaspur, where he earned his Bachelor of Science and subsequently his Bachelor of Laws (LL.B.) degree. Driven by a deep commitment to legal academic excellence, he later acquired a Master of Laws (LL.M.) from Pandit Ravishankar Shukla University in Raipur.

== Career ==
Agrawal officially enrolled as an Advocate on 3 January 1989, initiating what would become a highly successful career in law. He established a diverse practice that spanned across multiple judicial forums, including the District and Sessions Court at Bilaspur, the High Court of Madhya Pradesh at Jabalpur, and the High Court of Chhattisgarh following the state's formation in 2000. Over more than two decades as a practicing lawyer, he specialized profoundly in Civil and Constitutional matters. His sharp legal acumen made him a sought-after institutional counsel, and he notably represented critical public organs including the High Court of Chhattisgarh, the Chhattisgarh Public Service Commission, and the Chancellor of Indira Gandhi Agriculture University. Prior to his elevation to the bench, he achieved a pinnacle in his bar career by serving as the Advocate General of Chhattisgarh from 25 June 2012 to 11 September 2013.

His career on the bench formally commenced on 16 September 2013, when he was elevated as an Additional Judge of the High Court of Chhattisgarh. Demonstrating sharp legal jurisprudence, he was sworn in as a permanent judge of the same High Court on 8 March 2016, eventually rising to become the senior-most judge of the court right behind the Chief Justice. Beyond regular courtroom adjudications, Agrawal has held vital leadership responsibilities across major administrative and legal aid organs, notably serving as the Executive Chairman of the Chhattisgarh State Legal Services Authority (CGSLSA) and acting as an Ex-Officio Member of the Executive Council at the Hidayatullah National Law University (HNLU) in Raipur.

Due to his extensive judicial experience, the Supreme Court Collegium on 31 August 2026, recommended his elevation as the permanent Chief Justice of the Rajasthan High Court. Along with this recommendation, the Collegium issued a resolution for his immediate transfer from Chhattisgarh to Rajasthan. This strategic separation allowed the judiciary to deploy Justice Agrawal to Rajasthan immediately without waiting for the lengthier, time-consuming central government and presidential approvals required for a formal Chief Justice appointment. By installing an objective, outside jurist as the senior-most judge on the bench, the Supreme Court successfully neutralized the controversy centered on the Acting Chief Justice (ACJ) of the Rajasthan High Court, Justice Sanjeev Prakash Sharma, who had held full administrative control for over eleven months. Supreme Court judge Justice Sandeep Mehta had written a series of letters to Chief Justice of India Surya Kant, alleging rampant maladministration, favouritism, and the blatant misuse of administrative powers under the ACJ's protracted acting tenure. The situation escalated rapidly as the Rajasthan High Court Advocates' Association launched widespread strikes across both the Jodhpur and Jaipur benches, fiercely demanding that the ACJ be stripped of his powers and that a permanent Chief Justice from outside the state be brought in immediately to restore order.

He was sworn in as permanent chief justice of Rajasthan High Court on 7 September 2026 by Governor of Rajasthan, Haribhau Bagade.
