= Bibhu Datta Guru =

Indian judge

Bibhudatta Guru

Judge of Chhattisgarh High Court
- Incumbent
- Assumed office 13 August 2024

Bibhu Datta Guru is an Indian judge at the Chhattisgarh High Court. Guru was appointed as a judge of the Chhattisgarh High Court on 13 August 2024.
