= Chagari Praveen Kumar =

1st Acting Chief Justice of Andhra Pradesh High Court (2019)

Hon'ble Justice (Retd.) Chagari Praveen Kumar

Judge of Andhra Pradesh High Court
- In office 29 June 2012 – 25 February 2023
- Nominated by: S. H. Kapadia
- Appointed by: Pratibha Patil
- Acting Chief Justice
- In office 1 January 2019 – 6 October 2019
- Appointed by: Ramnath Kovind
- Preceded by: Position established
- Succeeded by: Jitendra Kumar Maheshwari

Personal details
- Born: 26 February 1961 (age 65) Hyderabad, India
- Education: Nizam College (B.Sc), Osmania University (LL.B)

Chagari Praveen Kumar (born 26 February 1961) is a highly respected Indian jurist and retired judge who made historical contributions to the Indian judiciary as the first Acting Chief Justice of the independent High Court of Andhra Pradesh.

== Early life and education ==
Born on 26 February 1961, in Hyderabad, Kumar was raised in an environment deeply rooted in the legal profession. He is the son of the late Chagari Padmanabha Reddy, who was widely celebrated as one of the most prominent criminal defense advocates in the history of undivided Andhra Pradesh. Kumar completed his formal schooling at the prestigious Little Flower High School in Hyderabad, followed by intermediate studies at Little Flower Junior College. He subsequently attended Nizam College, where he secured a Bachelor of Science (B.Sc.) degree, before transitioning to the University College of Law at Osmania University, where he obtained his professional law degree.

== Career ==
On 28 February 1986, Kumar formally enrolled as an advocate and joined his father’s established chambers, where he mastered criminal trial tactics and complex procedural laws. Within a short span, he built an extensive independent practice, regularly appearing before courts to argue severe criminal trials, white-collar offenses, and constitutional matters. After 26 years of highly successful practice at the Bar, he was elevated to the bench as an Additional Judge of the Andhra Pradesh High Court on 29 June 2012, and was later sworn in as a Permanent Judge on 4 December 2013, During the post-bifurcation transition period between 2014 and 2018, when a unified High Court in Hyderabad served both Telangana and Andhra Pradesh, he continued to manage a heavy roster of public interest litigations and appellate criminal matters.

The peak of his administrative career arrived on 1 January 2019, when a separate High Court for the state of Andhra Pradesh was officially instituted under a presidential directive. Being the senior-most judge allocated to the state, President Ram Nath Kovind appointed him under Article 223 of the Constitution of India to serve as the historic first Acting Chief Justice of the newly minted Andhra Pradesh High Court. Assuming administrative command alongside a founding team of 14 judges, Justice Kumar initially led early operations out of a temporary, makeshift court facility in Vijayawada. He worked directly with state planners to oversee the construction and launch of the Interim Judicial Complex at Amaravati, culminating in hosting Chief Justice of India Ranjan Gogoi on 3 February 2019, for the formal inauguration of the state's permanent judicial seat.

His leadership during this ten-month acting tenure was defined by setting up administrative systems from scratch, standardizing local registry protocols, and ensuring basic amenities for the institutional Bar before safely handing over the reins to the first permanent Chief Justice, Justice Jitendra Kumar Maheshwari, on 7 October 2019. Following his administrative stint, he returned to serving as the senior-most companion judge of the High Court, continuing to clear a backlog of long-pending litigations. Justice Chagari Praveen Kumar officially retired from active service upon reaching the mandatory superannuation age of 62 on 25 February 2023. During his official full-court farewell assembly, the bench and Bar praised him as a profound institutional role model whose unparalleled patience on the bench and foundational administrative contributions preserved public confidence during a volatile time of geopolitical division.
