= Lanusungkum Jamir =

Indian judge (born 1964)

Hon'ble Justice Lanusungkum Jamir

Judge of Calcutta High Court
- In office 22 July 2025 – 28 February 2026
- Nominated by: B. R. Gavai
- Appointed by: Droupadi Murmu

Judge of Gauhati High Court
- In office 10 June 2022 – 21 July 2025
- Nominated by: N. V. Ramana
- Appointed by: Ram Nath Kovind
- Acting Chief Justice
- In office 30 May 2025 – 20 July 2025
- Appointed by: Droupadi Murmu
- Preceded by: Vijay Bishnoi
- Succeeded by: Ashutosh Kumar
- In office 9 November 2023 – 4 February 2024
- Appointed by: Droupadi Murmu
- Preceded by: Sandeep Mehta
- Succeeded by: Vijay Bishnoi

Judge of Manipur High Court
- In office 9 October 2018 – 9 June 2022
- Nominated by: Dipak Misra
- Appointed by: Ram Nath Kovind

Judge of Gauhati High Court
- In office 22 May 2013 – 8 October 2018
- Nominated by: Altamas Kabir
- Appointed by: Pranab Mukherjee

Personal details
- Born: March 1, 1964 (age 62) Impuh, Makokchung District, Nagaland
- Education: B.A in History (Hons), L.L.B
- Alma mater: North Eastern Hill University

Lanusungkum Jamir (born 1 March 1964) is a retired Indian judge, who served as judge in the high courts of the Calcutta, Gauhati, Manipur. He also served as Acting Chief Justice twice in Gauhati High Court.

== Early life and career ==
Justice Jamir was born on 1 March 1964. He did his LLB from the North Eastern Hill University in 1988. He enrolled with the Bar Council of Assam, Nagaland, Meghalaya, Manipur and Tripura in 1989. He was appointed as Additional Advocate General of Nagaland in March 2009 and continued as such till his elevation as Additional Judge of the Gauhati High Court on 22 May 2013.

He was transferred as Additional Judge to Manipur High Court and took oath as 9 October 2018 where he was confirmed as permanent judge on 12 November 2018. He was retransferred to Gauhati High Court and took oath on 10 June 2022.

He has served twice as Acting Chief Justice of Gauhati High Court consequent upon the elevation of the then Chief Justices Sandeep Mehta and Vijay Bishnoi to Supreme Court of India respectively.

He was transferred to Calcutta High Court on 22 July 2025 and retired on 28 February 2026.
