= T. B. Radhakrishnan =

41st Chief Justice of Calcutta High Court

Hon'ble Chief Justice T. B. Radhakrishnan
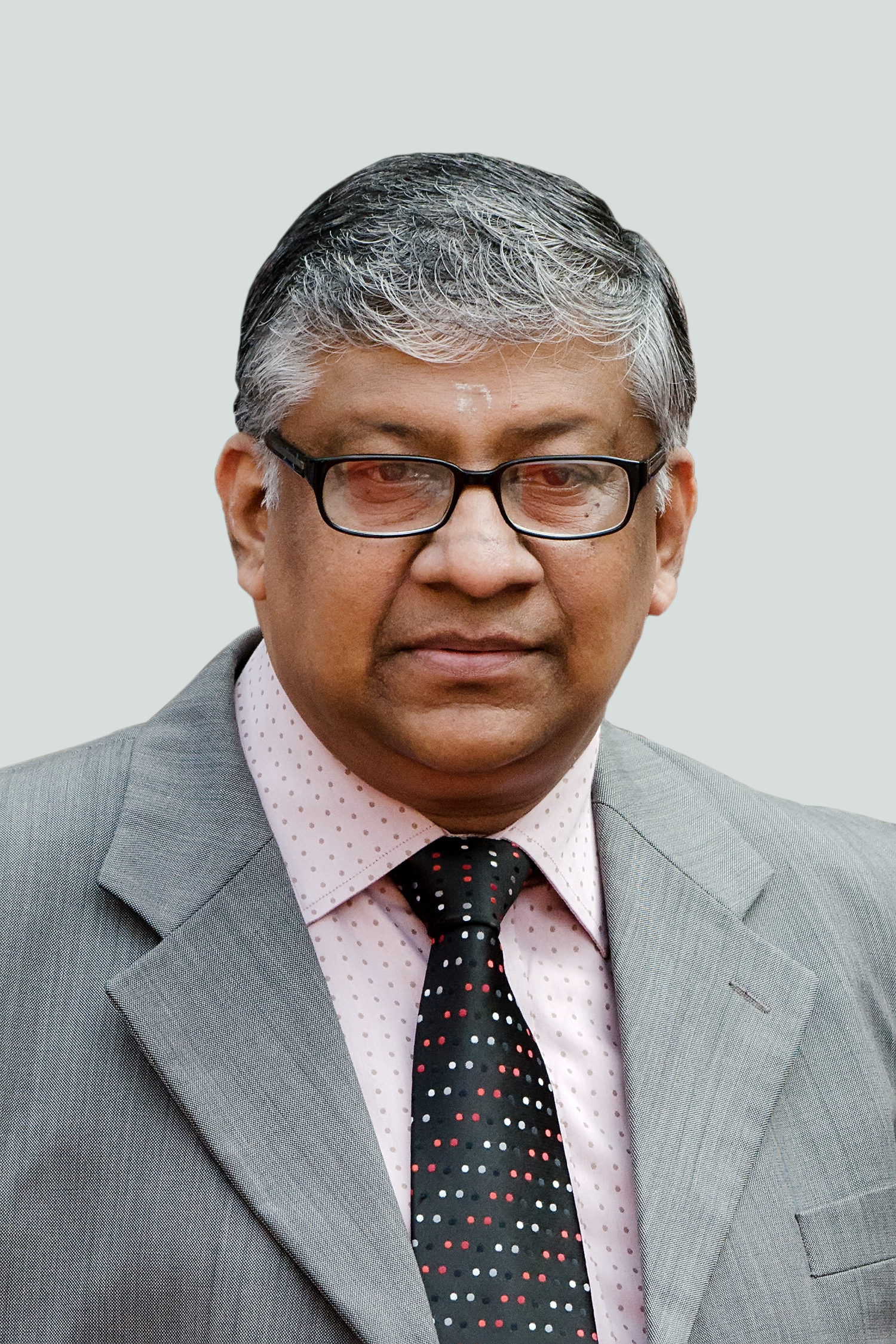

41st Chief Justice of Calcutta High Court
- In office 4 April 2019 – 28 April 2021
- Nominated by: Ranjan Gogoi
- Appointed by: Ram Nath Kovind
- Preceded by: Debasish Kar Gupta; Biswanath Somadder (acting)
- Succeeded by: Prakash Shrivastava; Rajesh Bindal (acting)

1st Chief Justice of Telangana High Court
- In office 1 January 2019 – 3 April 2019
- Nominated by: Ranjan Gogoi
- Appointed by: Ram Nath Kovind
- Preceded by: Position established
- Succeeded by: R. S. Chauhan

Chief Justice of Hyderabad High Court
- In office 7 July 2018 – 31 December 2018
- Nominated by: Dipak Misra
- Appointed by: Ram Nath Kovind
- Preceded by: K. J. Sengupta; D. B. Bhosale (acting); R. Ranganathan (acting)
- Succeeded by: Position abolished

11th Chief Justice of Chhattisgarh High Court
- In office 18 March 2017 – 6 July 2018
- Nominated by: J. S. Khehar
- Appointed by: Ram Nath Kovind
- Preceded by: Deepak Gupta; Pritinker Diwaker (acting)
- Succeeded by: Ajay Kumar Tripathi

Judge of Kerala High Court
- In office 14 October 2004 – 17 March 2017
- Nominated by: Ramesh Chandra Lahoti
- Appointed by: A. P. J. Abdul Kalam
- Acting Chief Justice
- In office 13 May 2016 – 31 July 2016
- Appointed by: Pranab Mukherjee
- Preceded by: Ashok Bhushan
- Succeeded by: Mohan Shantanagoudar
- In office 17 February 2017 – 18 March 2017
- Appointed by: Pranab Mukherjee
- Preceded by: Mohan Shantanagoudar
- Succeeded by: Navniti Prasad Singh

Personal details
- Born: 29 April 1959 Kollam, Kerala, India
- Died: 3 April 2023 (aged 63) Kochi, Kerala, India
- Spouse: Meera Sen
- Education: Fatima Mata National College (B.Sc), K. G. F. Law College (LL.B)

Thottathil Bhaskaran Nair Radhakrishnan (29 April 1959 – 3 April 2023) popularly known as T. B. Radhakrishnan, was an Indian jurist who served as Chief Justice of four High Courts namely Chhattisgarh, the common High Court of Hyderabad, Telangana and Calcutta.

== Early life and education ==
Radhakrishnan was born on 29 April 1959 in Kollam, Kerala, to N. Bhaskaran Nair and K. Parukutty Amma, both practising advocates at Kollam. He received his education at St. Joseph’s Convent and Government Boys High School in Kollam, Arya Central School in Thiruvananthapuram, and Trinity Lyceum in Kollam. He obtained a B.Sc. degree in Zoology from the University of Kerala, studying at Fatima Mata National College, Kollam, and subsequently earned his LL.B. degree from K.G.F. Law College, affiliated with Bangalore University.

== Career ==
Radhakrishnan enrolled as an advocate on 11 December 1983 and began practising in Thiruvananthapuram. In 1988, he shifted his practice to the Kerala High Court, focusing particularly on civil, constitutional, and administrative law. On 14 October 2004, Radhakrishnan was appointed a permanent judge of the Kerala High Court. During his tenure there, he held several institutional responsibilities, including serving as President of the Kerala Judicial Academy, Executive Chairman of the Kerala State Legal Services Authority and Chairman of the Law Reporting Council for the Indian Law Reports (Kerala Series). He also served twice as Acting Chief Justice of the Kerala High Court.

In March 2017, he was appointed Chief Justice of the Chhattisgarh High Court, assuming office on 18 March. In July 2018, he became Chief Justice of the common High Court of Hyderabad for the states of Telangana and Andhra Pradesh. Following the establishment of separate High Courts for the two states, he became the first Chief Justice of the Telangana High Court on 1 January 2019. In April 2019, he moved to the Calcutta High Court, taking oath as its Chief Justice on 7 April and served as such until his retirement on 28 April 2021.

== Personal life and death ==
Radhakrishnan died in Kochi on 3 April 2023, at the age of 63. He had been undergoing medical treatment in a private hospital. Radhakrishnan was survived by his wife, Meera Sen, and their children, Parvathy Nair and Keshavaraj Nair.
