= Jitendra Kumar Maheshwari =

Retired judge of Supreme Court of India (2021-2026)

Hon'ble Justice (Retd.) Jitendra Kumar Maheshwari
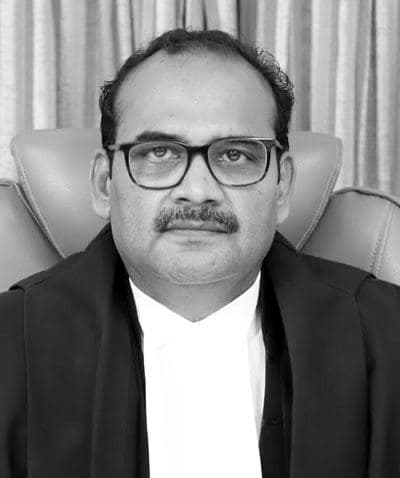

Judge of the Supreme Court of India
- In office 31 August 2021 – 28 June 2026
- Nominated by: N. V. Ramana
- Appointed by: Ram Nath Kovind

22nd Chief Justice of Sikkim High Court
- In office 6 January 2021 – 30 August 2021
- Nominated by: S. A. Bobde
- Appointed by: Ram Nath Kovind
- Preceded by: Arup Kumar Goswami
- Succeeded by: Biswanath Somadder; M. M. Rai (acting)

1st Chief Justice of Andhra Pradesh High Court
- In office 7 October 2019 – 5 January 2021
- Nominated by: Ranjan Gogoi
- Appointed by: Ram Nath Kovind
- Preceded by: Position established; C. P. Kumar (acting)
- Succeeded by: Arup Kumar Goswami

Judge of Madhya Pradesh High Court
- In office 25 November 2005 – 6 October 2019
- Nominated by: Y. K. Sabharwal
- Appointed by: A. P. J. Abdul Kalam

Personal details
- Born: 29 June 1961 (age 65) Joura, Madhya Pradesh, India
- Education: B.A., LL.B and LL.M
- Alma mater: Jiwaji University

Jitendra Kumar Maheshwari (born 29 June 1961) is an eminent Indian jurist and a retired judge of the Supreme Court of India, widely celebrated for his administrative acumen, deep integrity, and milestone contributions as the first Chief Justice of the newly bifurcated High Court of Andhra Pradesh.

== Early life and education ==
Maheshwari was born on 29 June 1961 in a small town named Joura of Morena District, Madhya Pradesh, he was raised in a modest, middle-class family with a rural background. He completed his formal education in Gwalior, graduating with a Bachelor of Arts (Hons.) in 1982. He subsequently attended Jiwaji University to pursue law, obtaining his LL.B. degree in 1985 and an LL.M. in 1991, later writing a doctoral thesis centered on medical malpractice in Madhya Pradesh.

== Career ==
Maheshwari began his professional legal journey on 22 November 1985, when he enrolled as an advocate with the State Bar Council of Madhya Pradesh. Over the next two decades, he established a diverse and highly successful practice, handling intricate legal disputes across civil, criminal, constitutional, tax, and service matters. His exceptional capability and respect among peers led to his election as a member of the Madhya Pradesh State Bar Council. His extensive experience from practicing across the Supreme Court and the Jabalpur and Gwalior benches of the state High Court paved the way for his transition to the bench. On 25 November 2005, he was appointed as an Additional Judge of the High Court of Madhya Pradesh and was made a permanent judge exactly three years later on 25 November 2008. During his tenure in Madhya Pradesh, he actively served on various critical institutional committees aimed at restructuring and optimizing court administration.

== As Chief Justice ==
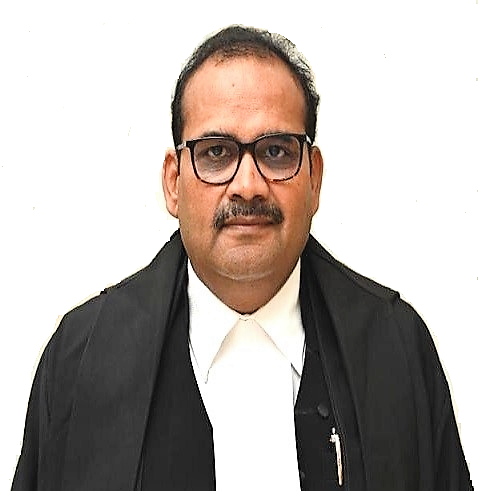
J. K. Maheshwari, 1st Chief Justice of Andhra Pradesh High Court

The most historic phase of his career unfolded in late 2019 following the bifurcation of Andhra Pradesh, which necessitated the creation of a separate judicial headquarters in Amaravati. Nominated by the Supreme Court Collegium, he was officially appointed by the President of India to serve as the first Chief Justice of the High Court of Andhra Pradesh, taking his oath of office on 7 October 2019. Despite taking charge of a newly established institution operating out of temporary infrastructure, Chief Justice Maheshwari led with immense structural efficiency. During a short, demanding tenure of just 15 months, he remarkably disposed of more than 4,500 pending cases while systematically streamlining the state’s nascent higher judiciary.

In January 2021, a judicial reshuffle by the Supreme Court Collegium led to his transfer as the Chief Justice of the High Court of Sikkim and he took oath of his office on 6 January 2021. Making history yet again, he became the first Chief Justice in the history of the Sikkim High Court to be elevated to the Supreme Court of India.

== As Supreme Court judge ==
During his tenure at the Supreme Court of India, Maheshwari left a lasting legacy through his prolific output, crisp drafting style, and participation in high-stakes constitutional matters. Elevated to the apex court on 31 August 2021, as part of a historic cohort of nine judges sworn in on a single day, he spent nearly five years shaping Indian jurisprudence before retiring on 28 June 2026. Over his tenure, he sat on 307 benches and authored 171 judgments, focusing heavily on resolving disputes in service law, criminal justice, and civil matters. His judicial philosophy favoured practical brevity over unnecessarily dense legalese, making his judgments highly accessible and legally precise.

A defining aspect of his time on the apex court was his involvement in landmark five-judge Constitution Benches that tackled deeply sensitive legal and social questions. Notably, he was part of the bench that dismissed the Union Government's curative petition seeking additional compensation for the victims of the Bhopal Gas Tragedy, ruling that a settlement could not be reopened decades later without evidence of fraud. He also contributed to the historic ruling that empowered the Supreme Court to directly grant divorces under Article 142 on the grounds of an "irretrievable breakdown of marriage," effectively bypassing the mandatory waiting periods mandated by traditional personal laws.

Beyond constitutional benches, Justice Maheshwari authored several impactful judgments that expanded social protections and enforced administrative accountability across the country. In a major ruling under the POSH Act, he progressive widened the definition of a "workplace," ensuring that a complainant could file a sexual harassment grievance through their own Internal Complaints Committee even if the accused worked for a completely different organization. In criminal law, he co-authored a vital ruling restricting the routine handover of state cases to the Central Bureau of Investigation (CBI), declaring that a CBI probe should remain an instrument of last resort to prevent overburdening the central agency. Furthermore, in cases concerning public service commissions and government recruitments, he consistently ruled against arbitrary policy changes, ensuring that official hiring criteria could not be altered mid-way through an active selection process.

In his final phase at the Supreme Court, Justice Maheshwari's seniority elevated him into the powerful five-member Supreme Court Collegium, giving him a direct role in recommending the appointment and transfer of higher judiciary judges across India. He was widely respected by both peers and advocates for his humble demeanor, deep administrative pragmatism, and his strict commitment to the institutional integrity of the courts. By the time he demitted office in June 2026, he had established himself as a remarkably disciplined judge who prioritized swift case disposal and unwavering adherence to statutory rules.
