= Rajesh Bindal =

Retired-Judge of the Supreme Court of India (born 1961)

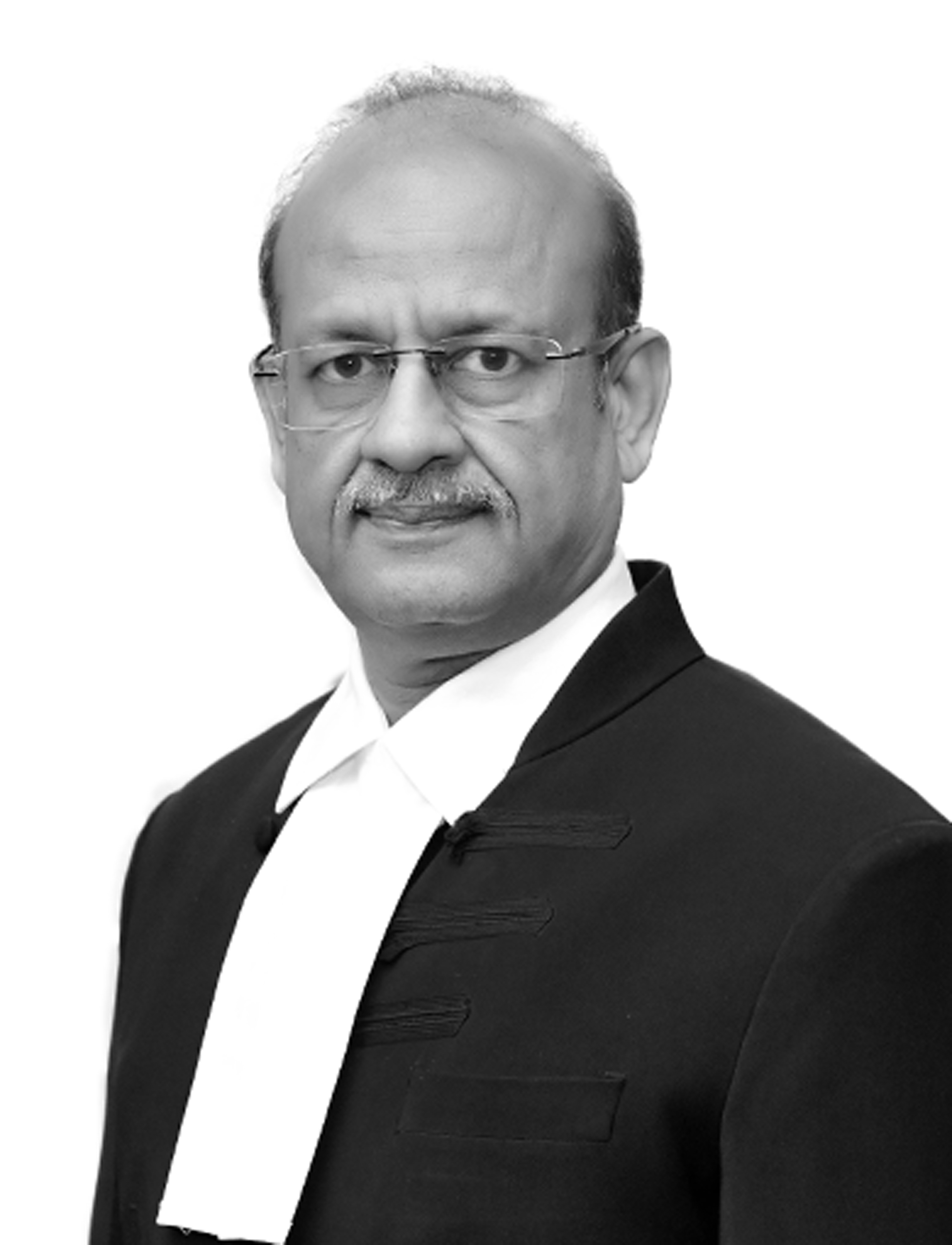

Judge of Supreme Court of India
- In office 13 February 2023 – 15 April 2026
- Nominated by: D. Y. Chandrachud
- Appointed by: Droupadi Murmu

49th Chief Justice of Allahabad High Court
- In office 11 October 2021 – 12 February 2023
- Nominated by: N. V. Ramana
- Appointed by: Ram Nath Kovind
- Preceded by: Sanjay Yadav; M. N. Bhandari (acting)
- Succeeded by: Pritinker Diwaker

Judge of Calcutta High Court
- In office 5 January 2021 – 10 October 2021
- Nominated by: S. A. Bobde
- Appointed by: Ram Nath Kovind
- Acting Chief Justice
- In office 29 April 2021 – 10 October 2021
- Appointed by: Ram Nath Kovind
- Preceded by: T. B. Radhakrishnan
- Succeeded by: Prakash Shrivastava

Judge of Jammu and Kashmir High Court
- In office 19 November 2018 – 4 January 2021
- Nominated by: Ranjan Gogoi
- Appointed by: Ram Nath Kovind
- Acting Chief Justice
- In office 9 December 2020 – 3 January 2021
- Appointed by: Ram Nath Kovind
- Preceded by: Gita Mittal
- Succeeded by: Pankaj Mithal

Judge of Punjab and Haryana High Court
- In office 22 March 2006 – 18 November 2018
- Nominated by: Y. K. Sabharwal
- Appointed by: A. P. J. Abdul Kalam

Personal details
- Born: 16 April 1961 (age 65) Ambala, Punjab, India (present-day Haryana)
- Education: LL.B
- Alma mater: Kurukshetra University

Rajesh Bindal (born 16 April 1961) is a retired judge of Supreme Court of India and a former chief justice of Allahabad High Court and current Chairperson of the National Company Law Appellate Tribunal. He has also earlier served as the acting chief justice of the Jammu and Kashmir High Court and the Calcutta High Court.

== Early life and career ==
He was born on 16 April 1961 at Ambala, Haryana. He did his LL.B. from Kurukshetra University in 1985 and started his legal practice at High Court of Punjab and Haryana in September 1985. He represented Income-tax Department, Haryana region and Employees Provident Fund Organization (Punjab & Haryana Regions) before the High Court and Central Administrative Tribunal.

He was appointed as judge of the Punjab and Haryana High Court on 22 March 2006. On 11 November, he was recommended for a transfer to the Jammu and Kashmir High Court, the common high court for the union territories of Ladakh and Jammu and Kashmir.

On 9 December 2020, Bindal was appointed by the President of India to serve as the acting chief justice of the Jammu and Kashmir High Court following the retirement of Gita Mittal. On 5 January 2021, following the elevation of Justice Pankaj Mithal as the Chief Justice of the Jammu and Kashmir High Court, Justice Bindal was transferred as a Judge to the Calcutta High Court. Following the retirement of T. B. Radhakrishnan, he was appointed by the president to serve as the acting Chief Justice of the Calcutta High Court on 29 April.

He was elevated as Chief Justice of Allahabad High Court on 9 October 2021 and took oath on 11 October 2021. In January 2023, supreme court collegium recommended his appointment to supreme court of India and government cleared his appointment in February. He sworn in as judge of Supreme Court of India on 13 February 2023. He retired from supreme court of India on 15 April 2026 after reaching at the age of 65, mandatory retirement age for supreme court judges in India.On 5 November 2026, he was appointed as the chairperson of National Company Law Appellate.

== Notable judgements ==
Bindal was on the two judge bench along with justice B.S. Walia which quashed the Punjab Scheduled Caste and Backward Classes (Reservation in Services) Act, 2006. The legislation granted 20% reservations in promotions for Scheduled Castes and Scheduled Tribes in C and D category government services and 14% in A and B category government services.
