= Ramesh Sinha =

15th Chief Justice of Chhattisgarh High Court (2023 - 2026)

Hon'ble Chief Justice (Retd.) Ramesh Sinha

15th Chief Justice of Chhattisgarh High Court
- In office 29 March 2023 – 4 September 2026
- Nominated by: D. Y. Chandrachud
- Appointed by: Droupadi Murmu
- Preceded by: A. K. Goswami; Goutam Bhaduri (acting)
- Succeeded by: K. R. Mohapatra; S. K. Agrawal (acting)

Judge of Allahabad High Court
- In office 21 November 2011 – 28 March 2023
- Nominated by: S. H. Kapadia
- Appointed by: Pratibha Patil

Personal details
- Born: 5 September 1964 (age 62) Allahabad, Uttar Pradesh
- Education: Allahabad University (B.A and LL.B)

Ramesh Sinha (born 5 September 1964) is an Indian jurist who has earlier served as the 5th Chief Justice of Chhattisgarh High Court. He is also a former judge of Allahabad High Court.

== Early life and education ==
Sinha was born on 5 September 1964, in Allahabad (now Prayagraj), Uttar Pradesh. Sinha was raised in an atmosphere deeply connected to the legal profession. His mother is Mrs. Kusum Sinha and his father was the late Shri T. N. Sinha, a prominent lawyer who was himself slated to take the oath of office as a Judge of the Allahabad High Court on 16 August 1990. Tragically, his father passed away just five days prior to the ceremony following a brief illness.

Sinha received his preliminary education at St. Joseph's School in Allahabad. Pursuing higher education in his hometown, he earned a Bachelor of Arts degree in 1985 and subsequently graduated with an LL.B. from Allahabad University in 1990.

== Career ==
Following his graduation, Sinha officially entered the legal profession by enrolling as an advocate on 8 September 1990. He established a robust practice at the High Court of Judicature at Allahabad, building a formidable reputation on both the civil and criminal sides. Throughout his twenty-one years as a practicing attorney, he navigated a vast range of legal areas, managing constitutional matters, public undertakings, corporate representation, and essential state civil proceedings. Recognizing his legal prowess and integrity, the Supreme Court collegium selected him from the Bar quota for a seat on the bench. He was appointed as an Additional Judge of the Allahabad High Court on 21 November 2011, and was later made a Permanent Judge on 6 August 2013.

Justice Sinha served the jurisdiction of Uttar Pradesh for over eleven years. On 18 January 2021, he shifted his base to the Lucknow Bench of the Allahabad High Court, eventually stepping into the role of Senior Judge at Lucknow on 20 October 2021. His tenure at the Allahabad High Court remains remarkable for its sheer volume of disposals, finalizing approximately 1,34,200 cases, making him one of the most prolific judges of the court.

On 9 February 2023, the Supreme Court Collegium, led by Chief Justice of India D. Y. Chandrachud, recommended his elevation to head the Chhattisgarh High Court. Following the official executive order from President Droupadi Murmu, he was appointed as the Chief Justice of the High Court of Chhattisgarh on 25 March 2023.

He took his official oath of office on 29 March 2023, administered by Governor Biswabhusan Harichandan at the Raj Bhawan in Raipur. He succeeded Justice Arup Kumar Goswami, who had retired earlier that month. In his ex-officio capacity, Chief Justice Sinha also oversees critical legal education initiatives in the state, serving as the Patron-in-Chief of the State Legal Services Authority and the Chancellor of the Hidayatullah National Law University (HNLU).

== Controversy ==
During a live streamed court proceeding on 7 May 2025, Chief Justice Sinha drew significant public attention when he used a profane expression out of frustration with administrative delays. While heading a division bench hearing a long-pending 2017 Public Interest Litigation (PIL) regarding the Bilaspur airport expansion, the Chief Justice became highly exasperated by the state government's repetitive requests for "feasibility reports" instead of taking concrete action. In a moment of intense irritation with the state counsel, he remarked, "If there is a will, there is a way. If you want to make a vicious circle out of it, f**k off!" Following the courtroom outburst, the Chhattisgarh High Court administration briefly removed the original live-stream video from its official YouTube channel, subsequently re-uploading an edited version that entirely deleted the unparliamentary language from the public archive.
