= Vijay Bishnoi =

Indian judge (born 1964)

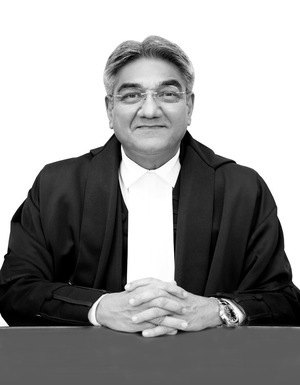

Judge of the Supreme Court of India
- Incumbent
- Assumed office 30 May 2025
- Nominated by: B. R. Gavai
- Appointed by: Droupadi Murmu

42nd Chief Justice of Gauhati High Court
- In office 5 February 2024 – 29 May 2025
- Nominated by: D. Y. Chandrachud
- Appointed by: Droupadi Murmu
- Preceded by: Sandeep Mehta; L. Jamir (acting)
- Succeeded by: Ashutosh Kumar; L. Jamir (acting)

Judge of the Rajasthan High Court
- In office 8 January 2013 – 4 February 2024
- Nominated by: Altamas Kabir
- Appointed by: Pranab Mukherjee

Personal details
- Born: 26 March 1964 (age 62) Jodhpur

Vijay Bishnoi (born 26 March 1964) is a judge of the Supreme Court of India. He previously served as the 42nd chief justice of Gauhati High Court from 2024 to 2025. He is a former judge of the Rajasthan High Court.

== Early life and career ==
Bishnoi was born on 26 March 1964 in Jodhpur. He enrolled as an advocate on 8 July 1989. He practiced at the Rajasthan High Court and the Central Administrative Tribunal at Jodhpur in wide range of areas such as civil, criminal, Constitutional, service, election cases etc. He served as Additional Central Govt. Standing Counsel during the years 2000 - 2004 ; as counsel for various Departments in the government of Rajasthan.

He was appointed as additional judge of the Rajasthan High Court on 8 January 2013 and was confirmed as a permanent judge of the Rajasthan High Court on 7 January 2015.

He was appointed as the Chief Justice of Gauhati High Court and took oath as the chief justice of Gauhati High Court on 5 February 2024.

On 26 May 2025, the Supreme Court collegium led by CJI Bhushan Ramkrishna Gavai recommended his appointment as judge of Supreme Court of India. This recommendation was cleared by central government and he was sworn in as Judge of Supreme Court on 30 May 2025.
