= Krushna Ram Mohapatra =

16th Chief Justice of Chhattisgarh High Court

The Honourable Chief Justice Krushna Ram Mohapatra

16th Chief Justice of Chhattisgarh High Court
- Incumbent
- Assumed office 7 September 2026
- Nominated by: Surya Kant
- Appointed by: Droupadi Murmu
- Preceding: Ramesh Sinha; S. K. Agrawal (acting)

Judge of Orissa High Court
- In office 17 April 2015 – 6 September 2026
- Nominated by: H. L. Dattu
- Appointed by: Pranab Mukherjee

Personal details
- Born: 18 April 1965 (age 61)
- Parent: Justice Sarat Chandra Mohapatra
- Education: B. A. and LL.B

Krushna Ram Mohapatra (born 18 April 1965) is an Indian jurist, who is currently currently serving as the judge Chief Justice of Chhattisgarh High Court since 7 September 2026. He is former judge of Orissa High Court.

== Life ==
Mohapatra was born on 18 April 1965, he is the son of the late Justice Sarat Chandra Mohapatra, who served as judge in Orissa High Court and Allahabad High Court. He pursued his education in law, successfully earning his Bachelor of Arts and Bachelor of Laws degrees to embark on a career in the legal field.

He officially began his legal practice after enrolling as an advocate with the Orissa State Bar Council on 7 February 1988. Over a career spanning more than twenty-six years, he established a diverse practice covering civil, criminal, service, and constitutional matters. During his time at the bar, he took on significant responsibilities, serving as the Additional Standing Counsel for the State of Odisha and the Odisha Public Service Commission. He also represented notable corporate and banking institutions, including the Bank of Baroda and Neelachal Ispat Nigam Limited.

His judicial career reached a major milestone when he was elevated to the bench as a Judge of the Orissa High Court on 17 April 2015. After over a decade of service as a senior judge in Odisha, In August 2026, the Supreme Court Collegium recommended his elevation to head Chhattisgarh state judiciary. The Central Government officially cleared his appointment on 5 September 2026, appointing him as the Chief Justice of the Chhattisgarh High Court and he took oath of office on 7 September 2026.
