= Rajeeve Gupta =

Film actor, critic and programmer

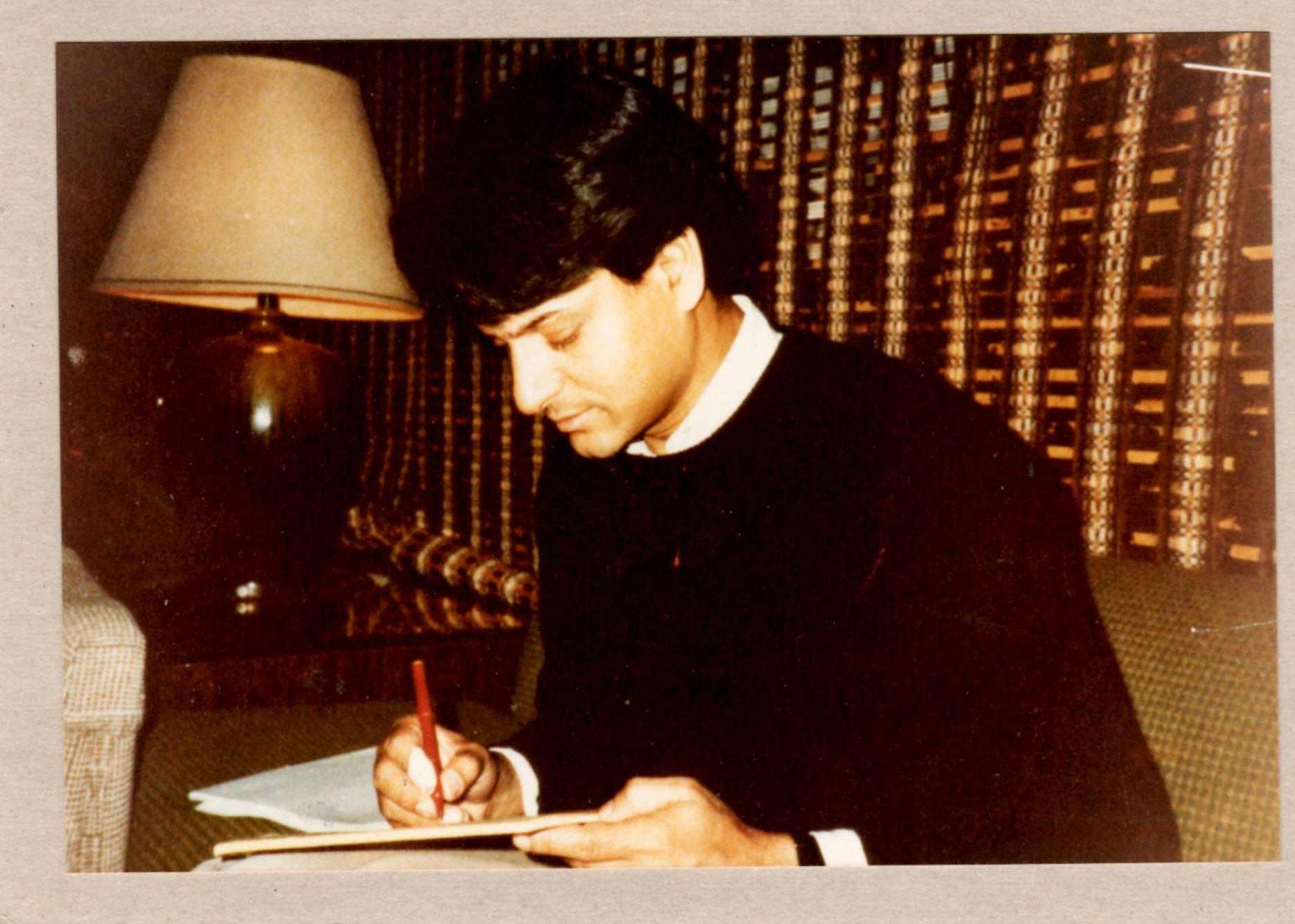
- Gupta in 1974
- Born: December 24, 1953; Calcutta, India
- Died: January 1, 1989 (aged 35); New York, New York, U.S.
- Occupations: Actor, Film Critic, Film Programmer

Rajeeve Gupta (December 24, 1953 – January 1, 1989) was a film actor, film critic and film programmer. He was born in Calcutta and died in New York. He matriculated to the University of Washington in 1970. He moved to New York City in 1982.

Gupta first worked as an actor in the film Pather Panchali when he was an infant. Gupta said he was chosen for the role because Satyajit Ray said he looked like "a particularly gruesome baby". Gupta also appeared as a student in the film Aparajito. In all, he appeared in six Satyajit Ray Films.

== Film critic ==
Gupta's first writing, 1968, was about Satyajit Ray, published in India. From 1971 to 1976, he was reviewer of films for the U.W. Daily News. Starting in 1976, he did film reviews on KOMO TV in Seattle.

== Film programmer ==
Gupta took over programming the A.S.U.W. Major Film Series, at the University of Washington in 1974. During his time there, he programmed the Seattle premiere of Louis Malle's Phantom of India, Peter Brook's King Lear, and Charle Chaplin's A King in New York. John Hartl, film critic for the Seattle Times, said "Four years ago, when "Phantom India" was offered to Seattle Theaters. It took sold out screenings at Gupta's A.S.U.W Major Film Series, to prove its commercial use. In 1979 it first appeared in a Seattle Theater, selling out shows at the Movie House, before it was moved to the larger Seven Gables Theater. The A.S.U.W Major Film Series continues to do some of the most innovative film programming around." A letter to the Seattle Times, from Richard T. Jameson (editor of The Movietone News, and later Film Comment) wrote:

"The A.S.U.W Major Film series is an invaluable feature of the local culture, and has been so only under the current management of Rajeeve Gupta. Previously the "Major Films" series was a bad joke. A melange of recent box office hits of negligible worth, and notable classics sabotaged by inapt/inept double billing. Gupta's programming has been innovative, diverse over all, imaginative, yet homogenous in its co-featuring. What is more startling - to a veteran of too many failed film series, is that he's managed to reach a big enough share of the colossally apathetic U. W. student body to sustain it economically."

== Seattle International Film Festival ==
Gupta was involved in the first Seattle International Film Festival, 1976, as an unpaid consultant. He was first a director, for the third festival in 1978. In which on the masthead he was listed as director with Dan Ireland and Darryl MacDonald listed co-owners and co-owners. Greg Kachel was listed as "consultant.

Gupta remained a director of the festival through 1983. The most shocking event of the festivals held at the Moore Egyptian Theatre, was on the last night of the third festival, with Werner Herzog in person with his film Heart of Glass. Before the screening of Heart of Glass, consultant Gred Kachel asked Dan Ireland, if he, Kachel, could introduce Herzog on stage to the audience. Ireland told him no, and that Gupta would be introducing Herzog to the audience. The lobby of the Moore Theatre was extra large. Kachel could see that Gupta was waiting around a corner from Herzog, with Herzog being unable to see Gupta. Kachel went to the concession stand. There he poured coca cola into a largest cup, he then walked to where Gupta stood and dumped the coca cola on him. He then left Gupta gasping in shock, and walked around the corner, where he led Herzog onstage, where he introduced him to the crowd. Dan Ireland was a director of the festival until 1986, when he moved to Hollywood to become a producer. In 1995 he made his first Hollywood motion picture as a director, "The Whole Wide World (1996)." In the credits of that film is a "Special Thanks" to Greg Kachel.

== Remembered ==
Each year, the Seattle International Film Festival gives a lifetime achievement award. The award is called a "Minky," a nickname for Gupta. "Minky" was chosen as an honor for him.

The 1989 Seattle International Film Festival was dedicated to Gupta.
