= Prashant Kumar Mishra =

Judge of the Supreme Court of India

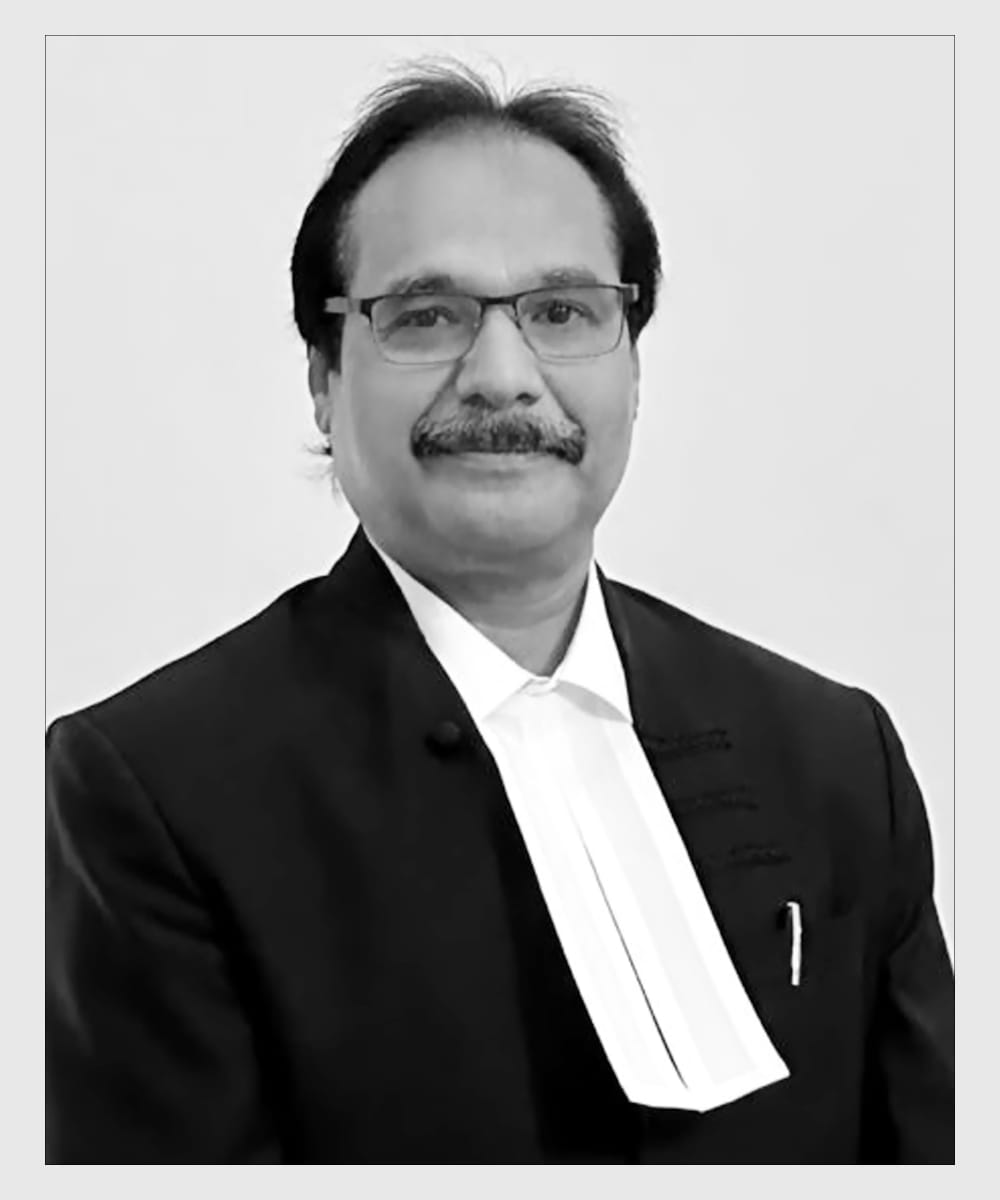

Judge of Supreme Court of India
- Incumbent
- Assumed office 19 May 2023
- Nominated by: D. Y. Chandrachud
- Appointed by: Droupadi Murmu

3rd Chief Justice of Andhra Pradesh High Court
- In office 13 October 2021 – 18 May 2023
- Nominated by: N. V. Ramana
- Appointed by: Ram Nath Kovind
- Preceded by: Arup Kumar Goswami
- Succeeded by: Dhiraj Singh Thakur; A. V. Sesha Sai (acting)

Judge of Chhattisgarh High Court
- In office 10 December 2009 – 12 October 2021
- Nominated by: K. G. Balakrishnan
- Appointed by: Pratibha Patil
- Acting Chief Justice
- In office 1 June 2021 – 11 October 2021
- Appointed by: Ram Nath Kovind
- Preceded by: P. R. Ramachandra Menon
- Succeeded by: Arup Kumar Goswami
- In office 27 March 2019 – 5 May 2019
- Appointed by: Ram Nath Kovind
- Preceded by: Ajay Kumar Tripathi
- Succeeded by: P. R. Ramachandra Menon

Advocate General of Chhattisgarh
- In office 1 September 2007 – 9 December 2009
- Appointed by: E. S. L. Narasimhan
- Chief Minister: Raman Singh
- Preceded by: Ravish Chandra Agrawal
- Succeeded by: Deoraj Singh Surana

Personal details
- Born: 29 August 1964 (age 61) Raigarh, Chhattisgarh
- Education: B.Sc and LL.B
- Alma mater: Guru Ghasidas Vishwavidyalaya

Prashant Kumar Mishra (born 29 August 1964) is a judge of the Supreme Court of India. He is former chief justice of the Andhra Pradesh High Court and acting chief justice of the Chhattisgarh High Court. He has also served as judge of the Chhattisgarh High Court. He also served as Advocate general of Chhattisgarh from 2007 to 2009. On 19 May 2023, he was elevated as judge of the Supreme Court of India.

== Early life ==
Prasanth Kumar Mishra was born on 29 August 1964 in Raigarh, Chhattisgarh. He took B.Sc. and LLB Degrees from Guru Ghasidas University at Bilaspur, Chhattisgarh.

== As advocate ==
He enrolled as an Advocate on 4 September 1987 and began his legal practice at the District Court of Raigarh. He then practised at High Court of Madhya Pradesh at Jabalpur and High Court of Chhattisgarh at Bilaspur. He dealt with Civil, Criminal and Writ branches of law. In 2005, he was designated as a Senior Advocate by the High Court of Chhattisgarh.

He had been Chairperson of the Chhattisgarh State Bar Council for two years. He was appointed Member of the Rule Making Committee of Chhattisgarh High Court. He was also an Ex-Officio Member in executive council of the Hidayatullah National Law University, Raipur and as well as Chancellor's nominee in executive council of Guru Ghasidas University, Bilaspur.

He has served as the Additional Advocate General for the State of Chhattisgarh from 26 June 2004. He served in this position for over 3 years until August 2007 and was appointed the Advocate General for the State on 1 September 2007.

== As judge ==
He was elevated as a Judge of Chhattisgarh High Court on 10 December 2009. He was appointed as the Acting Chief Justice of the Chhattisgarh High Court twice, Firstly on the resignation of the then Chief Justice Ajay Kumar Tripathi on 26 March 2019 and second time in June 2021 and later that year on 11 October, he was appointed the Chief Justice of the Andhra Pradesh High Court and assumed office 2 days later.

On 16 May 2023, the Supreme Court Collegium recommended his appointment as Judge of the Supreme Court of India. In its recommendation the SC focused on equal representation of different High Courts and factored in the under-representation of Chhattisgarh High Court (Justice Mishra's parent high court) in his recommendation.

The Collegium superseded Justice Pritinker Diwaker who is 3 years senior to Justice Mishra and hails from the Chhattisgarh High Court as well. The Collegium explained that having considered ‘all factors’ it found Justice Mishra ‘worthy of appointment as a judge of the Supreme Court’.
