= Ashutosh Kumar =

43rd Chief Justice of Gauhati High Court

Hon'ble Chief Justice Ashutosh Kumar

43rd Chief Justice of Gauhati High Court
- Incumbent
- Assumed office 21 July 2025
- Nominated by: B. R. Gavai
- Appointed by: Droupadi Murmu
- Preceded by: Vijay Bishnoi; L. Jamir (acting)

Judge of Patna High Court
- In office 25 November 2017 – 20 July 2025 (Acting CJ: 16 January 2025 – 20 July 2025)
- Nominated by: Dipak Misra
- Appointed by: Ram Nath Kovind
- In office 15 May 2014 – 6 January 2015
- Nominated by: Rajendra Mal Lodha
- Appointed by: Pranab Mukherjee

Judge of Delhi High Court
- In office 7 January 2015 – 24 November 2017
- Nominated by: H. L. Dattu
- Appointed by: Pranab Mukherjee

Personal details
- Born: 1 October 1966 (age 59)
- Education: L.L.B
- Alma mater: Delhi University

Ashutosh Kumar (born 1 October 1966) is an Indian judge serving as Chief Justice of Gauhati High Court. He is also a former judge of Delhi High Court and Patna High Court and served as Acting Chief Justice at the latter high court.

== Early life and career ==
Kumar was born on 1 October 1966. He did his schooling from St Michaels’ High School at Patna and graduated from St. Stephens’ College, Delhi University. He did his LLB. from Campus Law Centre, Delhi University.

He enrolled as an advocate on 9 July 1991 at Patna High Court. He has appeared in important criminal matters including matter related to convicts on Death Row. He was a Government Pleader for the State of Bihar for a short period. He has been appointed as an additional judge of Patna High Court on 15 May 2014 and was confirmed as permanent judge on 21 April 2016. He was transferred to Delhi High Court on 7 January 2015 and was repatriated again at Patna High Court on 24 November 2017.

On 26 May 2025 Supreme Court collegium led by CJI Bhushan Ramkrishna Gavai recommended him to be appointed as chief justice of Gauhati High Court and this recommendation was cleared by central government on 14 July 2025 and he subsequently took oath as chief justice on 21 July 2025.
