= Goutam Bhaduri =

Judge of Chhattisgarh High Court

Hon'ble Justice Goutam Bhaduri

Judge of Chhattisgarh High Court
- In office 16 September 2013 – 9 November 2024
- Nominated by: P. Sathasivam
- Appointed by: Pranab Mukherjee

Acting Chief Justice of Chhattisgarh High Court
- In office 11 March 2023 – 28 March 2023
- Appointed by: Droupadi Murmu
- Preceded by: Arup Goswami (permanent)
- Succeeded by: Ramesh Sinha (permanent)

Personal details
- Born: 10 November 1962 (age 63)
- Education: University of Delhi

Goutam Bhaduri (born 10 November 1962) is a retired Indian judge and a senior advocate practising at the Supreme Court of India.

Bhaduri was born on 10 November 1962 in the family of prominent lawyers S.K. Bhaduri (father) and P. Bhaduri (grandfather). He was elevated as judge of High Court of Chhattisgarh on 16 September 2013.
