= Pandit Ravishankar Shukla University =

State University in Chhattisgarh

Pandit Ravi Shankar Shukla University
- Motto: Agne Naya Supatha Raye (Lord lead us into the Virtuous Path)
- Type: Public
- Established: 1964; 62 years ago
- Accreditation: NAAC
- Affiliations: UGC
- Chancellor: Governor of Chhattisgarh
- Vice-Chancellor: Sachchidanand Shukla
- Faculty: >100
- Students: 5000+
- Location: Raipur, Chhattisgarh, India
- Campus: Urban
- Website: www.prsu.ac.in

Pandit Ravishankar Shukla University is an institution of higher education located in Raipur, Chhattisgarh, India. It is one of the largest and oldest institutions of higher education in Chhattisgarh. It is accrediated with an A+ by NAAC. It is a state university founded in 1964 by the Government of Madhya Pradesh. The university has a large campus in the western part of the capital of Raipur city.

== Affiliated colleges ==
Jurisdiction of RSU covers the entire central and southern part of Chhattisgarh. There are 180 educational institutions affiliated to the University.

== Departments ==
The university has several faculties that cover a variety of disciplines:

=== Arts ===
- School of Studies in Literature and Languages
- School of Studies in Library and Information Science
- Swami Vivekanand Memorial School of Studies in Comparative Religion, Philosophy and Yoga

=== Education ===
- Institute of Teachers Education

=== Information Technology ===
- School of Studies in Computer Science & IT

=== Management Studies ===
- Institute of Management

=== Sciences ===
- School of Studies in Chemistry
- School of Studies in Electronics and Photonics
- School of Studies in Environmental Science
- School of Studies in Geography
- School of Studies in Geology and Water Resource Management
- School of Studies in Mathematics
- School of Studies in Physics and Astrophysics
- School of Studies in Statistics
- Institute of Renewable Energy Technology & Management

=== Law ===
- School of Studies in Law

=== Life Sciences ===
- School of Studies in Anthropology
- School of Studies in Biotechnology
- School of Studies in Life Sciences

=== Physical Education ===
- School of Studies in Physical Education

=== Social Sciences ===
- Center for Woman Studies
- School of Studies in Ancient Indian History Culture & Tourism & Hotel Management
- School of Studies in Economics
- School of Studies in History
- School of Studies in Psychology
- Center for Regional Studies and Research

=== Technology ===
- University Institute of Pharmacy

=== Other ===
- Center for Basic Sciences

== History ==
Pt. Ravishankar Shukla University, Raipur, was established in 1964. It is named after Pt. Ravishankar Shukla, the first chief minister of Madhya Pradesh. The university came into being on 1 May and was functional from 1 June 1964 with 46 affiliated colleges, five university teaching departments (UTDs) and 34,000 students. Indira Gandhi, the then minister of Information & Broadcasting, inaugurated the university postgraduate department in five subjects on 2 July 1965. The number of students at the university and the number of disciplines offered have grown over the last 44 years.

== Rankings ==
University and college rankings

General – India
- NIRF (Universities) (2023): 151–200

Pharmacy – India
- NIRF (2023): 101-150

Pandit Ravishankar Shukla University was ranked in the 151–200 band among universities in India by National Institutional Ranking Framework (NIRF) in 2023 and 101-150 band in the pharmacy ranking.
