= Chhattisgarh High Court =

Subnational high court in India

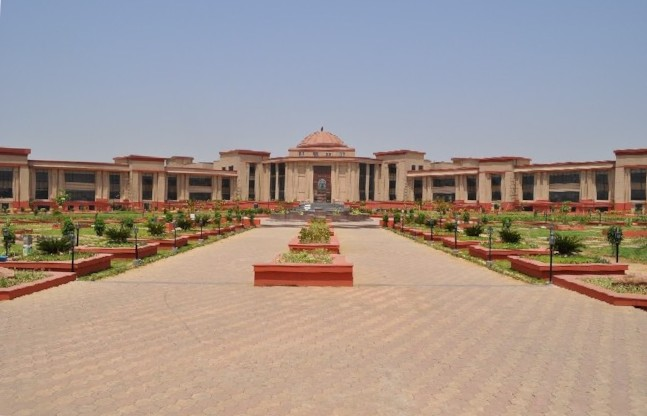
- Interactive map of Chhattisgarh High Court
- 22.0182°N 82.0969°E
- Established: 1 November 2000; 25 years ago
- Jurisdiction: Chhattisgarh
- Location: Bilaspur, Chhattisgarh
- Coordinates: 22.0182°N 82.0969°E
- Composition method: Presidential with confirmation of Chief Justice of India and Governor of respective state.
- Authorised by: Constitution of India
- Judge term length: mandatory retirement by age of 62
- Number of positions: 22 (Permanent-17; Additional-5)
- Website: highcourt.cg.gov.in

Chief Justice
- Currently: Krushna Ram Mohapatra
- Since: 7 September 2026

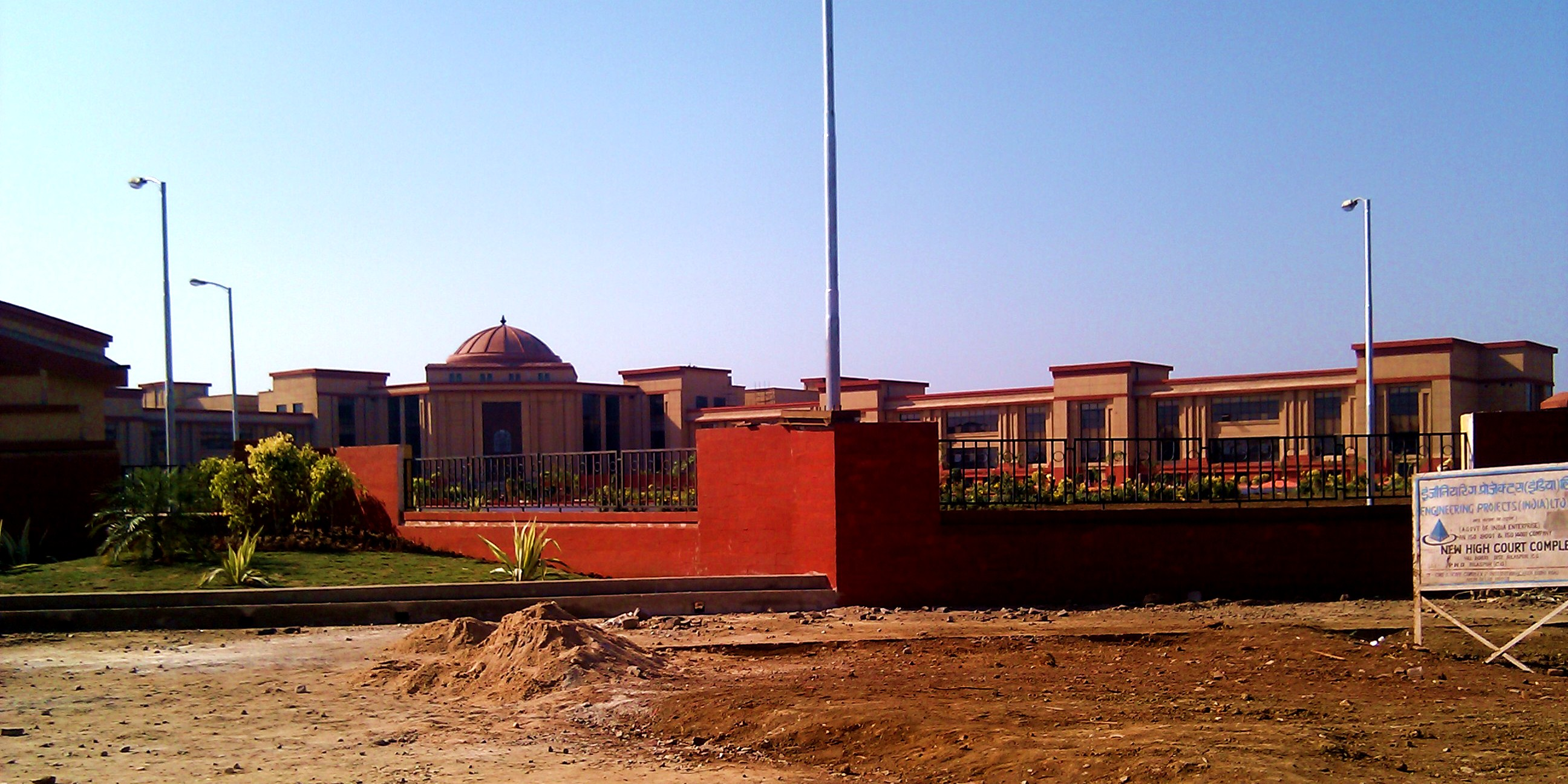

The Chhattisgarh High Court is one of the High Courts of India, located in Village Bodri, Bilaspur, with jurisdiction over the state of Chhattisgarh. It was established on 1 November 2000 with the creation of the new state of Chhattisgarh following the reorganisation of the state of Madhya Pradesh. The Chhattisgarh High Court is the 19th High Court of India.

Justice R. S. Garg was the first acting Chief Justice of the Chhattisgarh High Court.

== Chief Justice and Judges ==
The Chhattisgarh High Court sits in Bilaspur in the state of Chhattisgarh, and may have a maximum of 22 judges, of whom 17 may be permanent and 5 may be additionally appointed. Currently, the High Court has 14 judges.

== Former chief justices ==
#		Chief Justice	Tenure	
#	Portrait	Chief Justice	Start	Finish
1		W. A. Shishak	5 December 2000	15 January 2002
2		K. H. N. Kuranga	6 February 2002	10 May 2004
3		Ayyampalayam Somasundaram Venkatachala Moorthy	28 May 2004	7 January 2005
4		A. K. Patnaik	14 March 2005	1 October 2005
5		S. R. Nayak	17 November 2005	31 December 2006
6	H. L. Dattu	H. L. Dattu	12 February 2007	17 May 2007
7		Rajeev Gupta	2 February 2008	9 October 2012
8		Yatindra Singh	22 October 2012	8 October 2014
--		Navin Sinha	9 October 2014	8 April 2015
9		Navin Sinha	9 April 2015	13 May 2016
10		Deepak Gupta	16 May 2016	16 February 2017
11		Thottathil B. Radhakrishnan	18 March 2017	6 July 2018
12		Ajay Kumar Tripathi	7 July 2018	22 March 2019
--		Prashant Kumar Mishra	23 March 2019	6 May 2019
13		P. R. Ramachandra Menon	6 May 2019	31 May 2021
--		Prashant Kumar Mishra	1 June 2021	12 October 2021
14		Arup Kumar Goswami	12 October 2021	10 March 2023
--		Goutam Bhaduri	10 March 2023	28 March 2023
15		Ramesh Sinha	28 March 2023	4 September 2026
--		S. K. Agrawal	5 September 2026	6 September 2026

== Judges elevated as Chief Justices ==
This sections contains list of only those judges elevated as chief justices whose parent high court is Chhattisgarh. This includes those judges who, at the time of appointment as chief justice, may not be serving in Chhattisgarh Court but this list does not include judges who at the time of appointment as chief justice were serving in Chhattisgarh but does not have Chhattisgarh their Parent High Court.

Colour Key

- Female Chief Justice
- Served as Chief Justice of India

Symbol Key

- ^{‡} Elevated to Supreme Court of India
- ^{RES} Resigned
- ^{†} Died in office

Name	Image	Appointed as CJ in HC of	Date of appointment		Date of retirement (Note: this includes date of resignation, death and elevation to supreme court)	Tenure	
Name	Image	Appointed as CJ in HC of	As Judge	As Chief Justice	Date of retirement	As Chief Justice	As Judge (Note: also includes tenure as Chief Justice)
Sunil Kumar Sinha		Sikkim	1 December 2004	30 March 2015	6 July 2016	1 year, 99 days	11 years, 219 days
Satish Kumar Agnihotri		Sikkim	5 May 2005	22 September 2016	30 June 2018	1 year, 282 days	13 years, 57 days
Pritinker Diwaker		Allahabad	31 March 2009	26 March 2023	21 November 2023	241 days	14 years, 236 days
Prashant Kumar Mishra		Andhra Pradesh	10 December 2009	13 October 2021	18 May 2023^{[‡]}	1 year, 218 days	13 years, 160 days
Manindra Mohan Shrivastava		Rajasthan, transferred to Madras	10 December 2009	6 February 2024	5 March 2026	2 years, 28 days	16 years, 86 days
Sanjay Kumar Agrawal		Rajasthan	16 September 2013	7 September 2026	Incumbent	29 days	13 years, 20 days

=== Judges appointed as Acting Chief Justice ===
Name	Appointed as ACJ in HC of	Date of appointment as Judge	Period as Acting Chief Justice	Date of retirement	Tenure as ACJ	Tenure as Judge	Remarks	Ref..
L. C. Bhadoo	Chhattisgarh	20 January 2003	1 Jan 2007 – 11 Feb 2007	24 July 2008	42 days	5 years, 187 days	--	
S. K. Sinha	Sikkim	1 December 2004	8 Oct 2014 – 29 Mar 2015	6 July 2016	173 days	11 years, 219 days	Became permanent	
S. K. Agnihotri	Madras	5 May 2005	16 Feb 2014 – 25 Jul 2014	30 June 2018	160 days	13 years, 57 days	--	
S. K. Agnihotri	Sikkim	5 May 2005	7 Jul 2016 – 21 Sep 2016	30 June 2018	77 days	13 years, 57 days	Became permanent	
Pritinker Diwaker	Chhattisgarh	31 March 2009	17 Feb 2017 – 17 Mar 2017	21 November 2023	29 days	14 years, 236 days	--	
Pritinker Diwaker	Allahabad	31 March 2009	13 Feb 2023 – 25 Mar 2023	21 November 2023	41 days	14 years, 236 days	Became permanent	
P. K. Mishra	Chhattisgarh	10 December 2009	27 Mar 2019 – 5 May 2019	18 May 2023^{[‡]}	40 days	13 years, 160 days	--	
P. K. Mishra	Chhattisgarh	10 December 2009	1 Jun 2021 – 12 Oct 2021	18 May 2023^{[‡]}	133 days	13 years, 160 days	Elevated as CJ of Andhra Pradesh	
M. M. Shrivastava	Rajasthan	10 December 2009	7 Mar 2022 – 20 Jun 2022	5 March 2026	106 days	16 years, 86 days	--	
M. M. Shrivastava	Rajasthan	10 December 2009	2 Aug 2022 – 13 Oct 2022	5 March 2026	47 days	16 years, 86 days	--	
M. M. Shrivastava	Rajasthan	10 December 2009	6 Feb 2023 – 29 May 2023	5 March 2026	113 days	16 years, 86 days	--	
M. M. Shrivastava	Rajasthan	10 December 2009	9 Nov 2023 – 5 Feb 2024	5 March 2026	89 days	16 years, 86 days	Became permanent	
Goutam Bhaduri	Chhattisgarh	16 September 2013	11 Mar 2023 – 28 Mar 2023	9 November 2024	18 days	11 years, 55 days	--	
S. K. Agrawal	Chhattisgarh	16 September 2013	5 Sep 2026 – 6 Sep 2026	Incumbent	2 days	13 years, 20 days	Elevated as CJ of Rajasthan	
P. S. Koshy	Telangana	16 September 2013	18 Jul 2025 – 19 July 2025	Incumbent	2 days	13 years, 20 days	--	
P. S. Koshy	Telangana	16 September 2013	6 Oct 2026 – Incumbent	Incumbent	−2 days	13 years, 20 days		

== Judges elevated to Supreme Court ==
This section includes the list of only those judges whose parent high court was Chhattisgarh. This includes those judges who, at the time of elevation to Supreme Court of India, may not be serving in Chhattisgarh High Court but this list does not include judges who at the time of elevation were serving in Chhattisgarh High Court but does not have Chhattisgarh as their Parent High Court.

Colour Key

- Female Judge
- Served as Chief Justice of India

Symbol Key

- ^{RES} Resigned
- ^{†} Died in office

#	Name of the Judge	Image	Date of Appointment		Date of Retirement	Tenure			Immediately preceding office
#	Name of the Judge	Image	In Parent High Court	In Supreme Court	Date of Retirement	In High Court(s)	In Supreme Court	Total tenure (Note: Includes both tenure as High Court Judge as well as Supreme Court Judge)	Immediately preceding office
1	Prashant Kumar Mishra		10 December 2009	19 May 2023	Incumbent	13 years, 160 days	3 years, 140 days	16 years, 300 days	3rd CJ of Andhra Pradesh HC

== Chhattisgarh High Court Bar Association ==
Chhattisgarh High Court Bar Association is the representative body of advocates practicing in Bilaspur High Court elected by way of direct voting from about 2,400 members of the Bar Association and its officials have a term of two years.
