= P. R. Ramachandra Menon =

Former Chief Justice of Chhattisgarh High Court

Hon'ble Chief Justice (Retd.) P. R. Ramachandra Menon
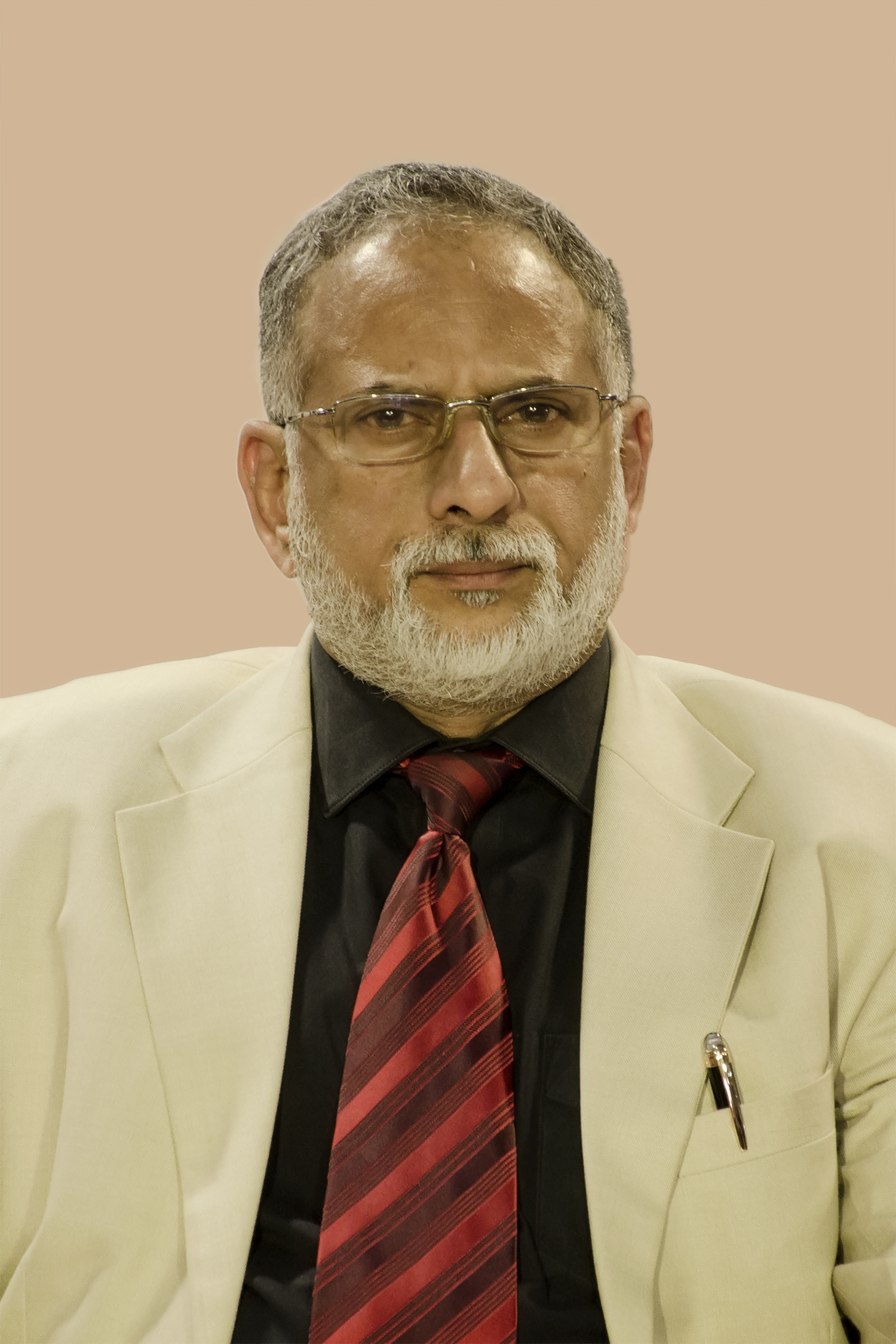

Chief Justice of Chhattisgarh High Court
- In office 6 May 2019 – 31 May 2021
- Nominated by: Ranjan Gogoi
- Appointed by: Ram Nath Kovind
- Preceded by: Prashant Kumar Mishra (acting)
- Succeeded by: Prashant Kumar Mishra (acting)

Judge of Kerala High Court
- In office 5 January 2009 – 5 May 2019
- Nominated by: K. G. Balakrishnan
- Appointed by: Pratibha Patil

Personal details
- Born: 1 June 1959 (age 67) Kerala
- Citizenship: Indian
- Education: Government Law College, Ernakulam
- Website: High Court of Chhattisgarh

Parappillil Ramakrishnan Nair Ramachandra Menon is a retired Indian judge, a former Chief justice of Chhattisgarh High Court and former judge of Kerala High Court.

== Early life and education ==
Ramachandra Menon was born on 1 June 1959. He obtained a law degree from Government Law College, Ernakulam.

== Career ==
Ramachandra Menon was enrolled as Advocate on 8 January 1983 and started practice at Ernakulam. He was elevated as Additional Judge of High Court of Kerala on 5 January 2009 and became permanent from 15 December 2010.

He was given charge as Chief justice of Chhattisgarh High Court on 30 April 2019 by President of India. He took oath on 6 May 2019 by Governor Anandiben Patel as Chief Justice of Chhattisgarh High Court.
