= Sandeep Mehta =

Judge of the Supreme Court of India

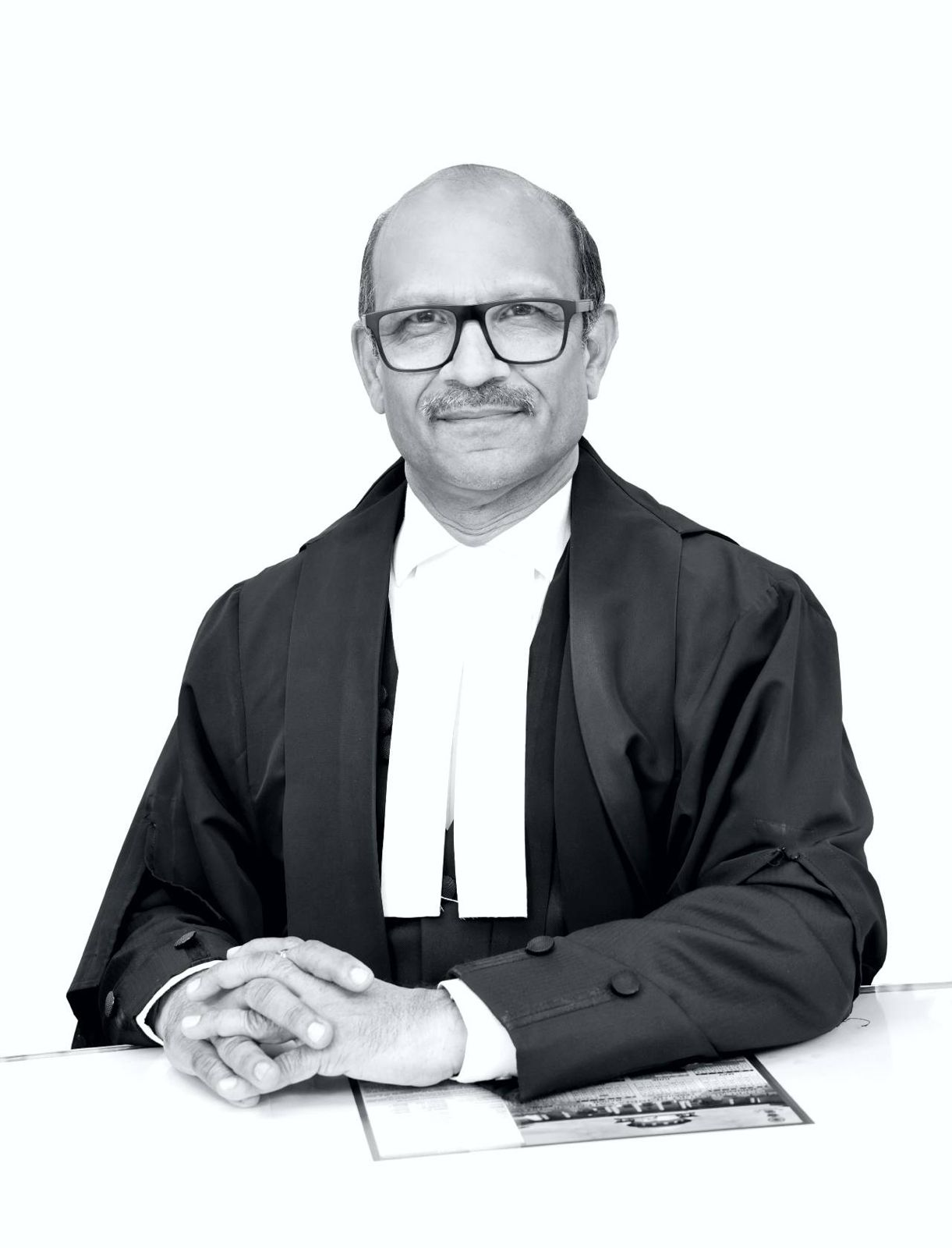

Judge of the Supreme Court of India
- Incumbent
- Assumed office 9 November 2023
- Nominated by: D. Y. Chandrachud
- Appointed by: Droupadi Murmu

41st Chief Justice of the Gauhati High Court
- In office 15 February 2023 – 8 November 2023
- Nominated by: D. Y. Chandrachud
- Appointed by: Droupadi Murmu
- Preceded by: R. M. Chhaya; N. Kotiswar Singh (acting)
- Succeeded by: Vijay Bishnoi; L. Jamir (acting)

Judge of the Rajasthan High Court
- In office 30 May 2011 – 14 February 2023
- Nominated by: S. H. Kapadia
- Appointed by: Pratibha Patil

Personal details
- Born: 11 January 1963 (age 63)
- Relations: G. S. Singhvi (Uncle)

Sandeep Mehta (born 11 January 1963) is a judge of the Supreme Court of India. He is a former chief justice of the Gauhati High Court and former judge of the Rajasthan High Court.

== Career ==
Mehta was enrolled as an advocate on 8 August 1986. He practiced mainly in criminal and constitutional matters. He was elevated as a judge of the Rajasthan High Court on 30 May 2011. He was appointed as chief justice of the Gauhati High Court on 15 February 2023. He was appointed as a judge of the Supreme Court of India on 9 November 2023.
