= Mirza Nasirullah Beg =

Indian Judge

Chief Justice of the Allahabad High Court
- In office 24 September 1966 – 3 June 1967
- Preceded by: Vashishtha Bhargava
- Succeeded by: Vidyadhar Govind Oak

Judge of the Allahabad High Court
- In office 1 June 1951 – 23 September 1966

Personal details
- Born: Lucknow, British India
- Parent: Mirza Samiullah Beg (father)
- Relatives: Mirza Hameedullah Beg (brother); Shahnaz Husain (daughter)
- Education: Presidency College, Chennai; University of Oxford
- Profession: Lawyer, Judge

Mirza Nasirullah Beg was an Indian judge and former chief justice of the Allahabad High Court.

== Early life and education ==
Beg hailed from a prominent legal family of Lucknow. His father Mirza Samiullah, was the chief justice of Hyderabad State and served as the governor of Nagpur during the pre-independence era. His younger brother, Mirza Hameedullah Beg, was the 15th Chief Justice of India. He was also the father of Indian entrepreneur Shahnaz Husain. Beg studied philosophy at Presidency College, Chennai, where he was tutored by Sarvepalli Radhakrishnan, who later became the president of India. He went to England to study law at the University of Oxford.

== Career ==
Beg began his legal practice in Uttar Pradesh. On 1 June 1951, he was appointed as a puisne judge of the Allahabad High Court. On 24 September 1966, he was elevated to Chief Justice of the Allahabad High Court. During his tenure, the Allahabad High Court celebrated its centenary On 25 November 1966, Justice Beg delivered the welcome address at the centenary celebrations held in Allahabad, which was inaugurated by the then President of India, Dr. Sarvepalli Radhakrishnan, and attended by Chief Justice of India K. Subba Rao. Justice Beg retired on 3 June 1967.
