= Shashi Kanta Verma =

Indian judge

Acting Governor of Uttar Pradesh
- In office 1 July 1972 – 13 November 1972
- President: V. V. Giri
- Preceded by: B. Gopala Reddy
- Succeeded by: Akbar Ali Khan

20th Chief Justice of the Allahabad High Court
- In office 19 May 1971 – 5 November 1973
- Preceded by: Vidyadhar Govind Oak
- Succeeded by: Dhatri Saran Mathur

Judge of the Allahabad High Court
- In office 30 June 1958 – 18 May 1971

Personal details
- Education: University of Allahabad; University of London; Gray's Inn
- Profession: Judge

Shashi Kanta Verma (6 November 1911 — 1988) was an Indian judge, former Chief Justice of the Allahabad High Court and former acting Governor of Uttar Pradesh.

== Career ==
Verma was born on 6 November 1911 in British India. He studied at Victoria Government High School in Ghazipur, Uttar Pradesh and passed law from the University of Allahabad. Verma went to England for higher studies in the University of London and being called to the bar at Gray's Inn, London. After returning India, he was enrolled as an advocate on 2 October 1939 and practiced civil and criminal side. On 30 June 1958, he became an Additional Judge of the Allahabad High Court. Verma was elevated to Chief Justice of the Allahabad High Court on 19 May 1971 and retired on 5 November 1973. While serving as Chief Justice, Verma was appointed Acting Governor of Uttar Pradesh in 1972. He took charge on 1 July 1972, following the departure of Governor B. Gopala Reddy, and served in an acting capacity until 13 November 1972.
