= Manulal Chunilal Desai =

Indian Judge

Chief Justice of the Allahabad High Court
- In office 17 February 1961 – 24 February 1966
- Preceded by: Orby Howell Mootham
- Succeeded by: Vashishtha Bhargava

Judge of the Allahabad High Court
- In office 13 December 1948 – 16 February 1961

Personal details
- Education: University of Bombay; University of Cambridge
- Profession: Judge

Manulal Chunilal Desai or M. C. Desai was an Indian Judge who served as the Chief Justice of the Allahabad High Court.

== Career ==
Desai studied in the University of Bombay later in University of Cambridge. He joined in Indian Civil Service on 18 October 1926 and served as Assistant Collector in the United Province in British India. Desai was appointed as a Puisne Judge of the Allahabad High Court in 1948. On 17 February 1961, he succeeded Sir Orby Howell Mootham as the 16th Chief Justice of the Allahabad High Court and served in this position for five years until his retirement on 24 February 1966.
