= D. M. Chandrashekhar =

8th Chief Justice of Karnataka High Court

Hon'ble Chief Justice (Retd.) D. M. Chandrashekhar

8th Chief Justice of Karnataka High Court
- In office 22 March 1978 – 25 September 1982
- Nominated by: M. H. Beg
- Appointed by: Neelam Sanjiva Reddy
- Preceded by: G. K. Govinda Bhat; C. Honniah (acting)
- Succeeded by: K. Bhimaiah

23rd Chief Justice of Allahabad High Court
- In office 10 May 1977 – 21 March 1978
- Nominated by: M. H. Beg
- Appointed by: B. D. Jatti
- Preceded by: Kunwar Bahadur Asthana
- Succeeded by: Satish Chandra

Judge of Allahabad High Court
- In office 5 July 1976 – 9 May 1977
- Nominated by: A. N. Ray
- Appointed by: Fakhruddin Ali Ahmed

Judge of Karnataka High Court
- In office 20 September 1963 – 4 July 1976
- Nominated by: B. P. Sinha
- Appointed by: S. Radhakrishnan

Personal details
- Born: 26 September 1920 Tiptur, Karnataka
- Died: 3 October 2003 (aged 83)
- Education: Central College, Bangalore (B.A in economics), Government Law College, Bombay (LL.B), Central Hindu College (M.A. in economics)

Deshmudre Mallappa Chandrashekhar (26 September 1920 ― 3 October 2003) was an Indian judge and former Chief Justice of the High Courts of Allahabad and Karnataka.

== Early life and education ==
Chandrashekhar was born on 26 September 1920 in Tiptur, Karnataka. His father, D.S. Mallappa, was a member of the Mysore Legislative Council whose frequent protests earned him the nickname "Walkout Mallappa". A young Chandrashekhar participated in the Quit India Movement of 1942, enduring a period of imprisonment for his dedication to the freedom struggle. He secured a law degree from Government Law College, Bombay, and later topped Banaras Hindu University with a gold medal while pursuing a master's degree in Economics. After a brief, unsuccessful brush with politics in the 1952 general elections, he anchored himself permanently to the legal profession, serving as Government Pleader and Assistant Advocate General.

== Career ==
Chandrashekhar's judicial career began with his elevation to the bench of the Mysore High Court on 20 September 1963 as additional judge. He later became permanent judge on 15 March 1965. During the 1975–1977 Emergency, he presided over habeas corpus petitions, ruling that courts retained the power to review the legality and bona fides of political detentions. This defiance of an authoritarian executive resulted in his punitive transfer to the Allahabad High Court on 5 July 1976. On one occasion, he rejected a request by Chief Justice of India A. N. Ray to sit alongside High Court judges to inspect potential nominees, reminding the CJI that the High Court was not administratively subordinate to the Supreme Court. He refused to dismiss cases simply because lawyers failed to appear, choosing instead to summon them to protect the rights of common litigants. He was appointed Chief Justice of the Allahabad High Court on 10 May 1977, and requested the CJI to withdraw his recommendation for his elevation to the Supreme Court.

=== Return to Karnataka High Court ===
When the Janata Party took power at the centre, he was appointed Chief Justice of the Allahabad High Court as the senior-most judge following retirement of Chief Justice Kunwar Bahadur Asthana on 10 May 1977. This appointment disrupted the expected line of succession for Justice Satish Chandra. Chandra resigned from his post. However, he subsequently withdrew his resignation under a mutual understanding that Chandrashekhar would eventually return to his home state. This created the first time an Indian High Court judge resigned and then revoked his resignation. The withdrawal triggered litigation. Chandra lost his initial case at the High Court level. However, he appealed and won in the Supreme Court. The ruling was delivered in Union of India v. Gopal Chandra Misra (AIR 1978 SC 694).

Following the Supreme Court's verdict, Chandrashekhar stepped aside and returned to head the Karnataka High Court. This cleared the path for Chandra to officially assume the mantle of Chief Justice of the Allahabad High Court. Chandra later went on to serve as the Chief Justice of the Calcutta High Court.

He later returned to his home state, serving as the Chief Justice of the Karnataka High Court until his retirement on 25 September 1982.

== Post retirement and death ==
He lived as a devout Gandhian, treating his time and resources as public trusts. He conducted arbitration proceedings out of Gandhi Bhavan to cut down costs for litigants, and once moved out of London's Hotel Savoy into the modest Bharatiya Vidya Bhavan during an official trip to avoid waste of public funds. He declined a civic felicitation in his hometown, asking that the funds collected be spent on local municipal infrastructure instead.Supported by his wife, Umadevi, his final acts mirrored his lifelong philosophy of selflessness. Upon his death on 3 October 2003, his savings were donated to charity, his eyes were sent to an eye bank, and his body was donated to medical research at M. S. Ramaiah Medical College.
