= Ghulam Hasan =

Indian judge (1891 - 1954)

Ghulam Hassan

Judge of Supreme Court of India
- In office 8 September 1952 – 5 November 1954
- Nominated by: M. Patanjali Sastri
- Appointed by: Rajendra Prasad

Judge of Allahabad High Court
- In office 26 July 1948 – 3 July 1951
- Appointed by: C. Rajagopalachari

Chief Judge of Oudh Chief Court
- In office 23 June 1940 – 26 July 1948
- Appointed by: George VI

Personal details
- Born: 3 July 1891
- Died: 5 November 1954 (aged 63)

Ghulam Hasan (3 July 1891 - 5 November 1954) was a judge of the Supreme Court of India, serving from 8 September 1952 until his death on 5 November 1954.

== Life and work ==
He was the Senior Judge of the Allahabad High Court. He was conferred the Knighthood of the order of St. John of Jerusalem for humanitarian service. He was a member of the Oudh Bar from September 1940. He became Chief Judge on 23 June 1940. He served as the Chief Judge of the Oudh (also spelled Awadh) Chief Court until 25 July 1948 and became a Judge of the High Court after amalgamation. After his retirement in the year 1951, he took on the position of a Judge of the Supreme Court of India.

He also served as the Chairman of the Ajmer Sharif Dargah Enquiry Committee 1949, and the Chairman of the Provincial Red Cross and St. John Ambulance Association India which is officially linked with the Order of St John. He was also elected as the president of the Board of Governments, La Martinière School for Girls and La Martinière College for Boys. He died in November 1954. According to the news report published by Times of India he died in the office. Other judges who died in the office include P. Satanarayana Raju (died in the office in 1966), Surendra Narayan Dwidevi (died in the office in 1974), S M Fazal Ali (1985), P Govinda Menon (1957), M Srinivasan (2000) and Shantanagoudar (2021).
