= Shahnaz Husain =

Indian businesswoman (born 1944)

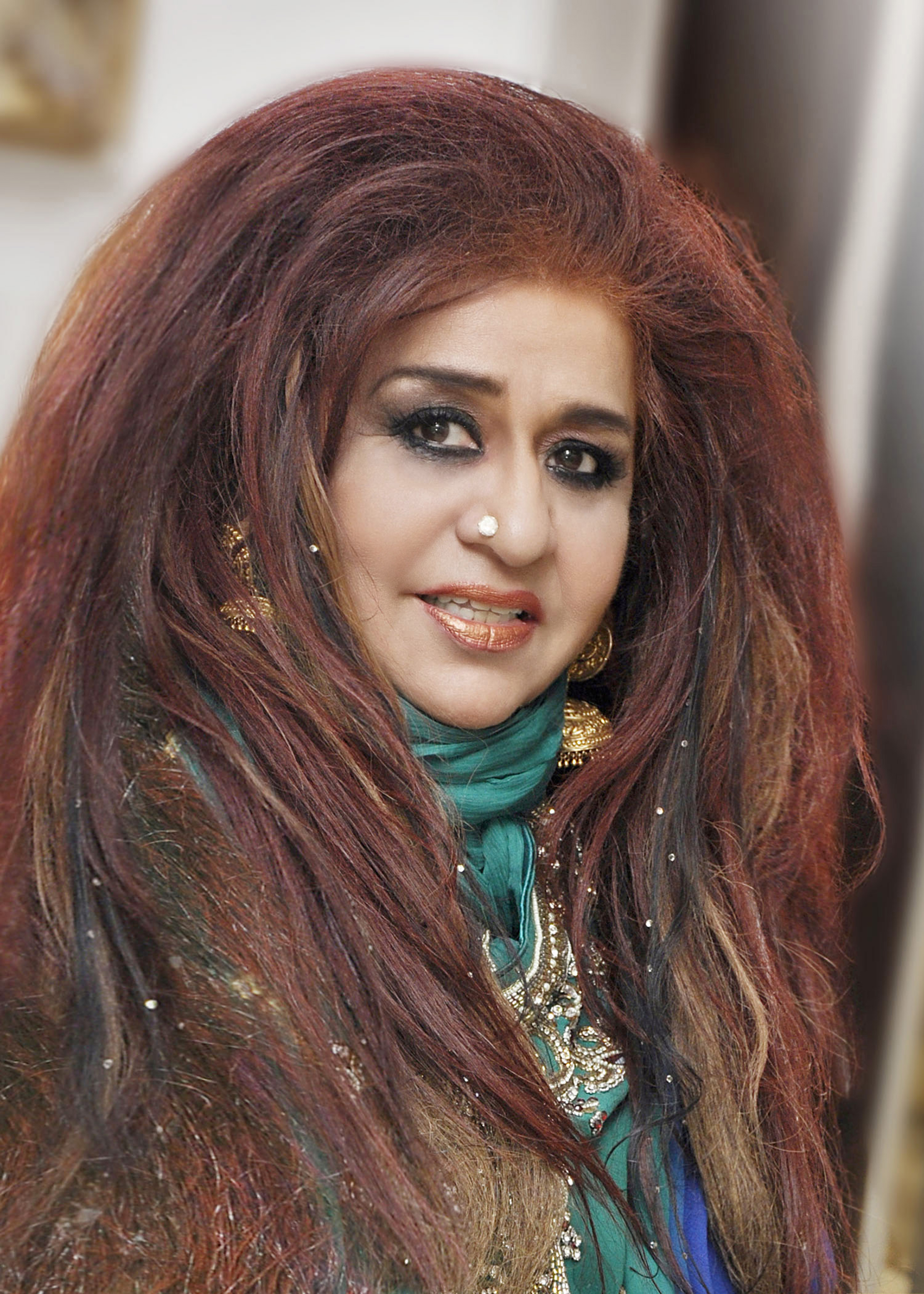
- Shahnaz Husain
- Born: 5 November 1944 (age 81); Allahabad, British India
- Education: St. Mary's Convent Inter College, Allahabad, India
- Occupation: Businesswoman
- Awards: Padma Shri
- Website: shahnaz.in

Shahnaz Husain (born 5 November 1944) is an Indian businesswoman and the founder, chairperson and managing director of, The Shahnaz Husain Group. She has received acclaim for pioneering the herbal beauty care movement and taking the Indian herbal heritage of Ayurveda worldwide. In 2006, she was awarded the Padma Shri, the fourth highest civilian award, by the Government of India for her contribution to the fields of trade and industry.

Husain was invited by Harvard Business School to speak on her experience of establishing an international brand without commercial advertising and has also become a Harvard Case Study which is included in its curriculum. She has also lectured to students at Massachusetts Institute of Technology (MIT), University of Oxford and London School of Economics. Shahnaz has also represented India at President Barack Obama's World Summit for Entrepreneurs. In 1996, she won Success Magazine's "World's Greatest Woman Entrepreneur" award. She has walked the red carpet at the Cannes Film Festival and has spoken at both the House of Lords and House of Commons in the British Parliament.

== Personal life ==
Born Shahnaz Beg, she is the daughter of Justice Mirza Nasirullah Beg, a former Chief Justice of the Allahabad High Court and Sayeeda Begum, who was the daughter of the Commander-in-chief of the Hyderabad army. Her grandfather, Justice Samiullah Beg, was a prominent politician of the United Province who later served as Chief Justice of the Hyderabad High Court. Her uncle, Mirza Hameedullah Beg, was a former Chief Justice of India. She married on Arshad ullah khan saroha on 1967.

Shahnaz studied at St. Mary's Convent Inter College, Prayagraj. She was married at an early age to Nasir Husain with whom she has two children. She studied Ayurveda in Iran while Nasir Husain was posted in Tehran. She then completed her training in cosmetic therapy and cosmetology from leading institutions of the West, such as Helena Rubinstein, Schwarzkopf, Christine Valmy, Lancome and Lean of Copenhagen. She returned to India and started Women's World in New Delhi at her home. The then Prime Minister of India, Indira Gandhi, frequently visited her.

== About The Shahnaz Husain Group ==
Adopting the concept of Herbal Care and Cure, Shahnaz opened her first herbal clinic in 1971 and over the next few years formed The Shahnaz Husain Group. She formulated therapeutic products for specific skin and hair problems, as well as premium ranges for skin care, such as 24 Carat Gold, Oxygen, Diamond, Pearl, Plant Stem Cells and Platinum Range. The company also sells its products online at http://shahnaz.in. The Shahnaz Husain Group has over 400 franchise ventures across the world covering over 138 'without animal testing' countries. The first franchise clinic opened in Calcutta in 1979. Within a year, there were 80 Shahnaz Herbal franchise clinics in India. The first foreign Shahnaz Herbal franchise clinic was opened in London in 1982. The group also operates its premium Ayurveda Salon and Spa treatment center in New Delhi to offer a line of proprietary treatments for Skin, Hair and Body.

== Corporate social responsibility ==
Shahnaz has tied up with Government skill development projects in beauty and wellness. Her beauty academy has trained and certified over 40,000 under-privileged women, distributing tool kits for home-based business

== Awards ==
Shahnaz Husain has received several international and national awards for her contribution in the beauty industry:

Year	Origin	Awards Name
1985	National	Outstanding Woman Entrepreneur from FICCI
1996	International	"World's Greatest Entrepreneur" award, from Success, the prestigious U.S. business magazine, becoming the first woman to receive the award in 105 years.
2006	National	Padmashri Award – Fourth highest civilian awards from the Government of India, presented by the President of India.
2009	International	Leonardo da Vinci Diamond Award by International Biographical Centre at Washington DC
2009	National	Woman of Substance Award from Indian Chamber of Commerce and Industry (ICCI)
2011	National	Lifetime Leadership Achievement Award at the 2nd Annual Women In Leadership (WIL) Forum.
2012	International	Outstanding Ayurvedic Innovation Award in London from the Indo-British Business Forum at the House of Commons, British Parliament.
2012	International	Olympia Asia Award for Outstanding Contribution in Ayurveda and Plant Cosmetics at the Olympia Beauty Show in London.
2013	International	Glory of India Award in Dubai for outstanding innovations in Ayurvedic beauty care.
2014	International	Golden Peacock Entrepreneurial Leadership Award for 2014 in London for Ayurvedic Innovation.
2015	National	Entrepreneur India Award 2015 for Outstanding Ayurvedic Innovations from Entrepreneur Media India, FICCI, NEN and NASSCOM
2017	National	"Woman Super Achiever" Award in Mumbai, sponsored by Femina
2017	National	Ayurveda Innovation Award from Suryadatta Group, Pune.

== Publications / further reading ==
1. Shahnaz Husain Beauty Book (https://www.amazon.in/Shahnaz-Husains-Beauty-Book-Husain/dp/8122200605)

2. Flame Book (https://www.thehindu.com/features/magazine/my-mothers-story/article3359825.ece)
