= Bidhu Bhushan Malik =

Indian Judge

Governor of the United Provinces (acting)
- In office 3 March 1949 – 1 May 1949
- Preceded by: Sarojini Naidu
- Succeeded by: Hormasji Peroshaw Mody

Chief Justice of the Allahabad High Court
- In office 15 October 1947 – 11 January 1955
- Preceded by: Kamalkanta Verma
- Succeeded by: Orby Howell Mootham

Personal details
- Profession: Judge

Bidhu Bhushan Malik (born: 1895) was an Indian judge who served as the first post-Independence Indian Chief Justice of the Allahabad High Court. He also served as the acting Governor of the United Provinces.

== Career ==
Malik was appointed as a judge of the Allahabad High Court in 1944. On 15 October 1947 he took charge as the Chief Justice of the Allahabad High Court. Following the sudden demise of Sarojini Naidu, Malik assumed the role of acting Governor of the state on 3 March 1949 to 1 May 1949.
