= 1969 Telangana Agitation =

Political movement in India

1969 Telangana Agitation was a political movement for the statehood for Telangana region. The issue of Telangana was first raised in October or November of 1968, when a person named Ravindranath went on a hunger strike on8 January 1969 in Khammam near the Railway Station. He was on an indefinite fast and his prime demand was to implement Telangana safeguards. One other demand was his insistence on implementation of the Gentleman's agreement. It is a major event in Telangana movement. In the indiscriminate police firing, 3 Telangana students were killed.

Map of India with the Telangana region highlighted in red

On 22 December 1953, the States Reorganisation Commission was appointed to prepare for the creation of states on linguistic lines. The commission, due to public demand, recommended disintegration of Hyderabad state and to merge Marathi speaking region with Bombay state and Kannada speaking region with Mysore state. The States Reorganisation Commission (SRC) discussed the pros and cons of a merger between Telugu speaking Telangana region of Hyderabad state and Andhra state. Para 369 of the SRC report said:

The creation of Vishalandhra is an ideal to which numerous individuals and public bodies, both in Andhra and Telangana, have been passionately attached over a long period of time, and unless there are strong reasons to the contrary, this sentiment is entitled to consideration.

Discussing the case of Telangana, para 389 of the SRC report said:

One of the principal causes of opposition of Vishalandhra also seems to be the apprehension felt by the educationally backward people of Telangana that they may be swamped and exploited by the more advanced people of the coastal areas.

In its final analysis SRC recommended against the immediate merger.In para 389 it said:

After taking all these factors into consideration we have come to the conclusions that it will be in the interests of Andhra as well as Telangana, if for the present, the Telangana area is to constitute into a separate State, which may be known as the Hyderabad State with provision for its unification with Andhra after the general elections likely to be held in or about 1961 if by a two-thirds majority the legislature of the residuary Hyderabad State expresses itself in favor of such unification.

After going through the recommendations of the SRC, the then Home Minister Pandit Govind Ballabh Pant decided to merge Andhra state and Telangana to form Andhra Pradesh state on 1 November 1956 after providing safeguards to Telangana in the form of Gentlemen's agreement.

== January–April 1969 ==
In the years after the formation of Andhra Pradesh state, people of Telangana expressed dissatisfaction over how the agreements and guarantees were implemented. Discontent intensified in January, when the guarantees that had been agreed on were supposed to lapse. All the Andhra employees who migrated to capital city in 1956 will be considered 'local' in 1969 after 12 years of residence per mulki rules. Student agitation for the continuation of the agreement began at Palvancha in Khammam district and spread to other parts of the region. One section of students (which appeared dominant) wanted a separate state of Telangana while the other wanted implementation of safeguards.

On 19 January, an all party accord was reached to ensure the proper implementation of Telangana safeguards. Accord's main points were

1. All non-Telangana employees holding posts reserved for Telangana locals will be transferred immediately
2. Telangana surpluses will be used for Telangana development
3. Appeal to Telangana students to call off agitation.

On 23 January, protests turned violent when a crowd of about 1000 agitators tried to set fire to a Sub-Inspector's residence. This resulted in police firing in which 17 people were injured who were admitted to various hospitals. Meanwhile, certain Andhra employees challenged the transfer orders promised by the all party accord, by filing a petition in the AP high court. On 29 January, Army was called in by the government to maintain law & order as the Agitation quickly turned violent. In February, Mulki rules (local jobs for local people), as promised in Gentleman's agreement, were declared by high court as void but this judgement was stayed by divisional bench of high court. Quoting statistics of development in Telangana area over the last 12 years, the chief minister maintained the state of the Andhra Pradesh was "irreversible" and made an appeal to people to help maintain unity & integrity. Protests continued in March, and a bundh turned violent when protestors burnt buses.

In April, protestors tried to disrupt a meeting of CPI (which was opposed to the division of the state) by indulging in stone-pelting. Police had to resort to live firing after their attempts to control the crowd by a lathi charge and firing in the air did not yield results. In the ensuing firing, three people were killed and several injured. Around 354 arrests were made related to various arson incidents during the agitation. Then Prime minister Indira Gandhi called for a high-level meeting to discuss the issue while ruling out the division of the state. After several days of talks with leaders of both regions, on 11 April 1969, the prime minister came up with an Eight point plan.

== Eight point plan ==
After several days of talks with leaders of both regions, on 11 April 1969, Prime minister came up with Eight point plan.

=== Eight point plan ===
This plan includes appointment of Five committees:

1. High-powered committee would be set up to determine financial surpluses to Telangana
2. Telangana development committee
3. Plan implementation committee
4. Committee of jurists to be consulted on safeguards
5. Committees to look into grievances of public servants

Telangana leaders were not satisfied with the accord.

== Government spending diversion ==
Justice Bhargava committee headed by Justice Vashishtha Bhargava which looked into Telangana surpluses, found that 283 million rupees diverted from Telangana to Andhra region between 1956 and 1968. Economist C H Hanumanth Rao further analysed the data from the committee report and concluded that for Telangana, cumulative surplus with interest during that period was 1.174 Billion rupees. During this period, the revenue budget of the state grew from 586 million rupees in 1957 to 2.04 billion rupees in 1968.

Government employees and opposition members of the state legislative assembly threatened "direct action" in support of the students. Purushotham Rao was for outright separation, and he supported the student views. He unveiled a map of Telangana in the state assembly.

== Chenna Reddy and Telangana Praja Samithi ==
Although the Congress faced some dissension within its ranks, its leadership stood against additional linguistic states. As a result, defectors from the Congress, led by M. Chenna Reddy, founded the Telangana Praja Samithi(TPS) political party in 1969 which intensified the movement. In June, Prime Minister Indira Gandhi came to Hyderabad to discuss the issue with Telangana leaders. Telangana employee unions started strike on 10 June supporting Telangana movement. Major leaders of the movement were jailed in July and released in August upon court's intervention. With the success of bye elections, TPS become full-fledged political party. Due to Congress party's refusal of formation of Telangana state, TPS decided to contest Parliamentary election alone even though Congress party tried to become electoral ally. In the May 1971 parliamentary elections, Telangana Praja Samithi won 10 out the 14 Parliament seats in Telangana. Despite these electoral successes, some of the new party leaders gave up their agitation in September 1971 after realising that the Prime Minister was not inclined to towards a separate state of Telangana, and rejoined the safer political haven of the Congress ranks. In a book written by then Secretary of External Affairs, T.N. Kaul and published in 1982, he mentioned that in 1969 Prime minister Indira Gandhi wanted to commence the process of formation of a separate state for Telangana by instructing Sri P.N. Haksur, her senior secretary in the PMO, but she had to withdraw at the last minute due to intervention by Kaul who dissuaded her from it by reminding that Hyderabad's case was pending in the Security Council. United Nations dropped the case of Hyderabad on 2 September 1979.

During this period, the Government promised to correct what critics saw as a violation of the promises of the Gentleman's agreement in the areas of jobs, budget allocations, and educational facilities. Prime Minister Indira Gandhi was strongly against the division of the state, but on her recommendation, P. V. Narasimha Rao became the first Chief minister of Andhra Pradesh from Telangana on 30 September 1971.

In 1972, candidates of the Telangana Praja Samithi party contested all the available seats for the assembly elections. However, only Thakkalapalli Purushothama Rao got elected, from Wardhannapet constituency in Warangal District.

== Memorial ==
A memorial called Gun Park was built near Public Gardens, Hyderabad to commemorate students who lost their lives in the struggles of 1969. 369 people died during this agitation, most of them were students and were killed in police firing.
