= MV Ramana Reddy =

Indian sculpture artist (b. 1966)

Ramana Reddy
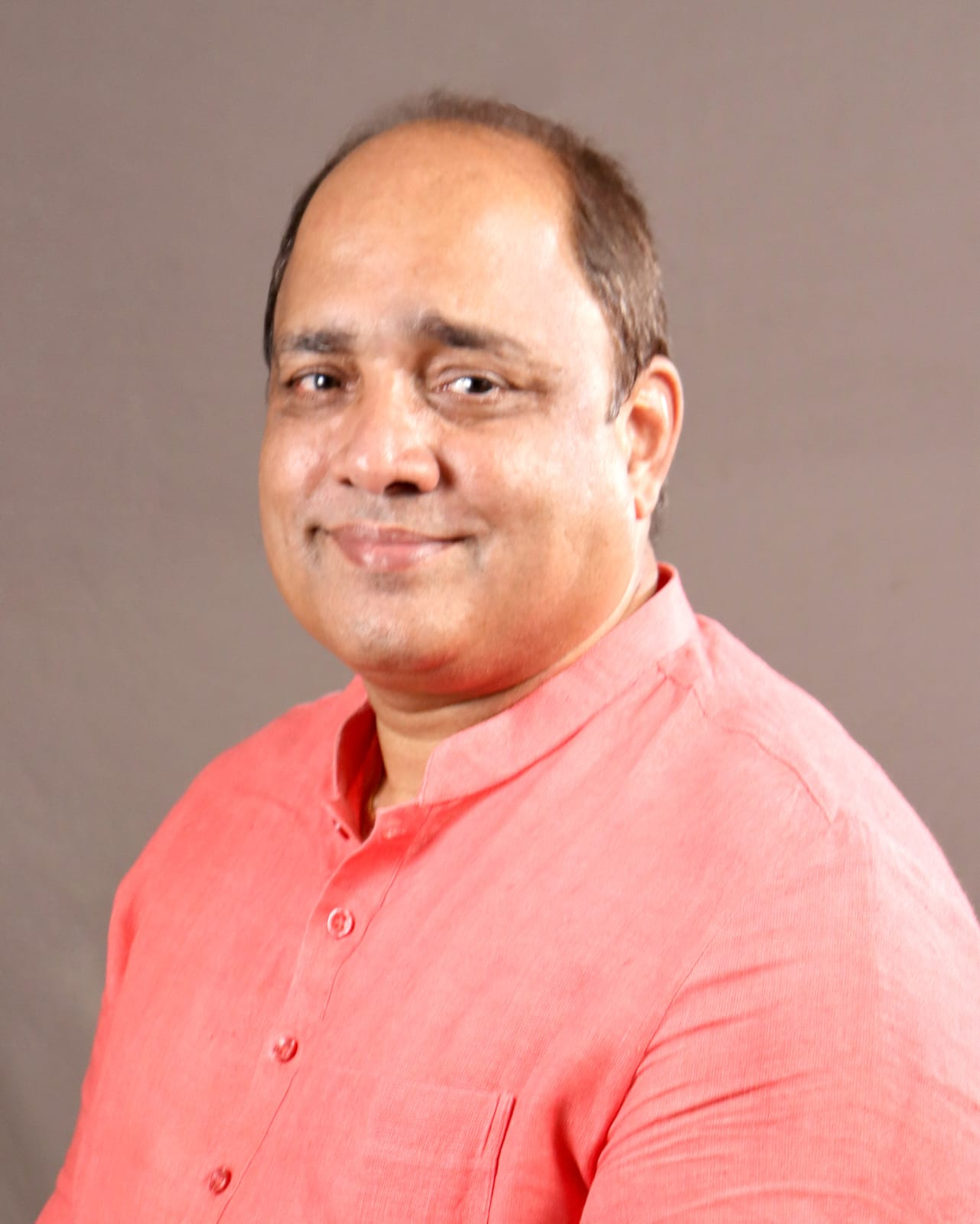
- Born: July 10, 1966 (age 60); Hyderabad, Telangana, India
- Education: Jawaharlal Nehru Architecture and Fine Arts University
- Known for: Telangana Martyrs Memorial

MV Ramana Reddy (born 10 July 1966) is an Indian-origin sculpture artist specializing in sculpture, conceptual, and installation art. He is best known for his design of the Telangana Martyrs Memorial.

He is the founder and convener of Telangana Artist Forum which was established in 2009.

== Early life and education ==
Reddy was born on 10 July 1966 in Siddipet, Telangana. A Master of Fine Arts and a Gold Medallist in Bachelor of Fine Arts in Sculpture from formerly JNTU and now Jawaharlal Nehru Architecture and Fine Arts University (JNAFAU), Hyderabad in 1991. Went on a cultural exchange tour to Germany, sponsored by ICCR, Government of India in 1991, he worked on public art installations in Memmingen, Munich, Ulm, Blaubeuren, Germany, India, USA, Japan, Austria, and Australia.

== Career ==
Reddy started his career as an artist from Hyderabad.

In July 2017, Reddy designed the logo of World Telugu Conference. The logo has logo has the famous Kakatiya Thoranam (arch), a map of Telangana with two giant elephants.

In February 2020, Reddy became the first general council member from Telangana State at the Lalit Kala Akademi, New Delhi.

Reddy is the president of Hyderabad Art Society, which was established in 1941. He anonymously elected 3 times from 2015.

He is also the member of Board of Studies at Dr YSR Architecture & Fine Arts University, Kadapa 2021–22.

In 2018, Reddy designed Telangana Martyrs Memorial as a main architect. Telangana Martyrs Memorial was built in the memory of 369 students who died during the 1969 agitation for a separate Telangana state.

== Notable work and exhibitions ==
- Telangana Martyrs Memorial 2023
- Nukala Ramachandra Reddy 10 feet bronze statue at Mahbubabad.
- 2013 Hyderabad Metro Rail 30 feet stainless steel sculpture pylon conceptual design.
- 25 feet stainless steel sculpture for ‘Shilparamam’, Hyderabad.
- Exhibited artworks at the Indian Consulate General office in Munich Germany in 2002
- Solo Show at Gallery 678, Broadway, New York, USA, in 1998

== Awards ==
- Telangana state award 2015 presented by K. Chandrashekar Rao Government of Telangana on the occasion of the first state formation celebrations
- ‘Vishista Puraskaram’ 2023 by Potti Sreeramulu Telugu University, Hyderabad
- Awarded by Government of Telangana in 2018 for Designing & execution Supervision of the Telangana Martyrs Memorial.

== Books and publications ==
- 'Bio-Diversity – Aesthetics' An artistic Reflection, 2012, Author: M. V. Ramana Reddy

== In popular culture ==
A book named M. V. Ramana Reddy, Path to Artistic Brilliance – A Journey Unveiled was written in 2023 by Koeli Mukherjee Ghose on the life of Reddy.

Another book, Ramana Reddy - Precious Naivete, was written by Marta Jakimowicz.
