= Kamalkanta Verma =

1st Chief Justice of Rajasthan High Court

Hob'ble Chief Justice Kamalkanta Verma

1st Chief Justice of Rajasthan High Court
- In office 29 August 1949 – 24 January 1950
- Appointed by: Sawai Man Singh II
- Preceded by: Position established
- Succeeded by: Kailas Nath Wanchoo

Chief Justice of Udaipur High Court
- In office 18 April 1948 – 28 August 1949
- Appointed by: Bhupal Singh
- Preceded by: Position established
- Succeeded by: Position abolished (merged into Rajasthan High Court)

13th Chief Justice of Allahabad High Court
- In office 17 September 1946 – 14 October 1947
- Appointed by: George VI
- Preceded by: Iqbal Ahmad
- Succeeded by: Bidhu Bhushan Malik

Judge of Allahabad High Court
- In office 1937 – 16 September 1946
- Appointed by: George VI

Personal details
- Born: 1887
- Died: Not known
- Occupation: Judge

Kamalkanta Verma (born 1887–died not known) was an Indian judge who had served as 1st Chief Justice of Rajasthan High Court. He also served as Chief Justice and judge of the Allahabad High Court.

== Life and career ==
Verma was born in 1887. He was appointed as Additional Assistant Government Advocate in 1933. He became Acting Judge of Allahabad High Court in 1937 and subsequently became permanent in later 1937. He served on the court for nearly a decade before succeeding Justice Iqbal Ahmad as Chief Justice on 17 September 1946 until 1947. He was appointed as Chief Justice of the Udaipur High Court upon its creation by Maharana Bhupal Singh on 18 April 1948 and later became chief justice of the High Court of Greater Rajasthan, which today is known as Rajasthan High Court, upon its creation on 29 August 1949 by Sawai Man Singh. He has to retire on 24 January 1950, before commencement of Constitution of India, because of constitutional upper limit for the High Court judges being 60 years of age.
