= Kailas Nath Wanchoo =

10th Chief Justice of India

Hon'ble Chief Justice Kailas Nath Wanchoo
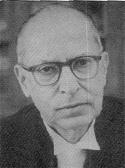

10th Chief Justice of India
- In office 12 April 1967 – 24 February 1968
- Appointed by: S. Radhakrishnan
- Preceded by: Koka Subba Rao
- Succeeded by: M. Hidayatullah

Judge of Supreme Court of India
- In office 11 August 1958 – 11 April 1967
- Nominated by: Sudhi Ranjan Das
- Appointed by: Rajendra Prasad

2nd Chief Justice of Rajasthan High Court
- In office 2 January 1951 – 10 August 1958
- Nominated by: H. J. Kania
- Appointed by: Rajendra Prasad
- Preceded by: Kamalkanta Verma; Nawal Kishore (acting)
- Succeeded by: Sarjoo Prasad; K. L. Bapna (acting)

Judge of Allahabad High Court
- In office 17 February 1947 – 1 January 1951
- Appointed by: Lord Wavell
- Chief Justice: Kamalkanta Verma

Personal details
- Born: 25 February 1903 Mandsaur, Madhya Pradesh
- Died: 14 August 1988 (aged 85)
- Education: Muir Central College, Wadham College

Kailas Nath Wanchoo (25 February 1903–14 August 1988) was Indian jurist, who served as the tenth Chief Justice of India. He also served as Chief Justice of the Rajasthan High Court and as a judge of the Allahabad High Court.

== Early life and education ==
Wanchoo was born in Mandsaur at Madhya Pradesh into a Kashmiri Pandit family and was educated on primary at Nowgong, Madhya Pradesh and middle at Pandit Pirthi Nath High School, Kanpur, Muir Central College, Allahabad and Wadham College, Oxford. He joined the Indian Civil Service as Joint Magistrate in October 1926 in Uttar Pradesh. Wanchoo passed the Indian Civil Service examination in 1924 and formally joined the service on 1 December 1926. He served in the United Provinces (present-day Uttar Pradesh), holding administrative and judicial positions, including Joint Magistrate and became District and Sessions Judge in 1933.

== Career ==
He was appointed as Acting Judge of Allahabad High Court on 17 February 1947 and as permanent judge on 12 December 1947. He served at Allahabad until 2 January 1951 when he was appointed as the second Chief Justice of the Rajasthan High Court succeeding Kamalkanta Verma. He held that office from 2 January 1951 until 10 August 1958, longest for any chief justice of Rajasthan High Court, overseeing the court during its formative post-Independence years. During his period in Rajasthan and Allahabad, he also undertook important public assignments, including chairing the Uttar Pradesh Judicial Reforms Committee (1950–51), heading the Indore Firing Inquiry Commission in 1954 and Dhoulpur Succession Case Commission in 1955, and serving on the Law Commission of India in 1955.

== In Supreme Court ==
On 11 August 1958, Wanchoo was elevated to the Supreme Court of India. During his nearly nine-and-a-half-year tenure on the Supreme Court, Wanchoo participated in numerous cases involving constitutional interpretation, civil disputes, property rights, taxation and industrial relations. One of the most significant cases in which he participated was I.C. Golaknath v. State of Punjab (1967). In this landmark constitutional dispute, the majority held that Parliament could not amend Fundamental Rights under Article 368, as the law was then interpreted. Wanchoo dissented, maintaining that Parliament possessed the authority to amend the Constitution, including its provisions concerning Fundamental Rights. His opinion reflected his broader understanding of Parliament's constituent power and the constitutional amendment process.

In April 1967, he was sworn in as the 10th Chief Justice of India following the resignation of Koka Subba Rao from the position on announcing his presidential campaign. He was the only person to rose to the office of Chief Justice of India by entering the judiciary through the Indian Civil Service (ICS) rather than through legal practice. As Chief Justice of India, he administered the oath of office to the 3rd President of India Zakir Husain.

In his tenure of 9 years and 108 days in the Supreme Court of India, he authored 1007 Judgments. He was the part of 556 five judge benches which is the highest for any of the Supreme Court judge.

== Post retirement ==
After retiring as the Chief Justice of India in February 1968, Wanchoo continued to serve in several important public assignments. He chaired the Railway Accidents Inquiry Committee from 3 April 1968 to 31 August 1969, the Board of Arbitration under the Ministry of Labour (1968–1975), and the Direct Taxes Inquiry Committee (1970–1971), whose report examined tax evasion and black money and became known as the Wanchoo Committee Report. He also headed a committee on safeguards for Telangana employees and an inquiry into corruption allegations in West Bengal. These assignments reflected the continued reliance on his judicial experience in public administration and policy-making.

Legal offices
Preceded by Koka Subba Rao	Chief Justice of India; 12 April 1967 – 24 February 1968	Succeeded by Mohammad Hidayatullah
