= Amitav Banerji =

Indian judge (born 1926)

Amitav Banerji (born 5 December 1926) is an Indian former judge who was Chief Justice of the Allahabad High Court.

== Career ==
Banerji was educated at A.B.I. College, Allahabad and got his law degree from the Allahabad University. He was enrolled as an advocate on 27 August 1951 and started practice in the Allahabad High Court. Banerji worked on Criminal matters as well as the Civil, Constitution and Company matters. In 1973 he was appointed additional judge of the Allahabad High Court and became permanent judge on 4 August 1975. Justice Banerji was elevated as the Chief Justice of the Allahabad High Court on 16 July 1987 and retired on 6 November 1988.
