= John Stanley (judge) =

British judge in India

John Stanley KCIE CBE
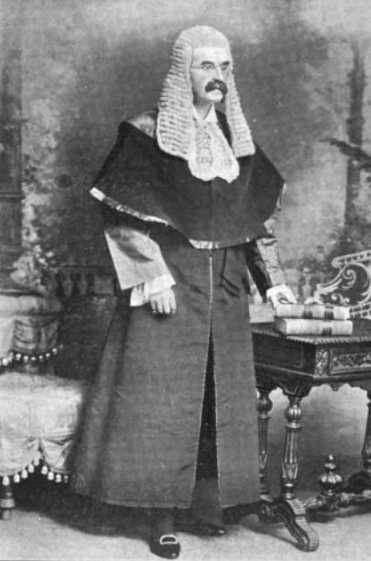

7th Chief Justice of Allahabad High Court
- In office 17 August 1901 – 21 April 1911
- Appointed by: Edward VII
- Preceded by: Arthur Strachey
- Succeeded by: Henry George Richards

Judge of Calcutta High Court
- In office November 1898 – 16 August 1901
- Appointed by: Queen Victoria

Personal details
- Born: 22 November 1846 Armagh, Ulster
- Died: 7 December 1931 (aged 85)
- Resting place: East Sheen Cemetery
- Spouse: Lady Anne Stanley
- Education: The Royal School, Armagh; Trinity College Dublin
- Occupation: Jurist

Sir John Stanley KCIE CBE (22 November 1846 – 7 December 1931) was a Chief Justice of the North-Western Provinces in British India at the High Court of Allahabad. He was also former judge of Calcutta High Court.

He was born in Armagh to the Stanley family of Derryhale, County Armagh, Ulster. He was educated at The Royal School, Armagh and at Trinity College Dublin. He was appointed as chief justice of Allahabad High Court on 17 August 1901 and served as such till 21 April 1911.

On his retirement from Allahabad, the Allahabad Pioneer newspaper reported:

As a judge Sir John Stanley was one of the hardest workers the Allahabad Court had ever had. A trained lawyer quick to form and to formulate his conclusions, his unfailing sincerity and the zeal with which he strove to reduce, as far as might be, the law's delays, were recognized on all hands; and with the leaders of the Bar he was on the best of terms. Sir John Stanley's crowning achievement had been the extraction from a somewhat reluctant Government of an undertaking to construct a new High Court building.

Last month he had the pleasure of laying the foundation stone of the new building, whose erection will for ever lay the spectre of a transfer of the Court to Lucknow, which has for long haunted the imagination of the Hallabad [sic] Bar and public. Many a good cause will have reason before long to feel the loss of Sir John and Lady Stanley; but today it is for a host of private friends to realise the loss they are sustaining in the departure of the high-minded lady and gentleman who have so worthily played their Indian part.

He was District Grand Master of Bengal at the District Grand Lodge of Bengal from 1908 to 1911.

He retired to London, as was normal for luminaries of the British Raj, and is buried in East Sheen Cemetery alongside his wife, Lady Anne Stanley (d. 1 May 1946).

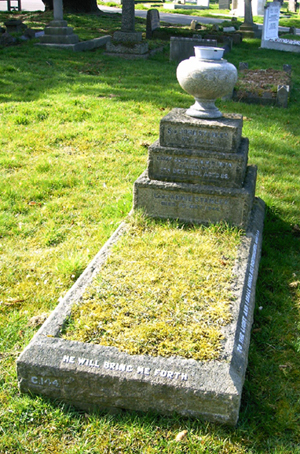
Sir & Lady John Stanley, East Sheen Cemetery, London
