= Indian Red Cross Society =

Indian humanitarian organization to protect human life and health

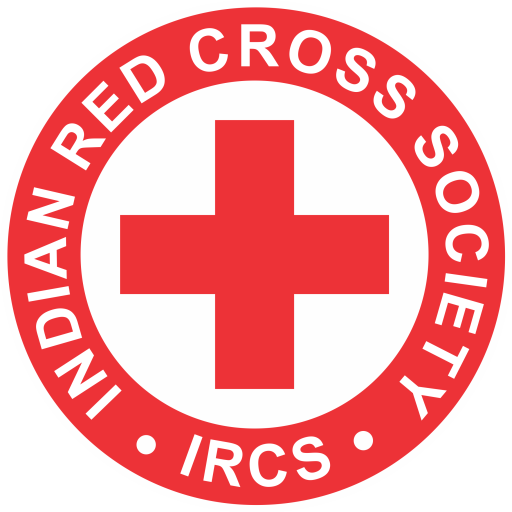
- Abbreviation: IRCS
- Formation: 1920; 106 years ago
- Legal status: Active
- Purpose: Medical & Humanitarian
- Headquarters: New Delhi, India
- Location: New Delhi
- Region served: India
- Website: Indian Red Cross Society official website

The Indian Red Cross Society (IRCS) is a voluntary humanitarian organization to protect human life and health based in India. It is part of the International Red Cross and Red Crescent Movement and shares the Fundamental Principles of the International Red Cross and Red Crescent Movement. The society's mission is to provide relief in times of disasters/emergencies and promote health and care of vulnerable people and communities. It has a network of over 700 branches throughout India. The Society uses the Red Cross as an emblem in common with other international Red Cross societies. Volunteering has been at the very heart of the Indian Red Cross Society since its inception in 1920, with the Society having Youth and Junior volunteering programmes. The Society is closely associated with St John Ambulance India.

== History ==
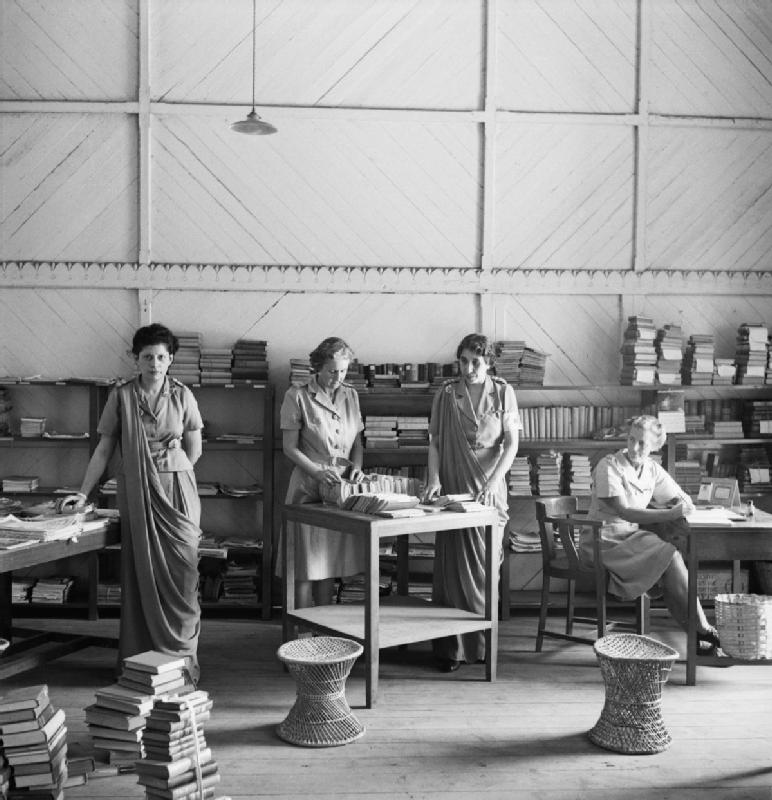
Sorting out books for dispatch to troops in Burma during World War II

During the First World War relief services for affected soldiers in India was provided by a branch of the Joint War Committee, a collaboration between the St John Ambulance Association and the British Red Cross. On 3 March 1920, a bill was introduced to the Indian Legislative Council by Sir Claude Hill (a member of the Viceroy's Executive Council who was also Chairman of the Joint War Committee in India) to constitute the Indian Red Cross Society, independent of the British Red Cross. The Bill was passed as the Indian Red Cross Society Act, 1920 on 17 March 1920, and became Parliament Act XV of 1920 with the assent of the Governor General on the 20 March 1920.

On 7 June 1920 fifty members were formally nominated to constitute the Indian Red Cross Society from members of the Indian branch of the Joint War Committee. The first managing body was elected from among them with Sir William Malcolm Hailey as chairman.

=== Red Cross parcels ===
PoW parcels supplied by the Indian Red Cross Society during WW2 contained:

- 8 ounces fruit in syrup
- 16 ounces lentils
- 2 ounces toilet soap
- 16 ounces flour
- 8 biscuits
- 8 ounces margarine
- 12 ounces Nestlé's Milk
- 14 ounces rice
- 16 ounces pilchards
- 2 ounces curry powder
- 8 ounces sugar
- 1 ounce dried eggs
- 2 ounces tea
- 1 ounce salt
- 4 ounces chocolate

=== Post War ===
In 1947 some of the IRCS assets were provided to found the Pakistan Red Cross Society, now the Pakistan Red Crescent Society.

The act governing the IRCS was last amended by The Indian Red Cross Society (Amendment) Bill, 1992.

== Organisation ==
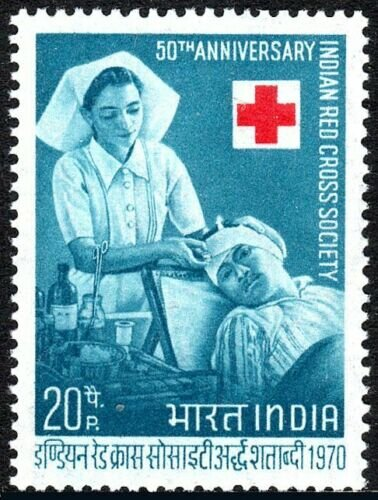
Stamp of India 1970, 50th Anniversary of Indian Red Cross

- The IRCS has 36 state / union territories branches with their more than 700 districts and sub district branches.
- President of India is the president of the IRCS
- The chairman of the society is nominated by the president for a term they fit, by convention the Minister of Health and Family Welfare is the chairman of the society.
- The National Managing Body consists of 18 members including the chairman.
- The chairman and 6 members of the managing body are nominated by the president with a term set by the president. The remaining 12 are elected by the state and union territory branches for a term of 2 years through an electoral college.
- The vice chairman is elected by the members of the managing body.
- The managing body is responsible for governance and supervision of the functions of the society through a number of committees.
- The secretary general is the chief executive of the society.

== List of secretaries general of the Indian Red Cross Society ==
No.	Secretary general	Start of term	End of term
1	Balwant Singh Puri	July 1941	July 1958
2	Maj. Gen. C. K. Lakshmanan	July 1958	April 1969
3	Maj. Gen. S. S. Maitra	July 1969	October 1978
4	Lt. Gen. R. S. Hoon	October 1978	July 1981
5	Ajit Bhowmick	July 1981	January 1991
(5)	Ajit Bhowmick (2nd term)	April 1991	June 1991
6	Dr. A. K. Mukherjee	November 1991	March 1996
7	Dr. Manoj Mathur	April 1996	March 1999
8	Dr. S. P. Agarwal	March 1999	February 2000
9	Dr. Vimala Ramalingam	March 2000	March 2006
(8)	Dr. S. P. Agarwal (2nd term)	March 2005	2015 November 2015
10	R. K. Jain	November 2015	Incumbent

== See also ==
- List of Red Cross and Red Crescent Societies
- International Red Cross and Red Crescent Movement
- International Federation of Red Cross and Red Crescent Societies
- Emblems of the International Red Cross and Red Crescent Movement
- Johanniter International
