= Cheruvari Lakshmanan =

Indian sportsman

Cheruvari Kottieth "C. K." Lakshmanan (5 April 1898 – 3 October 1970) was an Indian sportsman and activist. He represented British India in the 1924 Summer Olympics held in Paris. He participated in the hurdles event but did not win a medal.

Part of the eight-member Indian contingent that represented the country at the 1924 Olympics, Lakshmanan was the first Malayali to participate in an Olympic event. In the same year, he won gold in the 120-yard hurdles at the first National Athletic Meet in Delhi in 1924. He also played cricket at the first-class level between 1925–26 and 1930–31.

Lakshmanan later served in the Indian Army as a major general and subsequently as the director-general of the Indian Red Cross Society. He died on 3 October 1970 in New Delhi.

== See also ==
List of Kerala Olympians
