= Henry George Richards =

British Indian Judge

Sir Henry George Richards

8th Chief Justice of Allahabad High Court
- In office 21 April 1911 – 28 October 1919
- Appointed by: George V
- Preceded by: John Stanley
- Succeeded by: Edward Grimwood Mears

Judge of Allahabad High Court
- In office 1905 – 20 April 1911
- Appointed by: Edward VII

Personal details
- Born: 22 September 1860 Kilmacanogue, County Wicklow, Ireland
- Died: 1919 (aged 58–59)
- Education: Trinity College Dublin (M.A)
- Profession: Barrister, Judge

Henry George Richards (22 September 1860 – 1919) was a British Indian Judge who served as the Chief Justice of the Allahabad High Court.

== Career ==
Richards was born on 22 September 1860 at Kilmacanogue, County Wicklow, Ireland. He was the son of John Henry Richards, a county court judge. He was educated at Maidenhead and Trinity College Dublin, where he obtained a Master of Arts degree. He was called to the King's Inns in 1883. Richards practised on the Connaught Circuit. He served as Senior Crown Prosecutor for the counties of Roscommon and Mayo. After coming in British India, he held a military position as commanding officer, with the rank of lieutenant-colonel, of the Allahabad Volunteer Rifle Corps. Richards was appointed a judge of the Allahabad High Court in 1905 thereafter served as Chief Justice of this High Court after Sir John Stanley. He was also the Vice-Chancellor of the University of Allahabad from 1909 to 1912.
