= Telangana Martyrs Memorial =

Monument for students who died in the 1969 Telangana agitation

- Amaraveerula Stupam
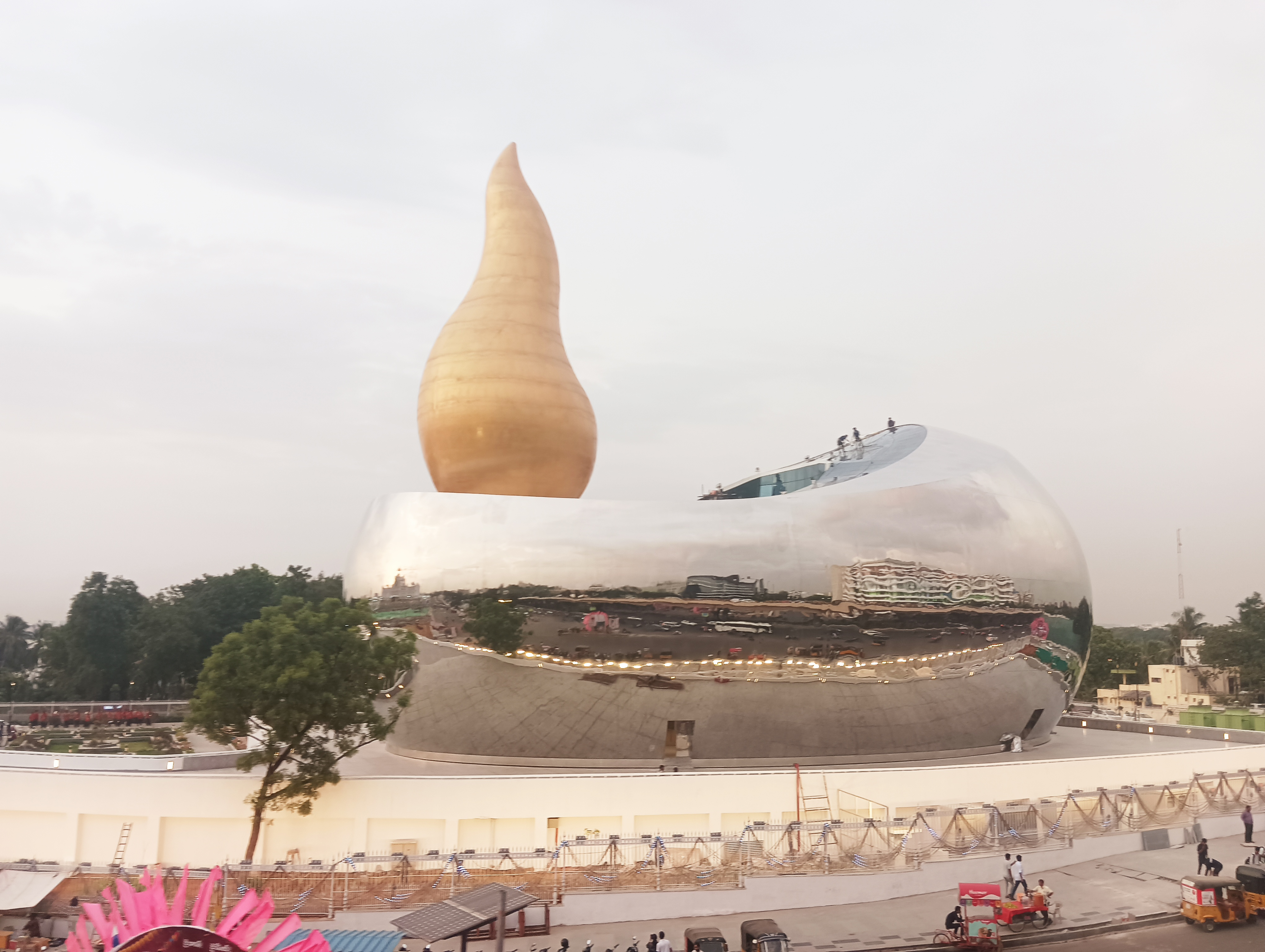
- Telangana Martyrs Memorial
- Location: Tankbund, Hyderabad
- Designer: MV Ramana Reddy
- Material: Stainless Steel
- Completion date: 2023
- Opening date: 22 June 2023; 2 years ago

Telangana Martyrs Memorial or Telangana Amara Jyothi or Amaraveerula Stupam is a monument built for 369 students who died during the 1969 agitation for a separate Telangana state. Telangana Martyrs Memorial day is observed on 2 June every year in all the districts of Telangana State. It is situated on the banks of Hussain Sagar, opposite to the Public Gardens, Hyderabad. It is the largest seamless stainless-steel memorial built in the world and is five times bigger than Cloud Gate (located in Chicago).

== History ==
The monument, also called Gun Park, because the government used guns against demonstrators and killed 369 people. It is symbolic structure celebrating brave Telangana agitators. It is a focus for political activity highlighting issues relating to the Telangana region. It was inaugurated by Chief Minister of Telangana, K. Chandrashekar Rao on 22 June 2023.

== After Telangana Formation ==
After the formation of Telangana State, the first Chief Minister of Telangana, K. Chandrashekar Rao decided to observe Telangana Martyrs Memorial Day on 2 June every year in all the districts of Telangana State. On this occasion, there will be official programmes in every district headquarters which include paying floral tributes at the designated sites of Martyrs Memorials besides other programmes in a befitting manner.

== Design influences ==
The monument was designed and built by Aekka Yadagiri Rao, a "nationally acclaimed sculptor," and former JNTU Professor of Sculpture. The Municipal Corporation of Hyderabad, Mayor Lakshminarayana, commissioned the monument, chosen from a number of possible sculptors, including Khairuddin Siddique, R B Raju, and Chawla.

The memorial is 25 feet (7.6 m) high, and incorporates five separate sections.

Base is black polished granite, which has nine bullet impressions (small holes) on four sides to represent the 360 odd (9x4) students, who sacrificed their lives for the cause in 1969. To represent 9 districts of Telangana, there were nine bullet impressions on each side. The reason for choosing black colored granite was to express mourning to the heroes. Originally, Telangana consisted of 9 districts and Ranga Reddy district was formed much later. So, when the sculptor designed the memorial, he considered 9 districts.

The mythological sun-arch above the base was inspired from Sanchi Stupas. The plaques embossed in it on four sides represent the greatness of the cause. Normally this type of plaque is placed on the head of the gods like Balaji, which means that they are Puja Arhulu. A few lines below the plaque and paid respects to Telangana martyrs, to convey that the martyrs were up there at highest level with their sacrifices.

Above the sun-arch, nine strips or columns were carved denoting nine districts of Telangana. The specialty of this art piece is one can spot these nine strips from any side view. The meaning conveyed through it was nine districts of Telangana were united and nobody can disintegrate them.

Next is the trapezium structure that has a dharma chakra, representing tolerance and truth, on four sides. The red granite represents sacrifice and the chakra for peace and love. The meaning conveyed through this was that Telangana youths sacrificed their lives while fighting for dharma, rights and justice.

At the top, sculptor carved white lily flower to symbolize the freshness of youth and immortality of the soul. Normally flowers are kept near memorials. Yadagiri Roa said, "Fresh flowers were placed at the martyrs statue regularly. I realized that instead of depending on others, why not make a flower myself and keep at the statue forever. Therefore, I carved a white lily flower and placed it on top of the memorial".1969 movement symbolic structure gun park in Hyderabad.

== Gallery ==
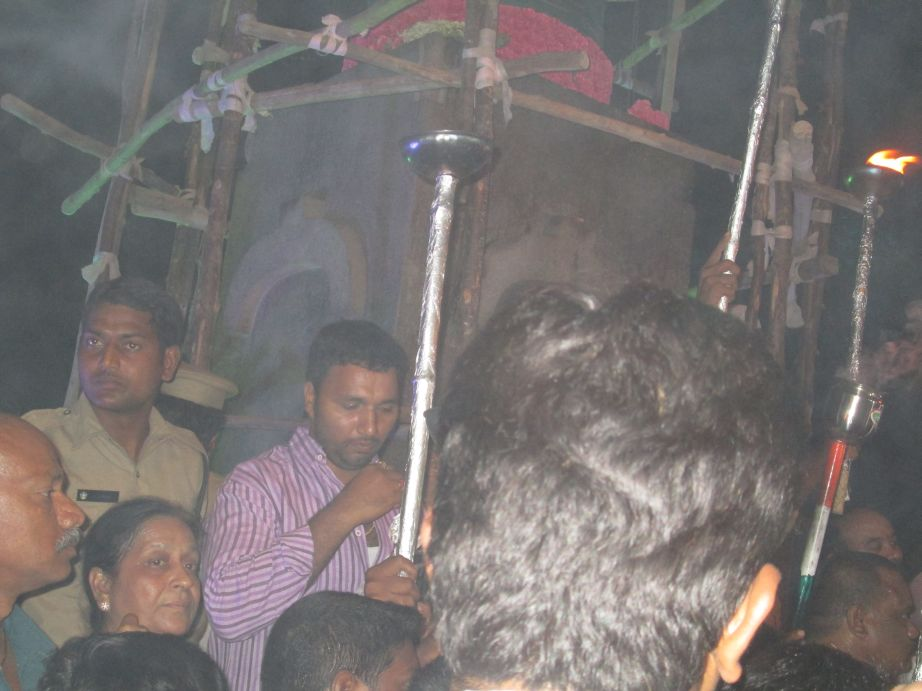
Lighting torch at Telangana Martyrs Memorial in connection with Telangana State formation in June 2014

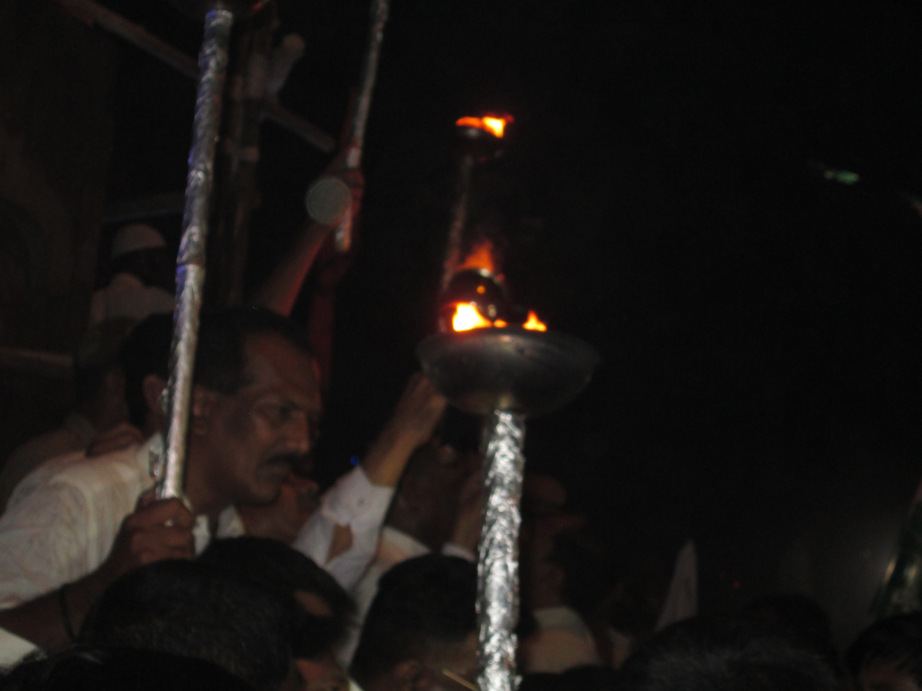
Lighting torch at Telangana Martyrs Memorial in connection with Telangana State formation in June 2014

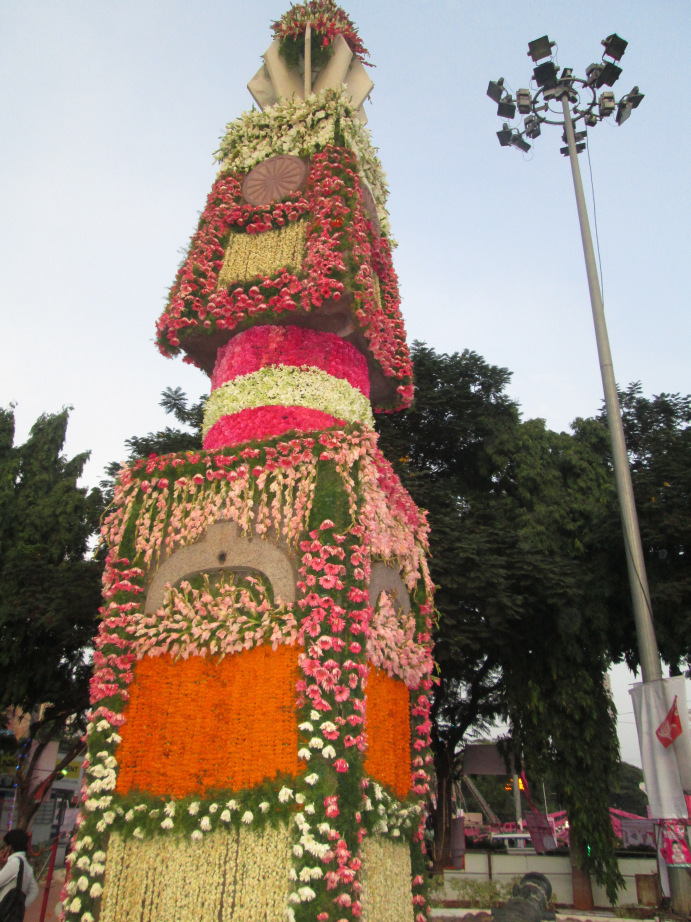
Gun Park on Telangana Formation Day

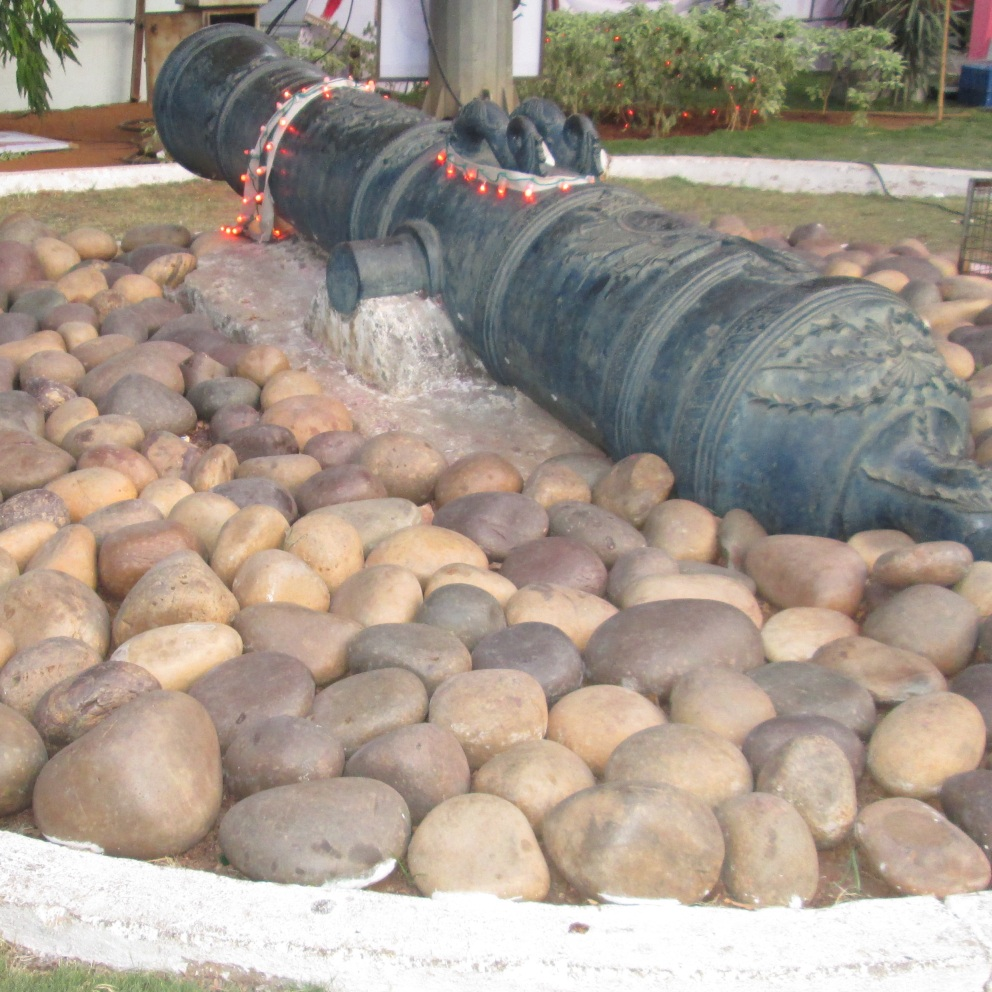
Illuminated mud cannon at Telangana Martyrs Memorial as part of Telangana state celebrations

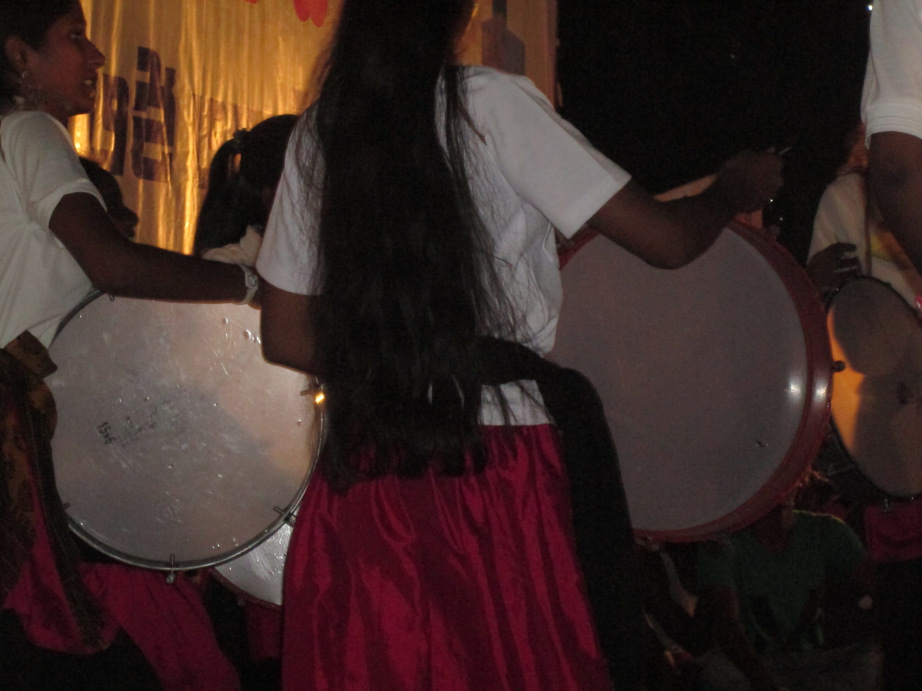
Girls drumming and dancing at Telangana Martyrs Memorial as part of Telangana state formation celebrations.

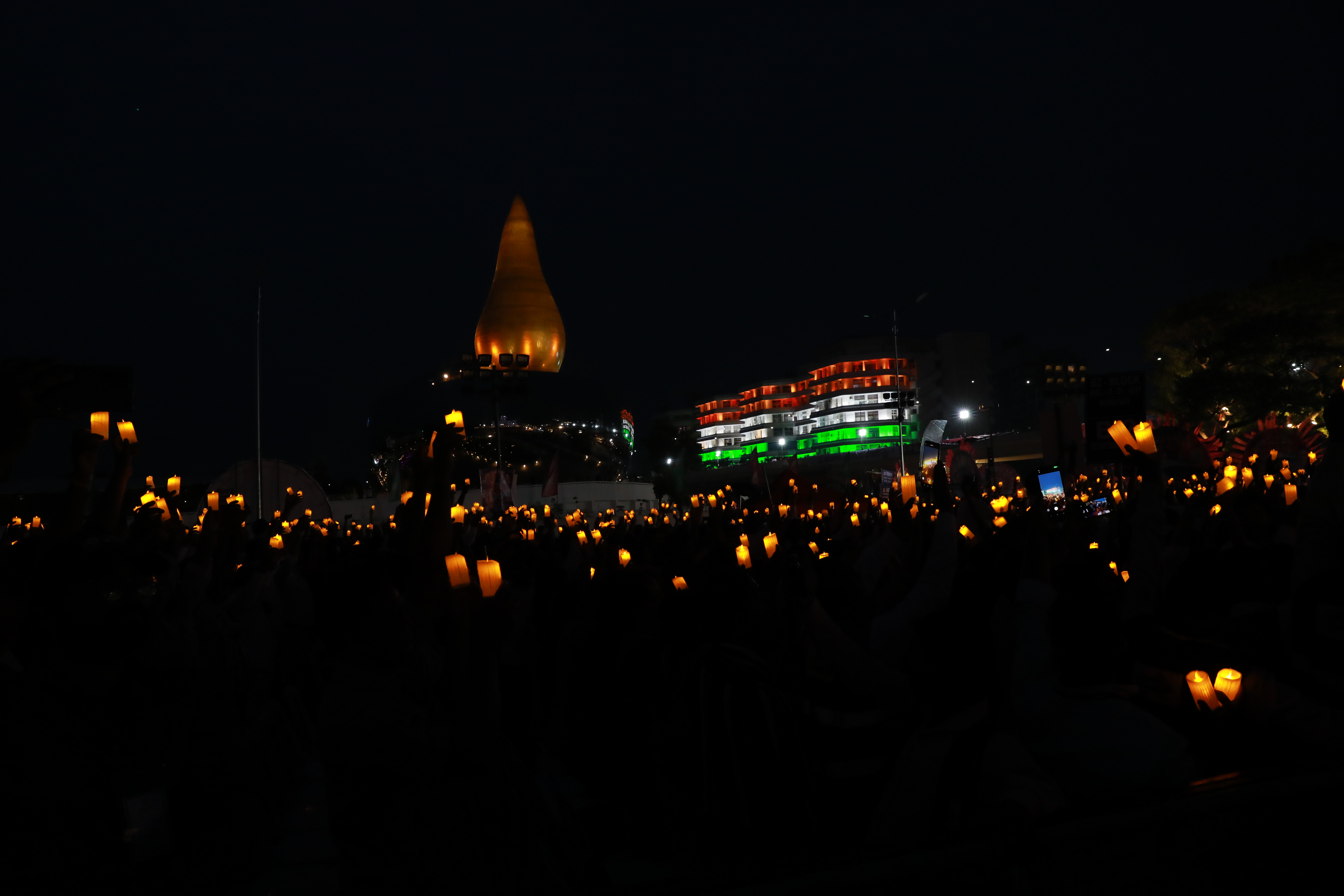
Candle Light Tribute at Telangana Martyrs Memorial
