= Satish Chandra (judge) =

Indian Judge

Satish Chandra (1 September 1924—24 January 2000) was an Indian judge who served as the Chief Justice of the Calcutta High Court.

== Early life and education ==
Satish Chandra's father Chandra Bhan Agarwala was also a Justice of the Allahabad High Court. After completion of study in Allahabad, he started parctise in Allahabad High Court on civil, constitution and revenue matters. On 7 October 1963 he became an additional judge of the Allahabad High Court. In 1978 he was elevated to the post of Chief Justice of this High Court after Justice D.M. Chandrashekhar. On 29 November 1983 he was appointed as the Chief Justice of the Calcutta High Court. Justice Chandra retired on 1 September 1986. For a brief tenure he also served as the acting Governor of West Bengal.
