= Arthur Strachey =

British Indian judge (1858-1901)

Sir Arthur Strachey

6th Chief Justice of Allahabad High Court
- In office 12 November 1898 – 14 May 1901
- Appointed by: Queen Victoria
- Preceded by: Louis Addin Kershaw
- Succeeded by: John Stanley

Judge of Bombay High Court
- In office 1895 – 11 November 1898
- Appointed by: Queen Victoria

Personal details
- Born: 5 December 1858 Calcutta, British India
- Died: 14 May 1901 (aged 42) Simla, British India
- Parent(s): John Strachey and Katherine Jane Batten
- Education: Trinity Hall, Cambridge

Sir Arthur Strachey (5 December 1858 – 14 May 1901) was a British Indian judge and Chief Justice of Allahabad High Court.

== Early life ==
Strachey was born in Calcutta, British India to Sir John Strachey and Katherine Jane Batten. He was educated at Uppingham and afterwards at Charterhouse. He graduated from Trinity Hall, Cambridge in 1880 with second class in the Law Tripos. He got the LL.B. degree and was called to the bar from the Inner Temple in 1883.

== Career ==
Strachey returned to British India and started practice at Allahabad High Court at Allahabad. In 1892, he became public prosecutor and standing counsel to the Provincial Government. In 1895 Strachey became a judge of the Bombay High Court. He presided at the first trial for sedition case of Bal Gangadhar Tilak in 1897. On 12 November 1898, he was appointed Chief Justice of the Allahabad High Court and knighted on 30 January 1899. He died on 14 May 1901 in Simla while still being chief justice of Allahabad High Court.
