= Sunil Ambwani =

Indian jurist (born 1953)

Justice Sunil Ambwani

Chief Justice of Rajasthan High Court
- In office 24 March 2015 – 22 August 2015
- Preceded by: Amitava Roy
- Succeeded by: Ajit Singh

Justice of Allahabad High Court

Personal details
- Born: 23 August 1953 (age 73)
- Education: University of Allahabad

Sunil Ambwani (born 1953) is a retired Indian judge. He served as Chief Justice of the Rajasthan High Court and former Justice of the Allahabad High Court.

== Early life ==
In 1975, Ambwani graduated from the University of Allahabad with a first-class honours degree in law.

== Attorney ==
Ambwani enrolled as an advocate on 8 April 1976. He practised at Allahabad High Court from 1976 to 1985, and again from 1992 to 2001. He practised at the Supreme Court of India on civil and constitutional cases from 1985 to 1992. He cleared the Advocate-on-Record examination in 1986 and became a life member of India's Supreme Court Advocates-on-Record Association. He served as Special Counsel in High Court from 1998 to 2001.

== Judiciary ==
Ambwani was made a permanent judge in April 2001. In his judicial career, he held the position of chairman at Allahabad High Court Mediation and Conciliation Centre, High Court and State Mediation Monitoring Committee; chairman at Computerization Committee, High Court and State e-Court Steering Committee; and Executive Chairman of U.P. State Legal Services Authority.

In July 2014, Ambwani was transferred to Rajasthan High Court and was appointed acting Chief Justice later that year in August. In March 2015, he was appointed Chief Justice of the Rajasthan High Court.
