= Kunwar Bahadur Asthana =

Indian politician and judge

K. B. Asthana

Member of Rajya Sabha
- In office 14 July 1977 – 2 April 1980
- Constituency: Uttar Pradesh

Chief Justice of Allahabad High Court
- In office 1974–1977

Personal details
- Born: Kunwar Bahadur Asthana; 9 May 1915
- Died: Unknown
- Party: Janata Party

Kunwar Bahadur Asthana (born 9 May 1915, died ?) was an Indian politician and Chief Justice. He was a Member of Parliament, representing Uttar Pradesh in the Rajya Sabha the upper house of India's Parliament as a member of the Janata Party. He was Chief Justice of Allahabad High Court from 1974 to 1980.
