= St John Ambulance India =

St. John Ambulance India is the first aid, ambulance and nursing wing of the Indian Red Cross Society. It arose as the local Indian branch of the international St. John Ambulance movement headquartered in the United Kingdom, but in the years since Indian independence it has severed official links with the Order of St John. It has its national headquarters in Delhi and operates as a federation. There are two operational wings often called the Association Wing (which delivers first aid training) and the Brigade Wing (which delivers First Aid at public events).

St John Ambulance India is made up of: 23 State centres, 9 railway centres, 3 Union centres and over 670 regional, district and local centres of the Association. 29 districts comprising over 2,400 divisions and corps where St John volunteers are trained to deliver First Aid.

Primarily, St John Ambulance India delivers First Aid training and in 2010, St John India trained a total of 229,372 adults in First Aid as well as 2,593 children and young people and treated a total of 216,697 patients throughout the year.

== Background ==
Surgeon-Major William George Nicholas Manley of the Royal Regiment of Artillery established St John Ambulance in 1873. In 1912, the St John Ambulance Association was granted autonomy and the Council was created. The first Nursing division was established in 1913 and the first Cadet division in 1925. Prior to 1934, St John Ambulance and the Indian Red Cross maintained separate identities although they undertook joint relief work. The two organisations became affiliated in 1934 to ensure harmonious relations between the two bodies, to avoid overlapping and to ensure that ambulance work was given its rightful place in conjunction with Red Cross responsibilities. At independence, the Indian St John Council was granted entire control over the work that was being carried out in 526 divisions.

St. John Ambulance (Parsi Ambulance Division) was first started in Bombay in 1902. St. John Ambulance activities started in Calcutta around 1905 and 1910.

St. John Ambulance National Activities started in 1912. In Bengal, when St. John Ambulance activities started, it had its units in all the districts of Bengal (including East Bengal, now Bangladesh).
