= Thakkalapalli Purushothama Rao =

Personal details
- Born: 20 March 1937 (age 89) Warangal, Hyderabad State
- Party: Indian National Congress

Thakkalapalli Purushothama Rao (born 20 March 1937) is an Indian politician. He was the cabinet minister for Roads, Buildings and Ports, Government of Andhra Pradesh from 1993 to 1994. Presently he is the Chairman for High Power Committee on Remote Interior Area Development.

== Early life and political career ==
Rao was born in an affluent royal family on 20 March 1937 in Konkapaka village of Warangal district, Hyderabad State. At twenty-five he was elected as the Wardhannapet Samithi President. Later, he was elected to the 4th and 5th assembly from Wardhannapet constituency. In 1989 he was elected from Warangal constituency. In 1969, Rao unveiled Telangana map in the state assembly and he was for outright separation during the 1969 Telangana movement and he supported the student views. In the year 1972, all candidates belonging to STPS under the leadership of M Sridhar Reddy contested the assembly elections, however, only Mr.Rao got elected from Wardhannapet constituency of Warangal District and rest were defeated.

== Peace Talks with the Maoists in 2004 ==
Rao was instrumental in persuading Y. S. Rajasekhara Reddy to have peace talks with maoists and was the government representative during the peace talks. The AICC has made him the chairman of Gandhipatham of APCC to propagate the ideals of Gandhiji, in intellectual circles he is called Gandhian Marxist

The Dr. Babasaheb Ambedkar Open University honored Rao with Doctorate in 2008 for his service to the society.
