= Dhatri Saran Mathur =

Indian justice

Dhatri Saran Mathur (Devanagari: धातृ शरण माथुर), I.C.S., (born 13 November 1912) was the former Chief Justice of the Allahabad High Court.

== Career ==
Mathur studied in Government Intermediate College of Etawah, Agra University, Thomason Civil Engineering College of Roorkee and Balliol College, Oxford. He passed Indian Civil Service on 16 September 1936 and joined in the post of Assistant Magistrate and Collector in the state of Uttar Pradesh under the British Government. In 1944 he became District and Sessions Judge. Since 17 August 1955 to 31 October 1956 he served as Judicial Commissioner of Bhopal. He was appointed Additional Judge of the Allahabad High Court in 1959. Justice Mathur was elevated in the post of Chief Justice of the Allahabad High Court on 6 November 1973. He retired from the post on 13 November 1974.
