= Allahabad High Court =

High court in the Indian state of Uttar Pradesh

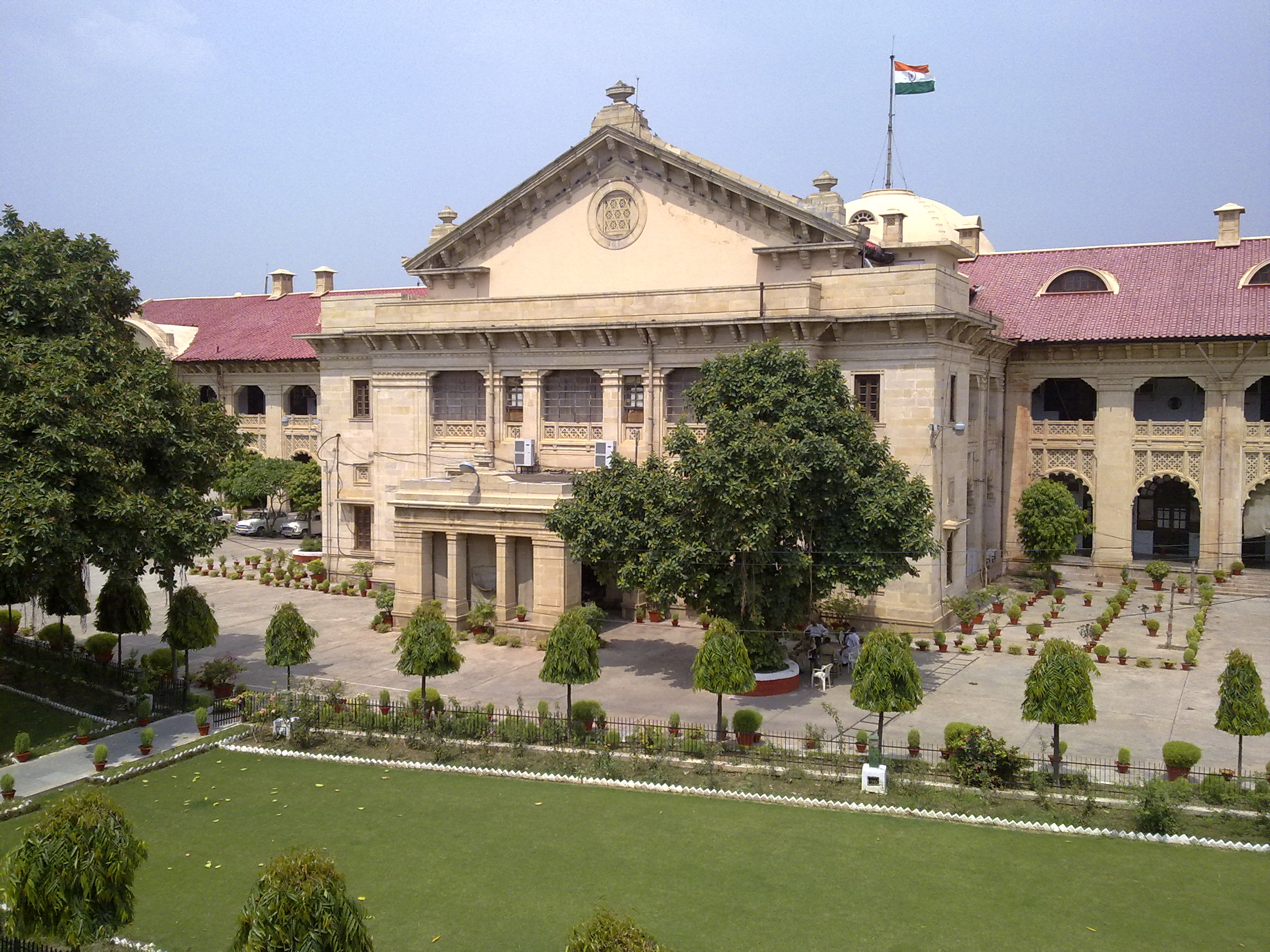
- High Court building in Allahabad
- Interactive map of Allahabad High Court
- 25°27′11″N 81°49′14″E
- Established: 17 March 1866 (in Agra); 1869 (in Allahabad)
- Jurisdiction: Uttar Pradesh
- Location: Principal Seat: Prayagraj; Permanent Bench: Lucknow
- Coordinates: 25°27′11″N 81°49′14″E
- Composition method: Presidential with confirmation of Chief Justice of India and Governor of respective state.
- Authorised by: Constitution of India
- Judge term length: mandatory retirement by age of 62
- Number of positions: 160 (permanent 76; additional 84)
- Website: allahabadhighcourt.in

Chief Justice
- Currently: Arun Bhansali
- Since: 5 February 2024

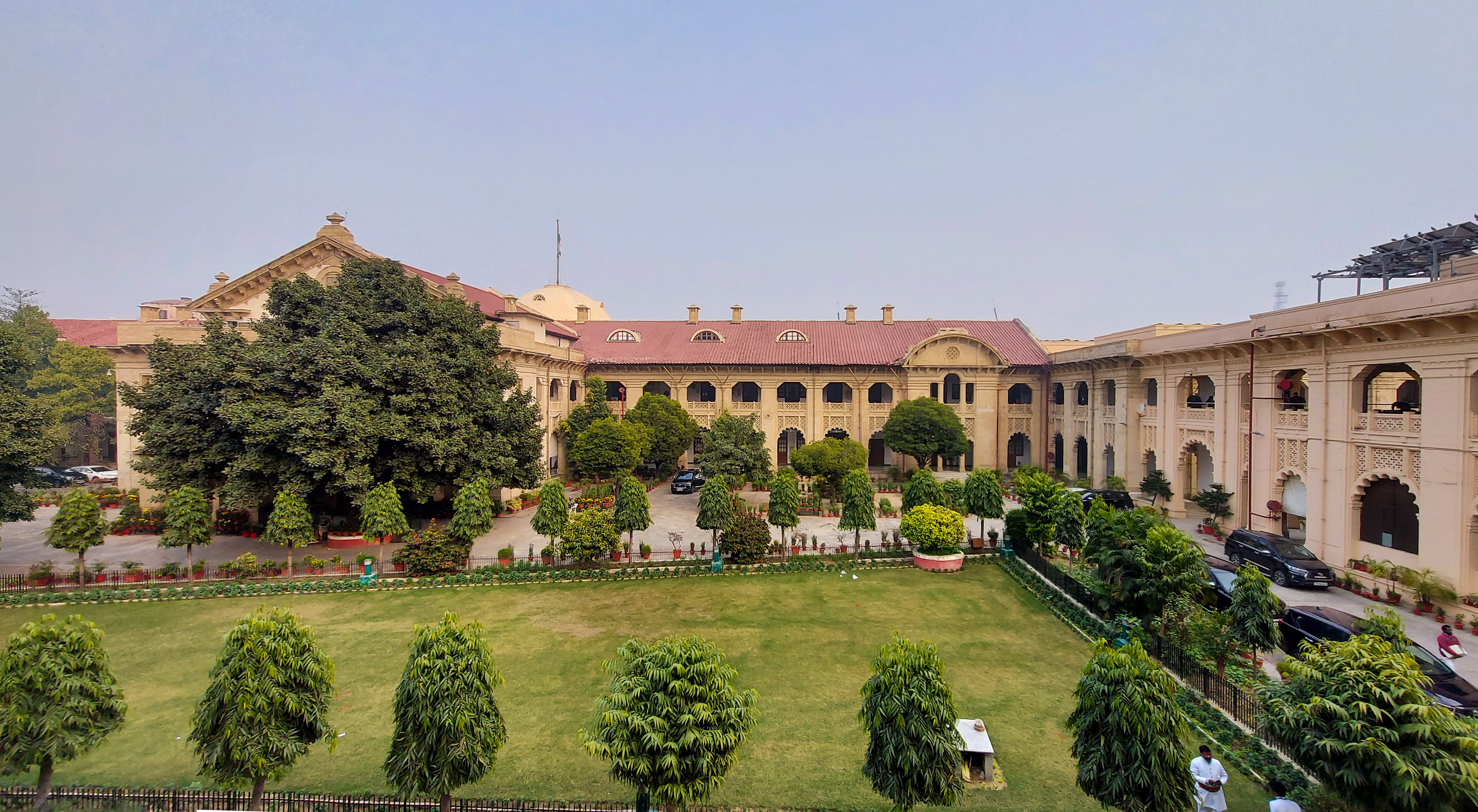
Inner block of Allahabad High Court

Allahabad High Court, officially known as High Court of Judicature at Allahabad, is the high court based in the city that used to be called Allahabad and is now known as Prayagraj, that has jurisdiction over the Indian state of Uttar Pradesh. It was established on 17 March 1866, making it one of the oldest high courts to be established in India.

== History ==
Allahabad became the seat of Government of North-Western Provinces and a High Court was established in 1834 but was shifted to Agra within a year. In 1875 it shifted back to Allahabad. The former High Court was located at the Accountant General's office at the University of Allahabad complex.

It was founded as the High Court of Judicature for the North-Western Provinces at Agra on 17 March 1866 by the Indian High Courts Act 1861 replacing the old Sadr Diwani Adalat. Sir Walter Morgan, Barrister-at-Law and Mr. Simpson were appointed the first Chief Justice and the first Registrar respectively of the High Court of North-Western Provinces.

The location of the High Court for the North-Western Provinces was moved from Agra to Allahabad in 1875 and the name was correspondingly changed to the High Court of Judicature at Allahabad from 11 March 1919.

On 2 November 1925, the Oudh Judicial Commissioner's Court was replaced by the Oudh Chief Court at Lucknow by the Oudh Civil Courts Act of 1925, enacted by the United Provinces Legislature with the previous sanction of the Governor General and the passing of this Act.

On 25 February 1948, the Chief Court of Oudh was amalgamated with the High Court of Allahabad.

Until 2000, what is now called Uttarakhand was part of Uttar Pradesh, and was therefore subject to the jurisdiction of Allahabad High Court. When the new state was created, Allahabad High Court ceased to have jurisdiction over the districts in it. The Uttarakhand High Court was established on 9 November 2000 with jurisdiction over the new state.

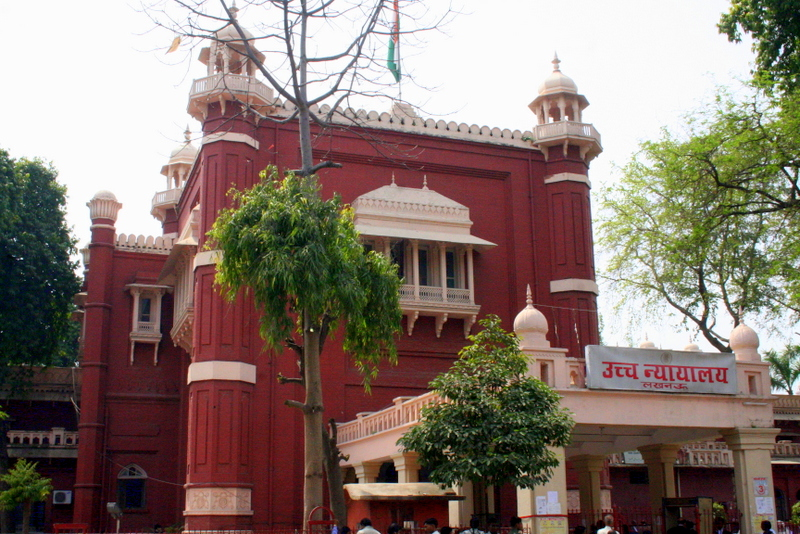
Building of the circuit bench of Allahabad High Court in Lucknow.

== Principal seat and benches ==
The seat of the court is at Prayagraj (which used to be called Allahabad). Allahabad High Court maintains a permanent circuit bench at Lucknow, the administrative capital of the state. The maximum number of serving judges is 160, the highest in India.

Location	Type	Status	No. of Sitting Judges
Prayagraj	Principal seat	Active	81
Lucknow	Bench	Active	28

=== Demand for Meerut High Court Bench ===
Residents of Western Uttar Pradesh have also been long demanding a high court bench in Meerut. Almost 54% of all cases reaching the High Court originate from the 22 districts of Western UP, still, western Uttar Pradesh does not have a High Court bench. Eight other High Courts—such as those at Delhi, Shimla, Chandigarh—are closer to litigants of West Uttar Pradesh than their own High Court in Prayagraj. In fact, Lahore High Court is closer to western Uttar Pradesh than Allahabad High Court.

== Reporting and citation ==
Journals that report Allahabad High Court Judgements include

1. Allahabad Criminal Cases,
2. Allahabad Law Journal
3. Allahabad Law Reports
4. Allahabad Daily Judgement
5. Allahabad Civil Journal
6. Allahabad Weekly Cases
7. Allahabad Rent Cases
8. Accidents Claims Journal
9. Allahabad Criminal Rulings
10. Criminal Law Journal
11. Motor Accident Claims
12. Revenue Decisions
13. U.P. Local Bodies and Education Cases
14. Lucknow Civil Decisions (LCD)
15. All India Judicial Interpretation on Crimes

=== High Court service ===
The Registry at High Court of Judicature at Allahabad is broadly divided into five Cadres:

- General office Cadre (Registrar Cadre)

An officer enters this cadre in the rank of Review Officer/Asst. Review Officer/Computer Assistant after passing a competitive exam and rises up through successive promotions on S.O./Asst./Deputy/Joint Registrar to reach the post of Registrar.

- Bench Secretary Cadre
- Private Secretary Cadre
- Computer Cadre
- Library Cadre

Some other cadres/posts at High Court of Judicature at Allahabad are:

- Chief Documentation Officer cum Chief Librarian (currently held by Sri. Amitabh Saran)
- Physiotherapist
- Court Manager

=== Commemorative postal stamps ===
Commemorative stamps released by India Post:

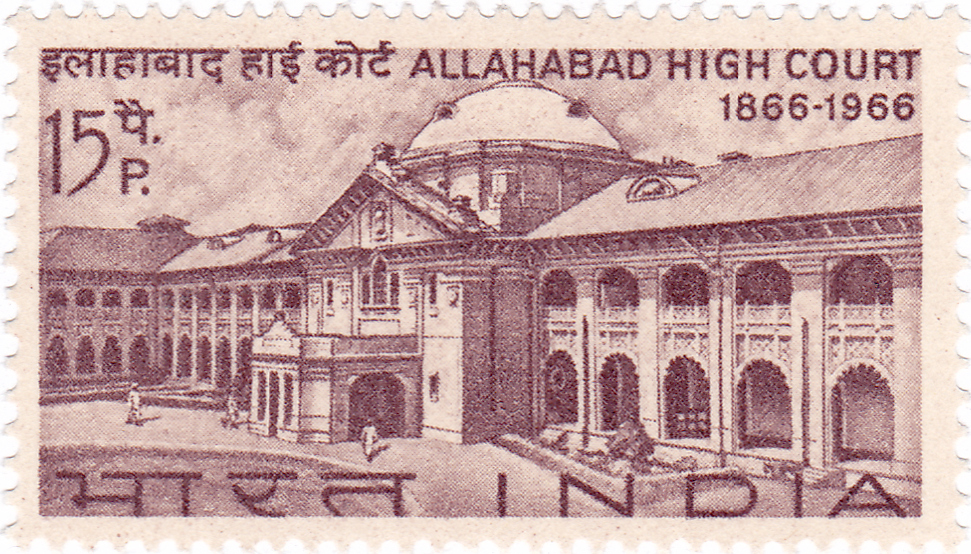
1966

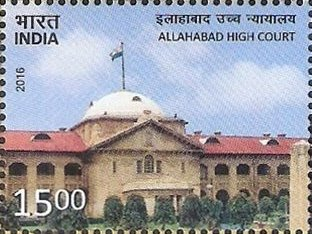
2016

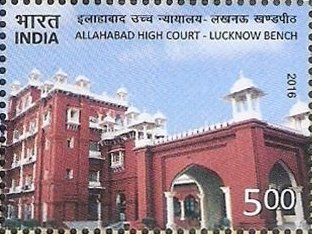
2016

== Composition ==
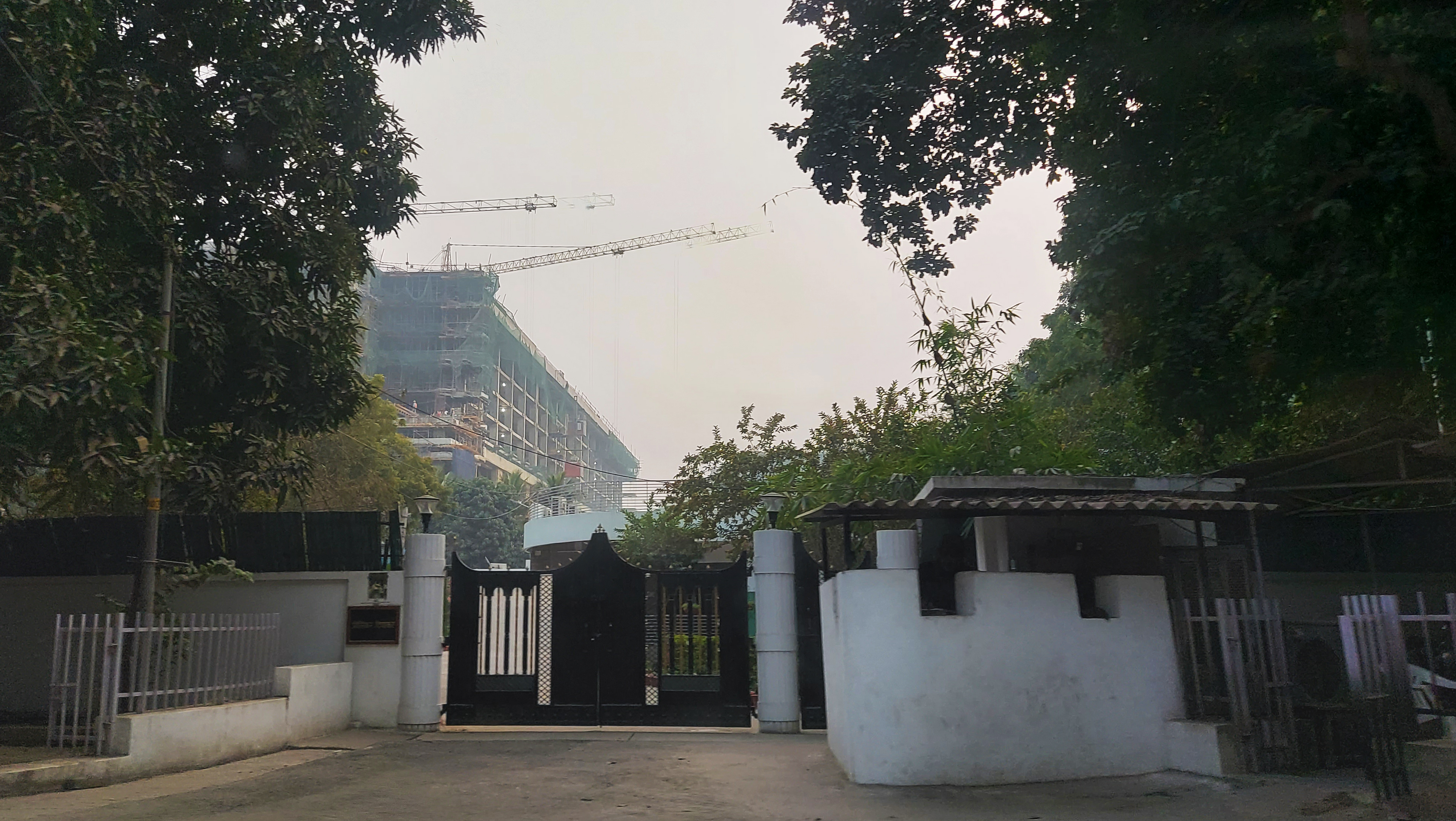
Official residence of the Chief Justice

The court has a Sanctioned strength of 160 (120 permanent, 40 additional) judges. Justice Arun Bhansali is the current Chief Justice of the High Court.

=== Former Chief Justices ===
#	Chief Justice		Portrait	Term start	Term end	Governor (oathed by)
#	English	Hindi	Portrait	Term start	Term end	Governor (oathed by)
1	Walter Morgan	वॉल्टर मॉर्गन		1866	1871	
2	Robert Stuart	रॉबर्ट स्टुअर्ट		1871	1884	
3	William Comer Petheram	विलियम कॉमर पेथरम		1884	1886	
4	John Edge	जॉन ऍज		1886	1898	
5	Louis Addin Kershaw	लूइस ऐडिन केर्शॉ		1898		
6	Arthur Strachey	आर्थर स्ट्रैची		1898	1901	
7	John Stanley	जॉन स्टैनली		1901	1911	
8	Henry George Richards	हेन्री जॉर्ज रिचर्ड्ज़		1911	1919	
9	Edward Grimwood Mears	एडवर्ड ग्रिमवुड मेयर्ज़		1919	1932	
10	Shah Muhammad Sulaiman	शाह मुहम्मद सुलेमान		1932	1937	
11	John Gibb Thom	जॉन गिब थॉम		1937	1941	
12	Iqbal Ahmad	इक़बाल अहमद		1941	1946	
13	Kamalkanta Verma	कमलकांत वर्मा		1946	1947	
After Independence
14	Bidhu Bhushan Malik	विधू भूषण मलिक		1947	1955	Sarojini Naidu
15	Orby Howell Mootham	ओ. एच. मूथम		1955	1961	Kanhaiyalal Maneklal Munshi
16	Manulal Chunilal Desai	मनुलाल चुन्नीलाल देसाई		1961	1966	Burgula Ramakrishna Rao
17	Vashishtha Bhargava	वशिष्ठ भार्गव		25 February 1966	7 August 1966	Bishwanath Das
18	Mirza Nasirullah Beg	नसीरुल्लाह बेग़		1966	1967	Bishwanath Das
19	Vidyadhar Govind Oak	विद्याधर गोविन्द ओक		1967	1971	Bezawada Gopala Reddy
20	Shashi Kanta Verma	शशिकांत वर्मा		1971	1973	Bezawada Gopala Reddy
21	Dhatri Saran Mathur	धातृ शरण माथुर		1973	1974	Akbar Ali Khan
22	Kunwar Bahadur Asthana	कुँवर बहादुर अस्थाना		1974	1977	Marri Chenna Reddy
23	Deshmudre Mallappa Chandrashekhar	डी. एम. चंद्रशेखर		1977	1978	Ganpatrao Devji Tapase
24	Satish Chandra	सतीश चंद्र		1978	1983	Ganpatrao Devji Tapase
25	Mahesh Narain Shukla	महेश नारायण शुक्ल		1983	1985	Chandeshwar Prasad Narayan Singh
26	Hridai Narain Seth	हृदय नारायण सेठ		1986		Mohammed Usman Arif
27	Kalmanje Jagannatha Shetty	कलमञ्जे जगन्नाथ शेट्टी		1986	1987	Mohammed Usman Arif
28	Dwarka Nath Jha	द्वारकानाथ झा		1987		Mohammed Usman Arif
29	Amitav Banerji	अमिताभ बनर्जी		1987	1988	Mohammed Usman Arif
30	Brahma Nath Katju	ब्रह्मनाथ काटजू		1988	1989	Mohammed Usman Arif
31	Benjaram Pranaya Jeevan Reddy	बी. पी. जीवन रेड्डी		1990	1991	B. Satya Narayan Reddy
32	Manoj Kumar Mukherjee	मनोज कुमार मुखर्जी		1991	1993	B. Satya Narayan Reddy
33	Sarvinder Singh Sodhi	एस. एस. सोढ़ी		1994	1995	Motilal Vora
34	Ambati Lakshman Rao	ए. लक्ष्मण राव		1995	1996	Motilal Vora
35	Debi Priya Mohapatra	डी. पी. महापात्र		1996	1998	Motilal Vora
36	Nirendra Krishna Mitra	एन. के. मित्र		1999	2000	Suraj Bhan
37	Shyamal Kumar Sen	श्यामल कुमार सेन		8 May 2000	24 November 2002	Suraj Bhan
38	Tarun Chatterjee	तरुण चटर्जी		31 January 2003	26 August 2004	Vishnu Kant Shastri
39	Ajoy Nath Ray	अजय नाथ राय		11 January 2005	26 January 2007	T. V. Rajeswar
40	Hemant Laxman Gokhale	हेमंत लक्ष्मण गोखले		7 March 2007	8 March 2009	T. V. Rajeswar
41	Chandramauli Kumar Prasad	चंद्रमौली कुमार प्रसाद		20 March 2009	7 February 2010	T. V. Rajeswar
42	Ferdino Rebello	फ़र्डिनो रिबेलो		26 June 2010	30 July 2011	Banwari Lal Joshi
43	Syed Rafat Alam	सय्यद रफ़ात आलम		4 August 2011	8 August 2012	Banwari Lal Joshi
44	Shiva Kirti Singh	शिवा कीर्ति सिंह		17 October 2012	18 September 2013	Banwari Lal Joshi
45	Dhananjaya Yeshwant Chandrachud	धनञ्जय यशवंत चंद्रचूड़		31 October 2013	12 May 2016	Banwari Lal Joshi
46	Dilip Babasaheb Bhosale	दिलीप बाबासाहेब भोसले		30 July 2016	23 October 2018	Ram Naik
47	Govind Mathur	गोविन्द माथुर		14 November 2018	13 April 2021	Ram Naik
48	Sanjay Yadav	संजय यादव		14 April 2021	26 June 2021	Anandiben Patel
49	Rajesh Bindal	राजेश बिंदल		11 October 2021	12 February 2023	Anandiben Patel
50	Pritinker Diwaker	प्रीतिंकर दिवाकर		26 March 2023	21 November 2023	Anandiben Patel
51	Arun Bhansali	अरुण भंसाली		5 February 2024	Incumbent	Anandiben Patel

== Judges elevated as Chief Justices ==
This sections contains list of only those judges elevated as chief justices whose parent high court is Allahabad. This includes those judges who, at the time of appointment as chief justice, may not be serving in Allahabad High Court but this list does not include judges who at the time of appointment as chief justice were serving in Allahabad High Court but does not have Allahabad as their Parent High Court.

Colour Key

- Female Chief Justice
- Served as Chief Justice of India

Symbol Key

- ^{‡} Elevated to Supreme Court of India
- ^{RES} Resigned
- ^{†} Died in office

Name	Image	Appointed as CJ in HC of	Date of appointment		Date of retirement (Note: this includes date of resignation, death and elevation to supreme court)	Tenure	
Name	Image	Appointed as CJ in HC of	As Judge	As Chief Justice	Date of retirement	As Chief Justice	As Judge (Note: also includes tenure as Chief Justice)
Charles Arthur Turner		Madras	17 March 1866	3 March 1879	July 1885		
Henry George Richards		Allahabad	1905	21 April 1911	28 October 1919	8 years, 191 days	
Edward Maynard Des Champs Chamier		Patna	1910	1 March 1916	30 October 1917	1 year, 244 days	
Shah Muhammad Sulaiman		Allahabad	1923	16 March 1932	30 September 1937^{[‡]} (Note: Then Federal Court of India)	5 years, 199 days	
Birjor Dalal		Jammu & Kashmir	1925	16 February 1931	23 November 1936	5 years, 282 days	
John Douglas Young		Lahore	1929	7 May 1934	1943		
Iqbal Ahmad		Allahabad	1932	21 July 1941	16 September 1946	5 years, 58 days	
Arthur Trevor Harries		Patna, transferred to Lahore then to Calcutta	1934	10 October 1938	12 June 1952	13 years, 247 days	
Rachpal Singh		Jammu & Kashmir	1934	13 August 1940	6 March 1942	1 year, 206 days	
Ganga Nath		Jammu & Kashmir	1937	24 June 1942	23 October 1945	3 years, 122 days	
Kamalkanta Verma		Allahabad, transferred to Rajasthan (Note: Then known as High Court of princely state of Udaipur)	1937	17 September 1946	24 January 1950	3 years, 130 days	
Bidhu Bhushan Malik		Allahabad	13 March 1944	15 October 1947	11 January 1955	7 years, 89 days	10 years, 305 days
Orby Howell Mootham		Allahabad	22 July 1946	12 January 1955	16 February 1961	6 years, 36 days	14 years, 210 days
Kailas Nath Wanchoo		Rajasthan	17 February 1947	2 January 1951	10 August 1958^{[‡]}	7 years, 221 days	11 years, 175 days
Manulal Chunilal Desai		Allahabad	13 December 1948	17 February 1961	24 February 1966	5 years, 8 days	17 years, 74 days
Vashishtha Bhargava		Allahabad	1 August 1949	25 February 1966	7 August 1966^{[‡]}	164 days	17 years, 7 days
Mirza Nasirullah Beg		Allahabad	1 June 1951	24 September 1966	3 June 1967	253 days	16 years, 3 days
Gopalji Mehrotra		Gauhati	6 May 1954	30 June 1961	6 February 1967	5 years, 222 days	12 years, 277 days
Vidyadhar Govind Oak		Allahabad	31 March 1955	4 June 1967	18 May 1971	3 years, 349 days	16 years, 49 days
Bishambhar Dayal		Madhya Pradesh	6 May 1957	19 March 1969	13 September 1972	3 years, 179 days	15 years, 131 days
Shashi Kanta Verma		Allahabad	30 June 1958	19 May 1971	5 November 1973	2 years, 171 days	15 years, 129 days
Dhatri Saran Mathur		Allahabad	15 January 1959	6 November 1973	13 November 1974	1 year, 8 days	15 years, 303 days
Kunwar Bahadur Asthana		Allahabad	22 August 1961	13 November 1974	9 May 1977	2 years, 178 days	15 years, 261 days
Raghunandan Swarup Pathak	R. S. Pathak	Himachal Pradesh	1 October 1962	18 March 1972	19 February 1978^{[‡]}	5 years, 339 days	15 years, 142 days
Mirza Hameedullah Beg	M. H. Beg	Himachal Pradesh	11 June 1963	25 January 1971	9 December 1971^{[‡]}	319 days	8 years, 182 days
Satish Chandra		Allahabad, transferred to Calcutta	7 October 1963	22 March 1978	1 September 1986	8 years, 164 days	22 years, 330 days
Mahesh Narain Shukla		Allahabad	14 March 1969	12 April 1985	5 October 1985	177 days	16 years, 206 days
Hridai Narain Seth		Allahabad, transferred to Punjab & Haryana	7 July 1969	16 May 1986	14 October 1987	1 year, 152 days	18 years, 100 days
Tribeni Sahai Misra		Gauhati	3 September 1971	12 August 1983	14 November 1984	1 year, 95 days	13 years, 73 days
Narayan Dutt Ojha		Madhya Pradesh	3 September 1971	8 January 1987	18 January 1988^{[‡]}	1 year, 11 days	16 years, 139 days
Dwarka Nath Jha		Allahabad	6 August 1973	14 July 1987	15 July 1987	2 days	13 years, 344 days
Amitav Banerji		Allahabad	6 August 1973	26 April 1988	6 November 1988	195 days	15 years, 93 days
Brahma Nath Katju		Allahabad	6 August 1973	7 November 1988	22 May 1989	197 days	15 years, 290 days
Krishna Chandra Agarwal		Rajasthan, transferred to Calcutta	6 August 1973	15 April 1990	15 January 1996	5 years, 276 days	22 years, 163 days
Sudarshan Dayal Aggarwal		Punjab & Haryana	17 November 1977	13 November 1992	14 January 1994	1 year, 63 days	16 years, 59 days
Satish Chandra Mathur		Jammu & Kashmir	30 March 1978	10 October 1993	17 March 1994	159 days	15 years, 353 days
Viney Krishna Khanna		Gauhati	2 July 1979	24 April 1994	14 February 1997	2 years, 297 days	17 years, 228 days
Saiyed Saghir Ahmad		Jammu & Kashmir, transferred to Andhra Pradesh	2 November 1981	18 March 1994	5 March 1995^{[‡]}	353 days	13 years, 124 days
Vishweshwar Nath Khare		Calcutta	25 June 1983	2 February 1996	20 March 1997^{[‡]}	1 year, 47 days	13 years, 269 days
Ajay Prakash Misra		Delhi	24 May 1984	26 June 1997	3 December 1997^{[‡]}	161 days	13 years, 194 days
Om Prakash Verma		Kerala	24 May 1984	20 December 1997	19 March 1999	1 year, 90 days	14 years, 300 days
Brijesh Kumar		Gauhati	24 May 1984	12 February 1999	18 October 2000^{[‡]}	1 year, 250 days	16 years, 148 days
Ravi Swaroop Dhavan		Patna	9 January 1986	25 January 2000	22 July 2004	4 years, 180 days	18 years, 196 days
Daya Saran Sinha		Gujarat	17 March 1986	17 March 2002	17 March 2003	1 year, 1 day	17 years, 1 day
Markandey Katju		Madras, transferred to Delhi	30 November 1991	28 November 2004	9 April 2006^{[‡]}	1 year, 133 days	14 years, 131 days
Jagadish Bhalla		Himachal Pradesh, transferred to Rajasthan	5 April 1995	2 February 2008	31 October 2010	2 years, 272 days	15 years, 210 days
Balbir Singh Chauhan		Orissa	5 April 1995	16 July 2008	10 May 2009^{[‡]}	299 days	14 years, 36 days
Yatindra Singh		Chhattisgarh	5 February 1999	22 October 2012	8 October 2014	1 year, 352 days	15 years, 246 days
Rajesh Kumar Agrawal		Madras	5 February 1999	24 October 2013	16 February 2014^{[‡]}	116 days	15 years, 12 days
Sunil Ambwani		Rajasthan	24 April 2001	24 March 2015	22 August 2015	152 days	14 years, 121 days
Ashok Bhushan		Kerala	24 April 2001	26 March 2015	12 May 2016^{[‡]}	1 year, 48 days	15 years, 19 days
Vineet Saran		Orissa	14 February 2002	26 February 2016	6 August 2018^{[‡]}	2 years, 162 days	16 years, 174 days
Tarun Agarwala		Meghalaya	7 January 2004	12 February 2018	2 March 2018	19 days	14 years, 55 days
Krishna Murari		Punjab & Haryana	7 January 2004	2 June 2018	22 September 2019^{[‡]}	1 year, 113 days	15 years, 259 days
Amreshwar Pratap Sahi		Patna, transferred to Madras	24 September 2004	17 November 2018	31 December 2020	2 years, 45 days	16 years, 99 days
Vikram Nath		Gujarat	24 September 2004	10 September 2019	30 August 2021^{[‡]}	1 year, 355 days	16 years, 340 days
Pankaj Mithal		Jammu & Kashmir, transferred to Rajasthan	7 July 2006	4 January 2021	5 February 2023^{[‡]}	2 years, 33 days	16 years, 214 days
Ritu Raj Awasthi		Karnataka	13 April 2009	11 October 2021	2 July 2022	265 days	13 years, 81 days
Ramesh Sinha		Chhattisgarh	21 November 2011	29 March 2023	4 September 2026	3 years, 160 days	14 years, 288 days
Sunita Agarwal		Gujarat	21 November 2011	23 July 2023	5 October 2026^{[‡]}	3 years, 75 days	14 years, 319 days
Devendra Kumar Upadhyaya		Bombay, transferred to Delhi	21 November 2011	29 July 2023	5 October 2026^{[‡]}	3 years, 69 days	14 years, 319 days
Manoj Kumar Gupta		Uttarakhand	12 April 2013	10 January 2026	8 October 2026	272 days	13 years, 180 days
Mahesh Chandra Tripathi		Bombay	27 September 2013	9 September 2026	Incumbent	75 days	13 years, 57 days
Ashwani Kumar Mishra		Punjab & Haryana	3 February 2014	7 September 2026	Incumbent	77 days	12 years, 293 days

=== Judges appointed as Acting Chief Justice ===
Name	Appointed as ACJ in HC of	Date of appointment as Judge	Period as Acting Chief Justice	Date of retirement	Tenure as ACJ	Tenure as Judge	Remarks	Ref..
Iqbal Ahmad	Allahabad	1932	20 Feb 1941 – 20 Jul 1941	16 September 1946	151 days		Became permanent	
M. N. Beg	Allahabad	1 June 1951	8 Aug 1966 – 23 Sep 1966	3 June 1967	47 days	16 years, 3 days	Became permanent	
Mahesh Narain Shukla	Allahabad	14 March 1969	29 Nov 1983 – 11 Apr 1985	5 October 1985	1 year, 134 days	16 years, 206 days	Became permanent	
Hridai Narain Seth	Allahabad	7 July 1969	6 Oct 1985 – 15 May 1986	14 October 1987	222 days	18 years, 100 days	Became permanent	
N. D. Ojha	Allahabad	3 September 1971	18 Aug 1986 – 30 Sep 1986	18 January 1988^{[‡]}	44 days	16 years, 139 days	--	
Dwarka Nath Jha	Allahabad	6 August 1973	1 May 1987 – 13 Jul 1987	15 July 1987	74 days	13 years, 344 days	Became permanent	
Amitav Banerji	Allahabad	6 August 1973	16 Jul 1987 – 25 Apr 1988	6 November 1988	285 days	15 years, 93 days	Became permanent	
K. C. Agarwal	Allahabad	6 August 1973	23 May 1989 – 15 Apr 1990	15 January 1996	328 days	22 years, 163 days	Elevated as CJ of Rajasthan	
Prem Shankar Gupta	Allahabad	17 November 1977	7 Oct 1991 – 11 Nov 1991	15 July 1992	36 days	14 years, 242 days	--	
Vijaya Kumar Mehrotra	Himachal Pradesh	30 March 1978	14 Nov 1988 – 28 Mar 1989	19 October 1992	135 days	14 years, 204 days	--	
Vijaya Kumar Mehrotra	Himachal Pradesh	30 March 1978	6 Oct 1989 – 5 Nov 1989	19 October 1992	31 days	14 years, 204 days	--	
Vijaya Kumar Mehrotra	Himachal Pradesh	30 March 1978	15 Jan 1991 – 4 Aug 1991	19 October 1992	202 days	14 years, 204 days	--	
Satish Chandra Mathur	Allahabad	30 March 1978	8 Jan 1993 – 12 Oct 1993	17 March 1994	277 days	15 years, 353 days	Elevated as CJ of Jammu & Kashmir	
Viney Krishna Khanna	Allahabad	2 July 1979	13 Oct 1993 – 23 Apr 1994	14 February 1997	193 days	17 years, 228 days	Elevated as CJ of Gauhati	
V. N. Khare	Allahabad	25 June 1983	15 Jan 1996 – 1 Feb 1996	20 March 1997^{[‡]}	18 days	13 years, 269 days	Elevated as CJ of Calcutta	
B. L. Yadav	Patna	24 May 1984	6 Mar 1995 – 18 May 1995	5 April 1996	74 days	11 years, 318 days	--	
J. N. Dubey	Patna	24 May 1984	21 Mar 1997 – 8 Jul 1997	15 July 1999	110 days	15 years, 53 days	--	
Brijesh Kumar	Allahabad	24 May 1984	9 Dec 1998 – 11 Feb 1999	18 October 2000^{[‡]}	65 days	16 years, 148 days	Elevated as CJ of Gauhati	
D. S. Sinha	Allahabad	17 March 1986	18 Apr 2000 – 7 May 2000	17 March 2003	20 days	17 years, 1 day	--	
Maheshwari Prasad Singh	Rajasthan	31 July 1987	25 Dec 1997 – 9 Apr 1998	9 April 1998	107 days	10 years, 253 days	Retired as ACJ	
Devendra Pal Singh Chauhan	Madhya Pradesh	3 January 1989	22 Dec 1999 – 23 Feb 2000	25 March 2000	64 days	11 years, 83 days	--	
Govind Prasad Mathur	Allahabad	6 July 1990	25 Nov 2002 – 19 Dec 2002	19 December 2002^{[‡]}	25 days	12 years, 167 days	Elevated to Supreme Court	
Satya Prakash Srivastava	Allahabad	27 November 1991	20 Dec 2002 – 30 Jan 2003	12 June 2004	42 days	12 years, 199 days	--	
Markandey Katju	Allahabad	30 November 1991	27 Aug 2004 – 27 Nov 2004	9 April 2006^{[‡]}	93 days	14 years, 131 days	Elevated as CJ of Madras	
Vishnu Sahai	Allahabad	1 February 1994	28 Nov 2004 – 29 Dec 2004	29 December 2004	32 days	10 years, 333 days	Retired as ACJ	
Jagadish Bhalla	Chhattisgarh	5 April 1995	19 May 2007 – 1 Feb 2008	31 October 2010	259 days	15 years, 210 days	Elevated as CJ of Himachal Pradesh	
I. M. Quddusi	Orissa	18 April 1995	19 May 2008 – 15 Jul 2008	17 June 2012	58 days	17 years, 61 days	--	
I. M. Quddusi	Orissa	18 April 1995	11 May 2009 – 13 Nov 2009	17 June 2012	187 days	17 years, 61 days	--	
I. M. Quddusi	Orissa	18 April 1995	18 Nov 2009 – 24 Mar 2010	17 June 2012	127 days	17 years, 61 days	Transferred to Chhattisgarh	
Vijay Manohar Sahai	Gujarat	5 February 1999	29 Sep 2014 – 12 Aug 2015	12 August 2015	318 days	16 years, 189 days	Retired as ACJ	
Sushil Harkauli	Jharkhand	5 February 1999	11 Jun 2010 – 21 Aug 2010	1 August 2013	72 days	14 years, 178 days	--	
Sushil Harkauli	Madhya Pradesh	5 February 1999	5 Aug 2011 – 16 Oct 2012	1 August 2013	1 year, 73 days	14 years, 178 days	Transferred to Allahabad	
Prakash Chandra Verma	Uttarakhand	5 February 1999	1 Apr 2003 – 4 Aug 2003	11 January 2013	126 days	13 years, 342 days	--	
Prakash Chandra Verma	Uttarakhand	5 February 1999	18 Dec 2003 – 24 Jul 2004	11 January 2013	220 days	13 years, 342 days	--	
Prakash Chandra Verma	Uttarakhand	5 February 1999	7 Jan 2006 – 13 Jan 2006	11 January 2013	7 days	13 years, 342 days	--	
R. K. Agrawal	Madras	5 February 1999	7 Feb 2013 – 23 Oct 2013	16 February 2014^{[‡]}	259 days	15 years, 12 days	Became permanent	
Sheo Kumar Singh	Allahabad	24 April 2001	21 Oct 2013 – 30 Oct 2013	30 September 2014	10 days	13 years, 160 days	--	
Sunil Ambwani	Rajasthan	24 April 2001	6 Aug 2014 – 23 Mar 2015	22 August 2015	230 days	14 years, 121 days	Became permanent	
Ashok Bhushan	Kerala	24 April 2001	2 Aug 2014 – 25 Mar 2015	12 May 2016^{[‡]}	236 days	15 years, 19 days	Became permanent	
Ram Bhawan Misra	Himachal Pradesh	24 April 2001	10 Aug 2009 – 8 Feb 2010	1 August 2013	183 days	12 years, 100 days	--	
Ram Bhawan Misra	Himachal Pradesh	24 April 2001	8 Mar 2013 – 3 Apr 2013	1 August 2013	27 days	12 years, 100 days	--	
Rakesh Tiwari	Calcutta	14 February 2002	20 Sep 2017 – 24 Oct 2017	24 October 2017	35 days	15 years, 253 days	Retired as ACJ	
Vimlesh Kumar Shukla	Allahabad	21 December 2002	13 May 2016 – 29 Jul 2016	2 June 2017	78 days	14 years, 164 days	--	
Tarun Agarwala	Uttarakhand	7 January 2004	25 Sep 2009 – 28 Nov 2009	2 March 2018	65 days	14 years, 55 days	--	
M. K. Gupta	Allahabad	12 April 2013	22 Nov 2023 – 4 Feb 2024	8 October 2026	75 days	13 years, 180 days	--	
A. K. Mishra	Punjab & Haryana	3 February 2014	2 Jun 2026 – 6 Sep 2026	Incumbent	97 days	12 years, 293 days	Became permanent	

== Judges elevated to Supreme Court ==
This section includes the list of only those judges whose parent high court was Allahabad. This includes those judges who, at the time of elevation to Supreme Court of India, may not be serving in Allahabad High Court but this list does not include judges who at the time of elevation were serving in Allahabad High Court but does not have Allahabad as their Parent High Court.

Colour Key

- Female Judge
- Served as Chief Justice of India

Key

- ^{RES} Resigned
- ^{†} Died in office

#	Name of the Judge	Image	Date of Appointment		Date of Retirement	Tenure			Immediately preceding office
#	Name of the Judge	Image	In Parent High Court	In Supreme Court	Date of Retirement	In High Court(s)	In Supreme Court	Total tenure (Note: Includes both tenure as High Court Judge as well as Supreme Court Judge)	Immediately preceding office
1	Ghulam Hasan		25 July 1948	8 September 1952 (Note: Retired as High Court Judge on 3 July 1951 before being elevated to Supreme Court of India)	5 November 1954^{[†]}	2 years, 344 days	2 years, 59 days	5 years, 38 days	--
2	Kailas Nath Wanchoo		17 February 1947	11 August 1958	24 February 1968	11 years, 175 days	9 years, 198 days	21 years, 8 days	2nd CJ of Rajasthan HC
3	Raghubar Dayal		22 July 1946	27 July 1960	25 October 1965	14 years, 5 days	5 years, 91 days	19 years, 96 days	Judge of Allahabad HC
4	Vashishtha Bhargava		1 August 1949	8 August 1966	4 February 1971	17 years, 7 days	4 years, 181 days	21 years, 188 days	17th CJ of Allahabad HC
5	Mirza Hameedullah Beg		11 June 1963	10 December 1971	21 February 1978	8 years, 182 days	6 years, 74 days	14 years, 256 days	1st CJ of Himachal Pradesh HC
6	Surendra Narayan Dwivedi		12 May 1959	14 August 1972	8 December 1974^{[†]}	13 years, 94 days	2 years, 117 days	15 years, 211 days	Judge of Allahabad HC
7	Raghunandan Swarup Pathak		1 October 1962	20 February 1978	18 June 1989^{[RES]}	15 years, 142 days	11 years, 119 days	26 years, 261 days	2nd CJ of Himachal Pradesh HC
8	Ram Briksha Misra		3 January 1968	30 January 1981	15 June 1986	13 years, 27 days	5 years, 137 days	18 years, 164 days	Judge of Allahabad HC
9	Kamal Narain Singh		25 August 1970	10 March 1986	12 December 1991	15 years, 197 days	5 years, 278 days	21 years, 110 days	Judge of Allahabad HC
10	Narayan Dutta Ojha		3 September 1971	18 January 1988	18 January 1991	16 years, 139 days	3 years, 1 day	19 years, 138 days	11th CJ of Madhya Pradesh HC
11	Ram Manohar Sahai		27 January 1976	11 January 1990	24 June 1995	13 years, 349 days	5 years, 165 days	19 years, 149 days	Judge of Allahabad HC
12	Saiyed Saghir Ahmad		2 November 1981	6 March 1995	30 June 2000	13 years, 124 days	5 years, 117 days	18 years, 242 days	CJ of undivided Andhra Pradesh HC
13	Vishweshwar Nath Khare		25 June 1983	21 March 1997	1 May 2004	13 years, 269 days	7 years, 42 days	21 years, 38 days	29th CJ of Calcutta HC
14	Ajay Prakash Misra		24 May 1984	4 December 1997	31 August 2001	13 years, 194 days	3 years, 271 days	17 years, 100 days	18th CJ of Delhi HC
15	Brijesh Kumar		24 May 1984	19 October 2000	9 June 2004	16 years, 148 days	3 years, 235 days	20 years, 17 days	25th CJ of Gauhati HC
16	Govind Prasad Mathur		6 July 1990	20 December 2002	19 January 2008	12 years, 167 days	5 years, 31 days	17 years, 198 days	Acting CJ of Allahabad HC
17	Markandey Katju		30 November 1991	10 April 2006	19 September 2011	14 years, 131 days	5 years, 163 days	19 years, 294 days	23rd CJ of Delhi HC
18	Balbir Singh Chauhan		5 April 1995	11 May 2009	1 July 2014	14 years, 36 days	5 years, 52 days	19 years, 88 days	22nd CJ of Orissa HC
19	Rajesh Kumar Agrawal		5 February 1999	17 February 2014	4 May 2018	15 years, 12 days	4 years, 77 days	19 years, 89 days	37th CJ of Madras HC
20	Ashok Bhushan		24 April 2001	13 May 2016	4 July 2021	15 years, 19 days	5 years, 53 days	20 years, 72 days	31st CJ of Kerala HC
21	Vineet Saran		14 February 2002	7 August 2018	10 May 2022	16 years, 174 days	3 years, 277 days	20 years, 86 days	29th CJ of Orissa HC
22	Krishna Murari		7 January 2004	23 September 2019	8 July 2023	15 years, 259 days	3 years, 289 days	19 years, 183 days	34th CJ of Punjab & Haryana HC
23	Vikram Nath		24 September 2004	31 August 2021	Incumbent	16 years, 340 days	5 years, 84 days	22 years, 60 days	25th CJ of Gujarat HC
24	Pankaj Mithal		7 July 2006	6 February 2023	16 June 2026	16 years, 214 days	3 years, 131 days	19 years, 345 days	40th CJ of Rajasthan HC
25	Manoj Misra		21 November 2011	6 February 2023	Incumbent	11 years, 76 days	3 years, 290 days	15 years, 2 days	Judge of Allahabad HC
26	Sunita Agarwal		21 November 2011	6 October 2026	Incumbent	14 years, 319 days	48 days	15 years, 2 days	28th CJ of Gujarat HC
27	Devendra Kumar Upadhyaya		21 November 2011	6 October 2026	Incumbent	14 years, 319 days	48 days	15 years, 2 days	34th CJ of Delhi HC

== Critical assessment ==
=== Case load ===
Uttar Pradesh has at least 9 times more pending cases than any other state.

Allahabad High Court as of 2022, has 9.33 lakh cases pending in the fast-track courts of Uttar Pradesh, followed by over 1.04 lakh cases in Maharashtra, 1.02 lakh cases in Tamil Nadu, 71,261 cases in West Bengal and 12,538 cases in Telangana.

A bench at Meerut is needed as a lot of corporate and capital investments in Noida, have gone to other states due to more readily accessibility of justice in corporate affairs.

The decision by Foxconn and Winston to choose Tamil Nadu and Karnataka as their manufacturing hub has been attributed by experts for this very same reason.

The NCR planning committee recommended setting up a High Court bench in Meerut with utmost priority.
