= Vidyadhar Govind Oak =

Indian bureaucrat and judge

- Born: May 18, 1909
- Died: June 14, 1996
- Education: Bachelor of Laws
- Alma mater: University of Allahabad
- Occupation: Judge
- Years active: 1931-1971

Vidyadhar Govind Oak, I.C.S., (born 18 May 1909, died 14 June 1996) was an Indian bureaucrat and Chief Justice of Allahabad High Court.

== Career ==
Oak studied in Maharaja College, Government Madhav Arts and Commerce College, Ujjain and Holkar College of Indore. He graduated in Law from the Allahabad University and joined the Indian Civil Service on 12 October 1931. Initially Oak served as Assistant Collector and Joint Magistrate under the Uttar Pradesh Government in British India for five years and thereafter became District Judge. In 1954 he was the District Judge of Allahabad. He also worked as Judicial Commissioner of Ajmer for few months. In 1955 he was appointed Additional Judge of the Allahabad High Court. Justice Oak was elevated in the post of the Chief Justice on 4 June 1967. He retired from the judgeship in 1971.

== Legacy ==
The Astronomical Society of India gives the Justice V.G. Oak Award to Indian researchers for outstanding thesis in Astronomy.
