= Orby Howell Mootham =

British-Indian civil servant and judge

- Born: 1901; London
- Died: 1995 (aged 93–94)
- Occupation: Judge

Sir Orby Howell Mootham (17 February 1901 – 19 July 1995) was a British lawyer, legal writer, and judge who was the Chief Justice of the Allahabad High Court from 1955 to 1961, the third-last British judge to serve in India.

== Life ==
He was born in 1901. He graduated with an MSc in economics from the University of London and was admitted to the Bar in 1926.

He began his legal practice in Rangoon, Burma in 1927, largely because he was unable to afford the high expenses of starting a legal practice in the United Kingdom. He served in a number of judicial roles. He served as Deputy Judge Advocate in Burma from 1940 to 1942, as assistant to the Judge Advocate General in India from 1942 to 1945, and also as the Chief Judicial Officer in Burma until 1945, and as an acting judge of the Rangoon High Court from 1945 to 1946. He was appointed to the Allahabad High Court in 1946, became Chief Justice in 1955 and retired from that role in 1961.

On returning to the United Kingdom on his retirement, he served as legal adviser in the Commonwealth Relations Office from 1961 to 1963, deputy chairman of the Essex Quarter Sessions from 1964 to 1971 and of Kent from 1965 to 1971, and became a Recorder of the Crown Court in 1972.

He was knighted in 1962.
