= Vashishtha Bhargava =

Indian judge

Vashishtha Bhargava, I.C.S. (5 February 1906 – unknown) was an Indian judge and Justice of the Supreme Court of India.

== Career ==
Bhargava was born in 1906 in British India. He passed M.Sc. from the University of Allahabad in 1925. He qualified for Indian Civil Service and became a joint magistrate in 1930 and civil and sessions judge in 1936. Bhargava was appointed Additional Commissioner for Food and Civil Supplies under the Uttar Pradesh Government in 1947. He also served as Legal Remembrancer and Judicial Secretary. He first became the Puisne Judge of the Allahabad High Court on 1 August 1949. He was one of the in-charges of the Executive and Administrative business of the Court. In 1966 he was elevated as the Chief Justice of the same High Court. Justice Bhargava, was the last of the ICS judges, became the chief justice of the Allahabad High Court. Bhargava became the judge of the Supreme Court of India on 8 August 1966. He retired in February 1971 from the post. He headed the Bhargava Committee to look into the budgetary surplus of Telangana region at the time of 1969 Telangana Agitation.
