= K. S. Hegde =

Speaker of 7th Lok Sabha

Kowdoor Sadananda Hegde
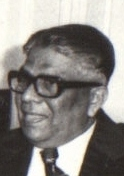

7th Speaker of the Lok Sabha
- In office 21 July 1977 – 21 January 1980
- Deputy: Godey Murahari
- Preceded by: Neelam Sanjiva Reddy
- Succeeded by: Balram Jakhar

Member of Lok Sabha
- In office 1977–1980
- Preceded by: Position established
- Succeeded by: T. R. Shamanna
- Constituency: Bangalore South

Judge of Supreme Court of India
- In office 17 July 1967 – 30 April 1973
- Nominated by: K. N. Wanchoo
- Appointed by: S. Radhakrishnan

1st Chief Justice of Delhi High Court
- In office 31 October 1966 – 16 July 1967
- Nominated by: K. Subba Rao
- Appointed by: S. Radhakrishnan
- Preceded by: Position established
- Succeeded by: Inder Dev Dua

Judge of Mysore High Court
- In office 26 August 1957 – 30 October 1966
- Appointed by: Rajendra Prasad

Member of Rajya Sabha
- In office 3 April 1952 – 21 August 1957
- Constituency: Madras

Personal details
- Born: 11 June 1909 Kawdoor Village, South Canara, Madras Presidency, British India (Presently Karnataka, India)
- Died: 25 May 1990 (aged 81) Mangalore, India
- Party: Janata Party
- Spouse: Meenakshi Hegde
- Children: 6, including N. Santosh Hegde
- Education: M. A. and LL.B
- Alma mater: St. Aloysius, Mangaluru, Presidency College, Chennai, Madras Law College

Kowdoor Sadananda Hegde (11 June 1909 – 24 May 1990), commonly known as K. S. Hegde, was a lawyer, a member of Parliament, a judge of the Mysore High Court, the first Chief Justice of the Delhi High Court, a judge of the Supreme Court of India, and eventually Speaker of the Lok Sabha. Hegde founded the Nitte Education Trust. He is the father of Santhosh Hegde, who also served as a judge in the Supreme Court of India.

== Early life and legal career ==
Hegde was born on 11 June 1909 at Kowdoor in the then South Canara region. He received his early education in Karnataka and subsequently studied at St. Aloysius College, Mangalore, Presidency College, Madras, and the Law College, Madras. He enrolled as advocate of the Bombay High Court in December 1935 and started legal practice in 1936.

His early legal career was principally based in South Canara. He practised at Karkala before moving to Mangalore. He subsequently served as Public Prosecutor and Government Pleader, holding those offices during the period from August 1947 to September 1951.

Hegde's career was not confined to conventional legal practice. In 1952 he entered Parliament as a member of the Rajya Sabha, then known as the Council of States. He remained a member representing Madras State until 21 August 1957, when he resigned because of his appointment to the Mysore High Court brought his first parliamentary career to an end. In 1954 he also represented India at the United Nations as an alternate delegate.

Hegde was appointed a judge of the High Court of Mysore on 26 August 1957. The appointment marked his transition from active politics into the higher judiciary.

== First Chief Justice of Delhi High Court ==
After nearly nine years as a judge of the Mysore High Court, Hegde was appointed the first Chief Justice of the newly established Delhi High Court. He assumed office on 31 October 1966. His appointment was a significant stage in his judicial career because he was entrusted with the Chief Justiceship at a relatively early point in his career as a constitutional judge, and because the new position placed him at the head of a court that was destined to become one of the country's principal High Courts. He served as such till 16 July 1967.

Hegde's tenure in Delhi was brief, lasting only about eight and a half months, but it formed an important bridge between his career as a High Court judge and his subsequent elevation to the Supreme Court. His position was not merely administrative. He continued to sit on the Bench and participate in the judicial work of the new court. The early decisions of the Delhi High Court therefore provide some direct evidence of Hegde's work during this period. One such case was Datta Ram and Others v. Union of India, decided on 6 April 1967. The case had originally been pending before the Punjab High Court's Circuit Bench dealing with Delhi matters and was transferred to the newly established Delhi High Court following the statutory reorganisation. Hegde heard the matter as Chief Justice. The case is consequently useful in understanding his actual judicial work in Delhi: he was dealing with litigation inherited from the previous judicial arrangement while simultaneously exercising the jurisdiction of the newly constituted High Court.

The circumstances of Hegde's appointment also placed him in an interesting judicial environment. The original Bench of the Delhi High Court consisted of Hegde, Justice I. D. Dua, Justice H. R. Khanna and Justice S. K. Kapur. Hegde was therefore working with a small Bench of judges, several of whom would later acquire national significance. Dua subsequently became a Supreme Court judge, while Khanna also went on to the Supreme Court and eventually became one of the most prominent constitutional judges of his generation. Hegde's own later elevation meant that three members of the original Delhi High Court would ultimately serve on the Supreme Court.

Hegde's role was particularly important because the court was still developing its working arrangements when he assumed charge. The cases coming before him included matters transferred from the earlier Punjab High Court jurisdiction, requiring continuity between the old and new judicial systems. His Chief Justiceship therefore involved both ordinary adjudication and the practical exercise of judicial leadership.

The geographical scope of the court over which Hegde presided was also wider than that of the present Delhi High Court. During this period the Delhi High Court exercised jurisdiction in relation to Himachal Pradesh as well as Delhi, and a Bench functioned at Shimla. This meant that Hegde's responsibilities as Chief Justice extended beyond the immediate judicial administration of Delhi. The early arrangements in Himachal Pradesh were handled through the Delhi High Court's Shimla Bench, and one of Hegde's fellow judges, Justice S. K. Kapur, was involved in the initial judicial functioning there. The arrangement was subsequently superseded when Himachal Pradesh obtained its own High Court after becoming a State in 1971.

The physical circumstances in which Hegde worked were also very different from those associated with the Delhi High Court today. The court initially functioned from 4, Maulana Azad Road, rather than from the present Sher Shah Road complex. Hegde's entire tenure therefore belonged to the formative phase of the court, before the construction of its permanent premises. The foundation stone of the present High Court building was not laid until 4 November 1968, more than a year after Hegde had left Delhi. This fact is relevant to his biography because it illustrates the conditions under which he performed the inaugural Chief Justiceship: he was presiding over an institution whose physical and administrative arrangements were still being developed.

One of the most consequential aspects of the Delhi period was therefore its place in the progression of Hegde's career. He did not remain in Delhi long enough to preside over the court's mature institutional development. Instead, his Chief Justiceship became the immediate predecessor to his elevation to the Supreme Court. His last day as Chief Justice was 16 July 1967, and on the following day, 17 July 1967, he took office as a judge of the Supreme Court of India.

== In Supreme Court ==
On 17 July 1967, K. S. Hegde was appointed a judge of the Supreme Court of India. His tenure lasted until 30 April 1973 when he resigned. His Supreme Court career lasted almost six years and coincided with a period of considerable constitutional controversy. Questions concerning Parliament's power to amend the Constitution, the scope of judicial review, fundamental rights, property rights and the constitutional relationship between Parliament and the judiciary occupied the Court during this period. Hegde participated in a number of important constitutional and civil cases.

His judicial record also included election-law litigation. In Shivamurthy Swami Inamdar Veerabhadrappa Veerappa v. Agadi Sanganna Andanappa Chanbasangouda Patil, decided on 11 February 1970, Hegde delivered the judgment in appeals arising from election petitions under the Representation of the People Act, 1951.

He also participated in major constitutional cases involving equality and affirmative action. For example, C. A. Rajendran v. Union of India was decided on 29 September 1967 by a bench including Hegde, and concerned Articles 14 and 16(4) of the Constitution.

These cases illustrate that Hegde's Supreme Court career was not confined to one particular field of law. His work covered constitutional questions, election law, civil litigation and questions concerning governmental power.

=== Hegde and Kesavananda Bharati ===
The most historically consequential judgment in which Hegde participated was Kesavananda Bharati v. State of Kerala, decided on 24 April 1973. The case was heard by a thirteen-judge Constitution Bench, the largest bench assembled by the Supreme Court up to that time. Hegde was one of the judges on the bench. The case concerned the constitutional validity of amendments affecting Parliament's power to amend the Constitution and ultimately resulted in the basic structure doctrine. Hegde and Justice A. K. Mukherjea delivered a joint opinion. Their reasoning was important to the development of the doctrine because they accepted that Parliament possessed a power to amend the Constitution under Article 368 but rejected the proposition that this power was unlimited. They identified certain essential features of the constitutional structure that could not be destroyed through amendment.

Their judgment specifically treated the supremacy of the Constitution as one of the basic elements of its structure. The judgment stated that the basic structure was not merely a vague abstraction and proceeded to identify features that could be regarded as basic elements of the constitutional structure. The final result was a 7–6 decision. The official eCourts presentation of the judgment identifies Hegde and Mukherjea among the seven judges whose conclusions formed part of the majority.

The timing of this judgment is particularly significant when considered alongside Hegde's resignation only six days later. Kesavananda Bharati was decided on 24 April 1973. Chief Justice S. M. Sikri retired the following day, and the Government announced the appointment of Justice A. N. Ray as the next Chief Justice of India on 26 April 1973. Hegde resigned on 30 April 1973. Thus, Hegde's last days on the Supreme Court occurred immediately after one of the most consequential constitutional judgments in Indian history.

== Supression and resignation ==
Until 1973, the practice of appointing the senior-most judge of the Supreme Court as Chief Justice had acquired considerable institutional force. When Chief Justice S. M. Sikri was due to retire in April 1973, the seniority sequence placed Justice J. M. Shelat first, Hegde second and Justice A. N. Grover third. Justice A. N. Ray was fourth in seniority. The Government nevertheless appointed Ray as Chief Justice of India, thereby passing over Shelat, Hegde and Grover. The appointment was announced on 25–26 April 1973, immediately after Sikri's retirement. The three superseded judges subsequently resigned. Shelat and Hegde resigned with effect from 30 April 1973, while Grover remained in office until 31 May 1973.

The episode became known as the 1973 supersession of senior Supreme Court judges. The event generated considerable controversy because the seniority convention had been followed for most of the Supreme Court's history up to that point. The appointment was challenged in P. L. Lakhanpal v. A. N. Ray before the Delhi High Court. The litigation record described the established sequence: Shelat would have been followed by Hegde and then Grover, while Ray would ordinarily have remained below them in the succession.

The reasons behind the Government's decision remain the subject of historical and constitutional debate. Contemporary and later accounts have pointed to ideological and political considerations, particularly the judges' decisions in important constitutional cases. But it is important to distinguish established facts from explanations attributed to the political actors of the period. The episode was therefore not simply a personal disagreement between Hegde and the Government. It became an institutional controversy about the method of appointing the Chief Justice of India and, more broadly, about judicial independence.

Hegde's resignation was described in the official Lok Sabha publication on former Speakers as a resignation "as a matter of principle" following the appointment of a junior judge as Chief Justice of India. The same parliamentary publication describes Hegde as critical of interference by the executive in judicial affairs.

Hegde's resignation is nevertheless significant because it was a voluntary departure from the Supreme Court before the normal end of his judicial career. Had the conventional seniority sequence been followed, he would have become Chief Justice of India after Justice Shelat's retirement. The Delhi High Court litigation concerning the appointment explicitly described this expected sequence.

== Return to politics ==
After resigning from the Supreme Court, Hegde returned to public life. His judicial career had ended, but his involvement with public institutions did not. The 1977 general election transformed his career once again. Hegde contested the Lok Sabha election from Bangalore South on a Janata Party ticket and was elected to the Sixth Lok Sabha. The official parliamentary biography records his election and his subsequent appointment as Chairman of the Committee of Privileges under Speaker Neelam Sanjiva Reddy. Several months later, he became Speaker after the resignation of his predecessor, Neelam Sanjiva Reddy. He held the position from 21 July 1977 to 21 January 1980. Lal Krishna Advani had suggested Hegde's name for Presidentship but Sanjiva Reddy got the nod, and Hegde replaced Reddy as Lok Sabha speaker. Hegde retired from electoral politics after Lok Sabha was dissolved in 1979. He joined BJP when it was founded in 1980 and briefly served as its vice-president.

Hegde's tenure also belonged to a politically turbulent period. The Sixth Lok Sabha followed the Emergency and the defeat of the Congress government in the 1977 election. Parliament consequently operated in a changed political environment, with the Janata Party government and a large opposition presence replacing the political configuration of the previous Lok Sabha. Hegde's tenure lasted only about two and a half years, but it placed a former Supreme Court judge at the centre of parliamentary proceedings during a period of institutional transition.

== Later public life and work in Karnataka ==
After leaving the Speakership, Hegde largely withdrew from active national politics and returned to Karnataka. The Lok Sabha's official account states that after demitting the office of Speaker in January 1980 he settled at his native place in Karnataka.

He subsequently became associated with educational and social initiatives, particularly in and around Nitte. Institutions established or developed in his memory and under his family's educational initiatives continue to associate his name with rural education and social development. The Nitte group's biographical account records his role in establishing the Nitte Education Trust in 1979 and describes his later involvement with rural educational development.

survived by his wife Meenakshi and six children, three sons and three daughters.

== Family and personal life ==
Hegde was married to Meenakshi Hegde and had six children. One of his sons, N. Santosh Hegde, later became a judge of the Supreme Court of India and subsequently Lokayukta of Karnataka. Hegde died on 24 May 1990 at his residence in Mangalore,

== Legacy ==
As a judge of the Supreme Court of India, he was a part of the thirteen judge bench which decided the famous Kesavananda Bharati v. State of Kerala. However, he resigned soon after delivering the majority judgment, as Justice A. N. Ray was appointed the Chief Justice of India, although Hegde was senior judge at the time. In an obituary of Hegde, Justice M. M. Ismail wrote, "His tenure as a Judge of the Supreme Court was notable for his learned judgements which were characterised by basic legal principles and practical common-sense. The end of his judicial career was equally notable for his sense of self-respect and dignity which he attached to his office, as he resigned his office without the slightest hesitation the movement [sic] he heard the news over the all India Radio that he and two senior colleagues of his had been superseded in the appointment of the Chief Justice of the Supreme Court."

The K.S. Hegde Medical Academy, a medical college in Deralakatte and a unit of the Nitte Education Trust, was named after Hegde. The Justice KS Hegde Charitable Foundation, a trust dedicated to the advancement of education and community development in Mangalore, was established in memory of Hegde. Each year, the foundation awards the Justice K.S. Hegde Foundation Awards; previous winners include former Indian prime minister Manmohan Singh.
