= Kesavananda Bharati v. State of Kerala =

1970 decision of the Supreme Court of India

Kesavananda Bharati vs State of Kerala
- Court: Supreme Court of India
- Full case name: His Holiness Kesavananda Bharati Sripadagalvaru & Ors. v. State of Kerala & Anr.
- Decided: 24 April 1973
- Citations: 1973 Supp. (1) S.C.R. 1; 1973 INSC 91; (1973) 4 SCC 225; AIR 1973 SC 1461;

Court membership
- Judges sitting: Sikri, C. J., A. N. Grover, A. N. Ray, D. G. Palekar, H. R. Khanna, J. M. Shelat, K. K. Mathew, K. S. Hegde, M.H. Beg, P. Jaganmohan Reddy, A. K. Mukherjea, S. N. Dwivedi, Y. V. Chandrachud

Case opinions
- There are certain principles within the framework of Indian Constitution which form its 'basic structure'. These principles are inviolable and hence cannot be amended by Parliament.
- Majority: Sikri, C. J.; Hegde and Mukherjea, JJ.; Shelat and Grover, JJ.; Jaganmohan Reddy, J.; Khanna, J.
- Dissent: Ray, J.; Palekar, J.; Mathew, J.; Beg, J.; Dwivedi, J.; Chandrachud, J.

Laws applied
- This case overturned a previous ruling
- I.C. Golaknath and Ors. v. State of Punjab and Anrs. (1967)

His Holiness Kesavananda Bharati Sripadagalvaru & Ors. v. State of Kerala & Anr. (Writ Petition (Civil) 135 of 1970), also known as the Kesavananda Bharati judgement, was a landmark decision of the Supreme Court of India that outlined the basic structure doctrine of the Indian Constitution. The case is also known as the Fundamental Rights Case. The court in a 7-6 decision asserted its right to strike down amendments to the constitution that were in violation of the fundamental architecture of the constitution.

Justice Hans Raj Khanna argued that the Constitution possesses a basic structure of constitutional principles and values. The Court partially cemented the prior precedent Golaknath v. State of Punjab, which held that constitutional amendments through Article 368 were subject to fundamental rights review, but only if they could affect the 'basic structure of the Constitution'. At the same time, the Court also upheld the constitutionality of the first provision of Article 31-C, which implied that laws seeking to implement the Directive Principles, which do not affect the 'Basic Structure,' shall not be subjected to judicial review.

The doctrine forms the basis of power of the Indian judiciary to review and override amendments to the Constitution of India enacted by the Indian parliament.

The 13-judge Constitution bench of the Supreme Court deliberated on the limitations, if any, of the powers of the elected representatives of the people and the nature of fundamental rights of an individual. In a verdict divided 7–6, the court held that while the Parliament has 'wide' powers, it did not have the power to destroy or emasculate the basic elements or fundamental features of the constitution.

When this case was decided, the underlying apprehension of the majority bench that elected representatives could not be trusted to act responsibly was unprecedented. The Kesavananda judgment also defined the extent to which Parliament could restrict property rights, in pursuit of land reform and the redistribution of large landholdings to cultivators, overruling previous decisions that suggested that the right to property could not be restricted. The case was a culmination of a series of cases relating to limitations to the power to amend the Constitution.

== Facts ==
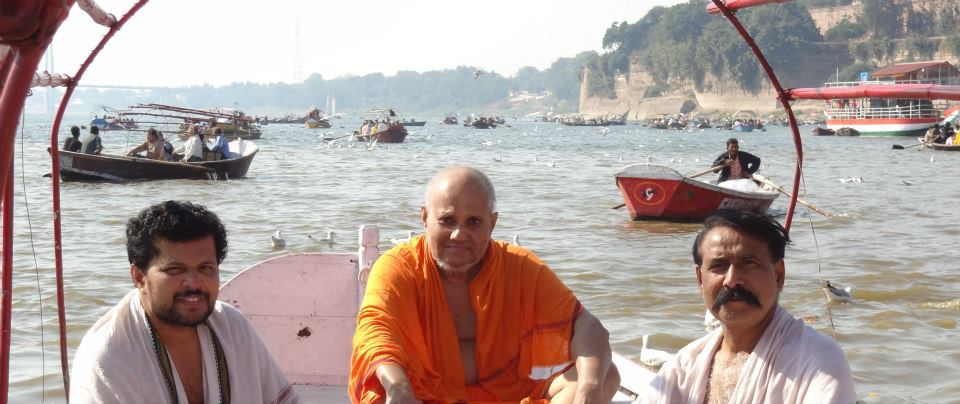
Kesavananda Bharati (center) at the Kumbh Mela in February 2013.

In February 1970 Swami Kesavananda Bharati, senior pontiff and head of the Hindu monastery Edneer Matha in Edneer, Kasaragod District, Kerala, challenged the Kerala government's attempts, under two land reform acts, to impose restrictions on the management of its property. A noted Indian jurist, Nanabhoy Palkhivala, convinced Swami into filing his petition under Article 26, concerning the right to manage religiously owned property without government interference. The case had been heard for 68 days, the arguments commencing on October 31, 1972, and ending on March 23, 1973, and its judgement consists of 700 pages.

== Judgement ==
The Supreme Court reviewed the decision in Golaknath v. State of Punjab in which it was held that Parliament cannot amend the fundamental rights, and considered the validity of the article 24th, 25th, 26th and 29th amendments. The case was heard by the largest ever Constitution Bench of 13 Judges. The bench gave eleven separate judgments, which agreed in some points and differed on others. Nanabhoy Palkhivala, assisted by Fali Nariman and Soli Sorabjee, presented the case against the government in both cases.

=== Majority judgement ===
Upholding the validity of clause 1 of article 13 and a corresponding provision in article 368(3), inserted by the 24th Amendment, the Court reversed its ruling in Golaknath v. State of Punjab and settled in favour of the view that Parliament has the power to amend the fundamental rights. However, the Court affirmed another proposition also asserted in the Golaknath case, by ruling that the expression "amendment" of this Constitution in article 368 means any addition or change in any of the provisions of the Constitution within the broad contours of the Preamble and the Constitution to carry out the objectives in the Preamble and the Directive Principles. Applied to fundamental rights, it would be that while fundamental rights cannot be abrogated, reasonable abridgement of fundamental rights could be affected in the public interest. The true position is that every provision of the Constitution can be amended provided the basic foundation and structure of the Constitution remains the same.

The nine signatories to the statement were

1. Chief Justice S M Sikri
2. J. M. Shelat
3. K. S. Hegde
4. A. N. Grover
5. P. Jaganmohan Reddy
6. D. G. Palekar
7. H R Khanna
8. A. K. Mukherjee
9. Y.V. Chandrachud.

Four judges did not sign the judgment

1. A. N. Ray,
2. K. K. Mathew
3. M. H. Beg
4. S. N. Dwivedi.

==== S.M. Sikri, Chief Justice ====
CJI S M Sikri held that the fundamental importance of the freedom of the individual has to be preserved for all times to come and that it could not be amended out of existence. According to the Chief Justice, fundamental rights conferred by Part III of the Constitution of India cannot be abrogated, though a reasonable abridgment of those rights could be effected in public interest. There is a limitation on the power of amendment by necessary implication which was apparent from a reading of the preamble and therefore, according to the learned Chief Justice, the expression 'amendment of this Constitution,' in Article 368, means any addition or change in any of the provisions of the Constitution within the broad contours of the preamble, made in order to carry out the basic objectives of the Constitution. Accordingly, every provision of the Constitution was open to amendment provided the basic foundation or structure of the Constitution was not damaged or destroyed.

==== Shelat and Grover, JJ ====
Held that the preamble to the Constitution contains the clue to the fundamentals of the Constitution. According to the learned Judges, Parts III and IV of the Constitution which respectively embody the fundamental rights and the directive principles have to be balanced and harmonised. This balance & harmony between two integral parts of the Constitution forms a basic element of the Constitution which cannot be altered. The word 'amendment' occurring in Article 368 must therefore be construed in such a manner as to preserve the power of the Parliament to amend the Constitution, but not so as to result in damaging or destroying the structure and identity of the Constitution. There was thus an implied limitation on the amending power which prevented the Parliament from abolishing or changing the identity of the Constitution or any of its Basic Structure.

==== Hegde and Mukherjea, JJ ====
Held that the Constitution of India which is essentially a social rather than a political document, is founded on a social philosophy and as such has two main features basic and circumstantial. The basic constituent remained constant, the circumstantial was subject to change. According to the learned Judges, the broad contours of the basic elements and the fundamental features of the Constitution are delineated in the preamble and the Parliament has no power to abolish or emasculate those basic elements of fundamental features. The building of a welfare State is the ultimate goal of every Government but that does not mean that in order to build a welfare State, human freedoms have to suffer a total destruction. Applying these tests, the learned Judges invalidated Article 31C even in its un-amended form.

==== Jaganmohan Reddy, J ====
Held that the word 'amendment' was used in the sense of permitting a change, in contradistinction to destruction, which the repeal or abrogation brings about. Therefore, the width of the power of amendment could not be enlarged by amending the amending power itself. The learned Judge held that the essential elements of the basic structure of the Constitution are reflected in its preamble and that some of the important features of the Constitution are justice, freedom of expression and equality of status and opportunity. The word 'amendment' could not possibly embrace the right to abrogate the pivotal features and the fundamental freedoms and therefore, that part of the basic structure could not be damaged or destroyed. According to the learned Judge, the provisions of Article 31d, as they, conferring power on Parliament and the State Legislatures to enact laws for giving effect to the principles specified in Clauses (b) and (c) of Article 39, altogether abrogated the right given by Article 14 and were for that reason unconstitutional. In conclusion, the learned Judge held that though the power of amendment was wide, it did not comprehend the power to totally abrogate or emasculate or damage any of the fundamental rights or the essential elements of the basic structure of the Constitution or to destroy the identity of the Constitution. Subject to these limitations, Parliament had the right to amend any and every provision of the Constitution.

==== H R Khanna J. ====
H R Khanna has given in his judgment that the Parliament had full power to amend the Constitution, however, since it is only a 'power to amend,' the basic structure or framework of the structure should remain intact. While as per the aforesaid views of the six learned Judges, certain "essential elements" (which included fundamental rights) of the judgment cannot be amended as there are certain implied restrictions on the powers of the parliament of India.

According to the Judge, although it was permissible for the Parliament to effect changes in the exercise of its amending power so as to meet the requirements of changing conditions, it was not permissible to touch the foundation or to alter the basic institutional pattern. Therefore, the words 'amendment of the Constitution' in spite of the width of their sweep and in spite of their amplitude, could not have the effect of empowering the Parliament to destroy or abrogate the basic structure or framework of the Constitution.

This gave birth to the basic structure doctrine, which has been considered as the cornerstone of the Constitutional law in India.

== Significance ==
The government of Indira Gandhi did not take kindly to this restriction on its powers by the court. On 26 April 1973, Justice Ajit Nath Ray, who was among the dissenters, was promoted to Chief Justice of India superseding three senior Judges, Shelat, Grover and Hegde, which was unprecedented in Indian legal history.

The 42nd Amendment, enacted in 1976, is considered to be the immediate and most direct fall out of the judgment. Apart from it, the judgement cleared the deck for complete legislative authority to amend any part of the Constitution except when the amendments are not in consonance with the basic features of the Constitution.

In the 1975 case Indira Nehru Gandhi v. Raj Narain, a Constitution Bench of the Supreme Court used the basic structure doctrine to strike down the 39th amendment. The 39th Amendment was passed in 1975, during The Emergency and placed the election of the President, the Vice President, the Prime Minister and the Speaker of the Lok Sabha beyond the scrutiny of the Indian courts. Adopting this amendment was a move to suppress Gandhi's prosecution.

The basic structure doctrine was also adopted by the Supreme Court of Bangladesh in 1989, by expressly relying on the reasoning in the Kesavananda case, in its ruling on Anwar Hossain Chowdhury v. Bangladesh (41 DLR 1989 App. Div. 165, 1989 BLD (Spl.) 1).

== See also ==
- Indian law
- Basic structure doctrine
- Edneer
- Edneer Mutt
- Sri Kesavananda Bharati
- Nanabhoy Palkhivala
- I.C. Golaknath and Ors. v. State of Punjab and Anrs.
