= Hans Raj Khanna =

Indian judge (1912–2008)

Minister of Law and Justice
- In office 30 July 1979 - 3 August 1979
- Appointed by: Neelam Sanjiva Reddy
- Prime Minister: Charan Singh
- Preceded by: Shanti Bhushan
- Succeeded by: Shyam Nath Kacker

Chairman, 8th Law Commission of India
- In office 1977–1979
- Appointed by: Neelam Sanjiva Reddy
- Prime Minister: Morarji Desai
- Preceded by: P. B. Gajendragadkar (7th)
- Succeeded by: P. V. Dixit (9th)

Judge of Supreme Court of India
- In office 22 September 1971 – 12 March 1977
- Nominated by: S. M. Sikri
- Appointed by: V. V. Giri

3rd Chief Justice of Delhi High Court
- In office 1 August 1969 – 22 September 1971
- Appointed by: M. Hidayatullah (Acting President of India)
- Preceded by: Inder Dev Dua
- Succeeded by: Hardayal Hardy

Judge of Delhi High Court
- In office 31 October 1966 – 31 July 1969
- Appointed by: Zakir Husain

Judge of Punjab & Haryana High Court
- In office 7 May 1962 – 31 October 1966
- Appointed by: Rajendra Prasad

Personal details
- Born: 3 July 1912 Amritsar, Punjab, British India
- Died: 25 February 2008 (aged 95) New Delhi, India
- Spouse: Uma Mehra
- Relations: Sanjiv Khanna (nephew)
- Children: 4
- Education: Panjab University

Hans Raj Khanna (3 July 1912 – 25 February 2008) was an Indian judge, jurist and advocate who propounded the basic structure doctrine in 1973 and attempted to uphold civil liberties during the time of Emergency in India in a lone dissenting judgement in 1976. He entered the Indian judiciary in 1952 as an Additional District and Sessions Judge and subsequently was elevated as a judge to the Supreme Court of India in 1971 where he continued till his resignation in 1977.

He is most notably remembered for his minority judgment in the highly publicized ADM Jabalpur v. Shiv Kant Shukla habeas corpus case during the 1975 - 1977 Indian Emergency, in which the remaining four judges of the five-member bench, Chief Justice A. N. Ray, Justice M. H. Beg, Justice Y. V. Chandrachud and Justice P. N. Bhagwati, agreed with the government's view that even the fundamental rights enshrined in the Constitution of India like the right to life and liberty stood abrogated during a period of national emergency. Khanna was the lone dissenting vote; his opinion, claimed that Article 21 (on protection of life and personal liberty) of the Constitution could not possibly be the sole repository of the fundamental rights to life and liberty as these predate the Constitution itself. His view that these inalienable rights cannot be abrogated by executive decree, even during a period of national emergency, is praised for his 'fearlessness' and 'eloquence'.

In January 1977, nine months after delivering his dissenting judgment in the ADM Jabalpur case, Justice Khanna was superseded for the position of Chief Justice of India by Prime Minister Indira Gandhi, who appointed Justice M. H. Beg instead. This decision broke the long-standing convention of appointing the senior-most judge of the Supreme Court of India as the Chief Justice upon the retirement of the incumbent. At the time, Khanna was the most senior judge on the bench. In response, he submitted his resignation, which took effect in March 1977.

Khanna had previously authored the basic structure doctrine of the Constitution of India in Kesavananda Bharati v. State of Kerala, which curtailed Parliament's seemingly unfettered amending power under article 368, restricting its scope of amendment in areas which were part of the Constitution's "basic structure". In addition, he delivered noted judgments in the Ahmedabad St. Xavier's College v. State of Gujarat (1974) and State of Kerala v. N. M. Thomas (1975) cases.

After resigning from the Supreme Court, he served as the central minister of law and justice for a very short period of three days in the Charan Singh Ministry after the fall of the Indira Gandhi Government, and was later made a combined opposition-sponsored candidate for election as President in 1982, losing to Zail Singh.

In 1999, he was awarded the Padma Vibhushan in recognition of his career in judicial service, the second-highest civilian honor given by the Government of India.

== Early life and background ==
Khanna was born in Amritsar, Punjab, in 1912, the son of lawyer and freedom fighter Sarb Dyal Khanna. The family hailed from a trading tradition, but Khanna’s father had become a leading lawyer and later, the mayor of Amritsar. Khanna’s mother died at a young age, and the household was run by his grandmother. His brother was Dev Raj. Khanna took interest in law from an early age and did complete his schooling at DAV High School, Amritsar.

After completing his schooling at D.A.V. High School, Amritsar (1918–1928), He studied at the Hindu College, Amritsar, and Khalsa College, Amritsar, graduating with a Bachelor of Arts, before joining the Punjab University Law College, Lahore (1932–1934). He married Uma Mehra in 1934 at the age of 22. After completing his graduation in law, he practiced law primarily in Amritsar, dealing mainly with civil cases, and soon gathered a large practice which he maintained till his elevation to the bench in 1952.

== Early judicial career ==
In January 1952 he was nominated by Sir Eric Weston, Chief Justice of Punjab, as District and Sessions Judge. This was "an uncommon appointment.... it had long been the practice to appoint only from the civil service". He served in the district courts at Ferozepur, and then Ambala.

He became known for his decision to convict India's leading industrialist Ramkrishna Dalmia of corruption. Dalmia served 2 years in Tihar Jail.

He moved as District and Sessions Judge, Delhi until he was appointed Judge of the Punjab High Court in 1962. On the formation of the Delhi High Court, he joined the bench as one of its first judges. He conducted the inquiry into corruption charges against Biju Patnaik and other Ministers in Orissa. While some of the charges were found true, Biju himself was absolved. He served as Chief Justice of Delhi High Court from 1969 until September 1971 when he was appointed a Judge of the Supreme Court of India.

== Judge of the Supreme Court ==
=== Keshavananda Bharati v. State of Kerala (Basic Structure Doctrine) ===
While the Habeas Corpus case is Justice Khanna's most celebrated ruling, almost as well known is his judgment in the landmark case of Kesavananda Bharati. In 1973, the Supreme Court constituted its largest-ever bench of 13 judges to decide whether Parliament had the unfettered right to amend the Constitution or not. On 24 April 1973, seven out of 13 judges held that Parliament's power to amend the Constitution was limited. Six other judges in the case were of the view that Parliament's power was unrestricted. Justice Khanna's judgment held that, although the Constitution is amenable to amendments, changes that ultra vires, tinker with its basic structure cannot be made by Parliament, that is – certain parts of the constitution were "basic" and could not be amended. However, he also said the amendment of the right was fundamental – as he explained, "If no provisions were made for amendment of the constitution, the people would have recourse to extra constitutional method like revolution to change the constitution".

The judgment clarified and partially overruled the court's earlier verdict in Golak Nath by holding that Parliament could amend the Constitution, particularly the property right.

=== The Habeas Corpus Case ===
Justice Khanna is renowned for exhibiting immense courage during the Indian Emergency (1975–1977) declared by Indira Gandhi.

The emergency was declared when Justice Jagmohanlal Sinha of the Allahabad High Court invalidated the election of Indira Gandhi to the Lok Sabha in June 1975, upholding charges of electoral fraud, in the case filed by Raj Narain.

Owing to the repressive Maintenance of Internal Security Act (MISA) which provided for the unlawful detainment of individuals without trial, several high courts had given relief to the detainees by accepting their right to habeas corpus as stated in Article 21 of the Indian constitution. This issue was at the heart of the case of the Additional District Magistrate of Jabalpur v. Shiv Kant Shukla, popularly known as the Habeas Corpus case, which came up for hearing in front of the Supreme Court in December 1975. Given the important nature of the case, a bench comprising the five seniormost judges was convened to hear the case.

During the arguments, Justice Khanna at one point asked the Attorney General Niren De: "Life is also mentioned in Article 21, and would Government argument extend to it also?". He answered, "Even if life was taken away legally, courts are helpless".

The bench opined in April 1976, with the majority deciding against habeas corpus, permitting unrestricted powers of detention during an emergency. Justices A. N. Ray, P. N. Bhagwati, Y. V. Chandrachud, and M.H. Beg, stated in the majority decision:

Given the Presidential Order [declaring emergency] no person has any locus to move any writ petition under Art. 226 before a High Court for habeas corpus or any other writ or order or direction to challenge the legality of an order of detention.

Justice Beg even went on to observe: "We understand that the care and concern bestowed by the state authorities upon the welfare of detenues who are well housed, well-fed, and well treated, is almost maternal."

However, Justice Khanna resisted the pressure to concur with this majority view. He wrote in his dissenting opinion:

The Constitution and the laws of India do not permit life and liberty to be at the mercy of the absolute power of the Executive . . . . What is at stake is the rule of law. The question is whether the law speaking through the authority of the court shall be silenced and rendered mute... detention without trial is an anathema to all those who love personal liberty.

In the end, he quoted Justice Charles Evans Hughes:

A dissent is an appeal to the brooding spirit of the law, to the intelligence of a future day, when a later decision may correct the error into which the dissenting judge believes the court to have been betrayed.

Before delivering this opinion, Justice Khanna mentioned to his sister: I have prepared my judgment, which is going to cost me the Chief Justice-ship of India.

=== Aftermath of the judgment ===
True to his apprehensions, his junior, M. H. Beg, was appointed Chief Justice in January 1977. This was against legal tradition and was widely protested by bar associations and the legal community. Justice Khanna resigned on the same day. After his resignation Bar Associations all over India, in protest, abstained from the courts and took out black-coat processions, though to no avail. However, this was the last supersession in the history of the Supreme Court, and eventually, the judiciary even wrested the power of judicial appointments from the executive in a landmark ruling in the Advocates-on-Record case in 1993 (also known as the Second Judges Case).

The New York Times, wrote at the time:

If India ever finds its way back to the freedom and democracy that were proud hallmarks of its first eighteen years as an independent nation, someone will surely erect a monument to Justice H R Khanna of the Supreme Court. It was Justice Khanna who spoke out fearlessly and eloquently for freedom this week in dissenting from the Court's decision upholding the right of Prime Minister Indira Gandhi's Government to imprison political opponents at will and without court hearings... The submission of an independent judiciary to an absolutist government is virtually the last step in the destruction of a democratic society, and the Indian Supreme Court's decision appears close to utter surrender.

Justice Khanna's dissenting judgment has been consistently lauded by lawyers, scholars, and intellectuals alike and has been compared to the dissent of Lord Atkin in Liversidge v Anderson.

Nani Palkhivala's book, which came out soon after the emergency was revoked, carried a full-fledged chapter on him titled, "Salute to Justice Khanna". At one point in the chapter, he says of Justice Khanna, "his statue must be installed in every street and corner of the country for the yeoman service rendered by him for the cause of justice".

In December 1978, his full-size portrait was unveiled in his former court, courtroom number 2 of the Supreme Court. As of now, nobody else has had their portrait put up in the Supreme Court during their lifetime.

In fact, when the Supreme Court Bar Association asked for contributions from its members to collect Rs 10,000 for the portrait, within half an hour Rs 30,000 was on the table and the members of the bar had to be forcibly stopped.

== Post-judicial career ==
Upon the suspension of the emergency, the Janata Party which was preparing for the impending elections urged him to contest them but he refused and preferred instead to carry on chamber practice. He was highly active with it, taking international arbitrations into his early nineties.

After Indira Gandhi lost the elections of 1977, the ruling Janata Party wanted him to head the Commission of Inquiry against the illegal imposition of the emergency and the various atrocities committed during it but Khanna refused, as he felt he would appear biased against Indira Gandhi and her son Sanjay Gandhi.

He was then offered the Chairmanship of the Finance Commission, a position he also refused. He did however accept the office of Chairman of the Law Commission of India, a post he held without any pay. He resigned from its chairmanship in 1979 when he was inducted into the cabinet as Union Law Minister by Charan Singh. However, he resigned within 3 days. As it so happened, the entire government fell within six months.

In 1982, Khanna was nominated for President of India, as a combined opposition candidate supported by as many as nine opposition parties. However, the Congress Party had a huge majority numerically and he lost to Giani Zail Singh.

From 1985 until 2000, he was the national president of the Bharat Vikas Parishad, after which he became patron to the organisation. He was a long time board member of, and for many years the chairman of the Press Trust of India.

In 1998, the Justice HR Khanna committee was constituted by the railway ministry with the mandate of "reviewing the implementation of previous accident inquiry committees, of examining the adequacy of existing practices for the safe running of trains and to suggest safety measures." Under his chairmanship, the Railway Safety Review Committee made 278 recommendations, out of which 239 were accepted by the railways.

In 2001 he chaired the advisory panel to the Government of India on strengthening the institutions of parliamentary democracy.

A prolific writer, he also lectured regularly and many of his lectures were later published in book form. Among the books he has authored, are "Judicial Review or Confrontation" (1977), Constitution and civil liberties (1978, based on the B. R. Ambedkar memorial lectures), Making of India's Constitution (1981, based on the Sulakshani Devi Mahajan lectures), "Judiciary in India and Judicial Process" (1985, based on the Tagore Law Lectures), Liberty, Democracy and Ethics, Society and the Law, which mainly deal with Indian law and the constitution. He also wrote an autobiography, Neither Roses nor Thorns, (Lucknow, 1985).

In the conclusion of his Making of India's constitution, he writes:

If the Indian constitution is our heritage bequeathed to us by our founding fathers, no less are we, the people of India, the trustees, and custodians of the values which pulsate within its provisions! A constitution is not a parchment of paper, it is a way of life and has to be lived up to. Eternal vigilance is the price of liberty and in the final analysis, its only keepers are the people. The imbecility of men, history teaches us, always invites the impudence of power."

He published his autobiography, Neither Roses Nor Thorns in 2003. Khanna died on 25 February 2008 at the age of 95.

== Honours and tributes ==
The Government of India honored him with the Padma Vibhushan, India's second-highest civilian award, in 1999.

He has been awarded honorary Doctor of Law degrees by numerous universities, including Faculty of Law, University of Delhi, National Law School of India University, Government Law College, Mumbai, University of Calcutta and his alma mater Panjab University.

On the occasion of his 90th birthday, the Supreme Court Bar Association presented him with a plaque conferring upon him the title of "Living Legend of Law".

Two sets of lectures are held in Justice Khanna's honor.

A series of lectures were organized by Justice Khanna's family for some years after his death but were subsequently discontinued. They were presided over by Soli Sorabjee, who was a very close friend of Justice Khanna's.

The first lecture was delivered by Justice M.N. Venkatachaliah, on the topic "The Constitutional World of Justice Khanna". In 2010, the speaker was K.K. Venugopal. The third installment in 2011 was delivered by Justice Santosh Hegde. In 2012, the last in this succession of lectures, the H.R. Khanna Centennial Memorial Lecture was held – the speakers of which were Justice J.S. Verma and B G Verghese.

The KIIT Law School also holds an H.R. Khanna Memorial Lecture. The first one was delivered by Gopal Subramaniam, in 2011 on the topic "Legal and Political Processes in Modern Indian Democracy". It was presided over by Justice Ranganath Misra. The same lecture for the year 2012 was delivered by Justice Dipak Misra.

International Journal of Law & Management Studies holds an Essay Competition in honor of Justice Khanna called the IJLMS Justice H.R. Khanna Memorial Essay Competition in May annually. The First Edition of this competition was held in association with IPMarkets, Hyderabad.

== Personal life and family ==
Khanna was married to Uma Mehra. He and Uma had three sons and one daughter. Khanna died on 25 February 2008, at the age of 95. His brother, Dev Raj, was a judge of the Delhi High Court. His nephew and the son of his brother Dev Raj, Sanjiv Khanna, served as the Chief Justice of India from November 2024 to May 2025.

== Bibliography ==
- Hans Raj Khanna (1 July 1977). Judicial review or confrontation?. Macmillan, India. ISBN 9780836400243.
- Hans Raj Khanna (1978). Constitution and Civil Liberties. Radha Krishna.
- Hans Raj Khanna (1979). Constitution and Socio-economic Changes: Two Lectures. Publications Division, Government of India.
- Hans Raj Khanna (1979). Liberty, Democracy, and Ethics. Rādhā Krishna.
- Hans Raj Khanna (1980). The Judicial System. Indian Institute of Public Administration.
- Hans Raj Khanna (1980). The Reform of the Judiciary. Forum of Free Enterprise.
- Hans Raj Khanna (1980). Law and the Layman. PHD Chamber of Commerce and Industry.
- Hans Raj Khanna (1981). Law, Men of Law, and Education. Tripathi.
- Hans Raj Khanna (1981). Society and the Law. Ashok Publishing House.
- Hans Raj Khanna (1984). Federal element in the Indian Constitution. Board of Extra-Mural Studies, University of Poona.
- Hans Raj Khanna (1985). Judiciary in India and judicial process. Ajoy Law House.
- Hans Raj Khanna (1985). The States and the Centre in India. Popular Prakashan, for Jayaprakash Foundation.
- Hans Raj Khanna (1987). Terrorism in Punjab: Cause and Cure. Panchnad Research Institute.
- Hans Raj Khanna (1988). Issues Before The Nation. B.R. Publishing Corporation. ISBN 978-81-7018-479-9.
- Hans Raj Khanna (2008). Making of India's Constitution. Eastern Book Company. ISBN 978-81-7012-108-4.
- Hans Raj Khanna (2003). Neither Roses Nor Thorns. Eastern Book Company. ISBN 978-81-7012-785-7.
- Hans Raj Khanna (2013). Selected Writings of Justice H.R. Khanna. ISBN 978-93-5035-349-3.
