= D. G. Palekar =

Former judge of Supreme Court of India (1971-1974)

Hon'ble Justice Devidas Ganpat Palekar

Judge of Supreme Court of India
- In office 19 July 1971 – 3 September 1974
- Nominated by: Sarv Mittra Sikri
- Appointed by: V. V. Giri

Judge of Bombay High Court
- In office 14 October 1961 – 18 July 1971
- Nominated by: B. P. Sinha
- Appointed by: Rajendra Prasad

Personal details
- Born: 4 September 1909 North Kanara, Bombay Presidency (present day in Karnataka)
- Died: 9 December 2004 (aged 95) Lonavala, Maharashtra
- Education: Elphinstone College (B.A.), Government Law College, Bombay (LL.B)

Devidas Ganpat Palekar(4 September 1909 – 9 December 2004) also known as D. G. Palekar was an Indian jurist who served as a judge of the Bombay High Court and subsequently as a judge of the Supreme Court of India. He rose through the ranks of the Bombay Judicial Service to become a notable figure in India's legal history.

== Education and career ==
Palekar was born on 4 September 1909 in the North Kanara district of the Bombay Presidency, in present-day Karnataka. He completed his schooling at Government High School, Karwar, and pursued higher education at Elphinstone College and the Government Law College in Bombay. He obtained a Bachelor of Arts degree and a Bachelor of Laws degree before enrolling as an advocate of the Bombay High Court on 2 February 1934. He practised civil and criminal law, including matters on the appellate side of the High Court.

In June 1939, Palekar joined the Bombay Judicial Service as a Civil Judge, Junior Division. He was promoted to Assistant Judge and Assistant Sessions Judge in September 1949, gaining experience in civil adjudication and criminal trials. From 1954 to 1956, he served as Deputy Secretary in the Maharashtra government’s Legal Department. He subsequently served as a District Judge from August 1956 to September 1958. His administrative career continued at the Bombay High Court, where he was appointed Additional Registrar in October 1958 and became Registrar on 15 January 1959.

== As Judge ==
On 14 October 1961, he was appointed an Additional Judge of the Bombay High Court for a two-year term. He became permanent judge on 27 August 1962. On 19 July 1971, he was elevated to the Supreme Court of India. During his tenure in Supreme Court, he was the part of the 13 judge bench hearing the historic case of Kesavananda Bharati v. State of Kerala which gave rise to Basic structure doctrine, however, he delivered a dissenting opinion. His position was that Parliament’s power to amend the Constitution under Article 368 was broad and should not be restricted by an implied limitation based on an undefined “basic structure” of the Constitution. He disagreed with the majority’s approach of placing substantive limits on the amending power.

Palekar retired from the Supreme Court on 4 September 1974, upon attaining the age of 65. His career was remarkable because he rose from the lowest level of the judicial service to the country’s highest court, despite the judiciary’s limited representation of officers from the subordinate judicial service in the High Court during the preceding century.

Palekar passed away on 9 December 2004, aged 95 at his home in Lonavala.
