= Chhotalal =

Chhotalal is a surname. Notable people with the surname include:

- Ranchhodlal Chhotalal (1823–1898), Indian industrialist
- Jayantilal Chhotalal Shah (1906–1991), Indian jurist
