= Mirza Hameedullah Beg =

15th Chief Justice of India

Hon'ble Chief Justice Mirza Hameedullah Beg

15th Chief Justice of India
- In office 29 January 1977 – 21 February 1978
- Appointed by: Fakhruddin Ali Ahmed
- Preceded by: A. N. Ray
- Succeeded by: Y. V. Chandrachud

Judge of Supreme Court of India
- In office 10 December 1971 – 28 January 1977
- Nominated by: S. M. Sikri
- Appointed by: V. V. Giri

1st Chief Justice of Himachal Pradesh High Court
- In office 25 January 1971 – 9 December 1971
- Nominated by: J. C. Shah
- Appointed by: V. V. Giri
- Preceded by: Position established
- Succeeded by: R. S. Pathak; Dhruva Bihari Lal (acting)

Judge of Allahabad High Court
- In office 11 June 1963 – 24 January 1971
- Nominated by: B. P. Sinha
- Appointed by: S. Radhakrishnan

Personal details
- Born: 22 February 1913 Lucknow, United Provinces of Agra and Oudh, British India
- Died: 19 November 1988 (aged 75) Delhi, India
- Relations: Mirza Nasirullah Beg (brother); Syed Jafar Imam (father-in-law)
- Education: Cambridge University

Mirza Hameedullah Beg (M. H. Beg) (22 February 1913 – 19 November 1988) was the 15th Chief Justice of India, serving from January 1977 to February 1978.

== Early life and education ==
Born into a Deccani Muslim family, his father Mirza Samiullah Beg was the Chief Justice of Hyderabad State, making him an important figure in Hyderabad state affairs. His brother Mirza Nasirullah Beg served as chief justice of Allahabad High Court in 1966. He was the uncle of internationally acclaimed beautician Shahnaz Husain.

He married the daughter of Syed Jafar Imam, former judge of Supreme Court of India.

As was the case with many children of aristocracy in Hyderabad at the time, Mirza Hameedullah Beg attended St. George's Grammar School, where he earned a gold medal for securing first position in Senior Cambridge H.S.L.C. Examination.

As India was still under heavy British influence, it was common for wealthy Indians to receive higher education in England, particularly when studying law. Thus, M.H. Beg joined the renowned Trinity College and Cambridge University in 1931, and earned Honours in Archaeological and Anthropological and Historical Triposes. He studied law, economics and politics at the London School of Economics. He joined the bar through the Honourable Society of Lincoln's Inn. He was called to the Bar in England in 1941.

== Judicial career ==
After graduation, M.H. Beg returned to India to begin practising as an Advocate for the Allahabad High Court, at Allahabad and Meerut. From here, M.H. Beg began working up experience in the judicial system. In 1949, he enrolled as an Advocate of the Federal Court of India, and eventually he became an Advocate of the Supreme Court of India. After building up an extensive practice on all sides he became Standing Counsel to the U.P. Sunni Central Wakf Board and appeared frequently for Municipal bodies.

Beg was raised to the Bench of the Allahabad High Court on 11 June 1963. As judge, he sat on the Criminal and Civil sides as well as on the Tax Bench. Later, he was appointed Company Judge and became in charge of the matrimonial and testamentary jurisdiction of the High Court from the middle of 1967 to 1970. Shortly after territories were redrawn and the state of Himachal Pradesh was established, M.H. Beg was appointed Chief Justice of the Himachal Pradesh High Court in January 1971.

After a short term as Chief Justice of the Himachal Pradesh High Court, Beg was elevated to Judge of the Supreme Court of India on 12 December 1971. Over the course of his Supreme Court tenure, Beg authored 194 judgments and sat on 562 benches.

By being Chief Justice of India, he also administered oath of office to 6th President of India Neelam Sanjiva Reddy.

=== Habeas Corpus case ===
Beg was also involved in the Habeas Corpus case. This landmark case in Indian democracy, Additional District Magistrate of Jabalpur v. Shiv Kant Shukla, came up in 1975 during the Indian Emergency. The legal question hinged on the citizen's right to judicial scrutiny for arrests under emergency. The five seniormost judges of the Supreme court heard the case, and four aligned with the government view that even the right to life stood suspended during emergency (only dissent was H. R. Khanna). In his April 1976 decision, Justice Beg observed:

We understand that the care and concern bestowed by the state authorities upon the welfare of detenues [sic?] who are well housed, well fed and well treated, is almost maternal.

A few months later, in January 1977, M.H. Beg, who was junior to H. R. Khanna, was appointed Chief Justice of India by the Indira Gandhi government. This was against legal tradition, though it had started with A. N. Ray's appointment. This infringement into the independence of the judiciary was widely protested; subsequent law ministers, particularly Shanti Bhushan, initiated a series of measures to bring judicial appointments within the power of the Chief Justice, and not the executive.

After Mohammad Hidayatullah, Beg was the second Muslim Chief Justice in India. After a one-year term, Beg retired in February 1978. Subsequently, Beg served as chairman of the Minorities Commission of India.

== Other works ==
While practising as an Advocate, Beg took on various faculty positions teaching various subjects:

- Professor, Constitutional Law and Equity at Meerut College (1943–1946)
- Taught Law of Evidence, Human Law, and Ancient Law at Allahabad University(1946–1963)
- Standing Counsel to the Allahabad University
- Member of the International Law Association and of the World Association of Judges

Since retirement, Beg has written two books discussing Muslim politics in India:

- Impact of Secularism on Life and Law, published in 1985
- Human Rights and Asia, published in 1978

=== Awards ===
- 1988: Padma Vibhushan India's second highest civilian award for his contribution towards Law and Public Affairs

Legal offices
Preceded by Ajit Nath Ray	Chief Justice of India; January 1977 – February 1978	Succeeded by Yeshwant Vishnu Chandrachud
