= Basic structure doctrine =

Common law legal doctrine

The basic structure doctrine is a common law doctrine holding that a sovereign state's constitution has certain characteristics that its legislature cannot alter. The doctrine is recognised in India, Bangladesh, Pakistan, and Uganda. It was developed by the Supreme Court of India in a series of constitutional law cases in the 1960s and 1970s that culminated in Kesavananda Bharati v. State of Kerala, where the doctrine was formally adopted. Bangladesh is perhaps the only legal system in the world that recognizes this doctrine in an expressed, written, and rigid constitutional manner through Article 7B of its Constitution.

In Kesavananda Bharati, Justice Hans Raj Khanna propounded that the Constitution of India contains certain basic features that cannot be altered or destroyed through amendments by the Parliament of India. Key among these "basic features", as expounded by Justice Khanna, are the fundamental rights guaranteed to individuals by the constitution. The doctrine thus forms the basis of the Supreme Court of India's power to review and strike down constitutional amendments and acts enacted by the Parliament that conflict with or seek to alter this "basic structure" of the Constitution. The basic features of the Constitution have not been explicitly defined by the Judiciary, and the determination of any particular feature as a "basic" feature is made by the Court on a case-by-case basis.

The Supreme Court's initial position on constitutional amendments had been that any part of the Constitution was amendable and that the Parliament might, by passing a Constitution Amendment Act in compliance with the requirements of article 368, amend any provision of the Constitution, including the Fundamental Rights and article 368.

In 1967, the Supreme Court reversed its earlier decisions in Golaknath v. State of Punjab. It held that Fundamental Rights included in Part III of the Constitution are given a "transcendental position" and are beyond the reach of Parliament. It also declared any amendment that "takes away or abridges" a Fundamental Right conferred by Part III as unconstitutional. In 1973, the basic structure doctrine was formally introduced with rigorous legal reasoning in Justice Hans Raj Khanna's decisive judgment in the landmark decision of Kesavananda Bharati v. State of Kerala. Previously, the Supreme Court had held that the power of Parliament to amend the Constitution was unfettered. However, in this landmark ruling, the Court adjudicated that while Parliament has "wide" powers, it did not have the power to destroy or emasculate the basic elements or fundamental features of the constitution.

Although Kesavananda was decided by a narrow margin of 7–6, the basic structure doctrine, as propounded in Justice Khanna's judgement, has since gained widespread legal and scholarly acceptance due to a number of subsequent cases and judgments relying heavily upon it to strike down Parliamentary amendments that were held to be violative of the basic structure and therefore unconstitutional. Primary among these was the imposition of a state of emergency by Indira Gandhi in 1975, and her subsequent attempt to suppress her prosecution through the 39th Amendment. When the Kesavananda case was decided, the underlying apprehension of the majority bench that elected representatives could not be trusted to act responsibly was perceived as unprecedented. However, the passage of the 39th Amendment by the Indian National Congress' majority in central and state legislatures, proved that in fact such apprehension was well-grounded. In Indira Nehru Gandhi v. Raj Narain and Minerva Mills v. Union of India, Constitution Benches of the Supreme Court used the basic structure doctrine to strike down the 39th Amendment and parts of the 42nd Amendment respectively, and paved the way for restoration of Indian democracy.

The Supreme Court's position on constitutional amendments laid out in its judgements is that Parliament can amend the Constitution but cannot destroy its "basic structure".

The basic structure doctrine was rejected by the High Court of Singapore and the Supreme Court of Papua New Guinea. It was initially also rejected by the Federal Court of Malaysia, but was later accepted by it. Conversely, the doctrine was initially approved in Belize by the Supreme Court but was later reversed on appeal by the Belize Court of Appeal.

== Definition ==
That the Constitution has "basic features" was first theorised in 1964, by Justice J.R. Mudholkar in his dissent, in the case of Sajjan Singh v. State of Rajasthan. He wrote that it is a matter for consideration

"whether making a change in a basic feature of the Constitution can be regarded merely as an amendment or would it be, in effect, rewriting a part of the Constitution; and if the latter, would it be within the purview of Article 368?"

The Supreme Court of India, through the decisive judgement of Justice Hans Raj Khanna in Keshavananda Bharti v. State of Kerala (1973) case, declared that the basic structure/features of the constitution is resting on the basic foundation of the constitution. The basic foundation of the constitution is the dignity and the freedom of its citizens which is of supreme importance and can not be destroyed by any legislation of the parliament. The basic features of the Constitution have not been explicitly defined by the Judiciary. At least, 20 features have been described as "basic" or "essential" by the Courts in numerous cases, and have been incorporated in the basic structure. Only Judiciary decides the basic features of the Constitution. In Indira Nehru Gandhi v. Raj Naraian and also in the Minerva Mills case, it was observed that the claim of any particular feature of the Constitution to be a "basic" feature would be determined by the Court in each case that comes before it. Some of the features of the Constitution termed as "basic" are listed below:

1. Supremacy of the Constitution
2. Rule of law
3. The principle of separation of powers
4. The objectives specified in the preamble to the Constitution of India
5. Judicial review
6. Articles 32 and 226
7. Federalism (including financial liberty of states under Articles 282 and 293)
8. The sovereign, democratic, republican structure
9. Freedom and dignity of the individual
10. Unity and integrity of the nation
11. The principle of equality, not every feature of equality, but the quintessence of equal justice;
12. The "essence" of other fundamental rights in Part III
13. The concept of social and economic justice — to build a welfare state: Part IV of the Constitution
14. The balance between fundamental rights and directive principles
15. The parliamentary system of government
16. The principle of free and fair elections
17. Limitations upon the amending power conferred by Article 368
18. Independence of the judiciary
19. Effective access to justice
20. Powers of the Supreme Court of India under Articles 32, 136, 141, 142

== Background ==
The Supreme Court's initial position on constitutional amendments was that no part of the Constitution was unamendable and that the Parliament might, by passing a Constitution Amendment Act in compliance with the requirements of article 368, amend any provision of the Constitution, including the Fundamental Rights and article 368. In Shankari Prasad Singh Deo v. Union of India, the Supreme Court unanimously held, "The terms of article 368 are perfectly general and empower Parliament to amend the Constitution without any exception whatever. In the context of article 13, "law" must be taken to mean rules or regulations made in exercise of ordinary legislative power and not amendments to the Constitution made in exercise of constituent power, with the result that article 13 (2) does not affect amendments made under article 368. In Sajjan Singh v. State of Rajasthan, by a majority of 3–2, the Supreme Court held, "When article 368 confers on Parliament the right to amend the Constitution, the power in question can be exercised over all the provisions of the Constitution. It would be unreasonable to hold that the word "Law" in article 13 (2) takes in Constitution Amendment Acts passed under article 368." In both cases, the power to amend the rights had been upheld on the basis of Article 368.

=== Golaknath case ===
In 1967, the Supreme Court reversed its earlier decisions in Golaknath v. State of Punjab. A bench of eleven judges (the largest ever at the time) of the Supreme Court deliberated as to whether any part of the Fundamental Rights provisions of the constitution could be revoked or limited by amendment of the constitution. The Supreme Court delivered its ruling, by a majority of 6-5 on 27 February 1967. The Court held that an amendment of the Constitution is a legislative process, and that an amendment under article 368 is "law" within the meaning of article 13 of the Constitution and therefore, if an amendment "takes away or abridges" a Fundamental Right conferred by Part III, it is void. Article 13(2) reads, "The State shall not make any law which takes away or abridges the right conferred by this Part and any law made in contravention of this clause shall, to the extent of contravention, be void." The Court also ruled that Fundamental Rights included in Part III of the Constitution are given a "transcendental position" under the Constitution and are kept beyond the reach of Parliament. The Court also held that the scheme of the Constitution and the nature of the freedoms it granted incapacitated Parliament from modifying, restricting or impairing Fundamental Freedoms in Part III. Parliament passed the 24th Amendment in 1971 to abrogate the Supreme Court ruling in the Golaknath case. It amended the Constitution to provide expressly that Parliament has the power to amend any part of the Constitution including the provisions relating to Fundamental Rights. This was done by amending articles 13 and 368 to exclude amendments made under article 368, from article 13's prohibition of any law abridging or taking away any of the Fundamental Rights. Chief Justice Koka Subba Rao writing for the majority held that:

- A law to amend the constitution is a law for the purposes of Article 13.
- Article 13 prevents the passing of laws which "take away or abridge" the Fundamental Rights provisions.
- Article 368 does not contain a power to amend the constitution but only a procedure.
- The power to amend comes from the normal legislative power of Parliament.
- Therefore, amendments which "take away or abridge" the Fundamental Rights provisions cannot be passed.

== Kesavananda Bharati case (1973) ==
Six years later in 1973, the largest ever Constitution Bench of 13 Judges, heard arguments in Kesavananda Bharati v. State of Kerala (case citation: AIR 1973 SC 1461). The Supreme Court reviewed the decision in Golaknath v. State of Punjab, and considered the validity of the 24th, 25th, 26th and 29th Amendments. The Court held, by a margin of 7–6, that although no part of the constitution, including fundamental rights, was beyond the amending power of Parliament (thus overruling the 1967 case), the "basic structure of the Constitution could not be abrogated even by a constitutional amendment". The decision of the Judges is complex, consisting of multiple opinions taking up one complete volume in the law reporter "Supreme Court Cases". The findings included the following:

- All of the Judges held that the 24th, 25th and 29th Amendments Acts are valid.
- Ten judges held that Golak Nath's case was wrongly decided and that an amendment to the Constitution was not a "law" for the purposes of Article 13.
- Seven judges held that the power of amendment is plenary and can be used to amend all the articles of the constitution (including the Fundamental Rights).
- Seven judges held (six judges dissenting on this point) that "the power to amend does not include the power to alter the basic structure of the Constitution so as to change its identity".
- Seven judges held (two judges dissenting, one leaving this point open) that "there are no inherent or implied limitations on the power of amendment under Article 368".

Nine judges (including two dissenters) signed a statement of summary for the judgment that reads:

1. Golak Nath's case is over-ruled.
2. Article 368 does not enable Parliament to alter the basic structure or framework of the Constitution.
3. The Constitution (Twenty-fourth Amendment) Act, 1971 is valid.
4. Section 2(a) and 2(b) of the Constitution (Twenty-fifth Amendment) Act, 1971 is valid.
5. The first part of section 3 of the Constitution (Twenty-fifth Amendment) Act, 1971 is valid. The second part namely "and no law containing a declaration that it is for giving effect to such policy shall be called in question in any court on the ground that it does not give effect to such policy" is invalid.
6. The Constitution (Twenty-ninth Amendment) Act, 1971 is valid.

The ruling thus established the principle that the basic structure cannot be amended on the grounds that a power to amend is not a power to destroy.

=== Defining the basic structure ===
The majority had differing opinions on what the "basic structure" of the Constitution comprised

Chief Justice Sarv Mittra Sikri, writing for the majority, indicated that the basic structure consists of the following:

- The supremacy of the constitution.
- A republican and democratic system.
- The secular character of the Constitution.
- Maintenance of the separation of powers.
- The federal character of the Constitution.

Justices Shelat and Grover in their opinion added three features to the Chief Justice's list:

- The mandate to build a welfare state contained in the Directive Principles of State Policy.
- Maintenance of the unity and integrity of India.
- The sovereignty of the country.

Justices Hegde and Mukherjea, in their opinion, provided a separate and shorter list:

- The sovereignty of India.
- The democratic character of the polity.
- The unity of the country.
- Essential features of individual freedoms.
- The mandate to build a welfare state.

Justice Jaganmohan Reddy preferred to look at the preamble, stating that the basic features of the constitution were laid out by that part of the document, and thus could be represented by:

- A sovereign democratic republic.
- The provision of social, economic and political justice.
- Liberty of thought, expression, belief, faith and worship.
- Equality of status and opportunity.

== The Emergency (1975) ==
The Court reaffirmed and applied the basic structure doctrine in Indira Nehru Gandhi v. Raj Narain, popularly known as Election case. The constitutionality of Article 329A, which had been inserted by the 39th Amendment in 1975 was challenged in this case. Shortly after the imposition of the Emergency, a bench of thirteen judges was hastily assembled to hear the case. Presided over by Chief Justice Ajit Nath Ray, the court had to determine the degree to which amendments were restricted by the basic structure theory. Ray, who was among the dissenters in the Kesavananda Bharati case, had been promoted to Chief Justice of India on 26 April 1973, superseding three senior Judges, Shelat, Grover and Hegde (all in the majority in the same case), which was unprecedented in Indian legal history. On November 10 and 11, the team of civil libertarian barristers, led by Nanabhoy Palkhivala, argued against the Union government's application for reconsideration of the Kesavananda decision. Some of the judges accepted his argument on the very first day, the others on the next; by the end of the second day, the Chief Justice was reduced to a minority of one. On the morning of 12 November, Chief Justice Ray tersely pronounced that the bench was dissolved, and the judges rose.

The 39th Amendment attempted, among other provisions, to legitimize the election of Indira Gandhi in 1971. Article 329A put the elections of the Prime Minister and Lok Sabha Speaker outside the purview of the judiciary and provided for determination of disputes concerning their elections by an authority to be set up by a Parliamentary law. The Supreme Court struck down clauses (4) and (5) of the article 329A, which made the existing election law inapplicable to the Prime Minister's and Speaker's election, and declared the pending proceedings in respect of such elections null and void.

== Development ==
Constitutional lawyer A. G. Noorani notes that the doctrine has "now spread far and wide beyond its frontiers.", but that the eventual attribution to Dietrich Conrad is absent, who propounded the arguments in a lecture to the law faculty in the Banaras Hindu University. The argument, Noorani narrates made way to M K Nambyar who read the excerpt out in Golaknath.

Implied Limitations of the Amending Power

"Perhaps the position of the Supreme Court is influenced by the fact that it has not so far been confronted with any extreme type of constitutional amendments. It is the duty of the jurist, though, to anticipate extreme cases of conflict, and sometimes only extreme tests reveal the true nature of a legal concept. So, if for the purpose of legal discussion, I may propose some fictive amendment laws to you, could it still be considered a valid exercise of the amendment power conferred by Article 368 if a two-thirds majority changed Article 1 by dividing India into two States of Tamilnad and Hindustan proper?

"Could a constitutional amendment abolish Article 21, to the effect that forthwith a person could be deprived of his life or personal liberty without authorisation by law? Could the ruling party, if it sees its majority shrinking, amend Article 368 to the effect that the amending power rests with the President acting on the advice of the Prime Minister? Could the amending power be used to abolish the Constitution and reintroduce, let us say, the rule of a moghul emperor or of the Crown of England? I do not want, by posing such questions, to provoke easy answers. But I should like to acquaint you with the discussion which took place on such questions among constitutional lawyers in Germany in the Weimar period - discussion, seeming academic at first, but suddenly illustrated by history in a drastic and terrible manner."

— http://www.frontline.in/static/html/fl1809/18090950.htm

The note is that in Kesavananda Bharati the dissenting judge, Justice Khanna, approved as "substantially correct" the following observations by Conrad:

Any amending body organised within the statutory scheme, howsoever verbally unlimited its power, cannot by its very structure change the fundamental pillars supporting its constitutional authority.

— Limitation of Amendment Procedures and the Constituent Power; Indian Year Book of International Affairs, 1966–1967, Madras, pp. 375-430

== Evolution of the doctrine ==
The basic structure doctrine was further clarified in Minerva Mills v. Union of India. The 42nd Amendment had been enacted by the government of Indira Gandhi in response to the Kesavananda Bharati judgment in an effort to reduce the power of the judicial review of constitutional amendments by the Supreme Court. In the Minerva Mills case, Nanabhoy Palkhivala successfully moved the Supreme Court to declare sections 4 and 55 of the 42nd Amendment as unconstitutional. The constitutionality of sections 4 and 55 of the 42nd Amendment were challenged in this case, when Charan Singh was caretaker Prime Minister. Section 4 of the 42nd Amendment, had amended Article 31C of the Constitution to accord precedence to the Directive Principles of State Policy articulated in Part IV of the Constitution over the Fundamental Rights of individuals articulated in Part III. Section 55 prevented any constitutional amendment from being "called in question in any Court on any ground". It also declared that there would be no limitation whatever on the constituent power of Parliament to amend by way of definition, variation or repeal the provisions of the Constitution. On 31 July 1980, when Indira Gandhi was back in power, the Supreme Court declared sections 4 & 55 of the 42nd amendment as unconstitutional. It further endorsed and evolved the basic structure doctrine of the Constitution. As had been previously held through the basic structure doctrine in the Kesavananda case, the Court ruled that Parliament could not by amending the constitution convert limited power into an unlimited power (as it had purported to do by the 42nd amendment).

In the judgement on section 55, Chief Justice Yeshwant Vishnu Chandrachud wrote,

Since the Constitution had conferred a limited amending power on the Parliament, the Parliament cannot under the exercise of that limited power enlarge that very power into an absolute power. Indeed, a limited amending power is one of the basic features of our Constitution and therefore, the limitations on that power can not be destroyed. In other words, Parliament can not, under Article 368, expand its amending power so as to acquire for itself the right to repeal or abrogate the Constitution or to destroy its basic and essential features. The donee of a limited power cannot by the exercise of that power convert the limited power into an unlimited one.

The ruling was widely welcomed in India, and Gandhi did not challenge the verdict. In the judgement on Section 4, Chandrachud wrote:

Three Articles of our Constitution, and only three, stand between the heaven of freedom into which Tagore wanted his country to awake and the abyss of unrestrained power. They are Articles 14, 19 and 21. Article 31C has removed two sides of that golden triangle which affords to the people of this country an assurance that the promise held forth by the preamble will be performed by ushering an egalitarian era through the discipline of fundamental rights, that is, without emasculation of the rights to liberty and equality which alone can help preserve the dignity of the individual.

This latter view of Article 31C was questioned, but not overturned, in Sanjeev Coke Manufacturing Co v Bharat Cooking Coal Ltd. The concept of basic structure has since been developed by the Supreme Court in subsequent cases, such as Waman Rao v. Union of India, Bhim Singhji v. Union of India, S.P. Gupta v. President of India (known as Transfer of Judges case), S.P. Sampath Kumar v. Union of India, P. Sambamurthy v. State of Andhra Pradesh, Kihota Hollohon v. Zachilhu and others, L. Chandra Kumar v. Union of India and others , P. V. Narsimha Rao v. State (CBI/SPE), I.R. Coelho v. State of Tamil Nadu and others, and Raja Ram Pal v. The Hon'ble Speaker, Lok Sabha and others (known as Cash for Query case).

The Supreme Court's position on constitutional amendments laid out in its judgements is that Parliament can amend the Constitution but cannot destroy its "basic structure".

The doctrine was discussed at the VK4.0 conclave in Mumbai in January 2026.

== Recognition ==
Aside from India, the basic structure doctrine has been adopted in a number of jurisdictions, and rejected in some others.

=== Bangladesh ===
The basic structure doctrine was adopted by the Supreme Court of Bangladesh in 1989, by expressly relying on the reasoning in the Kesavananda case, in its ruling on Anwar Hossain Chowdhary v. Bangladesh. However, Bangladesh is the only legal system to introduce this concept through constitutional provisions. Article 7B of the Constitution of Bangladesh introduced some parts of it as basic provisions of the constitution and referred to some others (which are not properly defined) as basic structure of the constitution and declares all of these as not amendable.

=== Belize ===
The basic structure doctrine was invoked by the Supreme Court of Judicature of Belize in Bowen v Attorney General in rejecting the Belize Constitution (Sixth Amendment) Bill 2008, which had sought to exclude certain deprivation of property rights from judicial review. The court recognised the fundamental rights granted by the constitution, respect for the rule of law and the right to the ownership of private property as basic features of the Belizean constitution, as well as the separation of powers, which Chief Justice Abdulai Conteh noted had been recognised by the Judicial Committee of the Privy Council in Hinds v The Queen (which was not a constitutional amendment case) as implicit in Westminster model constitutions in the Caribbean Commonwealth realm.

The Supreme Court affirmed the doctrine in British Caribbean Bank Ltd v AG Belize and struck down parts of the Belize Telecommunications (Amendment) Act 2011 and Belize Constitution (Eighth) Amendment Act 2011. The amendments had sought to preclude the court from deciding on whether deprivation of property by the government was for a public purpose, and to remove any limits on the National Assembly's power to alter the constitution. This was found to impinge on the separation of powers, which had earlier been identified as part of the basic structure of the Belizean constitution.

On appeal, the Court of Appeal reversed the decision of the Supreme Court, ruling that "the so-called basic structure doctrine is not a part of the law of Belize and does not apply to the Belize Constitution".

=== Cyprus ===
The Cypriot Supreme Court used the basic structure doctrine on 29 October 2020, in ΚΛΟΓΟΔΙΚΕΙΟ ΚΥΠΡΟΥ, ΑΝΔΡΕΑΣ ΜΙΧΑΗΛΙΔΗΣ κ.α. v. ΓΕΝΙΚΟΥ ΕΦΟΡΟΥ ΕΚΛΟΓΗΣ κ.α., 29 Οκτωβρίου 2020, (Εκλογική Αίτηση Αρ. 1/2019), to declare unconstitutional a constitutional amendment that modified the election legal framework.

=== Israel ===
The Supreme Court of Israel in majority judgement on January 1, 2024 ruled against an amendment passed by Parliament in July, 2023 which scrapped the “reasonableness” clause, used by the court to overturn government decisions deemed unconstitutional, on the ground that “this does severe and unprecedented damage to the basic characteristics of the State of Israel as a democratic state,”.

=== Malaysia ===
In Malaysia, the basic features doctrine was initially found to be inapplicable by the Federal Court in Phang Chin Hock v. Public Prosecutor. The Court remarked that the Indian constitution was drafted by a constituent assembly representative of the Indian people in territorial, racial and community terms, and not "ordinary mortals", while the same could not be said for the Malaysian constitution, which was enacted by an ordinary legislature.

The basic structure doctrine was first cited with approval by the Federal Court in obiter dicta in Sivarasa Rasiah v. Badan Peguam Malaysia, before ultimately being applied by the same court in Semenyih Jaya Sdn Bhd v. Pentadbir Tanah Daerah Hulu Langat & Ano'r Case and Indira Gandhi a/p Mutho v. Pengarah Jabatan Agama Islam Perak & 2 O'rs & 2 Other Cases. In those cases, the Federal Court held that the vesting of the judicial power of the Federation in the civil courts formed part of the basic structure of the Constitution, and could not be removed even by constitutional amendment.

=== Papua New Guinea ===
The Supreme Court of Papua New Guinea found that the basic structure doctrine was not applicable in Papua New Guinea as part of a 2010 judgment on an organic law, referring to it as a "foreign doctrine".

=== Pakistan ===
The basic structure doctrine was recognised in Constitution Petition No.12 of 2010, etc. by the Supreme Court of Pakistan in 2015. The case was heard by the full 17-member bench, of which a plurality of 8 accepted the basic structure doctrine as a basis for limiting the ability of the Parliament of Pakistan to amend the Constitution, 4 rejected the premise of such limitations, describing the basic structure doctrine as a "vehicle for judicial aggrandisement of power", and 5 accepted that some limitations exist but did not endorse the basic structure doctrine. The judgement identified democracy, federalism and independence of the judiciary as among the characteristics protected by the doctrine.

Before this decision, it was unclear whether the basic structure doctrine applied in Pakistan. The doctrine was considered and rejected shortly after the Kesavananda decision, revived in 1997, and rejected again in 1998. The 2015 decision addressed the issue directly and accepted the doctrine.

=== Singapore ===
The High Court of Singapore denied the application of the basic features doctrine in Singapore in Teo Soh Lung v. Minister for Home Affairs. Justice Frederick Arthur Chua held that the doctrine was not applicable to the Singapore Constitution: "Considering the differences in the making of the Indian and our Constitution, it cannot be said that our Parliament's power to amend our Constitution is limited in the same way as the Indian Parliament's power to amend the Indian Constitution."

=== Uganda ===
In December 2017, the Ugandan parliament passed a Constitutional Amendment which removed the age limit of 75 years for the President and Chairpersons of the Local Council. President Yoweri Museveni, who has been President of Uganda since 1986 and aged 74 at the time of signing, signed the amendment into law in January 2018. Several opposition leaders and the Uganda Law Society, challenged the constitutionality of the amendment before the Constitutional Court, which (majority) upheld the validity of the amendment. Taking note of the judgments in Kesavananda Bharati v. State of Kerala and Minerva Mills v. Union of India, the Supreme Court of Uganda in Mabirizi Kiwanuka & ors. v. Attorney General unanimously upheld the Constitutional Court (majority) finding.

== See also ==
- Judicial activism in India
- Liberal democratic basic order
- Entrenched clause
- Unconstitutional constitutional amendment

== Bibliography ==
- The Basic Structure of the Indian Constitution. Human Rights Initiative.
- H M Seervai, 'Constitutional Law of India'
- V.N. Shukla 'Constitution of India' 10th edition
- Legitimacy of the basic structure. The Hindu.
- Anuranjan Sethi (October 25, 2005), 'Basic Structure Doctrine: Some Reflections". SSRN 835165
- Conrad, Dietrich, Law and Justice, United Lawyers Association, New Delhi (Vol. 3, Nos. 1–4; pages 99–114)
- Conrad, Dietrich, Limitation of Amendment Procedures and the Constituent Power; Indian Year Book of International Affairs, 1966–1967, Madras, pp. 375–430
