= ADM Jabalpur v. Shivkant Shukla =

1976 Supreme Court of India case on The Emergency

- Court: Supreme Court of India
- Full case name: Additional District Magistrate, Jabalpur v. Shivkant Shukla
- Citation: AIR 1976 SC 1207

Case history
- Subsequent action: Overruled by Puttuswamy v. Union of India

Court membership
- Judges sitting: A.N. Ray, M.H. Beg, Hans Raj Khanna, Y.V. Chandrachud and P. N. Bhagwati

Case opinions
- Decision by: A.N. Ray, M.H. Beg, Y.V. Chandrachud, P. N. Bhagwati and Hans Raj Khanna
- Concurrence: A.N. Ray, M.H. Beg, Y.V. Chandrachud and P. N. Bhagwati
- Dissent: Hans Raj Khanna

Laws applied
- Overruled by
- Puttaswamy v. Union of India (2017)

ADM Jabalpur v. Shivkant Shukla, AIR 1976 SC 1207, was a landmark judgement of the Supreme Court of India pertaining to the suspension of Articles 21 and 226 of the Indian Constitution in the event of a National Emergency. This controversial judgment of P.N. Bhagwati, decreed during the emergency from 25 June 1975 to 21 March 1977, held that a person's right to not be unlawfully detained (i.e. habeas corpus) can be suspended in the interest of the State. This judgment received a lot of criticism since it reduced the importance attached to Fundamental Rights under the Indian Constitution. Going against the previous decisions of High Courts, the bench which included P. N. Bhagwati concluded by a majority 4:1 in favour of the then Indira Gandhi government while only Justice Hans Raj Khanna was opposed to it. Bhagwati openly praised Indira Gandhi during the Emergency period, later criticized her when Janata Party-led government was formed and again backed Gandhi when she got re-elected to form government in 1980. Bhagwati was criticized for these change of stands, favouring the ruling government, which were deemed as to have been taken to better his career prospects. Bhagwati later in 2011 agreed with popular opinion that this judgement was short-sighted and apologised.

== Dissent ==
Justice Hans Raj Khanna was the sole dissenter among the five judges. In retaliation for his dissent, he was later overlooked during the appointment of the Chief Justice.

== Reception ==
According to Ajay Kumar of Firstpost, "the judgment has been viewed as a stain on the legacy of the court for many years. The ratio decidendi (rationale behind the judgment) that all rights under our Constitution are a positive creation of law rather than merely recognised greatly increases the power of the State to do what it likes with them."

== Overruled ==
The ADM Jabalpur case was overruled on the doctrinal grounds concerning the rights by the Puttaswamy v. Union of India delivered by a nine judge, constitutional bench of the Supreme court. At the paragraph 119 of the majority opinion the Court had ruled:

"The judgments rendered by all the four judges constituting the majority in Additional District Magistrate, Jabalpur are seriously flawed. Life and personal liberty are inalienable to human existence. These rights are, as recognised in Kesavananda Bharati, primordial rights. They constitute rights under natural law.

The human element in the life of the individual is integrally founded on the sanctity of life. Dignity is associated with liberty and freedom. No civilised state can contemplate an encroachment upon life and personal liberty without the authority of law.

"Neither life nor liberty are bounties conferred by the State nor does the Constitution create these rights.

"The right to life has existed even before the advent of the Constitution. In recognising the right, the Constitution does not become the sole repository of the right. It would be preposterous to suggest that a democratic Constitution without a Bill of Rights would leave individuals governed by the State without either the existence of the right to live or the means of enforcement of the right. The right to life being inalienable to each individual, it existed prior to the Constitution and continued in force under Article of the Constitution.

"Justice Khanna was clearly right in holding that the recognition of the right to life and personal liberty under the Constitution does not denude the existence of that right, apart from it nor can there be a fatuous assumption that in adopting the Constitution the people of India surrendered the most precious aspect of the human persona, namely, life, liberty and freedom to the State on whose mercy these rights would depend. Such a construct is contrary to the basic foundation of the rule of law which imposes restraints upon the powers vested in the modern state when it deals with the liberties of the individual.

"The power of the Court to issue a writ of habeas corpus is a precious and undeniable feature of the rule of law."

== Sources ==
- Lawlex.org: Case summary ADM Jabalpur v. Shivkant Shukla
- Legalbites.in: ADM Jabalpur v. Shivkant Shukla - Habeas corpus
- Law Times Journal: ADM Jabalpur v. Shivkant Shukla (1976) SCC 521 - Case Summary (12 July 2018, Chiranjeeb Prateek Mohanty)
- LawSisto.com: Case Analysis: ADM Jabalpur v. Shivkant Shukla(Surya J M, 15 December 2020)
- The Wire: An Outrageous Emergency-Era Supreme Court Judgment That Still Stands, Technically (28 June 2017)

This article incorporates text from judicial opinions and related texts from the Supreme Court of India. As a work of the Supreme Court, the text is in the public domain.
