= S. N. Dwivedi =

Indian Judge (1913-1974)

Hon'ble Justice S. N. Dwivedi

Judge of Supreme Court of India
- In office 14 August 1972 – 8 December 1974
- Nominated by: Sarv Mittra Sikri
- Appointed by: V. V. Giri

Judge of Allahabad High Court
- In office 12 May 1959 – 13 August 1972
- Nominated by: Sudhi Ranjan Das
- Appointed by: Rajendra Prasad

Personal details
- Born: Surendra Narayan Dwivedi; 1 October 1913 Hamirpur, Uttar Pradesh
- Died: 8 December 1974 (aged 61) New Delhi, India
- Education: B.A. and LL.B
- Alma mater: Ewing Christian College, University of Lucknow

Surendra Narayan Dwivedi (1 October 1913 - 8 December 1974) was a judge of the Supreme Court of India and also of Allahabad High Court.

== Life and work ==
He completed his matriculation from a Government High School, Hamirpur, pursued BA, and then LLB, and studied at Ewing Christian College, Allahabad, and the University of Lucknow. He was enrolled as a pleader in 1937, and as an advocate in October 1943. He had a substantial civil practice.

Dwivedi worked as junior standing council from November 1954 to December 1955. He served at the High Court of Judicature at Allahabad from 2 May 1959 to 14 August 1972.

He was elevated as a judge of the Supreme Court on 14 August 1972 and served until 8 December 1974. He died of cancer while in office in 1974. He was due to retire on 30 September 1978.

His son Rakesh Dwivedi, practices as a senior lawyer for the Supreme Court of India and his granddaughter, Divya Dwivedi is a professor at the Indian Institute of Technology, Delhi.
