= K. S. Hegde Medical Academy =

Medical college in Mangaluru, India

K.S. Hegde Medical Academy
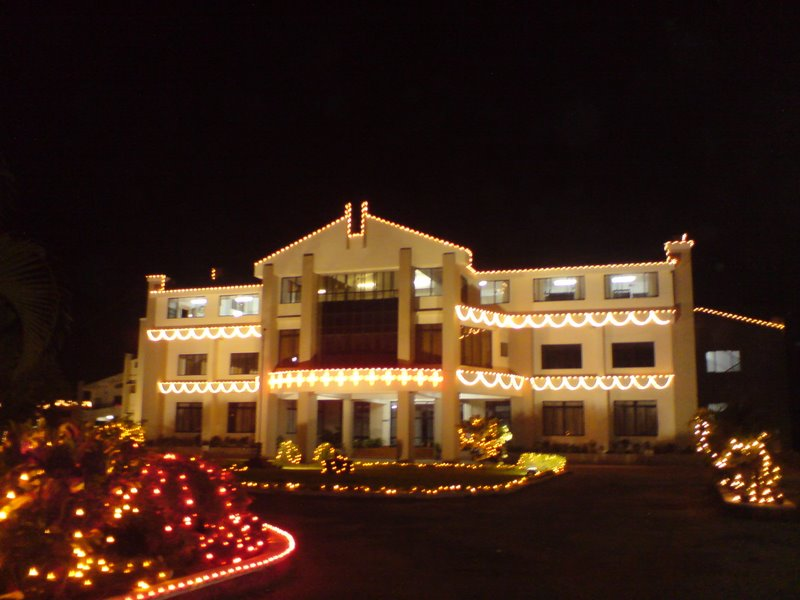
- Front view of K S Hegde Medical Academy
- Motto: Long life ahead
- Type: Private Medical College and Hospital
- Established: 1999
- Affiliations: NITTE University
- Dean: P. S. Prakash
- Location: Mangaluru, Karnataka, India; 12°52′10.1″N 74°50′33.4″E
- Website: kshema.nitte.edu.in

K.S. Hegde Medical Academy (KSHEMA) is a medical college in Deralakatte, near the city of Mangaluru. It is managed by the Nitte Education Trust, which runs a number of professional colleges in the state of Karnataka. The college offers the MBBS course along with post-graduation courses. The academy was affiliated to Rajiv Gandhi University of Health Sciences till 2009. Now it is affiliated to NITTE (Deemed to be) University.

== Campus ==
The KS Hegde Medical Academy is located at Deralakatte, a town about 13 km from Mangalore. The full-fledged academy is spread over 2.5 acres (10,000 m^{2}) of land.

== History ==
K S Hegde Medical Academy was established in 1999 by the Nitte Education Trust. The college is named after the visionary and founder, late Justice K. S. Hegde, former Justice of the Supreme Court of India and former Speaker of the Lok Sabha and social worker

== Department ==
- Anesthesiology
- Anatomy
- Biochemistry
- Community Medicine
- Dermatology
- Otorhinolaryngology
- Forensic Medicine
- General Medicine
- General Surgery
- Microbiology
- Neuroscience
- Obstetrics & Gynecology
- Ophthalmology
- Orthopedics
- Pediatrics
- Pathology
- Pharmacology
- Physiology
- Psychiatry
- Radio diagnosis & Imaging
- TB, Chest and Respiratory Diseases

== Sister institute ==
- A B Shetty College of dental sciences (managed by Nitte education trust)
- Nitte Usha Institute of Nursing Sciences

== Admissions ==
=== Undergraduate course ===
Since 2019 admissions under the General Merit category are being conducted via centralised single window counselling on the basis of merit (rank) obtained in the All India Entrance Test, National Eligibility cum Entrance Test (NEET), conducted by NTA.

== Courses offered ==
=== UG course ===
M.B.B.S. (4½ year course + 1 year medical internship)

=== PG courses ===
==== M.D. ====
- Nanotechnology
- Anatomy
- Physiology
- Forensic Medicine
- Biochemistry
- Pharmacology
- Pathology
- Microbiology
- Community medicine
- General Medicine
- Dermatology
- Psychiatry
- Pediatrics
- Anesthesiology
- Radiology

==== M.S. ====
- General Surgery
- Ophthalmology
- Orthopaedics
- Obstetrics and gynecology
- ENT

== International collaborations ==
KSHEMA has signed an agreement of co-operation with The University of Texas Health Science Center at Houston, USA for co-operation in research, in diseases like malaria and tuberculosis. The college has established a state-of-the-art regional research centre on communicable diseases in collaboration with the University of Texas Health Sciences, on the campus. The institute also has a staff exchange and training programme with Maimonides Medical Center, Brooklyn, USA.

== Recent developments ==
The college hospital recently opened a super specialty block for Nuclear Medicine, Cardiology, Neurology, Neurosurgery, Cardiothoracic Surgery, Paediatric Surgery, Urology, Nephrology, Plastic Surgery, Gastroenterology and Oncology.

== Rankings ==
Medical college rankings
- Private colleges
- Outlook India (2022): 14

KSHEMA was ranked 14 among private medical colleges in India in 2022 by Outlook India.
