= Nani Palkhivala =

Indian jurist and economist

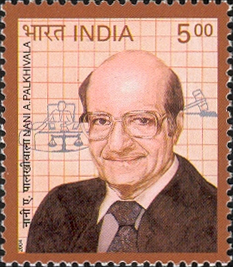
- Palkhivala on a 2004 stamp of India
- Born: 16 January 1920; Bombay, Bombay Presidency, British India
- Died: 11 December 2002 (aged 82); Mumbai, India
- Occupations: Jurist, Economist
- Writing career
- Period: 20th century

Nanabhoy "Nani" Ardeshir Palkhivala (16 January 1920 – 11 December 2002) was an Indian lawyer and jurist. He rose to prominence as lead counsel in several landmark constitutional cases before the Supreme Court of India, including Kesavananda Bharati v. The State of Kerala, I.C. Golaknath and Ors. v. State of Punjab and Anrs. and Minerva Mills v. Union of India. His role in these cases earned him international recognition and established his reputation as one of India's most distinguished lawyers.

Palkhivala is known to have espoused liberal values, advocating limited government, individual rights and "liberal economic thinking". From 1977 to 1979, Palkhivala served as India's Ambassador to the United States.

== Early years ==
Nani Palkhivala was born in 1920 in Bombay in what was then the Bombay Presidency. His family name is derived from the profession of his forefathers (a common practice among Parsis), who were manufacturers of palanquins ("palkhis").

He received his early education at Masters Tutorial High School, and later attended St. Xavier's College, Bombay. He was reported to have had a stammer. He possesses a master's degree in English Literature.

Following graduation, Palkhivala sought an academic career and applied for a lectureship at Bombay University, which he did not attain. He also attempted to secure admission into advanced programs at other institutions of higher learning to further his academic career. Eventually he enrolled at Government Law College, Bombay.

== Entry to the bar ==
In 1946, Nani Palkhivala was called to the Bar Association and commenced practice in the chambers of Sir Jamshedji Behramji Kanga in Bombay. He gained recognition as an eloquent and persuasive barrister, frequently attracting attention in court proceedings. His advocacy drew law students and junior members of the Bar, who often attended hearings to observe his performance.

Palkhivala's initial focus was commercial and tax law. He is known to be one of the few voices of his time to be supportive of a reduction in taxation to promote economic growth. Together with Sir Jamshedji, he authored what was then and still is considered to be an authoritative reference tool for tax professionals: The Law and Practice of Income Tax Sir Jamshedji later admitted that the credit for this work belonged exclusively to Palkhivala.

== Legal career ==
Palkhivala was widely regarded for his deep respect for the Constitution of India and the principles it embodied. He viewed the Constitution as both a legacy to be honoured and a framework that should evolve with societal progress, famously citing Thomas Jefferson that it must proceed “hand in hand with the progress of the human mind.” He opposed politically motivated constitutional amendment, drawing on Joseph Story's observation that "the Constitution has been reared for immortality...[but] may nevertheless perish in an hour by the folly, or corruption, or negligence of its only keepers, the people."

As he later stated in the Privy Purse case H. H. Maharajadhiraja Madhav Rao Jiwaji vs Union Of India "The survival of our democracy and the unity and integrity of the nation depend upon the realisation that constitutional morality is no less essential than constitutional legality. Dharma (righteousness; sense of public duty or virtue) lives in the hearts of public men; when it dies there, no Constitution, no law, no amendment, can save it."

He was a strong proponent of the rights of freedom of expression and freedom of the press. In an attempt to stifle dissenting opinion, the central government imposed import controls on newsprint in 1972. In the Supreme Court case, Bennett Coleman & Co. vs Union of India, Palkhivala unsuccessfully opposed the nationalization of Indian banks, he argued that newsprint was more than just a general commodity: "Newsprint does not stand on the same footing as steel. Steel will yield products of steel. Newsprint will manifest whatever is thought of by man."

During the 1970s, state legislations increasingly sought to regulate minority educational institutions, whose rights are safeguarded under the India Constitution. In the landmark case of Ahmedabad St. Xavier's College Society v. State of Gujarat, Palkhivala contended that while the state possesses the authority to regulate the administration of such institutions, this authority does not extend to permitting maladministration. A majority of the nine-judge bench upheld his argument, thereby reinforcing constitutional protections for minority institutions and significantly strengthening their autonomy.

== Criticism of Indian Government ==
In his later years, Palkhivala grew increasingly critical of India's governance and administrative structures. He characterized the state apparatus as excessively large yet ineffective, arguing that it failed to deliver on essential objectives such as raising living standards, advancing privatization of public sector enterprises, and addressing population growth. In 1990, he observed that “the most persistent tendency in India is to have too much government but too little administration; too many laws and too little justice; too many public servants and too little public service; too many controls and too little welfare.”

In a Rediff interview with Archana Masih, he says, "We have no reverence for our Constitution. Our Constitution has been amended no less than 78 times in 50 years, unlike the United States Constitution, which is regarded by the Americans with such reverence that it has been amended only 27 times in 209 years. It is my firm conviction that it is not the Constitution which has failed the people but it is our chosen representatives who have failed the Constitution."

== The economist ==
Starting in 1958, every year, following the presentation of the Union Budget in Parliament, Palkhivala delivered public lectures critically analyzing its contents. These came to be popularly known as "post - Budget speeches" organized by Forum of Free Enterprise, and they attracted vast crowds, so the venues were repeatedly upgraded, culminating in a gathering at Bombay's Braboune Stadium in 1983, to accommodate his growing audience.

Describing the Annual Budget meetings, Indian jurist Soli Sorabjee states: "The audience in these meetings was drawn from industrialists, lawyers, businessmen and the common individual. Nani's speeches were fascinating for their brevity and clarity. His Budget speeches became so popular throughout India, and the audience for them grew so large that bigger halls and later the Brabourne Stadium in Bombay had to be booked to keep pace with the demand of an audience of over 20,000. It was aptly said that in those days there were two Budget speeches, one by the Finance Minister and the other by Nani Palkhivala, and Palkhivala's speech was undoubtedly the more popular and sought after."

== Books authored ==
- Law and Practice of Income tax
- Taxation in India
- The Highest Taxed Nation
- Judiciary Made to Measure
- Our Constitution Defaced and Defiled
- India’s Priceless Heritage
- Essential Unity of all Religions
- We, the people
- We, the Nation

== Recognition ==
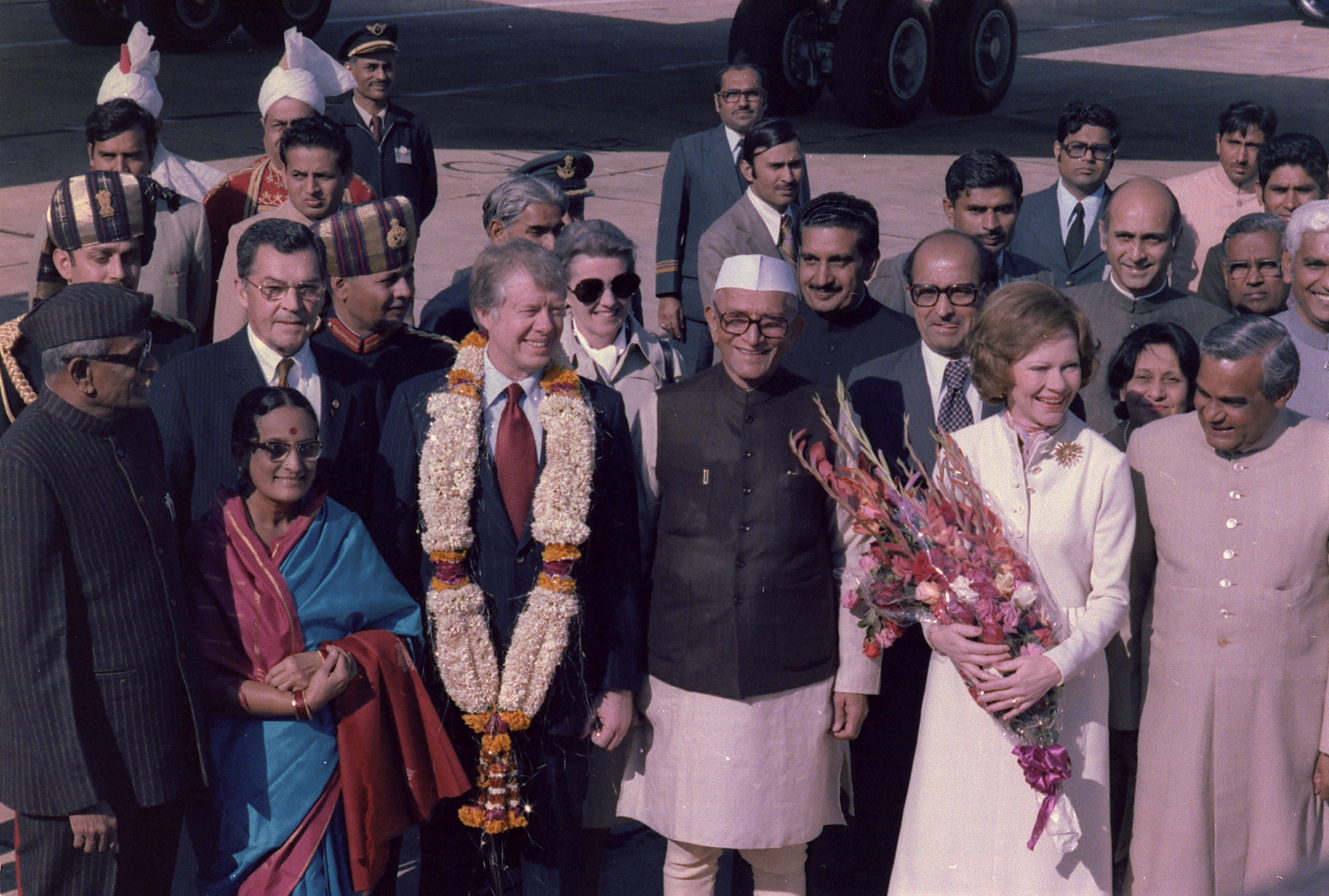
Nani Palkhivala (third from right, second row) with US President Jimmy Carter during his 1978 visit to India.

In 1963, Palkhivala was offered judgeship in the Supreme Court, but declined.

In 1968, he was offered the position of Attorney-General by Govinda Menon, then the Law Minister in the Congress Government. Palkhivala recounts in his book We the Nation: "After a great deal of hesitation I agreed. When I was in Delhi I conveyed my acceptance to him, and he told me that the announcement would be made the next day. I was happy that the agonising hours of indecision were over. Sound sleep is one of the blessings I have always enjoyed. That night I went to bed and looked forward to my usual quota of deep slumber. But suddenly and inexplicably, I became wide awake at three o'clock in the morning with the clear conviction, floating like a hook through my consciousness, that my decision was erroneous and that I should reverse it before it was too late. Early in the morning I profusely apologised to the Law Minister for changing my mind. In the years immediately following, it was my privilege to argue on behalf of the citizen, under the same Congress Government and against the government, the major cases which have shaped and moulded [...] constitutional law[...]"

Nani Palkhivala was appointed Indian Ambassador to the United States in 1977 by the Janata government (the first non-Congress Government in India) headed by Morarji Desai and served in the capacity till 1979. He received honorary doctorates from Princeton University, Rutgers University, Lawrence University, University of Wisconsin–Madison, Annamalai University, Ambedkar Law University and the University of Mumbai. The laudation from Princeton called him "... Defender of constitutional liberties, champion of human rights ...", and stated, "he has courageously advanced his conviction that expediency in the name of progress, at the cost of freedom, is no progress at all, but retrogression. Lawyer, teacher, author, and economic developer, he brings to us as Ambassador of India intelligence, good humour, experience, and vision for international understanding...."

== Final days ==
In the last years of his life, Nani Palkhivala was severely affected by what may have been Alzheimer's disease. According to former Attorney-General Soli J. Sorabjee, who had known him for many years, "it was painful to see that a person so eloquent and articulate unable to speak or recognize persons except occasionally in a momentary flash."

Nani was critically ill on 7 December 2002, and was taken to Jaslok Hospital in Mumbai. He died on 11 December 2002. He was 82.

Political offices
Preceded by Kewal Singh	Indian Ambassador to the United States; 1977–1979	Succeeded by K.R. Narayanan
