= A. N. Ray =

14th Chief Justice of India

Ajit Nath Ray
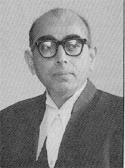

14th Chief Justice of India
- In office 26 April 1973 – 28 January 1977
- Appointed by: V. V. Giri
- Preceded by: Sarv Mittra Sikri
- Succeeded by: M. H. Beg

Judge of Supreme Court of India
- In office 1 August 1969 – 25 April 1973
- Appointed by: M. Hidayatullah (Acting President of India)

Judge of Calcutta High Court
- In office 23 December 1957 – 31 July 1969
- Nominated by: S. R. Das
- Appointed by: Rajendra Prasad

Personal details
- Born: 29 January 1912
- Died: 25 December 2009 (aged 97) Kolkata, India
- Children: Ajoy Nath Ray
- Education: B.A. and LL.B
- Alma mater: Presidency College, Calcutta, Oriel College, Oxford

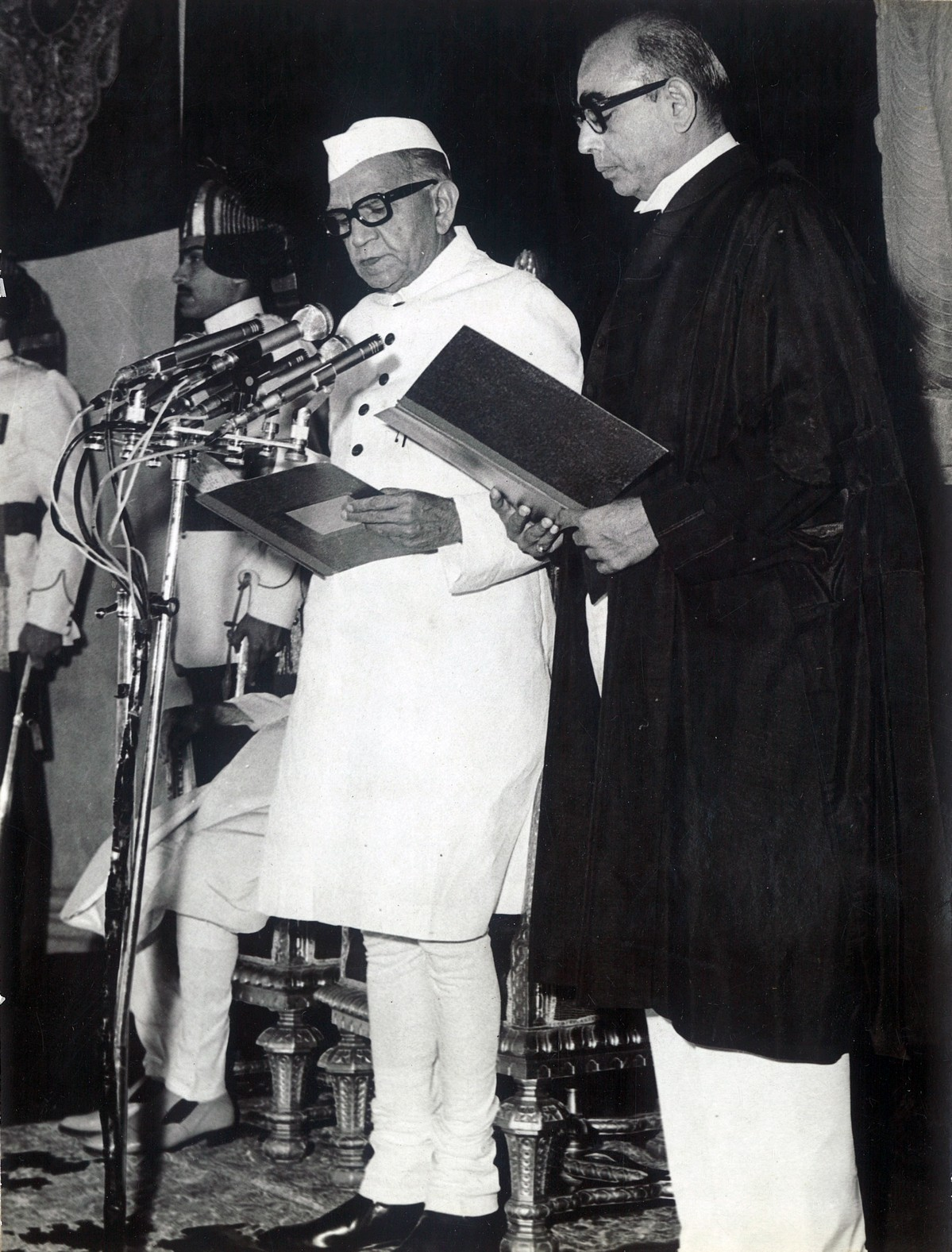
Ajit Ray administering the oath of President of India to Fakhruddin Ali Ahmed, 1974

Ajit Nath Ray (29 January 1912 – 25 December 2009) was the Chief Justice of the Supreme Court of India from 25 April 1973 till his retirement on 28 January 1977.

Ray was the lone dissenter among the eleven Supreme Court judges that examined the constitutionality of the Bank Nationalization Act, in 1969. He had come to his appointment to the Supreme Court via Presidency College, Calcutta, Oriel College, Oxford, Gray's Inn, and the Calcutta High Court. His son Justice Ajoy Nath Ray became a Chief Justice of the Allahabad High Court.

== Early life and career ==
Justice Ray was born on 29 January 1912. He was called to English Bar in 1939 and enrolled as advocate in Calcutta High Court on 1 March 1940. He was appointed as Judge in Calcutta High Court on 23 December 1957.

== Chief Justice of India ==
In August 1969, he was appointed as Judge of the Supreme Court of India, and became Chief Justice of India in April 1973.

Ajit Ray's appointment as CJI came on the heels of a dissenting opinion in the Kesavananda Bharati case which gave rise to the Basic structure doctrine of the Indian Constitution.

This appointment superseded three senior judges of the Supreme Court, Jaishanker Manilal Shelat, Amar Nath Grover and K. S. Hegde, and was viewed as an attack on the independence of the Judiciary. This was unprecedented in Indian legal history, and has been called the "blackest day in Indian democracy". It was marked by widespread protests by bar associations and legal groups across India. The protests continued for many months and on 3 May 1976 all legal groups in India observed a "Bar solidarity day" and stopped from work.

Justice Mohammad Hidayatullah (who was CJI earlier) remarked that "this was an attempt of not creating 'forward looking judges' but the 'judges looking forward' to the plumes of the office of Chief Justice". The process continued with the controversial appointment of Justice Mirza Hameedullah Beg superseding Hans Raj Khanna in 1977.

After becoming Chief Justice, A.N. Ray more than shared the government's economic viewpoint – he developed an adulatory attitude towards Prime Minister Indira Gandhi. He made himself amenable to her influence by telephoning her frequently, and also ask her personal secretary's advise on simple matters, conveying the impression that Prime Minister's views might be heard concerning an ongoing court-case.

Ultimately, the powers of the Judiciary over judicial appointments was re-established under the Morarji Desai government with Shanti Bhushan as law minister through various Constitutional amendments.

Additional District Magistrate of Jabalpur v. Shiv Kant Shukla (also known as the Habeas corpus case) was a major decision during his tenure as Chief Justice, where the Supreme Court espoused the view that no court could enforce the right to life during the imposition of Emergency. This meant that even if life were taken illegally during an Emergency, the court would stay helpless. After the Emergency was over, the 44th Amendment Act of 1978 protected the fundamental rights under Article 20 and Article 21 from being violated during an Emergency. The IR Coelho v. State of Tamil Nadu case was a landmark 2007 Supreme Court of India ruling that established the importance of judicial review and the basic structure doctrine of the Constitution. Finally, in 2017's KS Puttaswamy v. Union of India case, the Supreme Court overruled the Habeas Corpus case's majority decision.

Legal offices
Preceded by Sarv Mittra Sikri	Chief Justice of India; 25 April 1973 – 28 January 1977	Succeeded by Mirza Hameedullah Beg
