= Minerva Mills v. Union of India =

Landmark decision of the Supreme Court of India

Minerva Mills Ltd. v. Union Of India
- Court: Supreme Court of India
- Full case name: Minerva Mills Ltd. and Ors. vs Union Of India and Ors.
- Decided: 31 July 1980
- Citation: AIR 1980 SC 1789

Court membership
- Judges sitting: Y. V. Chandrachud (Chief Justice), P. N. Bhagwati, A. C. Gupta, N. L. Untwalia, P. S. Kailasam.

Case opinions
- Clause 5 of Article 368 transgresses the limitation on the amending power of Parliament and is hence unconstitutional.
- Decision by: Y. V. Chandrachud (Chief Justice)
- Concur/dissent: P. N. Bhagwati

Minerva Mills Ltd. and Ors. v. Union Of India and Ors. (case number: Writ Petition (Civil) 356 of 1977; case citation: AIR 1980 SC 1789) is a landmark decision of the Supreme Court of India that applied and evolved the basic structure doctrine of the Constitution of India.

In the Minerva Mills case, the Supreme Court provided key clarifications on the interpretation of the basic structure doctrine. The court ruled that the power of the parliament to amend the constitution is limited by the constitution. Hence the parliament cannot exercise this limited power to grant itself an unlimited power. In addition to that, a majority of the court also held that the parliament's power to amend is not a power to destroy. Hence the parliament cannot emasculate the fundamental rights of individuals, and also includes the right to liberty and equality (which is not a fundamental right but considered a basic structure of the Constitution) .

The ruling struck down clause 4 and 5 of the Constitution (Forty second Amendment) Act, 1976 enacted during the Emergency provision imposed by Prime Minister Indira Gandhi.

== Judgement ==
(5) For the removal of easy doubts, it is hereby declared that there shall be no limitation whatever on the constituent power of Parliament to amend by way of addition, variation or repeal the provisions of this Constitution under this article.

The above clauses were unanimously ruled as unconstitutional. Chief Justice Y. V. Chandrachud explained in his opinion that since, as had been previously held in Kesavananda Bharati v. State of Kerala, the power of Parliament to amend the constitution was limited, it could not by amending the constitution convert this limited power into an unlimited power (as it had purported to do by the 42nd amendment).

Since the Constitution had conferred a limited amending power on the Parliament, the Parliament cannot under the exercise of that limited power enlarge that very power into an absolute power. Indeed, a limited amending power is one of the basic features of our Constitution and therefore, the limitations on that power can not be destroyed. In other words, Parliament can not, under Article 368, expand its amending power so as to acquire for itself the right to repeal or abrogate the Constitution or to destroy its basic and essential features. The donee of a limited power cannot by the exercise of that power convert the limited power into an unlimited one.

Section 4 of the 42nd Amendment, had amended Article 31C of the Constitution to accord precedence to the Directive Principles of State Policy articulated in Part IV of the Constitution over the Fundamental Rights of individuals articulated in Part III of Indian Constitution. By a verdict of 4-1, with Justice P. N. Bhagwati dissenting, the court held section 4 of the 42nd Amendment to be unconstitutional. Chief Justice Chandrachud wrote:

Three Articles of our Constitution, and only three, stand between the heaven of freedom into which Tagore wanted his country to awake and the abyss of unrestrained power. They are Articles 14, 19 and 21. Article 31C has removed two sides of that golden triangle which affords to the people of this country an assurance that the promise held forth by the preamble will be performed by ushering an egalitarian era through the discipline of fundamental rights, that is, without emasculation of the rights to liberty and equality which alone can help preserve the dignity of the individual, added art 368(4) & art 368(5) in indian constitution.
