= Jayantilal Chhotalal Shah =

12th Chief Justice of India

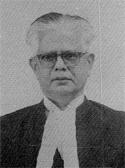

12th Chief Justice of India
- In office 17 December 1970 – 21 January 1971
- Appointed by: V. V. Giri
- Preceded by: Mohammad Hidayatullah
- Succeeded by: Sarv Mittra Sikri

Judge of Supreme Court of India
- In office 12 October 1959 – 16 December 1970
- Nominated by: Sudhi Ranjan Das
- Appointed by: Rajendra Prasad

Judge of Bombay High Court
- In office 1 March 1949 – 11 October 1959
- Appointed by: C. Rajagopalachari

Personal details
- Born: 22 January 1906 Ahmedabad, British India
- Died: 4 January 1991 (aged 84) Bombay, Maharashtra, India
- Education: Elphinstone College

Jayantilal Chhotalal Shah (22 January 1906 – 4 January 1991) was the twelfth Chief Justice of India from 17 December 1970 until his retirement on 21 January 1971. He was born in Ahmedabad.

== Early life and legal career ==
Shah attended schooling at R.C. School in Ahmedabad and subsequently studied at Elphinstone College in Bombay. He began practice as a lawyer at Ahmedabad in 1929. He was part of the legal team prosecuting Nathuram Godse and other defendants in the Gandhi assassination case. In 1949, he moved to the Bombay High Court where he was judge for 10 years. In October 1959, he was appointed judge of the Supreme Court of India, and became Chief Justice of India in December 1970. Over the course of his Supreme Court tenure, Shah authored 728 judgments and sat on 2,094 benches.

== Indian Emergency (1975–77) and Shah Commission ==
On 28 May 1977, the home ministry appointed Justice Shah, who was then a retired Chief Justice of the Supreme Court of India, to head the Shah Commission. It was set up by the central government under the Commissions of Inquiry Act, 1952 to probe excesses committed during the Emergency in India. The Shah Commission was required to look "into excesses, malpractices and misdeeds committed during the Emergency by the political authorities, public servants, their friends, and in particular allegations of gross misuse of power of arrest or detention, use of force in the implementation of the family planning programme and indiscriminate and high-handed demolition of houses, shops, buildings, etc., in the name of slum clearance."

The commission concluded that during the Emergency the provisions of the Maintenance of Internal Security Act and the Defence of India Rules were not followed but were abused in order to damage political opponents. Concerning the circumstances in which the emergency was proclaimed, the commission found that there was no economic crisis and no crisis of law and order necessitating the proclamation of Emergency. The commission decided that the decision to impose Emergency was made by prime minister Indira Gandhi alone, without consulting her cabinet colleagues, and was not justified. The report was particularly scathing of Indira Gandhi, her son Sanjay Gandhi, Pranab Mukherjee, Bansi Lal, Kamal Nath and officers belonging to civil services who helped Sanjay Gandhi. The commission concluded that during the Emergency the provisions of the Maintenance of Internal Security Act and the Defence of India Rules were not followed but were abused in order to damage political opponents.

Legal offices
Preceded by Mohammad Hidayatullah	Chief Justice of India; 17 December 1970 – 21 January 1971	Succeeded by Sarv Mittra Sikri
