= I. C. Golaknath and Others v. State of Punjab and Anothers =

1967 Supreme Court of India case

Golaknath v. State of Punjab
- Court: Supreme Court of India
- Full case name: I.C. Golaknath and Ors. vs State of Punjab and Anrs.
- Decided: 27 February 1967
- Citations: 1967 2 S.C.R. 762; 1967 INSC 45; 1967 AIR 1643;

Court membership
- Judges sitting: K. Subba Rao (Chief Justice), K.N Wanchoo, M. Hidayatullah, J.C. Shah, S. M. Sikri, R.S. Bachawat, V. Ramaswami, J.M. Shelat, Vishishtha Bhargava, G.K. Mitter, C.A. Vaidyialingam

Case opinions
- Fundamental Rights cannot be abridged or taken away by the amending procedure in Art. 368 of the Constitution. An amendment to the Constitution is 'law' within the meaning of Art. 13(2) and is therefore subject to Part III of the Constitution.
- Decision by: K. Subba Rao (Chief Justice) with J.C. Shah, S.M. Sikri, J.M. Shelat, C.A. Vaidiyalingam
- Concurrence: M. Hidayatullah
- Dissent: Justices K.N. Wanchoo, Vishistha Bhargava and G.K Mitter (writing together); R.S. Bachawat; V. Ramaswami

Laws applied
- Overruled by
- Kesavananda Bharati v. State of Kerala (1973)

Golaknath v. State Of Punjab (1967 AIR 1643, 1967 SCR (2) 762), or simply the Golaknath case, was a 1967 Indian Supreme Court case, in which the Court ruled that Parliament could not curtail any of the Fundamental Rights in the Constitution.

== Facts ==
The family of Golak Nath held over 500 acres of farmland in Jalandhar, Punjab. In the phase of the 1953 Punjab Security and Land Tenures Act, the state government held that the brothers could keep only thirty acres each, a few acres would go to tenants and the rest was declared 'surplus'. This was challenged by the Golak Nath family in the courts and the case was referred to the Supreme Court in 1965. The family filed a petition under Article 32 challenging the 1953 Punjab Act on the ground that it denied them their constitutional rights to acquire and hold property and practice any profession (Articles 19(1)(f) and 19(1)(g)) and to equality before and equal protection of the law (Article 14). They also sought to have the Seventeenth Amendment – which had placed the Punjab Act in the Ninth Schedule – declared ultra vires.

The issues involved were whether Amendment is a "law" under the meaning of Article 13(3)( a), and whether Fundamental Rights can be amended or not.

== Judgement ==
The judgement reversed Supreme Court's earlier decision which had upheld Parliament's power to amend all parts of the Constitution, including Part III related to Fundamental Rights. The judgement left Parliament with no power to curtail Fundamental Rights.

The Supreme Court, by thin majority of 6:5, held that a constitutional amendment under Article 368 of the Constitution was an ordinary 'law' within the meaning of Article 13(3) of the Constitution. The majority did not believe there was any difference between ordinary legislative power of the parliament and the inherent constituent power of parliament to amend the Constitution. The majority did not agree with the view that Article 368 of the Constitution contained "power and procedure" to amend, but instead believed that the text of Article 368 only explained the procedure to amend the constitution, the power being derived from entry 97 of the List I of the VII Schedule to the Constitution.

Since according to Article 13(2), the parliament could not make any law that abridges the Fundamental Rights contained in Part III of the Constitution, a constitutional amendment, also being an ordinary law within the meaning of Article 13, could not be in violation of the fundamental rights chapter contained in the Constitution of India. Therefore, all constitutional amendments thus far which were in contravention or which had made an exception to fundamental rights chapter of the Constitution were said to be void.

=== The Doctrine of Prospective Overruling ===
It was in this case that the then Chief Justice Koka Subba Rao had first invoked the doctrine of prospective overruling. He had taken import from American law where jurists like George F. Canfield, Robert Hill Freeman, John Henry Wigmore and Benjamin N. Cardozo had considered this doctrine to be an effective judicial tool. In the words of Canfield, the said expression means:

"........ a court should recognize a duty to announce a new and better rule for future transactions whenever the court has reached the conviction that an old rule (as established by the precedents) is unsound even though feeling compelled by stare decisis to apply the old and condemned rule to the instant case and to transactions which had already taken place".

Taking cue from such formulation, Justice Subba Rao used this doctrine to preserve the constitutional validity of the Constitution (Seventeenth Amendment) Act, legality of which had been challenged. He drew protective cover offered by the doctrine over the impugned amendments while manifestly holding that the impugned amendments abridged the scope of fundamental rights. Justifying his stand, he held that:

What then is the effect of our conclusion on the instant case? Having regard to the history of the amendments, their impact on the social and economic affairs of our country and the chaotic situation that may be brought about by the sudden withdrawal at this stage of the amendments from the Constitution, we think that considerable judicial restraint is called for. We, therefore, declare that our decisions will not affect the validity of the constitution (Seventeenth Amendment) Act, 1964, or other amendments made to the Constitution taking away or abridging the fundamental rights. We further declare that in future Parliament will have no power to amend Part III of the Constitution so as to take away or abridge the fundamental rights.

=== Minority view ===
The judges who delivered the minority judgement in the Golaknath case dissented with the view of the invocation of the doctrine of prospective overruling. They seemed to rest their argument on the traditional Blackstonian theory, where they said that courts declare law and a declaration being the law of the land takes effect from the date the law comes into force. They further said that it would be loathsome to change the above principle and supersede it by the doctrine of prospective overruling. It is submitted here that the doctrine of prospective overruling in anyway does not supersede the already existing doctrine but simply tries to enrich the existing and rather complex practice with regard to the effects of new judicial decisions, by the adoption of an alternative discretionary device to be employed in appropriate cases. So, the basic characteristics of the above doctrine are the flexibility of content and fitfulness of occurrence.

== Significance ==
Parliament passed the 24th Amendment in 1971 to abrogate the Supreme Court judgement. It amended the Constitution to provide expressly that Parliament has the power to amend any part of the Constitution including the provisions relating to Fundamental Rights. This was done by amending articles 13 and 368 to exclude amendments made under article 368, from article 13's prohibition of any law abridging or taking away any of the Fundamental Rights.

In 1973, the Supreme Court in the landmark case of Kesavananda Bharati v. State of Kerala held that the Parliament under the Indian Constitution is not supreme, in that it cannot change the basic structure of the constitution. It also declared that in certain circumstances, the amendment of fundamental rights would affect the basic structure and therefore, would be void. Thus, one can see that this case is drawn on a larger canvas as compared to that of Golaknath. It also overruled Golaknath and thus, all the previous amendments which were held valid are now open to be reviewed. They can also be sustained on the ground that they do not affect the basic structure of the constitution or on the fact that they are reasonable restrictions on the fundamental rights in public interest. Both the cases, if seen closely, bear the same practical effects. What Golaknath said was that the Parliament cannot amend so as to take away the fundamental rights enshrined in Part III, whereas in Keshavananda, it was held that it cannot amend so as to affect the basic structure.

== See also ==
- Indian law
- Kesavananda Bharati v. State of Kerala
