= S. M. Sikri =

13th Chief Justice of India

Hon'ble Justice S. M. Sikri
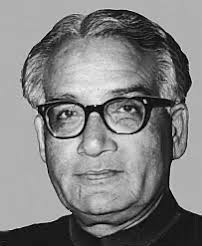

13th Chief Justice of India
- In office 22 January 1971 – 25 April 1973
- Appointed by: V. V. Giri
- Preceded by: J. C. Shah
- Succeeded by: Ajit Nath Ray

Judge of the Supreme Court of India
- In office 3 February 1964 – 25 April 1973
- Nominated by: P. B. Gajendragadkar
- Appointed by: Sarvepalli Radhakrishnan

Advocate General for Punjab
- In office 1 November 1956 – 2 February 1964
- Appointed by: Chandeshwar Prasad Narayan Singh
- Preceded by: office established
- Succeeded by: S. K. Kapur

Personal details
- Born: 26 April 1908 Kabirwala, Punjab
- Died: 24 September 1992 (aged 84)
- Education: Trinity College, Cambridge

Sarv Mittra Sikri (26 April 1908 – 24 September 1992) was an Indian lawyer and judge who served as the 13th Chief Justice of India.

He previously served as the first Advocate-General for Punjab, before becoming the first judge of the Supreme Court of India, to be directly appointed from the Bar. Additionally, he is the first of only two judges to be CJI, directly from the Bar.

== Biography ==
Sikri was born in Lahore on 26 April 1908. He moved to London to study medicine, but switched to law, studying at Trinity College, Cambridge. Before returning to Lahore in 1930, he served as a barrister-at-law at Lincoln's Inn, in London.

He began his legal practise in the chambers of Jagannath Agarwal, who was a leading advocate in the Lahore High Court and practiced criminal and civil law. Following independence, he was appointed the Assistant Advocate General of Punjab in 1949 and soon as the advocate general in 1951. Held the same position almost entirely until his elevation as a judge of the Supreme Court of India in 1964.

As an advocate, he appeared and practised in various courts, ranging from the Lahore High Court and other courts in Punjab to the Federal Court of India and eventually the Supreme Court of India.

== Notable judgements ==
I.C. Golaknath and Ors. v. State of Punjab and Anrs. had him a part of the thin majority of 6:5, in which the court reversed its earlier decision which had upheld Parliament's power to amend all parts of the Constitution, including Part III related to Fundamental Rights. The judgement left Parliament with no power to curtail Fundamental Rights.

Legal offices
Preceded by Jayantilal Chhotalal Shah	Chief Justice of India; January 22, 1971– April 25, 1973	Succeeded by Ajit Nath Ray
