= Fundamental rights in India =

Inalienable rights guaranteed to People in India by its Constitution

The Fundamental Rights in India enshrined in part III (Article 12–35) of the Constitution of India guarantee civil liberties such that all Indians can lead their lives in peace and harmony as citizens of India. These rights are known as "fundamental" as they are the most essential for all-round development i.e., material, intellectual, moral and spiritual and protected by fundamental law of the land i.e. constitution. If the rights provided by Constitution especially the fundamental rights are violated, the Supreme Court and the High Courts can issue writs under Articles 32 and 226 of the Constitution, respectively, directing the State Machinery for enforcement of the fundamental rights.

These include individual rights common to most liberal democracies, such as equality before law, freedom of speech and expression, freedom of association and peaceful assembly, freedom to practice religion and the right to constitutional remedies for the protection of civil rights by means of writs such as habeas corpus. Violations of these rights can also result in punishments as prescribed in the Bharatiya Nyaya Sanhita, subject to discretion of the judiciary. The Fundamental Rights are defined as basic human freedoms where every Indian citizen has the right to enjoy for a proper and harmonious development of personality and life. These rights apply universally to all citizens of India, irrespective of their race, place of birth, religion, caste, sexual orientation or gender. They are enforceable by the courts, subject to certain restrictions. The Rights have their origins in many sources, including England's Bill of Rights, the United States Bill of Rights and France's Declaration of the Rights of Man.

The six fundamental rights are:

1. Right to equality (Article 14–18)
2. Right to freedom (Article 19–22)
3. Right against exploitation (Article 23–24)
4. Right to freedom of religion (Article 25–28)
5. Cultural and educational rights (Article 29–30)
6. Right to constitutional remedies (Article 32–35)

Rights literally mean those freedoms which are essential for personal good as well as the good of the community. The rights guaranteed under the Constitution of India are fundamental as they have been incorporated into the Fundamental Law of the Land and are enforceable in a court of law. However, this does not mean that they are absolute or immune from Constitutional amendment.

Fundamental rights for Indians have also been aimed at overturning the inequalities of pre-independence social practices. Specifically, they have also been used to abolish untouchability and hence prohibit discrimination on the grounds of religion, race, caste, sex (including sexual orientation), or place of birth. They also forbid trafficking of human beings and forced labour. They also protect cultural and educational rights of ethnic and religious minorities by allowing them to preserve their languages and also establish and administer their own education institutions. When the Constitution of India came into force it basically gave seven fundamental rights to its citizens. However, Right to Property was removed as a Fundamental Right through 44th Constitutional Amendment in 1978. In 2009, Right to Education Act was added. Every child between the age of 6 to 14 years is entitled to free education.

In the case of Kesavananda Bharati v. State of Kerala (1973), it was held by the Supreme Court that Fundamental Rights can be amended by the Parliament, however, such amendment should not contravene the basic structure of the Constitution.

== Origins ==
The first demand for fundamental rights came in the form of the "Constitution of India Bill, in 1895. Also popularly known as the Swaraj Bill 1895, it was written during the emergence of Indian nationalism and increasingly vocal demands by Indians for self-government. It talked about freedom of speech, right to privacy, right to franchise, etc.

In the following period, attempts were made from quarters asking the British government to grant rights for Indians. These demands were made in resolution by the INC between 1917 and 1919 in several reports and bills.

In 1919, the Rowlatt Act gave extensive powers to the British government and allowed indefinite arrest and detention of individuals, warrantless searches and seizures, restrictions on public gatherings, and intensive censorship of media and publications. The public opposition to this act eventually led to mass campaigns of non-violent civil disobedience throughout the country demanding guaranteed civil freedoms, and limitations on government power. Indians, who were seeking independence and their own government, were particularly influenced by the independence of Ireland and the development of the Irish constitution. Also, the directive principles of state policy in Irish constitution were looked upon by the people of India as an inspiration for independent India's government to comprehensively tackle complex social and economic challenges across a vast, diverse nation and population.

In 1928, the Nehru Commission composing of representatives of Indian political parties proposed constitutional reforms for India that apart from calling for dominion status for India and elections under universal suffrage, would guarantee rights deemed fundamental, representation for religious and ethnic minorities, and limit the powers of the government. In 1931, the Indian National Congress (the largest Indian political party of the time) adopted resolutions committing itself to the defence of fundamental civil rights, as well as socio-economic rights such as the minimum wage and the abolition of untouchability and serfdom. Committing themselves to socialism in 1936, the Congress leaders took examples from the Constitution of the Soviet Union, which inspired the fundamental duties of citizens as a means of collective patriotic responsibility for national interests and challenges.

When India obtained independence on 15 August 1947, the task of developing a constitution for the nation was undertaken by the Constituent Assembly of India, composed of elected representatives under the presidency of Rajendra Prasad. While members of Congress constituted a large majority, Congress leaders appointed persons from diverse political backgrounds to positions of responsibility for developing the constitution and national laws. Notably, B. R. Ambedkar became the chairperson of the Drafting Committee, while Jawaharlal Nehru and Sardar Vallabhbhai Patel became chairpersons of committees and sub-committees responsible for different subjects. A notable development during that period having significant effect on the Indian constitution took place on 10 December 1948 when the United Nations General Assembly adopted the Universal Declaration of Human Rights and called upon all member states to adopt these rights in their respective constitutions.

The fundamental rights were included in the First Draft Constitution (February 1948), the Second Draft Constitution (17 October 1948) and final Third Draft Constitution (26 November 1949), prepared by the Drafting Committee.

== Significance and characteristics ==
The fundamental rights were included in the constitution because they were considered essential for the development of the personality of every individual and to preserve human dignity. The writers of the constitution regarded [democracy] of no avail if civil liberties, like freedom of speech and religion, were not recognised and protected by the State. According to them, "democracy" is, in essence, a government by opinion and therefore, the means of formulating public opinion should be secured to the people of a democratic nation. For this purpose, the constitution guaranteed to all the citizens of India the freedom of speech and expression and various other freedoms in the form of the fundamental rights.

All people, irrespective of race, religion, caste or gender, have been given the right to petition the Supreme Court or the High Courts for the enforcement of their fundamental rights. It is not necessary that the aggrieved party has to be the one to do so. Poverty-stricken people may not have the means to do so and therefore, in the public interest, anyone can commence litigation in the court on their behalf. This is known as "public interest litigation". In some cases, High Court judges have acted suo moto on their own on the basis of newspaper reports.

These fundamental rights help not only in protection but also the prevention of gross violations of human rights. They emphasise on the fundamental unity of India by guaranteeing to all citizens the access and use of the same facilities, irrespective of background. Some fundamental rights apply for persons of any nationality whereas others are available only to the citizens of India. The right to life and personal liberty is available to all people and so is the right to freedom of religion. On the other hand, freedoms of speech and expression, and freedom to reside and settle in any part of the country are reserved for citizens alone, including non-resident Indian citizens. The right to equality in matters of public employment cannot be conferred to overseas citizens of India.

Fundamental rights primarily protect individuals from any arbitrary state actions, but some rights are enforceable against individuals. For instance, the Constitution abolishes untouchability and also prohibits begar. These provisions act as a check both on state action as well as the action of private individuals. However, these rights are not absolute or uncontrolled and are subject to reasonable restrictions as necessary for the protection of general welfare. They can also be selectively curtailed. The Supreme Court has ruled that all provisions of the Constitution, including fundamental rights, can be amended, but that Parliament cannot alter the basic structure of the constitution. Since the fundamental rights can be altered only by a constitutional amendment, their inclusion is a check not only on the executive branch but also on the Parliament and state legislatures.

A state of national emergency has an adverse effect on these rights. Under such a state, the rights conferred by Article 19 (freedoms of speech, assembly and movement, etc.) remain suspended. Hence, in such a situation, the legislature may make laws that go against the rights given in Article 19. The President may by order suspend the right to move the court for the enforcement of other rights as well.

== Right To Equality ==
The Right to Equality is one of the chief guarantees of the Constitution. It is embodied in Articles 14–18, which collectively encompass the general principles of equality before law and non-discrimination and Articles 17–18 which collectively encompass further the philosophy of social equality.

=== Article 14 ===
Article 14 guarantees equality before law as well as equal protection of the law to all people within the territory of India. This includes the equal subjection of all persons to the authority of law, as well as equal treatment of persons in similar circumstances. The latter permits the State to classify persons for legitimate purposes, provided there is a reasonable basis for the same, meaning that the classification is required to be non-arbitrary, based on a method of intelligible differentiation among those sought to be classified, as well as have a rational relation to the object sought to be achieved by the classification.

=== Article 15 ===
Article 15 prohibits discrimination on the grounds of religion, race, caste, sex (including sexual orientation) or place of birth. This right can be enforced against the State as well as private individuals, with regard to free access to places of public entertainment or places of public resort maintained partly or wholly out of State funds. However, the State is not precluded from making special provisions for women and children or any socially and educationally backward classes of citizens, including the Scheduled Castes and Scheduled Tribes. This exception has been provided since the classes of people mentioned are considered deprived and in need of special protection.

=== Article 16 ===
Article 16 guarantees equality of opportunity in matters of public employment and prevents the State from discriminating against anyone in matters of employment on the grounds only of religion, race, caste, sex (including sexual orientation), descent, place of birth, place of residence or income. It creates exceptions for the implementation of measures of affirmative action for the benefit of any backward class of citizens to ensure adequate representation in public service, as well as reservation of an office of any religious institution for a person professing that particular religion.

=== Article 17 ===
Article 17 abolishes the practice of untouchability in any form, making it an offense punishable by law. The Protection of Civil Rights Act, 1955 was enacted by Parliament to further this objective.

=== Article 18 ===
Article 18 prohibits the State from conferring any titles other than military or academic distinctions, and the citizens of India cannot accept titles from a foreign state. Thus, Indian aristocratic titles and title of nobility conferred by the British have been abolished. However, military and academic distinctions can be conferred on the citizens of India. The awards of Bharat Ratna and Padma Vibhushan can be used by the recipient as a title and do not, accordingly, come within the constitutional prohibition". The Supreme Court, on 15 December 1995, upheld the validity of such awards.

== Right To Freedom ==
The Right to Freedom is covered in Article 19 to 22, with the view of guaranteeing individual rights that were considered vital by the framers of the Constitution, and these Articles also include certain restrictions that may be imposed by the State on individual liberty under specified conditions. Article 19 guarantees six freedoms in the nature of civil rights, which are available only to citizens of India. These include the freedom of speech and expression, freedom of assembly without arms, freedom of association, freedom of movement throughout the territory of our country, freedom to reside and settle in any part of the country of India and the freedom to practice any profession. All these freedoms are subject to reasonable restrictions that may be imposed on them by the State, listed under Article 19 itself. The grounds for imposing these restrictions vary according to the freedom sought to be restricted and include national security, public order, decency and morality, contempt of court, incitement to offences and defamation. The State is also empowered, in the interests of the general public to nationalize any trade, industry or service to the exclusion of the citizens.

The freedoms guaranteed by Article 19 are further sought to be protected by Articles 20–22. The scope of these articles, particularly with respect to the doctrine of due process, was heavily debated by the Constituent Assembly. It was argued, especially by Benegal Narsing Rau, that the incorporation of such a clause would hamper social legislation and cause procedural difficulties in maintaining order, and therefore it ought to be excluded from the Constitution altogether. The Constituent Assembly in 1948 eventually omitted the phrase "due process" in favor of "procedure established by law". As a result, Article 21, which prevents the encroachment of life or personal liberty by the State except in accordance with the procedure established by law, was, until 1978, construed narrowly as being restricted to executive action. However, in 1978, the Supreme Court in the case of Maneka Gandhi v. Union of India extended the protection of Article 21 to legislative action, holding that any law laying down a procedure must be just, fair and reasonable, and effectively reading due process into Article 21. In the same case, the Supreme Court also ruled that "life" under Article 21 meant more than a mere "animal existence"; it would include the right to live with human dignity and all other aspects which made life "meaningful, complete and worth living". Subsequent judicial interpretation has broadened the scope of Article 21 to include within it a number of rights including those to livelihood, good health, clean environment, water, speedy trial and humanitarian treatment while imprisoned. The right to education at elementary level has been made one of the Fundamental Rights under Article 21A by the 86th Constitutional amendment of 2002. Article 20 provides protection from conviction for offences in certain respects, including the rights against ex post facto laws, double jeopardy and freedom from self-incrimination. Article 22 provides specific rights to arrested and detained persons, in particular the rights to be informed of the grounds of arrest, consult a lawyer of one's own choice, be produced before a magistrate within 24 hours of the arrest, and the freedom not to be detained beyond that period without an order of the magistrate. The Constitution also authorizes the State to make laws providing for preventive detention, subject to certain other safeguards present in Article 22. The provisions pertaining to preventive detention were discussed with scepticism and misgivings by the Constituent Assembly, and were reluctantly approved after a few amendments in 1949. In September 2026, the Supreme Court held in Jaskaran Jeet Singh Deol v. State of Punjab that once an arrest is found illegal for breach of the right under Article 22(1) to be informed of the grounds of arrest, the police cannot re-arrest the person on their own authority. A bench of Justices Ujjal Bhuyan and Atul Chandurkar ruled that re-arrest requires a written application, endorsed by the arresting officer's immediate superior, seeking a magistrate's prior permission; the magistrate must be satisfied that the original failure had a bona fide reason before permitting re-arrest. Article 22 provides that when a person is detained under any law of preventive detention, the State can detain such person without trial for only three months, and any detention for a longer period must be authorised by an advisory board. The person being detained also has the right to be informed about the grounds of detention, and be permitted to make a representation against it, at the earliest opportunity.

=== Right to information (RTI) ===
Right to information has been given the status of a fundamental right under Article 19(1) of the Constitution in 2005. Article 19 (1) provides every person with freedom of speech and expression, as well as the right to know how the government works, what roles it plays, and what its functions are, among other things.

== Right against exploitation ==
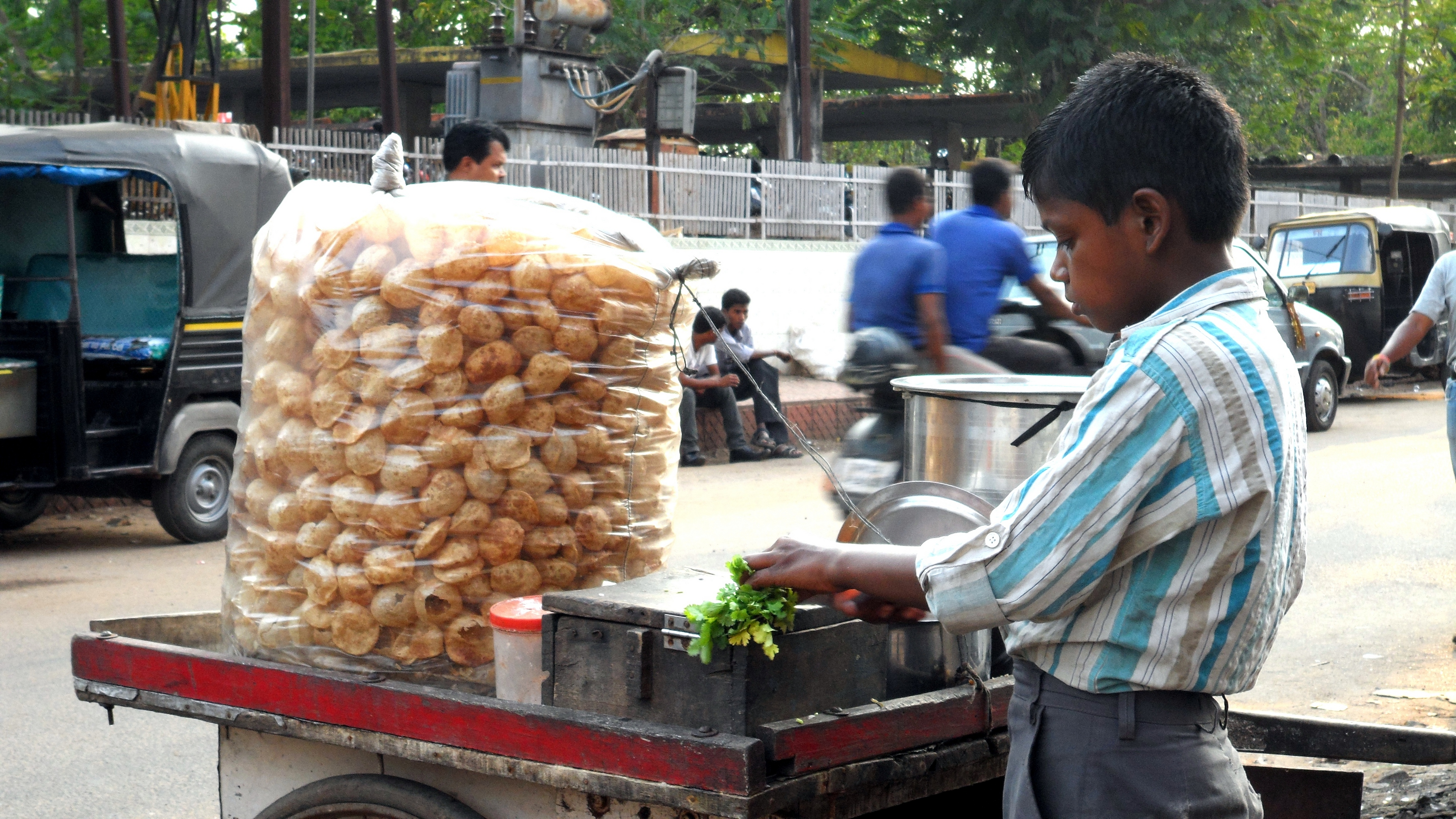
A boy working at a street stall in 2013

The Right against Exploitation contained in Articles 23–24, lays down certain provisions to prevent exploitation of the weaker sections of the society by individuals or the State. Article 23 prohibits human trafficking, making it an offence punishable by law, and also prohibits forced labour or any act of compelling a person to work without wages where he/she was legally entitled not to work or to receive remuneration for it. However, it permits the State to impose compulsory service for public purposes, including conscription and community service. The Bonded Labour System (Abolition) Act, 1976, has been enacted by Parliament to give effect to this Article. Article 24 prohibits the employment of children below the age of 14 years in factories, mines and other hazardous jobs. Parliament has enacted the Child Labour (Prohibition and Regulation) Act, 1986, providing regulations for the abolition of, and penalties for employing, child labour, as well as provisions for rehabilitation of former child labourers.

== Right to freedom of religion ==
The Right to Freedom of Religion, covered in Articles 25–28, provides religious freedom to all citizens and ensures a secular state in India. According to the Constitution, there is no official State religion, and the State is required to treat all religions equally, impartially and neutrally.

- Article 25 guarantees all persons the freedom of conscience and the right to preach, practice and propagate any religion of their choice. This right is, however, subject to public order, morality and health, and the power of the State to take measures for social welfare and reform. The right to propagate, however, does not include the right to convert another individual, since it would amount to an infringement of the other's right to freedom of conscience.
- Article 26 guarantees all religious denominations and sects, subject to public order, morality and health, to manage their own affairs in matters of religion, set up institutions of their own for charitable or religious purposes, and own, acquire and manage a property in accordance with law. These provisions do not derogate from the State's power to acquire property belonging to a religious denomination. The State is also empowered to regulate any economic, political or other secular activity associated with religious practice.
- Article 27 guarantees that no one can be compelled to pay taxes for the promotion of any particular religion or religious institution.
- Article 28 prohibits religious instruction in a wholly or partially state-funded educational institution, and educational institutions receiving aid from the State .The State cannot compel any of their members to receive religious instruction or attend religious worship without their (or their guardian's) consent.

== Right to Life and Personal Liberty ==
The Constitution guarantees the right to life and personal liberty, which in turn cites specific provisions in which these rights are applied and enforced:

- Protection with respect to a conviction for offences is guaranteed under the right to life and personal liberty. According to Article 20, no one can be awarded punishment which is more than what the law of the land prescribes at the time of commission of the crime. This legal axiom is based on the principle that no criminal law can be made retrospective, that is, for an act to become an offence, the essential condition is that it should have been an offence legally at the time of committing it. Moreover, no person accused of any offence shall be compelled to be a witness against himself. Compulsion in this article refers to what in law is called duress (injury, beating or unlawful imprisonment to make a person do something that he may not want to do). This article is known as a safeguard against self-incrimination. The other principle enshrined in this article is known as the principle of double jeopardy, that is, no person can be convicted twice for the same offence, which has been derived from Anglo-Saxon law. This principle was first established in Magna Carta.
- Protection of life and personal liberty is also stated under the right to life and personal liberty. Article 21 declares that no citizen can be denied his life and liberty except by due process of law. This means that a person's life and personal liberty can be disputed only if that person has committed a crime. However, the right to life does not include the right to die and hence, suicide or any attempt thereof, is deemed an offence (attempted suicide being interpreted as a crime has seen many debates. The Supreme Court of India gave a landmark ruling in 1994. The court repealed section 309 of the Indian penal code, under which people attempting suicide could face prosecution and prison terms of up to one year). In 1996, another Supreme Court ruling nullified the earlier one. But with the passage of the Mental Healthcare Bill 2017, attempted suicide has been decriminalised. "Personal liberty" includes all the freedoms which are not included in Article 19 (that is, the six freedoms). The right to travel abroad is also covered under "personal liberty" in Article 21.
- In 2002, through the 86th Amendment Act, Article 21A was incorporated. It made the right to primary education part of the right to freedom, stating that the state would provide free and compulsory education to children from six to fourteen years of age. Six years after an amendment was made in the Indian Constitution, the Union Cabinet cleared the Right to Education Bill in 2008.
- Rights of a person arrested under ordinary circumstances is laid down in the right to life and personal liberty. No one can be arrested without being told the grounds for his arrest. If arrested, the person has the right to defend himself through a lawyer of his choice. Also, an arrested citizen has to be brought before the nearest magistrate within 24 hours. The rights of a person arrested under ordinary circumstances are not available to an enemy alien. They are also not available to persons under any law providing for preventive detention. Under preventive detention, the government can imprison a person for a maximum of three months. It means that if the government feels that a person being at liberty can be a threat to the law and order or to the unity and integrity of the nation, it can detain or arrest that person to prevent him/her from doing this possible harm. After three months, such a case is to be brought before an advisory board for review, unless specific legislation(s) by Parliament regarding preventive detention do(es) not necessitate scrutiny by such an advisory board.

== Cultural and educational rights ==
The Cultural and Educational rights, given in Articles 29 and 30, are measures to protect the rights of cultural, linguistic, and religious minorities, by enabling them to conserve their heritage and protecting them against discrimination.

- Article 29 grants any section of citizens having a distinct language, script, or culture of its own, the right to conserve and develop the same, and thus safeguards the rights of minorities by preventing the State from imposing any external culture on them. It also prohibits discrimination against any citizen for admission into any educational institutions maintained or aided by the State, on the grounds only of religion, race, caste, language or any of them. However, this is subject to reservation of a reasonable number of seats by the State for socially and educationally backward classes, as well as reservation of up to, 50 percent of seats in any educational institution run by a minority community for citizens belonging to that community.
- Article 30 confers upon all religious and linguistic minorities the right to set up and administer educational institutions of their choice to preserve and develop their own culture, and prohibits the State, while granting aid, from discriminating against any institution on the basis of the fact that it is administered by a religious or cultural minority. The term "minority", while not defined in the Constitution, has been interpreted by the Supreme Court to mean any community which numerically forms less than 50% of the population of the state in which it seeks to avail the right under Article 30. To claim the right, it is essential that the educational institution must have been established as well as administered by a religious or linguistic minority. Further, the right under Article 30 can be availed of even if the educational institution established does not confine itself to the teaching of the religion or language of the minority concerned, or a majority of students in that institution do not belong to such a minority. This right is subject to the power of the State to impose reasonable regulations regarding educational standards, conditions of service of employees, fee structure, and the use of any aid granted by it.

== Right to Constitutional Remedies ==
Article 32 provides a guaranteed remedy, in the form of a Fundamental Right itself, for enforcement of all the other Fundamental Rights, and the Supreme Court is designated as the protector of these rights by the Constitution. The Supreme Court has been empowered to issue writs, namely habeas corpus, mandamus, prohibition, certiorari and quo warranto, for the enforcement of the Fundamental Rights, while the High Courts have been empowered under Article 226 – which is not a Fundamental Right in itself – to issue these prerogative writs even in cases not involving the violation of Fundamental Rights. The Supreme Court has the jurisdiction to enforce the Fundamental Rights even against private bodies, and in case of any violation, award compensation as well to the affected individual. Exercise of jurisdiction by the Supreme Court can also be suo motu or on the basis of a public interest litigation. This right cannot be suspended, except under the provisions of Article 352, when a state of emergency is declared.

Article 33 of the Indian constitution grants the Parliament the authority to enact legislation aimed at limiting the extension of fundamental rights to particular groups, which may encompass individuals within the Indian Army and intelligence agencies.

Article 34 of the Constitution grants authority to the Parliament to provide indemnification for government servants or individuals who may have taken actions in relation to the maintenance or restoration of order within regions where martial law had been enforced. This constitutional provision essentially empowers the Parliament to absolve these individuals from any legal liability or consequences arising from their actions undertaken in the context of martial law implementation. In essence, it allows for the legal protection and exoneration of those involved in maintaining or restoring order during periods when martial law was in effect.

Article 35 of the Indian Constitution is a provision that gives the Parliament the exclusive power to make laws on certain matters related to the fundamental rights, such as the reservation of public employment, the application of fundamental rights to the armed forces, the restriction of fundamental rights during martial law, and the punishment for violating the fundamental rights. It also states that any law that was in force before the Constitution came into effect on these matters will continue to be valid until amended or repealed by the Parliament. Article 35 also clarifies that the term "law in force" has the same meaning as in Article 372, which deals with the continuance of existing laws and their adaptation. Article 35 was added to the Constitution by the Constituent Assembly to ensure that there is uniformity and consistency in the laws relating to the fundamental rights across the country.

Article 35 should not be confused with Article 35A, which was a separate article that empowered the Jammu and Kashmir (union territory) state's legislature to define "permanent residents" of the state and provide special rights and privileges to them. Article 35A was added to the Constitution through a presidential order in 1954, without any amendment by the Parliament. It was abrogated by another presidential order in 2019, along with Article 370, which granted special status to Jammu and Kashmir.

Dr B. R. Ambedkar wanted a specific guarantee of fundamental rights expressly incorporated in the constitution so that it could be easily enforced. He drafted this Article 32. B. R. Ambedkar had said,

"If I was asked to name any particular article in this Constitution as the most important – an article without which this Constitution would be a nullity – I could not refer to any other article except this one (Article 32). It is the very soul of the Constitution and the very heart of it."

During the Constituent Assembly debates in December 1948, Dr. Babasaheb Ambedkar had said that the rights invested with the Supreme Court through this Article could not be taken away unless the Constitution itself is amended and hence it was 'one of the greatest safeguards that can be provided for the safety and security of the individual'.

The right to constitutional remedies is present for enforcement of fundamental rights.

== Right to privacy ==
The right to privacy is protected as an intrinsic part of the right to life and personal liberty under Article 21 and as a part of the freedoms guaranteed by Part III of the Constitution. It protects the inner sphere of the individual from interference from both State and non-State actors and allows individuals to make autonomous life choices. On 24 August 2017, the Supreme Court of India in its Right to Privacy verdict ruled that:

"Right to Privacy is an integral part of Right to Life and Personal Liberty guaranteed in Article 21 of the Constitution,"

== Critical analysis ==
The fundamental rights have been revised for many reasons. Political and other groups have demanded that the right to work, the right to economic assistance in case of unemployment, old age, and similar rights be enshrined as constitutional guarantees to address issues of poverty and economic insecurity, though these provisions have been enshrined in the directive principles of state policy. The right to freedom and personal liberty has a number of limiting clauses, and thus has been criticised for failing to check the sanctioning of powers often deemed "excessive". There is also the provision of preventive detention and suspension of fundamental rights in times of emergency. The provisions of acts like the Maintenance of Internal Security Act (MISA), Armed Forces (Special Powers) Act (AFSPA) and the National Security Act (NSA) are a means of countering these fundamental rights, because they sanction excessive powers with the aim of fighting internal and cross-border terrorism and political violence, without safeguards for civil rights. The phrases "security of State", "public order" and "morality" are of wide implication. The meaning of phrases like "reasonable restrictions" and "the interest of public order" have not been explicitly stated in the Constitution, and this ambiguity leads to unnecessary litigation. The freedom to assemble peaceably and without arms is exercised, but in some cases, these meetings are broken up by the police through the use of non-fatal methods.

Freedom of press has not been included in the right to freedom, which is necessary for formulating public opinion and to make freedom of expression more legitimate. Employment of child labour in hazardous job environments has been reduced, but their employment even in non-hazardous jobs, including their prevalent employment as domestic help violates the spirit and ideals of the Constitution. More than 16.5 million children are employed and working in India. India was ranked 88 out of 159 in 2005, according to the degree to which corruption is perceived to exist among public officials and politicians worldwide. In 2014, India had improved marginally to a rank of 85. The right to equality in matters regarding public employment is not conferred upon overseas citizens of India, according to the Citizenship (Amendment) Bill, 2003.

As per Article 19 of Part III of the Constitution, the fundamental rights of people such as freedom of speech and expression, gathering peaceably without arms and forming associations or unions shall not effect the interests of the sovereignty unity and integrity of India. The words sovereignty and integrity are the qualities to be cultivated/emulated by Indian people as urged by the Constitution but not used related to the territory of India. Article 1 of Part 1 of the Indian constitution, defines India (Bharat) as a Union of states. In a nutshell, India "is its people, not its land", as enshrined in the Constitution.

Although speedy trial is a fundamental right, the cases involving violations of fundamental rights take an inordinate amount of time for resolution by the Supreme Court which is against the legal maxim 'justice delayed is justice denied'.

== Amendments ==
Changes to the fundamental rights require a constitutional amendment, which has to be passed by a special majority of both houses of Parliament. This means that an amendment requires the approval of two-thirds of the members present and voting. However, the number of members voting in support of the amendment shall not be less than the absolute majority of the total members of a house – whether the Lok Sabha or Rajya Sabha.

== Fundamental rights and its issues ==
=== Basic structure doctrine ===
While deciding the Golaknath case in February 1967, the Supreme Court ruled that Parliament had no power to curtail the fundamental rights. They were made permanent and sacrosanct, reversing the Supreme Court's earlier decision which had upheld Parliament's power to amend all parts of the Constitution, including Part III related to fundamental rights. Up until the 24th constitutional amendment in 1971, the fundamental rights given to the people were permanent and could not be repealed or diluted by Parliament. The 24th constitutional amendment introduced a new article – Article 13(4) – enabling Parliament to legislate on the subjects of Part III of the constitution using its constituent powers per Article 368 (1). In 1973, a 13 member constitutional bench of the Supreme Court also upheld with majority the validity of the 24th constitutional amendment. However, it ruled that the basic structure of the constitution, which is built on the basic foundation representing the dignity and freedom of the individual, could not be altered, and that it was "of supreme importance" and could not be destroyed by means of amendment(s) to the Constitution. Many constitutional amendments to Part III of the Constitution were made deleting, adding or diluting the fundamental rights before the judgement of Golaknath case (Constitutional amendments 1, 4, 7, and 16) and after the validity of 24th constitutional amendment was upheld by the Supreme Court (Constitutional amendments 25, 42, 44, 50, 77, 81, 85, 86, 93, and 97).

=== Validity of Article 31B ===
Articles 31A and Article 31B are added by the first constitutional amendment in 1951. Article 31B says that any acts and regulations included in the Ninth Schedule of the constitution by the Parliament can override the fundamental rights and such laws cannot be repealed or made void by the judiciary on the grounds of violating fundamental rights. Thus fundamental rights given in Part III are not equally applicable in each state /region and can be made different by making additions/deletions to Ninth Schedule by constitutional amendments. In 2007, the Supreme Court ruled that there could not be any blanket immunity from judicial review for the laws inserted in the Ninth Schedule. Apex court also stated it shall examine laws included in the Ninth Schedule after 1973 for any incompatibility with the basic structure doctrine.

=== Amendment to Article 31C ===
Section 4 of the 42nd Amendment, had changed Article 31C of the Constitution to accord precedence to the Directive Principles (earlier applicable only to clauses b & c of Article 39) over the fundamental rights of individuals. In Minerva Mills v. Union of India case, the Supreme Court ruled that the amendment to Article 31C was not valid and ultra vires.

=== Right to property ===
The Constitution originally provided for the right to property under Articles 19 and 31. Article 19 guaranteed to all citizens the right to acquire, hold and dispose of property. Article 31 provided that "no person shall be deprived of his property save by authority of law." It also provided that compensation would be paid to a person whose property has been taken for public purposes.

The provisions relating to the right to property were changed a number of times. The 44th Amendment of 1978 removed the right to property from the list of fundamental rights. A new provision, Article 300-A, was added to the constitution, which provided that "no person shall be deprived of his property save by authority of law". Thus, if a legislator made a law depriving a person of his property, there would be no obligation on the part of the State to pay anything as compensation. Furthermore, the aggrieved person would also have no right to move the court under Article 32 due to the right to property no longer being a fundamental right, though it would still be a constitutional one. If the government appeared to have acted unfairly, the action could have been challenged in a court of law by aggrieved citizens before the amendment.

The liberalisation of the economy and the government's initiative to set up special economic zones has led to many protests by farmers and have led to calls for the reinstatement of the fundamental right to private property. The Supreme Court dismissed the Public interest litigation (PIL) petition seeking a direction to make ‘right to property' a fundamental right under the Constitution.

=== Right to education ===
The right to education at elementary level has been made one of the fundamental rights in 2002 under the 86th Amendment of 2002. However this right was brought in to implementation after eight years in 2010. On 2 April 2010, India joined a group of few countries in the world, with a historical law making education a fundamental right of every child coming into force.

The Right of Children to Free and Compulsory Education Act is said to be of direct benefit to children who do not go to school. This Act provides for the appointment of teachers with the requisite entry and academic qualifications.

Former Prime Minister Manmohan Singh announced the implementation of the Act. Children, who had either dropped out of schools or never been to any educational institution, would get elementary education as it would be binding on the part of the local and state governments to ensure that all children in the 6–14 age group get schooling. As per the Act, private educational institutions should reserve 25 percent seats for children from the weaker sections of society. The Union and the state governments had agreed to share the financial burden in the ratio of 55:45, while the Finance Commission gave Rs. 250 billion to the states for implementing the Act. The Union government approved an outlay of Rs. 150 billion for 2010–2011.

The school management committee or the local authority would identify the drop-outs or out-of-school children aged above six and admit them in classes appropriate to their age after giving special training.

== See also ==
- Lawmaking procedure in India
- President's rule
- President of India
- Federalism in India
- Part I of the Constitution of India
- List of amendments of the Constitution of India
- List of acts of the Parliament of India
- Secularism
- The Constitution of India
