= States of emergency in India =

Part XVIII of the Constitution of India allows for a constitutional setup that can be proclaimed by the president of India as a state of emergency, when the consultant group perceives and warns against grave threats to the nation from internal and external sources or from financial situations of crisis. Under Article 352 of the Indian constitution, upon the advice of the cabinet of ministers, the President can overrule many provisions of the constitution, which can suspend fundamental rights to the citizens of India and acts governing devolution of powers to the states which form the federation. In the history of independent India, such a state of emergency has been declared thrice.

1. The first instance was between 26 October 1962 to 21 November 1962 during the India-China war, when "the security of India" was declared as being "threatened by external aggression".
2. The second instance was between 3 and 17 December 1971, which was originally proclaimed during the Indo-Pakistan war.
3. The third proclamation between 25 June 1975 to January 1977 was under controversial circumstances of political instability under Indira Gandhi's premiership, when emergency was declared on the basis of "internal disturbances". The proclamation immediately followed a ruling in the Allahabad High Court, that voided the Prime Minister's election from Rae Bareli in the 1971 Indian general election. She was also prohibited from contesting election for next 6 years, challenging her legitimacy to continue in her post. Indira Gandhi, instead recommended to the then president Fakhruddin Ali Ahmed to proclaim a state of emergency to strengthen her hand.

The phrase Emergency period used loosely, when referring to the political history of India, often refers to this third and the most controversial of the three occasions.

In 1978, the Forty-fourth Amendment of the Constitution of India, substituted the words "armed rebellion" for "internal disturbance" in Article 352, making the term more specific and less subject to interpretations. The amendment also protected Articles 20 and 21 from being suspended during an emergency.

The President can declare three types of emergencies — national, state and financial emergency in a state.

== National emergency under Article 352 ==
Originally at the beginning, a National emergency could be declared on the basis of "external aggression or war" and "internal disturbance" in the whole of India or a part of its territory under Article 352. Such an emergency was declared in India in the 1962 Sino- Indian War, 1971 Indo- Pakistani War, and 1975 internal disturbance (declared by Fakhruddin Ali Ahmed ). But after the 44th amendment act 1978, National Emergency can only be declared on grounds of "External aggression or war", also called as External Emergency & on the ground of "armed rebellion", also called as Internal Emergency. The President can declare such an emergency only on the basis of a written request by the Cabinet headed by the Prime Minister. Such a proclamation must be laid before both houses of Parliament and the state of emergency expires after one month unless approved within that time by both houses sitting and voting separately. However, if the Lok Sabha (the lower house) has been dissolved or dissolution takes place in the state of emergency, and the Rajya Sabha approves of the state of emergency, the deadline for the Lok Sabha is extended until thirty days after that house reconstituted. According to Article 352(6), approval by either house requires a special majority: those in favour of the motion must be two-thirds of those present and voting, and amount to a majority of the entire membership of that house. A Parliamentary resolution extends the state of emergency for up to six months, and it can be extended indefinitely by further resolutions in six-monthly increments.

During a national emergency, many Fundamental Rights of Indian citizens can be suspended. The six freedoms under Right to Freedom are automatically suspended. By contrast, the Right to Life and Personal Liberty cannot be suspended according to the original Constitution. In January 1977, during the emergency declared controversially by Indira Gandhi, the government decided to suspend even the Right to Life and Personal Liberty by dispensing with habeas corpus. Justice Hans Raj Khanna defended the Right to Life and asked: "Life is also mentioned in Article 21 and would Government argument extend to it also?". The Attorney General observed: "Even if life was taken away illegally, courts are helpless".

A national emergency modifies the quasi-federal system of government to a unitary one by granting Parliament the power to make laws on the 66 subjects of the State List (which contains subjects on which the state governments can make laws). Also, all state money bills are referred to the Parliament for its approval.

During an emergency, the term of the Lok Sabha can be successively extended by intervals of up to one year, but not beyond six months after the state of emergency has been revoked.

== President's Rule under Article 356 ==
It had been declared for the first time in the State of Punjab in 1951. A state of emergency can be declared in any state of India under article 356 on the recommendation of the governor of the state. Every state in India has been under a state of emergency at some point of time or the other. The state of emergency is commonly known as 'President's Rule' and is usually not referred to as 'State Emergency' for a number of reasons.

If the President is satisfied, based on the report of the Governor of the concerned state or from other sources, that the governance in a state cannot be carried out according to the provisions in the Constitution, the governor may declare an emergency in the state. Such an emergency must be approved by the Parliament within a period of two months.

It is imposed for an initial period of six months and can last for a maximum period of three years with repeated parliamentary approval every six months. The 42nd amendment act of 1976 extended the initial time duration of President Rule from 6 months to 1 year. Subsequently, 44th CAA 1978 restored the 1-year period back to 6 months. Originally, the maximum period of operation of President Rule was 3 years. This 3-year period was divided into 1 year of ordinary period and 2 years of extra ordinary period for which certain conditions were to be fulfilled. However, now unless revoked, its life can be extended by six months each time, but in no case beyond three years. If the emergency has to be extended for more than three years, it can only be done by a Constitution of India constitutional amendment, as has happened in Punjab and Jammu and Kashmir.

During such emergency, the President can take over the entire work of the executive, and the Governor administers the state in the name of the President. The Legislative Assembly can be dissolved or may remain in suspended animation. The Parliament makes laws on the 66 subjects of the state list. All money bills have to be referred to the Parliament for approval. In this occasion ministers of state legislature do not perform actions in state.

== Financial Emergency under Article 360 ==
Article 360 allows the declaration of Financial Emergency, when "the President is satisfied that a situation has arisen whereby the financial stability or credit of India or of any part of the territory thereof is threatened". Article 360 has never been invoked.
