= Sugrivajne (Sugriva pledge) =

Sugrivajne (Sugriva pledge) (kannada:ಸುಗ್ರೀವಾಜ್ಞೆ) is a popular pledge that appeared in Hindu epic Ramayana. Since then, the word "Sugrivajne" has often been popular in Indian politics to pass a Bill or Act that must be passed or obeyed in a timely fashion or otherwise.

Sugrivajne is from the Yuddha Kāṇḍa of the Ramayana the Hindu epic. Lord Rama at this time on a quest to rescue his wife Sita from the demon Ravana the king of the Rakshasas meets Hanuma. Hanuman introduces Lord Rama to his exiled King Sugriva, at Mount Rishyamukah. Vali the king of Kishkindha after defeating his brother Sugriva keeps Sugriva's wife. Sugriva shows Rama the items that Sita had dropped whilst she traveled overhead in the clutches of Ravana. Rama makes a suggestion to kill Vali and reinstate Sugriva as King if Sugriva, in turn, pledges to help Rama with his quest. Sugriva accepts and goes to challenge Vali. An evenly matched combat ensues between the brothers, and Hanuman helps Rama to kill Vali.

Sugriva claims the kingdom, and takes back his wife Rumā, and makes Vali's widow Tara Empress. Sugriva forgets his earlier promise to help Rama but Hanuman and Tara reminds him the pledge made to Rama. Sugriva takes his army to free Sita from Ravana. In the battle, Sugriva challenges and fights with the Rakshasa Kumbhakarna, a brother of Ravana, and no doubt Kumbakarna would have killed Surgriva but the timely intervention of Rama's brother Lakshmana saves Sugriva.

Thus Sugriva fulfills his pledge.

== See also ==
- Chopra, Deepak, The Seven Spiritual laws of Success: New Delhi, 2000.
- Sugriva wiki article
