= Article 48 =

Article 48 may refer to:

- Article 48 of the Constitution of India
- Article 48 of the Weimar Constitution
