= Forty-third Amendment of the Constitution of India =

The Constitution (Forty-third Amendment) Act, 1977

Parliament of India
- Long title: An Act further to amend the Constitution of India.
- Territorial extent: India
- Passed by: Lok Sabha
- Passed: 20 December 1977
- Passed by: Rajya Sabha
- Passed: 23 December 1977
- Assented to: 13 April 1978
- Effective: 13 April 1978

Legislative history

Initiating chamber: Lok Sabha
- Bill title: The Constitution (Forty-fourth Amendment) Bill, 1977
- Introduced by: Shanti Bhushan, Minister of Law, Justice and Company Affairs
- Introduced: 16 December 1977

Amends
- Constitution of India
- Status: Spent

The Forty-third Amendment of the Constitution of India, officially known as the Constitution (Forty-third Amendment) Act, 1977, repealed six articles that had been inserted into the Constitution by the 42nd Amendment which had been enacted by the Indira Gandhi-led Indian National Congress during the Emergency. The 43rd Amendment was enacted by the newly elected Janata Party which had won the 1977 general elections campaigning on a promise to "restore the Constitution to the condition it was in before the Emergency".

== Proposal and enactment ==
The bill of Constitution (Forty-third Amendment) Act, 1977 was introduced in the Lok Sabha on 16 December 1977 as the Constitution (Forty-fourth Amendment) Bill, 1977. It was introduced by Shanti Bhushan, Minister of Law, Justice and Company Affairs. The bill sought to amend Articles 145, 228 and 366, and omit Articles 31D, 32A, 131A, 144A, 226A and 228A of the Constitution.

The bill was debated by the Lok Sabha on 19 and 20 December, and was passed on 20 December, after adopting a formal amendment to replace the word "Forty-fourth" with "Forty-third" in Clause 1 of the Bill. Subsequently, Clauses 7 to 10 of the Bill were renumbered as 8 to 11 respectively. It was then passed by the Rajya Sabha on 23 December 1977. The bill, after ratification by the states, received assent from President Neelam Sanjiva Reddy on 13 April 1978. It was notified in The Gazette of India and came into force on the same date.

=== Ratification ===
The Act was passed in accordance with the provisions of Article 368 of the Constitution, and was ratified by more than half of the State Legislatures, as required under Clause (2) of the said article. State Legislatures that ratified the amendment are listed below:

1. Andhra Pradesh
2. Assam
3. Bihar
4. Gujarat
5. Haryana
6. Himachal Pradesh
7. Madhya Pradesh
8. Maharashtra
9. Manipur
10. Meghalaya
11. Nagaland
12. Orissa
13. Punjab
14. Rajasthan
15. Sikkim
16. Tamil Nadu
17. Tripura
18. West Bengal

Did not ratify:

1. Karnataka
2. Jammu and Kashmir
3. Kerala
4. Uttar Pradesh

== Constitutional changes ==
The 43rd Amendment repealed six articles – 31D, 32A, 131A, 144A, 226A and 228A – that had been inserted into the Constitution by the 42nd Amendment. Articles 145, 228 and 366 were amended to facilitate the omission of these six articles.

Article 31D had enabled Parliament to legislate on matters concerning "anti-national activities" and "anti-national associations". Article 32A prohibited the Supreme Court from considering the constitutional validity of State laws in writ proceedings for the enforcement of Fundamental Rights. Article 226A placed a similar prohibition on High Courts from considering the constitutional validity of Central laws. Article 131A barred High Courts making judgements on the constitutional validity of Central legislation, giving exclusive jurisdiction for such laws to the Supreme Court.

Article 144A required that the Supreme Court could only declare a Central or State law as unconstitutional if the decision was made by a bench with at least 7 judges, and backed by a special majority of two-thirds of the bench. Article 228A required that a High Court could only declare a State law as unconstitutional if the decision was made by a bench with at least 5 judges, and backed by a special majority of two-thirds of the bench.
