= Twenty-fourth Amendment of the Constitution of India =

Constitutional amendment

The Constitution of India (Twenty-fourth Amendment) Act, 1971

Parliament of India
- Long title: An Act further to amend the Constitution of India.
- Citation: 24th Amendment
- Territorial extent: India
- Passed by: Lok Sabha
- Passed: 4 August 1971
- Passed by: Rajya Sabha
- Passed: 11 August 1971
- Assented to: 5 November 1971
- Commenced: 5 November 1971

Legislative history

Initiating chamber: Lok Sabha
- Bill title: Constitution (Twenty-fourth Amendment) Bill, 1971
- Introduced by: H.R. Gokhale
- Introduced: 28 July 1971

Summary
- Enables Parliament to dilute Fundamental Rights through Amendments of the Constitution, and empowers it to amend any provision of the Constitution. Also makes it obligatory for the President to give his assent, when a Constitution Amendment Bill is presented to him.
- Previous Amendment: 23rd in 1969
- Next Amendment: 25th in 1971
- Status: In force

The Twenty-fourth Amendment of the Constitution of India, officially known as The Constitution (Twenty-fourth Amendment) Act, 1971, enables Parliament to dilute Fundamental Rights through Amendments of the Constitution. It also amended article 368 to provide expressly that Parliament has power to amend any provision of the Constitution. The amendment further made it obligatory for the President to give his assent, when a Constitution Amendment Bill was presented to him.

The 24th Amendment was enacted, by the Congress government headed by Indira Gandhi, to abrogate the Supreme Court ruling in Golaknath v. State of Punjab. The judgement reversed the Supreme Court's earlier decision which had upheld Parliament's power to amend all parts of the Constitution, including Part III related to Fundamental Rights. The judgement left Parliament with no power to curtail Fundamental Rights. To abrogate the ruling, the government intended to amend article 368 to provide expressly that Parliament has power to amend any provision of the Constitution, thereby bringing Fundamental Rights within the scope of its amending procedure, and preventing review of those changes by the courts.

The 24th Amendment came into force on 5 November 1971. The Indian press criticised the 24th Amendment as being too sweeping in its ambit, and of dubious legality. The Amendment was also opposed by jurists, and all the surviving members of the Constituent Assembly at the time. The Supreme Court upheld the validity of the 24th Amendment in Kesavananda Bharati v. State of Kerala in 1973.

== Text ==
BE it enacted by Parliament and in the Twenty-second Year of the Republic of India as follows:—

1. Short title This Act may be called the Constitution (Twenty-fourth Amendment) Act, 1971.

2. Amendment of article 13 In article 13 of the Constitution, after clause (3), the following clause shall be inserted, namely:—
"(4) Nothing in this article shall apply to any amendment of this Constitution made under article 368."

3. Amendment of article 368 Article 368 of the Constitution shall be re-numbered as clause (2) thereof, and—

(a) for the marginal heading to that article, the following marginal heading shall be substituted, namely:—

"Power of Parliament to amend the Constitution and procedure therefor.";

(b) before clause (2) as so re-numbered, the following clause shall be inserted, namely:—

"(1) Notwithstanding anything in this Constitution, Parliament may in exercise of its constituent power amend by way of addition, variation or repeal any provision of this Constitution in accordance with the procedure laid down in this article.";

(c) in clause (2) as so re-numbered, for the words "it shall be presented to the President for his assent and upon such assent being given to the Bill", the words "it shall be presented to the President who shall give his assent to the Bill and thereupon" shall be substituted;
(d) After clause (2) as so re-numbered, the following clause shall be inserted namely:—

"(3) Nothing in article 13 shall apply to any amendment made under this article".

The full text of article 13, after the 24th Amendment, is given below:

13. Laws inconsistent with or in derogation of the fundamental rights.

(1) All laws in force in the territory of India immediately before the commencement of this Constitution, in so far as they are inconsistent with the provisions of this Part, shall, to the extent of such inconsistency, be void.
(2) The State shall not make any law which takes away or abridges the rights conferred by this Part and any law made in contravention of this clause shall, to the extent of the contravention, be void.
(3) In this article, unless the context otherwise requires,—

(a) "law" includes any Ordinance, order, bye-law, rule, regulation, notification, custom or usage having in the territory of India the force of law;
(b) "laws in force" includes laws passed or made by a Legislature or other competent authority in the territory of India before the commencement of this Constitution and not previously repealed, notwithstanding that any such law or any part thereof may not be then in operation either at all or in particular areas.

(4) Nothing in this article shall apply to any amendment of this Constitution made under article 368.

The full text of article 368, after the 24th Amendment, is given below:

368. ~~Procedure for amendment of the Constitution.~~ Power of Parliament to amend the Constitution and procedure therefor.

(1) Notwithstanding anything in this Constitution, Parliament may in exercise of its constituent power amend by way of addition, variation or repeal any provision of this Constitution in accordance with the procedure laid down in this article.
(2) An amendment of this Constitution may be initiated only by the introduction of a Bill for the purpose in either House of Parliament, and when the Bill is passed in each House by a majority of the total membership of that House and by a majority of not less than two-thirds of the members of that House present and voting, ~~it shall be presented to the President for his assent and upon such assent being given to the Bill~~ it shall be presented to the President who shall give his assent to the Bill and thereupon, the Constitution shall stand amended in accordance with the terms of the Bill:

Provided that if such amendment seeks to make any change in—

(a) article 54, article 55, article 73, article 162 or article 241, or
(b) Chapter IV of Part V, Chapter V of Part VI, or Chapter I of Part XI, or
(c) any of the Lists in the Seventh Schedule, or
(d) the representation of States in Parliament, or
(e) the provisions of this article, the amendment shall also require to be ratified by the Legislatures of not less than one-half of the States specified in Parts A and B of the First Schedule by resolutions to that effect passed by those Legislatures before the Bill making provision for such amendment is presented to the President for assent.

(3) Nothing in article 13 shall apply to any amendment made under this article.

== Background ==
The 24th Amendment was effected to abrogate the Supreme Court ruling in Golaknath v. State of Punjab. The Supreme Court delivered its ruling, by a majority of 6-5 on 27 February 1967. The Court held that an amendment of the Constitution is a legislative process, and that an amendment under article 368 is "law" within the meaning of article 13 of the Constitution and therefore, if an amendment "takes away or abridges" a Fundamental Right conferred by Part III, it is void. Article 13(2) reads, "The State shall not make any law which takes away or abridges the right conferred by this Part and any law made in contravention of this clause shall, to the extent of contravention, be void." The Court also ruled that Fundamental Rights included in Part III of the Constitution are given a "transcendental position" under the Constitution and are kept beyond the reach of Parliament. The Court also held that the scheme of the Constitution and the nature of the freedoms it granted incapacitated Parliament from modifying, restricting or impairing Fundamental Freedoms in Part III.

The judgment reversed the Supreme Court's earlier decision which had upheld Parliament's power to amend all parts of the Constitution, including Part III related to Fundamental Rights. The judgement left Parliament with no power to curtail Fundamental Rights. To abrogate the ruling, the government intended to amend article 368 to provide expressly that Parliament has power to amend any provision of the Constitution, thereby bringing Fundamental Rights within the scope of its amending procedure.

== Proposal and enactment ==
The Constitution (Twenty-fourth Amendment) Bill, 1971 (Bill No. 105 of 1971) was introduced in the Lok Sabha on 28 July 1971 by H.R. Gokhale, then Minister of Law and Justice. The Bill sought to amend articles 13 and 368 of the Constitution. The full text of the Statement of Objects and Reasons appended to the bill is given below:

The Supreme Court in the well-known Golak Nath's case [1967, 2 S.C.R. 762] reversed, by a narrow majority, its own earlier decisions upholding the power of Parliament to amend all parts of the Constitution including Part III relating to fundamental rights. The result of the judgment is that Parliament is considered to have no power to take away or curtail any of the fundamental rights guaranteed by Part III of the Constitution even if it becomes necessary to do so for giving effect to the Directive Principles of State Policy and for the attainment of the objectives set out in the Preamble to the Constitution. It is, therefore, considered necessary to provide expressly that Parliament has power to amend any provision of the Constitution so as to include the provisions of Part III within the scope of the amending power.

2. The Bill seeks to amend article 368 suitably for the purpose and makes it clear that article 368 provides for amendment of the Constitution as well as procedure therefor. The Bill further provides that when a Constitution Amendment Bill passed by both Houses of Parliament is presented to the President for his assent, he should give his assent thereto. The Bill also seeks to amend article 13 of the Constitution to make it inapplicable to any amendment of the Constitution under article 368.

— H.R. Gokhale, "The Constitution (Twenty-fourth Amendment) Bill, 1971". This article incorporates text from this source, which is in the public domain.

The Bill was considered by the Lok Sabha on 3 and 4 August, and passed, in the original form, on 4 August 1971. While moving the bill for consideration in the Lok Sabha, Gokhale stated that the fear that Parliament would "misuse the power to curtail Fundamental Rights once it acquired the power to amend them, was unfounded." Gokhale further stated that Directive Principles must prevail over Fundamental Rights, in case of conflict between the two.

Union Education Minister Siddhartha Shankar Ray stated that allowing judgements like that in the Golaknath case would have "disastrous consequences". Congress member Darbara Singh felt that "the attitude of the Supreme Court must change with the times". A.K. Gopalan, leader of the Communist Party (Marxist) (CPM), supported the bill during the debate in the Lok Sabha on 3 August. Gopalan stated that the present Constitution was a "bundle of contradictions" drawn up by "representatives of princely houses and big business".

In response to critics of the amendment, Prime Minister Indira Gandhi stated, "we are committed to the upholding of the fundamental freedom – of assembly and of worship – and our commitment to secular democracy is non-negotiable".

The Bill, as passed by the Lok Sabha, was considered by the Rajya Sabha on 10 and 11 August and passed on 11 August 1971. The debate in the Rajya Sabha was brief.

The bill received assent from then President Varahagiri Venkata Giri on 5 November 1971. It was notified in The Gazette of India and came into force on the same day.

== Ratification ==
The Act was passed in accordance with the provisions of Article 368 of the Constitution, and was ratified by more than half of the State Legislatures, as required under Clause (2) of the said article. State Legislatures that ratified the amendment are listed below:

1. Andhra Pradesh
2. Haryana
3. Himachal Pradesh
4. Jammu and Kashmir
5. Kerala
6. Madhya Pradesh
7. Maharashtra
8. Nagaland
9. Tamil Nadu
10. Uttar Pradesh
11. West Bengal

Did not ratify:

1. Assam
2. Bihar
3. Gujarat
4. Mysore
5. Orissa
6. Punjab
7. Rajasthan

== Reception ==
The Hindu, in its editorial on 6 August 1971, stated, "All change and growth whether political or biological, have to conform to the basic laws of their province, or otherwise such growth would soon be found to be cancerous and self destructive. And even if certain urgently needed socio-economic changes call for a cribbling and cabining of the right property, the sweeping power conferred on Parliament by the 24th Amendment to tamper with all the rights, including the right to freedom of association and of religion, are such that it is not surprising that some leaders of minorities and some 'committed' socialists have been alarmed over the grim possibilities." In a 1971 editorial on the amendment, The Statesman wrote, "The implications are breath-taking. Parliament now has the power to deny the seven freedoms, abolish Constitutional remedies available to citizens, and to change the federal character of the Union."

Legal expert V. G. Ramachandran, writing in the Supreme Court Cases Journal in 1971, stated that the 24th and 25th Amendments were "not 'tinkering' with the Constitution. It is a veritable slaughter of the Constitution". He felt that the 25th Amendment "smacks of totalitarianism and hurry to achieve socialism instantly overnight".

Mahommedali Currim Chagla, former Chief Justice of the Bombay High Court, opposed the 24th Amendment. Former Attorney-General M.C. Setalvad described the 24th Amendment as "a complete negation of the rule of law", and stressed that apart from its effect on the Indian people, the amendment endangered government itself. Renowned jurists Kasturiranga Santhanam and Nanabhoy Palkhivala also opposed the amendment. The 24th Amendment was also opposed by B. Shiva Rao, Frank Anthony and all surviving members of the Constituent Assembly.

The 24th Amendment received little attention from the general public at the time of its enactment, as their attention was focused on tense relations between India and Pakistan due to the ongoing Bangladesh Liberation War, which later led to the Indo-Pakistani War of 1971.

== Aftermath ==
The 24th Amendment was the first of a series of measures taken by Indira Gandhi to increase her power, and establish one-party rule. It was followed by several constitutional amendments designed to weaken the judiciary, and enhance the authority of Parliament and the Prime Minister's Office. The most notable among these were the 25th, 38th and 39th Amendments, culminating in the 42nd Amendment in 1976 during The Emergency, which brought about the most sweeping changes to the Constitution in history.

=== Kesavananda Bharati case ===
The Supreme Court reviewed its decision in Golaknath v. State of Punjab, in 1971 in Kesavananda Bharati v. State of Kerala, and considered the validity of the 24th, 25th, 26th and 29th Amendments. The case was heard by the largest ever Constitutional Bench of 13 Judges. The Bench gave eleven judgements, which agreed on some points and differed on others. The Court held, by a margin of 7-6, that although no part of the Constitution, including Fundamental Rights, was beyond the amending power of Parliament (thus overruling the 1967 case), the "basic structure of the Constitution could not be abrogated even by a constitutional amendment".

The Court upheld Section 2(a) and 2(b), and the first part of section 3 of the 25th Amendment as valid. However, the second part namely "and no law containing a declaration that it is for giving effect to such policy shall be called in question in any court on the ground that it does not give effect to such policy" was declared unconstitutional.

The government of Indira Gandhi did not take kindly to this implied restriction on its powers by the court. On 26 April 1973, Justice Ajit Nath Ray, who was among the dissenters, was promoted to Chief Justice of India superseding three senior Judges, Shelat, Grover and Hegde, which was unprecedented in Indian legal history. Advocate C.K. Daphtary termed the incident as "the blackest day in the history of democracy". Justice Mohammad Hidayatullah (previous Chief Justice of India) remarked that "this was an attempt of not creating 'forward looking judges' but 'judges looking forward' to the office of Chief Justice".

The government enacted the 42nd Amendment in 1976, to abrogate the Kesavananda Bharati ruling

== See also ==
- Basic structure doctrine
- List of amendments of the Constitution of India
