= Fundamental Rights, Directive Principles, and Fundamental Duties of India =

Rights provided to Indian citizens

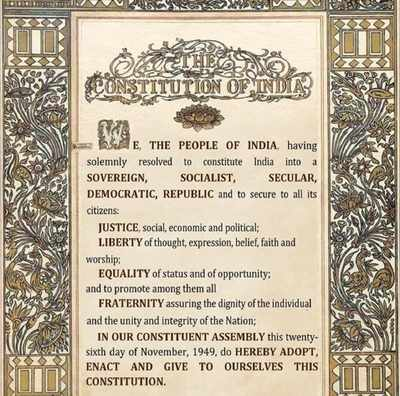
The Preamble of the Constitution of India – India declaring itself as a country.

The Fundamental Rights, Directive Principles of State Policy, and Fundamental Duties are sections of the Constitution of India that prescribe the fundamental obligations of the states to its citizens and the duties and the rights of the citizens to the State. (Note: According to Articles 12 and 36, the term State, for the purposes of the chapters on Fundamental Rights and Directive Principles, includes all authorities within the territory of India. It includes the Government of India, the Parliament of India, the Government and legislature of the states of India. It also includes all local or other authorities such as Municipal Corporations, Municipal Boards, District Boards, Panchayats etc. To avoid confusion with the term states, the administrative divisions, State (encompassing all the authorities in India) has been capitalized and the term state is in lowercase.) These sections are considered vital elements of the constitution, which was developed between 1949 by the Constituent Assembly of India.

The Fundamental Rights are defined in Part III of the Indian Constitution from article 12 to 35 and applied irrespective of race, birth place, religion, caste, creed, sex, gender, and equality of opportunity in matters of employment. They are enforceable by the courts, subject to specific restrictions.

The Directive Principles of State Policy are guidelines for the framing of laws by the government. These provisions, set out in Part IV of the Constitution, are not enforceable by the courts, but the principles on which they are based are fundamental guidelines for governance that the State is expected to apply in framing any policies and passing of laws.

The Fundamental Duties are defined as the moral obligations of all citizens to help promote a spirit of patriotism and to uphold the unity of India. These duties set out in Part IV–A of the Constitution, concern individuals and the nation. Like the Directive Principles, they are not enforceable by courts unless otherwise made enforceable by parliamentary law.

== History ==
The Fundamental Rights and Directive Principles had their origins in the Indian independence movement, which strove to achieve the limits of liberty and social welfare as the goals of an independent Indian state. The development of constitutional rights in India was inspired by historical documents such as England's Bill of Rights, the United States Bill of Rights and France's Declaration of the Rights of Man. The demand for civil liberties formed an important part of the Indian independence movement, with one of the objectives of the Indian National Congress (INC) being to end discrimination between the British rulers and their Indian subjects. This demand was explicitly mentioned in resolutions adopted by the INC between 1917 and 1919. The demands articulated in these resolutions included granting to Indians the rights to equality before the law, free speech, trial by juries composed at least half of Indian members, political power, and equal terms for bearing arms as British citizens.

The unsatisfactory Montagu–Chelmsford Reforms of 1919, and the rise to prominence of M. K. Gandhi in the Indian independence movement marked a change in the attitude of its leaders towards articulating demands for civil rights. The focus shifted from demanding equality of status between Indians and the British to assuring liberty for all Indians. The Commonwealth of India Bill, drafted by Annie Besant in 1925, specifically included demands for seven fundamental rights – individual liberty, freedom of conscience, free expression of opinion, freedom of assembly, non-discrimination on the ground of sex, free elementary education and free use of public spaces. In 1927, the INC resolved to set up a committee to draft a "Swaraj Constitution" for India based on a declaration of rights that would provide safeguards against oppression. The 11-member committee, led by Motilal Nehru, was constituted in 1928. Its report made a number of recommendations, including proposing guaranteed fundamental rights to all Indians. These rights resembled those of the American Constitution and those adopted by post-war European countries, and several of them were adopted from the 1925 Bill. Several of these provisions were later replicated in various parts of the Indian Constitution, including the Fundamental Right itself to the defence of civil rights and economic freedom, with the stated objectives of putting an end to exploitation, providing social security and implementing land reforms. Other new rights proposed by the resolution were the prohibition of State titles, universal adult franchise, the abolition of capital punishment and freedom of movement. Drafted by Jawaharlal Nehru, the resolution, which later formed the basis for some of the Directive Principles, placed the primary responsibility of carrying out social reform on the State, and marked the increasing influence of socialism and Gandhian philosophy on the independence movement. The final phase of the Independence movement saw a reiteration of the socialist principles of the 1930s, along with an increased focus on minority rights – which had become an issue of major political concern by then – which were published in the Sapru Report in 1945. The report, apart from stressing on protecting the rights of minorities, also sought to prescribe a "The Fundamental Rights and Directive Principles had their origins in the Indian independence movement, which strove to achieve the values of liberty and social welfare as the goals of an independent Indian state. The development of constitutional rights in India was inspired by historical documents such as England's Bill of Rights, the United States Bill of Rights and France's Declaration of the Rights of Man. The demand for civil liberties formed an important part of the Indian independence movement, with one of the objectives of the Indian National Congress (INC) being to end discrimination between the British rulers and their Indian subjects. This demand was explicitly mentioned in resolutions adopted by the INC between 1917 and 1919. The demands articulated in these resolutions included granting to Indians the rights to equality before the law, free speech, trial by juries composed at least half of Indian members, political power, and equal terms for bearing arms as British citizens. standard of conduct for the legislatures, government and the courts".

During the final stages of the British Raj, the 1946 Cabinet Mission to India proposed a Constituent Assembly to draft a Constitution for India as part of the process of transfer of power. The Constituent Assembly of India, composed of indirectly elected representatives from the British provinces and Princely states, commenced its proceedings in December 1946, and completed drafting the Constitution of India by November 1949. According to the Cabinet Mission plan, the Assembly was to have an Advisory Committee to advise it on the nature and extent of fundamental rights, protection of minorities and administration of tribal areas. Accordingly, the Advisory Committee was constituted in January 1947 with 64 members, and from among these a twelve-member sub-committee on Fundamental Rights was appointed under the chairmanship of J. B. Kripalani in February 1947. The sub-committee drafted the Fundamental Rights and submitted its report to the committee by April 1947, and later that month the Committee placed it before the Assembly, which debated and discussed the rights over the course of the following year, adopting the drafts of most of them by, December 1948. The drafting of the Fundamental Rights was influenced by the adoption of the Universal Declaration of Human Rights by the U.N. General Assembly and the activities of the United Nations Human Rights Commission, as well as decisions of the U.S. Supreme Court in interpreting the Bill of Rights in the American Constitution. The Directive Principles, which were also drafted by the sub-committee on Fundamental Rights, expounded the socialist precepts of the Indian independence movement, and were inspired by similar principles contained in the Irish Constitution. The Fundamental Duties were later added to the Constitution by the 42nd Amendment in 1976.

== Fundamental Rights ==
The Fundamental Rights, embodied in Part III of the Constitution, guarantee civil rights to all Indians and prevent the State from encroaching an individual's liberty while simultaneously placing upon it an obligation to protect the citizens' rights from encroachment by society.

Seven main fundamental rights were originally provided by the Constitution:

1. Right to equality 2. Right to freedom 3. Right against exploitation 4. Right to freedom of religion 5. Cultural and 6. Educational rights, and 7. Right to constitutional remedies.

However, the right to property was removed from Part III of the Constitution by the 44th Amendment in 1978. (Note: The right to property is still a Constitutionally recognised right, but is now contained outside the Part on Fundamental Rights, in Article 300A which states: No person shall be deprived of his property save by authority of law.) The purpose of the Fundamental Rights is to preserve individual liberty and democratic principles based on equality of all members of society. Dr. Ambedkar said that the responsibility of the legislature is not just to provide fundamental rights but also and rather, more importantly, to safeguard them.

They act as limitations on the powers of the legislature and executive, under Article 13, (Note: According to Article 13, The State shall not make any law which takes away or abridges the rights conferred by this Part and any law made in contravention of this clause shall, to the extent of the contravention, be void. The term law has been defined to include not only legislation made by Parliament and the legislatures of the states, but also ordinances, rules, regulations, bye laws, notifications, or customs having the force of law.) and in case of any violation of these rights the Supreme Court of India and the High Courts of the states have the power to declare such legislative or executive action as unconstitutional and void. These rights are largely enforceable against the State, which as per the wide definition provided in Article 12, includes not only the legislative and executive wings of the federal and state governments, but also local administrative authorities and other agencies and institutions which discharge public functions or are of a governmental character. However, there are certain rights – such as those in Articles 15, 17, 18, 23, 24 – that are also available against private individuals. Further, certain Fundamental Rights – including those under Articles 14, 20, 21, 25 – apply to persons of any nationality upon Indian soil, while others – such as those under Articles 15, 16, 19, 30 – are applicable only to citizens of India.

The Fundamental Rights are not absolute and are subject to reasonable restrictions as necessary for the protection of public interest. In the Kesavananda Bharati v. State of Kerala case in 1973, (Note: His Holiness Kesavananda Bharati v. State of Kerala, AIR 1973 SC 1461. This was popularly known as the Fundamental Rights Case.) the Supreme Court, overruling a previous decision of 1967, held that the Fundamental Rights could be amended, subject to judicial review in case such an amendment violated the basic structure of the Constitution. The Fundamental Rights can be enhanced, removed or otherwise altered through a constitutional amendment, passed by a two-thirds majority of each House of Parliament. The imposition of a state of emergency may lead to a temporary suspension any of the Fundamental Rights, excluding Articles 20 and 21, by order of the President. The President may, by order, suspend the right to constitutional remedies as well, thereby barring citizens from approaching the Supreme Court for the enforcement of any of the Fundamental Rights, except Articles 20 and 21, during the period of the emergency. Parliament may also restrict the application of the Fundamental Rights to members of the Indian Armed Forces and the police, in order to ensure proper discharge of their duties and the maintenance of discipline, by a law made under Article 33.

== Directive Principles of State Policy ==
The Directive Principles of State Policy, embodied in Part IV of the Constitution, are directions given to the state to guide the establishment of an economic and social democracy, as proposed by the Preamble. They set forth the humanitarian and socialist instructions that were the aim of social revolution envisaged in India by the Constituent Assembly. The state is expected to keep these principles in mind while framing laws and policies, even though they are non-justiciable in nature. The Directive Principles may be classified under the following categories: ideals that the state ought to strive towards achieving; directions for the exercise of legislative and executive power; and rights of the citizens which the State must aim towards securing.

Despite being non-justiciable, the Directive Principles act as a check on the state; theorised as a yardstick in the hands of the electorate and the opposition to measure the performance of a government at the time of an election. Article 37, while stating that the Directive Principles are not enforceable in any court of law, declares them to be "fundamental to the governance of the country" and imposes an obligation on the State to apply them in matters of legislation. Thus, they serve to emphasise the welfare state model of the Constitution and emphasise the positive duty of the state to promote the welfare of the people by affirming social, economic and political justice, as well as to fight income inequality and ensure individual dignity, as mandated.

Article 39 lays down certain principles of policy to be followed by the State, including providing an adequate means of livelihood for all citizens, equal pay for equal work for men and women, proper working conditions, reduction of the concentration of wealth and means of production from the hands of a few, and distribution of community resources to "subserve the common good". These clauses highlight the Constitutional objectives of building an egalitarian social order and establishing a welfare state, by bringing about a social revolution assisted by the State, and have been used to support the nationalisation of mineral resources as well as public utilities. Further, several legislation pertaining to agrarian reform and land tenure have been enacted by the federal and state governments, in order to ensure equitable distribution of land resources.

Articles 41–43 mandate the State to endeavour to secure to all citizens the right to work, a living wage, social security, maternity relief, and a decent standard of living. These provisions aim at establishing a socialist state as envisaged in the Preamble. Article 43 also places upon the State the responsibility of promoting cottage industries, and the federal government has, in furtherance of this, established several Boards for the promotion of khadi, handlooms etc., in coordination with the state governments. Article 39A requires the State to provide free legal aid to ensure that opportunities for securing justice are available to all citizens irrespective of economic or other disabilities. Article 43A mandates the State to work towards securing the participation of workers in the management of industries. The State, under Article 46, is also mandated to promote the interests of and work for the economic uplift of the scheduled castes and scheduled tribes and protect them from discrimination and exploitation. Several enactments, including two Constitutional amendments, have been passed to give effect to this provision.

Article 44 encourages the State to secure a uniform civil code for all citizens, by eliminating discrepancies between various personal laws currently in force in the country. However, this has remained a "dead letter" despite numerous reminders from the Supreme Court to implement the provision. Article 45 originally mandated the State to provide free and compulsory education to children between the ages of six and fourteen years, but after the 86th Amendment in 2002, this has been converted into a Fundamental Right and replaced by an obligation upon the State to secure childhood care to all children below the age of six. Article 47 commits the State to raise the standard of living and improve public health, and prohibit the consumption of intoxicating drinks and drugs injurious to health. As a consequence, partial or total prohibition has been introduced in several states, but financial constraints have prevented its full-fledged application. The State is also mandated by Article 48 to organise agriculture and animal husbandry on modern and scientific lines by improving breeds and prohibiting slaughter of cattle. Article 48A mandates the State to protect the environment and safeguard the forests and wildlife of the country, while Article 49 places an obligation upon the State to ensure the preservation of monuments and objects of national importance. Article 50 requires the State to ensure the separation of judiciary from executive in public services, in order to ensure judicial independence, and federal legislation has been enacted to achieve this objective. The State, according to Article 51, must also strive for the promotion of international peace and security, and Parliament has been empowered under Article 253 to make laws giving effect to international treaties.

== Fundamental Duties ==
Any act of disrespect towards the Indian National Flag is illegal.

The fundamental duties of citizens were added to the constitution by the 42nd Amendment in 1976, upon the recommendations of the Swaran Singh Committee that was constituted by the government earlier that year. Originally ten in number, the fundamental duties were increased to eleven by the 86th Amendment in 2002, which added a duty on every parent or guardian to ensure that their child or ward was provided opportunities for education between the ages of six and fourteen years. The other fundamental duties obligate all citizens to respect the national symbols of India, including the constitution, to cherish its heritage, preserve its composite culture and assist in its defence. They also obligate all Indians to promote the spirit of common brotherhood, protect the environment and public property, develop scientific temper, abjure violence, and strive towards excellence in all spheres of life. In case of violation of fundamental duties enshrined in the constitution by a citizen including President, Vice President, Speaker, parliament members, state legislative members, etc., it amounts to contempt of the constitution which is punishable under Prevention of Insults to National Honour Act, 1971. Supreme court has ruled that these fundamental duties can also help the court to decide the constitutionality of a law passed by the legislature. There is reference to such duties in international instruments such as the Universal Declaration of Human Rights and International Covenant on Civil and Political Rights, and Article 51A brings the Indian constitution into conformity with these treaties.

The fundamental duties noted in the constitution are as follows:

It shall be the duty of every citizen of India —

1. To abide by the Constitution and respect its ideals and institutions, the National Flag and the National Anthem;
2. To cherish and follow the noble ideals which inspired our national struggle for freedom;
3. To uphold and protect the sovereignty, unity, and integrity of India;
4. To defend the country and render national service when called upon to do so;
5. To promote harmony and the spirit of common brotherhood amongst all the people of India transcending religious, linguistic, and regional or sectional diversities; to renounce practices derogatory to the dignity of women;
6. To value and preserve the rich heritage of our composite culture;
7. To protect and improve the natural environment including forests, lakes, rivers, wildlife and to have compassion for living creatures;
8. To develop the scientific temper, humanism, and the spirit of inquiry and reform;
9. To safeguard public property and to abjure violence;
10. To strive towards excellence in all spheres of individual and collective activity so that the nation constantly rises to higher levels of endeavor and achievement;
11. Who is a parent or guardian, to provide opportunities for education to his child, or as the case may be, ward between the age of six to fourteen years. (Note: Fundamental Duty #11 was added after 86th constitution amendments in 2002.)

== Criticism and analysis ==
Employment of children in hazardous jobs, prevalently as domestic help, violates the spirit of the constitution in the eyes of many critics and human rights advocates. 16.5 million children are in employment. India was ranked 88 out of 159 countries in 2005, according to the degree to which corruption is perceived to exist among public officials and politicians. The year 1990–1991 was declared as the "Year of Social Justice" in the memory of B.R. Ambedkar. The government provides free textbooks to students belonging to scheduled castes and tribes pursuing medicine and engineering courses. During 2002–2003, a sum of Rs. 4.77 crore (47.7 million) was released for this purpose. In order to protect scheduled castes and tribes from discrimination, the government enacted the Scheduled Caste and Scheduled Tribe (Prevention of Atrocities) Act, 1989, prescribing severe punishments for such actions.

The Minimum Wages Act of 1948 empowers government to fix minimum wages for people working across the economic spectrum. The Consumer Protection Act of 1986 provides for the better protection of consumers. The Equal Remuneration Act of 1976 provides for equal pay for equal work for both men and women. The Sampoorna Grameen Rozgar Yojana (Universal Rural Employment Program) was launched in 2001 to attain the objective of providing gainful employment for the rural poor. The program was implemented through the Panchayati Raj institutions.

A system of elected village councils, known as Panchayati Raj covers almost all states and territories of India. One-third of the total of number of seats have been reserved for women in Panchayats at every level; and in the case of Bihar, half the seats have been reserved for women. The judiciary has been separated from the executive "in all the states and territories except Jammu and Kashmir and Nagaland." India supported the United Nations in peace-keeping activities, with the Indian Army having participated in 37 UN peace-keeping operations.

The implementation of a uniform civil code for all citizens has not been achieved owing to widespread opposition from various religious groups and political parties. The Shah Bano case (1985–86) provoked a political firestorm in India when the Supreme Court ruled that Shah Bano, a Muslim woman who had been divorced by her husband in 1978 was entitled to receive alimony from her former husband under Indian law applicable for all Indian women. This decision evoked outrage in the Muslim community, which sought the application of the Muslim personal law and in response the Parliament passed the Muslim Women (Protection of Rights on Divorce) Act, 1986 overturning the Supreme Court's verdict. This act provoked further outrage, as jurists, critics and politicians alleged that the fundamental right of equality for all citizens irrespective of religion or gender was being jettisoned to preserve the interests of distinct religious communities. The verdict and the legislation remain a source of heated debate, with many citing the issue as a prime example of the poor implementation of Fundamental Rights.

Per Article 38 (1), prompt rendering of the justice by courts is part of animating judiciary. Rendering prompt justice is the foremost purpose of the constitution as enshrined in the Preamble to the Constitution also. However the judiciary is failing in this respect by causing inordinate delay considering time of rendering justice in a case arbitrarily is its constitutional liberty.

Most of the fundamental rights are violated in courtrooms in either criminal cases or civil cases. Before they get into the court with their matters everyone should be aware of these 5 writs which are 1. Habeas Corpus, 2. Mandamus, 3. Certiorari, 4. Prohibition, 5. Quo Warranto.

== Relationship between the Fundamental Rights, Directive Principles and Fundamental Duties ==
The Directive Principles have been used to uphold the Constitutional validity of legislations in case of a conflict with the Fundamental Rights. Article 31C, added by the 25th Amendment in 1971, provided that any law made to give effect to the Directive Principles in Article 39(b)–(c) would not be invalid on the grounds that they derogated from the Fundamental Rights conferred by Articles 14, 19 and 21. The application of this article was sought to be extended to all the Directive Principles by the 42nd Amendment in 1976, but the Supreme Court struck down the extension as void on the ground that it violated the basic structure of the Constitution. The Fundamental Rights and Directive Principles have also been used together in forming the basis of legislation for social welfare. The Supreme Court, after the judgment in the Kesavananda Bharati case, has adopted the view of the Fundamental Rights and Directive Principles being complementary to each other, each supplementing the other's role in aiming at the same goal of establishing a welfare state by means of social revolution. Similarly, the Supreme Court has used the Fundamental Duties to uphold the Constitutional validity of statutes which seeks to promote the objects laid out in the Fundamental Duties. These Duties have also been held to be obligatory for all citizens, subject to the State enforcing the same by means of a valid law. The Supreme Court has also issued directions to the State in this regard, with a view towards making the provisions effective and enabling citizens to properly perform their duties.

== See also ==
- Fundamental Rights in India
- Writs in Indian law
- Human rights in India
- Constitutional economics
- Rule according to higher law
