= Article 30 of the Constitution of India =

Provides equality before the law, equal protection

Article 30 is an article of the Constitution of India under which the right of minorities to establish and administer educational institutions is described. It is included in Part 3 of the Constitution. Article 30 protects the rights of minority communities to develop and manage educational institutions of their choice. All minorities, whether based on religion or language, have the right to develop and manage educational institutions of their choice.

In a judgment in the case of Malankara Syrian Catholic College case (2007) the Hon’ble Supreme Court held that the rights given to the minority communities under Article 30 are only to ensure equality with the majority and are not intended to place the minorities in a more advantageous position than the majority.

== Background ==
The draft Article 23A (Article 30) was debated on 8 December 1948. This allowed minorities to set up and administer their own educational institutions.

This draft article was initially clause (3) of draft article 23. It was debated separately from draft article 23(1)-(2) on a member's motion.

One member proposed to give linguistic minorities the right to receive primary education in their own language and script. He invoked similar provisions in the Nehru Report of 1928 and a government proposal in 1948. One member wanted to qualify this proposal by putting the condition that sufficient numbers of such students be available. He pointed out that the constitutional right to freedom of movement meant that people of diverse linguistic backgrounds would settle across the country, and they should not be denied this right. Another member supported this second proposal, arguing that the first was not economically feasible. The Assembly, however, rejected both proposals.

The draft article was adopted without amendment on 8 December 1948.

(1) All minorities, whether based on religion or language, shall have the right to establish and administer educational institutions of their choice.

(1A) In making any law providing for the compulsory acquisition of any property of an educational institution established and administered by a minority, referred to in clause (1), the State shall ensure that the amount fixed by or determined under such law for the acquisition of such property is such as would not restrict or abrogate the right guaranteed under that clause.

(2) The State shall not, in granting aid to educational institutions, discriminate against any educational institution on the ground that it is under the management of a minority, whether based on religion or language.

== See also ==
- Article 41 of the Constitution of India
