= Lawmaking procedure in India =

This is a brief description of the lawmaking procedure in India.

== Lawmaking bodies ==
As per provisions made in the Constitution of India (Article 368), the laws of India are made by the Parliament for the whole country or partly and by the state legislative assembly for their respective states.

== Constituent power of Parliament ==
The process of addition, variation or repeal of any part of the Constitution by the Parliament under its constituent powers, is called amendment of the Constitution. The procedure is laid out in Article 368. An amendment bill must be passed by each House of the Parliament by a majority of the total membership of that House when at least two-thirds of the members are present and voting. In addition to this, certain amendments which pertain to the federal and judicial aspects of the Constitution must be ratified by a majority of state legislatures. There is no provision for joint sitting of the two houses (Lok Sabha and Rajya Sabha) of the Parliament to pass a constitutional amendment bill. The basic structure of the Indian Constitution cannot be altered or destroyed through constitutional amendments under the constituent powers of the Parliament without undergoing judicial review by the Supreme Court. After the 24th Amendment, Parliament in its constituent capacity can not delegate its function of amending the Constitution to another legislature or to itself in its ordinary legislative capacity.

Proclamation of emergency per Article 352 (6) shall be ratified by the Parliament similar to its constituent power. When president's rule is invoked in a state using Article 356 (c) and its proclamation contains such incidental and consequential provisions suspending in whole or in part the operation of any provisions of the Constitution relating to any body or authority in the state for giving effect to the objects of the proclamation, the proclamation needs to be approved post facto by the Parliament under its constituent power (i.e. not by simple majority) after the 24th Amendment

== Legislative powers ==
The legislative power of the states and the center are defined in the Constitution and these powers are divided into three lists. The subjects that are not mentioned in any of the three lists are known as residuary subjects. Subject to the provisions in the Constitution elsewhere, the power to legislate on residuary subjects, rests with Parliament or state legislative assembly as the case may be per Article 245. Deemed amendments to the Constitution which could be passed under legislative powers of Parliament, are no more valid after the addition of Article 368 (1) by 24th Amendment.

=== Union List ===
The Union List consists of 97 items on which the Parliament has exclusive power to legislate.

=== State List ===
The State List consists of 61 items (previously 66 items) where a state legislative assembly can make laws applicable in that state. But in certain circumstances, the Parliament can also legislate temporarily on subjects mentioned in the State List, when the Rajya Sabha has passed a resolution with two-thirds majority that it is expedient to legislate in the national interest per Articles 249 to 252 of the Constitution.

=== Concurrent List ===
The Concurrent List consists of 52 (earlier 47) items where both Parliament and a state legislative assembly can make laws in their domains subject to Articles 254 of the Constitution .

== Nature of people's mandate ==
The powers of a ruling party or co-alliance of the union is depending on the extent of the mandate it receives from the elections at central and state levels. These are:

- commanding simple majority in the Lok Sabha only permits to form the government and run the government by passing money bills only. President cannot issue ordinances on advice of the union cabinet alone as there is possibility of Rajya Sabha not according its approval.
- commanding simple majority in the Lok Sabha and Rajya Sabha (together or separately) permits to run the government by its legislative powers only. With simple majority in Rajya Sabha, ruling party or co-alliance can remove the vice president and elect a new vice president per Article 67(b)
- commanding two-thirds majority in both Lok Sabha and Rajya Sabha separately permits to run the government by its constituent and legislative powers. Ruling government has full powers to impeach the president and judges of Supreme Court / high courts when charges of violating the Constitution are established by judicial inquiry.
- commanding two-thirds majority in either house of Parliament capable to run the government by its legislative powers only. As per the procedure given by Article 61(3) or 124(4 & 5) or 217(1.b), the President and judges of Supreme Court or high courts can be forced to resign after charges of misbehavior or incapacity are established by means of judicial inquiry.

At the state level, a simple majority in the legislative assembly (Vidhan Sabha) is enough to exercise all its constitutional powers except for deciding to have or abolish the legislative council per Article 169. Per Article 252, approval of state legislative council, if existing, is also required to permit the Parliament in making laws which are exclusively reserved to state legislative assembly.

== Difference between a Bill and an Act ==
Legislative proposals are brought before either house of the Parliament of India in the form of a bill. A bill is the draft of a legislative proposal, which, when passed by both houses of Parliament and assented to by the President, becomes an act of Parliament. As soon as the bill has been framed, it has to be published in the newspapers and the general public is asked to comment in a democratic manner. The bill may then be amended to incorporate the public opinion in a constructive manner and then may be introduced in the Parliament by ministers or private members. The former are called government bills and the latter, private member's bill. Bills may also be classified as public bills and private bills. A public bill is one referring to a matter applying to the public in general, whereas a private bill relates to a particular person or corporation or institution. The Orphanages and Charitable Homes Bill or the Muslim Waqfs Bills are examples of private bills. A bill introduced in Lok Sabha pending for any reason lapses when the Lok Sabha is dissolved. However, bills in the Rajya Sabha never lapse, and can remain pending for decades.

Every bill to be taken up by the Rajya Sabha shall be examined for its constitutional validity by the vice president for not violating the constitutional stipulations/procedures. Vice president should not permit constitutional amendments to be passed under ordinary legislation. Article 71(1) of the constitution permits Supreme Court to inquire and decide on constitutional violation committed by the vice president. Any citizen of India who has violated constitution shall not be eligible to continue as a parliament member or eligible to be elected as parliament member. Supreme court can remove the vice president for the electoral malpractices or upon being not eligible to be a Rajya Sabha member under the Representation of the People Act, 1951.

== How a bill becomes an act in Parliament ==
A bill is the draft of a legislative proposal. It has to pass through various stages before it becomes an act of Parliament. There are three stages through which a bill has to pass in one house of Parliament. The procedure is similar for the legislative assemblies of states.

=== First reading ===
The legislative process begins with the introduction of a bill in either house of Parliament, i.e. the Lok Sabha or the Rajya Sabha. A bill can be introduced either by a minister or by a private member. In the former case it is known as a government bill and in the latter case it is known as a private member's bill. It is necessary for a member-in-charge of the bill to ask for the leave of the house to introduce the bill. If leave is granted by the house, the bill is introduced. This stage is known as the first reading of the bill. If the motion for leave to introduce a bill is opposed, the speaker may, in his discretion, allow a brief explanatory statement to be made by the member who opposes the motion and the member-in-charge who moved the motion. Where a motion for leave to introduce a bill is opposed on the ground that the bill initiates legislation outside the legislative competence of the house, the speaker may permit a full discussion thereon. Thereafter, the question is put to the vote of the house. However, the motion for leave to introduce a finance bill or an appropriation bill is forthwith put to the vote of the house. Money/appropriation bills and financial bills can be introduced only in the Lok Sabha per Articles 109, 110 and 117. The Speaker of Lok Sabha decides whether a bill is a money bill or not. The vice-president of India, who is ex-officio Chairman of the Rajya Sabha, decides whether a bill is a money bill or not when the bill is introduced in the Rajya Sabha.

==== Publication in the official gazette ====
After a bill has been introduced, it is published in The Gazette of India. Even before introduction, a bill might, be published in the Gazette on the permission of the speaker. In such cases, leave to introduce the bill the house is not asked for and the bill is straight away introduced.

==== Reference of bill to the standing committee ====
After a bill has been introduced, the presiding officer of the concerned house (speaker of the Lok Sabha or the chairman of the Rajya Sabha or anyone acting on their behalf) can refer the bill to the concerned standing committee for examination and to prepare a report thereon. If a bill is referred to a standing committee, the committee shall consider the general principles and clauses of the bill referred to them and make a report thereon. The committee can also seek expert opinion or the public opinion of those interested in the measure. After the bill has thus been considered, the committee submits its report to the house. The report of the committee, being of persuasive value, shall be treated as considered advice.

=== Second reading ===
The second reading consists of consideration of the bill which occurs in two stages.

==== First stage ====
The first stage consists of general discussion on the bill as a whole when the principle underlying the bill is discussed. At this stage it is open to the house to refer the bill to a select committee of the house or a joint committee of the two houses or to circulate it for the purpose of eliciting opinion thereon or to straight away take it into consideration.

If a bill is referred to a select or joint committee, the committee considers the bill clause-by-clause just as the house does. Amendments can be moved to the various clauses by members of the committee. The committee can also take evidence of associations, public bodies or experts who are interested in the measure. After the bill has thus been considered, the committee submits its report to the house which considers the bill again as reported by the committee. If a bill is circulated for the purpose of eliciting public opinion thereon, such opinions are obtained through the governments of the states and union territories. Opinions so received are laid on the table of the house and the next motion in regard to the bill must be for its reference to a select/joint committee. It is not ordinarily permissible at this stage to move the motion for consideration of the bill.

==== Second stage ====
The second stage of the second reading consists of clause-by-clause consideration of the bill as introduced or as reported by select or joint committee. Discussion takes place on each clause of the bill and amendments to clauses can be moved at this stage. Amendments to a clause have been moved but not withdrawn are put to the vote of the house before the relevant clause is disposed of by the house. The amendments become part of the bill if they are accepted by a majority of members present and voting. After the clauses, the schedules if any, clause 1, the enacting formula and the long title of the bill have been adopted by the house, the second reading is deemed to be over.

=== Third and the last reading ===
Thereafter, the member-in-charge can move that the bill be passed. This stage is known as the third reading of the bill. At this stage the debate is confined to arguments either in support or rejection of the bill without referring to the details thereof further than that are absolutely necessary. Only formal, verbal or consequential amendments are allowed to be moved at this stage. In passing an ordinary bill, a simple majority of members present and voting is necessary. But in the case of a bill to amend the Constitution, a majority of the total membership of the house and a majority of not less than two-thirds of the members present and voting is required in each house of Parliament. If the number of votes in favor and against the bill are tied, then the presiding officer of the concerned house can cast his/her vote, referred to as a casting vote right.

=== Passing a bill ===
If at any time during a meeting of a house there is no quorum, which is a minimum of one-tenth of the total strength of a house, it is the duty of the chairman or speaker, or person acting as such, either to adjourn the house or to suspend the meeting until the quorum is met. The bills taken up under legislative power of Parliament are treated as passed provided majority of members present at that time approved the bill either by voting or voice vote. It is also right of a member to demand voting instead of voice vote. In case of passing a constitutional amendment bill, two-thirds of the total members present and voted in favor of the bill with more than half of the total membership of a house present and voting in all, is required according to Article 368 of the Constitution.

=== Bill in the other house ===
After the bill is passed by one house of Parliament, it is sent to the other house for concurrence with a message to that effect, and there also it goes through the stages described above, except the introduction stage. If a bill passed by one house is amended by the other house, it is sent back to the originating house for approval. If the originating house does not agree with the amendments, it will be that the two houses have disagreed. The other house may keep a money bill for 14 days and an ordinary bill for six months without passing (or rejecting) it. If it fails to return the bill within the fixed time, the bill is deemed to be passed by both the houses and is sent for the approval of the President.

At the state level, it is not mandatory that a bill shall be passed by the legislative council (if existing) per Articles 196 to 199. There is no provision of conducting joint session of both houses to pass a bill.

=== Joint session of both houses ===
In case of a deadlock between the two houses or in a case where more than six months lapse in the other house, the President may summon, though is not bound to, a joint session of the two houses which is presided over by the Speaker of the Lok Sabha and the deadlock is resolved by simple majority. To date, only three bills - the Dowry Prohibition Act (1961), the Banking Service Commission Repeal Bill (1978) and the Prevention of Terrorist Activities Act (2002) have been passed at joint sessions.

=== President's approval ===
When a bill has been passed by both houses following the described process, it is sent to the President for his approval per Article 111. The President can assent or withhold his assent to a bill or he can return a bill, other than a money bill which is recommended by the President himself to the houses. However Article 255 says that prior recommendation of the President or the Governor of a state wherever stipulated is not compulsory for an act of Parliament or of the legislature of a state but the final consent of the President or Governor is mandatory. If the President is of the view that a particular bill passed under the legislative powers of Parliament violates the Constitution, he can return the bill with his recommendations to pass the bill under the constituent powers of Parliament following the Article 368 procedure. The President shall not withhold constitutional amendment bill duly passed by Parliament per Article 368. If the President gives his assent, the bill is published in The Gazette of India and becomes an act from the date of his assent. If he withholds his assent, the bill is dropped, which is known as absolute veto. The President can exercise absolute veto on aid and advice of the Council of Ministers per Article 111 and Article 74. The President may also effectively withhold his assent as per his own discretion, which is known as pocket veto. The pocket veto has only been exercised once by President Zail Singh in 1986, over the Postal Act which allowed the government to open postal letters without warrant by amending the Indian Post Office Act, 1898. If the President returns it for reconsideration, the Parliament must discuss once again, but if it is passed again and returned to the President, he must give his assent to it. If Parliament is not happy with the President for not assenting a bill passed by it under its legislative powers, the bill can be modified as a constitutional amendment bill and passed under its constituent powers for compelling the president to give assent. In case a constitutional amendment act is violating the basic structure of the Constitution, the constitutional bench of the Supreme Court would quash the act. When Parliament is of the view that the actions of the President are violating the Constitution, impeachment proceedings against the president could be taken up to remove him under Article 61 where at least two-thirds of the total membership of each house of Parliament should vote in favor of the impeachment when charges against the president are found valid in an investigation.

In case of a bill passed by the legislative assembly of a state, the consent of that state's governor has to be obtained. Some times the governor may refer the bill to the president anticipating clash between other central laws or constitution and decision of the president is final per Articles 200 and 201.

All decisions of the Union Cabinet are to be assented by the President for issuing gazette order. In case the Cabinet decisions are not in the purview of the established law, the President shall not give assent to the Cabinet decisions. He may indicate that the Union Cabinet has to pass the necessary legislation by the Parliament to clear the Cabinet decision. A minister is not supposed to take any decision without being considered by the Union Council of Ministers per Article 78(c).

The purpose of framing the Indian Constitution is to serve with honesty, efficiency and impartiality for the betterment of its citizens by the people who are heading or representing the independent institutions created by the Constitution such as judiciary, legislature, executive, President of India, etc. When one or more institutions are failing in their duty, the remaining shall normally take the lead in correcting the situation by using checks and balances as per the provisions available in the Constitution.

=== Coming into force ===
Generally, most acts will come into force, or become legally enforceable in a manner as mentioned in the act itself. Either it would come into effect from the date of assent by the President (mostly in case of ordinances which are later approved by the Parliament), or a specific date as mentioned in the act itself (mostly in the case of finance bills) or on a date as per the wish of the central or the state government as the case may be. In case the commencement of the act is as per the wish of the government, a separate Gazette notification is published, which is mostly accompanied by the rules or subordinate legislation in another Gazette notification.

== Money bill ==
Bills which exclusively contain provisions for imposition and abolition of taxes, for appropriation of moneys out of the Consolidated Fund, etc., are certified as money bills by the Speaker of the Lok Sabha. Money bills can be introduced only in Lok Sabha on the recommendation of the President per Articles 109, 110 and 117. For every fiscal year, the annual budget or annual financial statement with demand for grants on the recommendation of the President per Articles 112 to 116 shall be passed by the Lok Sabha. The Rajya Sabha cannot make amendments to a money bill passed by the Lok Sabha and sent to it. It can, however, recommend amendments in a money bill, but must return all money bills to Lok Sabha within fourteen days from the date of their receipt. The Lok Sabha can choose to accept or reject any or all of the recommendations of the Rajya Sabha with regard to a money bill. If the Lok Sabha accepts any of the recommendations of the Rajya Sabha, the money bill is deemed to have been passed by both houses with amendments recommended by Rajya Sabha and accepted by Lok Sabha. If the Lok Sabha does not accept any of the recommendations of Rajya Sabha, the money bill is deemed to have been passed by both houses in the form in which it was passed by Lok Sabha without any of the amendments recommended by Rajya Sabha. If a money bill passed by the Lok Sabha and transmitted to the Rajya Sabha for its recommendations is not returned to the Lok Sabha within fourteen days, it is deemed to have been passed by both houses at the expiration of the period in the form in which it was passed by the Lok Sabha. When a money bill introduced in the Lok Sabha by the government fails to get its approval, the ruling party is treated as not commanding the majority support in the Lok Sabha or shall be dismissed by the President to pave way for new government / fresh elections or opposition would move no confidence motion.

At state level also money bills shall be introduced in the legislative assembly only per Articles 198, 199 and 207 on the recommendation of the Governor. When a money bill introduced in the legislative assembly by the state government fails to get its approval, the ruling party is treated as not commanding the majority support in the legislative assembly or shall be dismissed by the governor to pave way for new government / fresh elections or opposition would move no confidence motion.

== Ordinances ==
When both houses of Parliament are not in session, extant provisions of law are felt inadequate, under compelling circumstances and the President is satisfied for the need of immediate action, he/she may promulgate such required ordinances under Article 123 of the Constitution. An ordinance has same force and effect as an act of Parliament. Every ordinance shall cease to operate if not passed by the Parliament before the expiration of six weeks from its reassembly. The President shall not issue any ordinance which needs an amendment to the Constitution or which violates the Constitution. When the state assembly is not in session, the Governor of a state can issue ordinances per Article 213 subject to the approval of the President.

== See also ==
- List of acts of the Parliament of India
- List of ordinances of the Indian Government
- Prime Minister of India
- Union Council of Ministers
- Constitution of India
- List of amendments of the Constitution of India
