= Forty-second Amendment of the Constitution of India =

Amendment to the Indian Constitution

The Constitution (Forty-second Amendment) Act, 1976

Parliament of India
- Long title: An Act further to amend the Constitution of India.
- Territorial extent: India
- Passed by: Fifth Lok Sabha
- Passed: 2 November 1976
- Passed by: Rajya Sabha
- Passed: 10 November 1976
- Assented to: 18 December 1976
- Commenced: 3 January 1977

Legislative history

Initiating chamber: Fifth Lok Sabha
- Bill title: The Constitution (Forty-second Amendment) Bill, 1976
- Introduced by: H. R. Gokhale
- Introduced: 1 September 1976

Revising chamber: Rajya Sabha
- Bill title: Constitution (Forty-second Amendment) Bill, 1976
- Received from the Fifth Lok Sabha: 4 November 1976

Summary
- Provides for curtailment of fundamental rights, imposes fundamental duties and changes to the basic structure of the constitution.
- Previous Amendment: 41st in 1976
- Next Amendment: 43rd in 1977

The 42nd amendment to the Constitution of India, officially known as The Constitution (Forty-second amendment) Act, 1976, was enacted during the controversial Emergency period (25 June 1975 – 21 March 1977) by the Indian National Congress government headed by Indira Gandhi.

Most provisions of the amendment came into effect on 3 January 1977, others were enforced from 1 February and Section 27 came into force on 1 April 1977. The 42nd Amendment is regarded as the most controversial constitutional amendment in history. It attempted to reduce the power of the Supreme Court and High Courts to pronounce upon the constitutional validity of laws. It laid down the Fundamental Duties of Indian citizens to the nation. This amendment brought about the most widespread changes to the Constitution in its history. Owing to its size, it is nicknamed the Mini-Constitution.

Many parts of the Constitution, including the Preamble and constitution amending clause itself, were changed by the 42nd Amendment, and some new articles and sections were inserted. The amendment's fifty-nine clauses stripped the Supreme Court of many of its powers and moved the political system toward parliamentary sovereignty. It curtailed democratic rights in the country, and gave sweeping powers to the Prime Minister's Office. The amendment gave Parliament unrestrained power to amend any parts of the Constitution, without judicial review. It transferred more power from the state governments to the central government, eroding India's federal structure. The 42nd Amendment also amended Preamble and changed the description of India from "sovereign, democratic republic" to a "sovereign, socialist, secular, democratic republic", and also changed the words "unity of the nation" to "unity and integrity of the nation".

The Emergency era had been widely unpopular, and the 42nd Amendment was the most controversial issue. The clampdown on civil liberties and widespread abuse of human rights by police angered the public. The Janata Party which had promised to "restore the Constitution to the condition it was in before the Emergency", won the 1977 general elections. The Janata government then brought about the 43rd and 44th Amendments in 1977 and 1978 respectively, to restore the pre-1976 position to some extent. However, the Janata Party was not able to fully achieve its objectives.

On 31 July 1980, in its judgement on Minerva Mills v. Union of India, the Supreme Court declared two provisions of the 42nd Amendment as unconstitutional which prevent any constitutional amendment from being "called in question in any Court on any ground" and accord precedence to the Directive Principles of State Policy over the Fundamental Rights of individuals respectively.

== Proposal and enactment ==
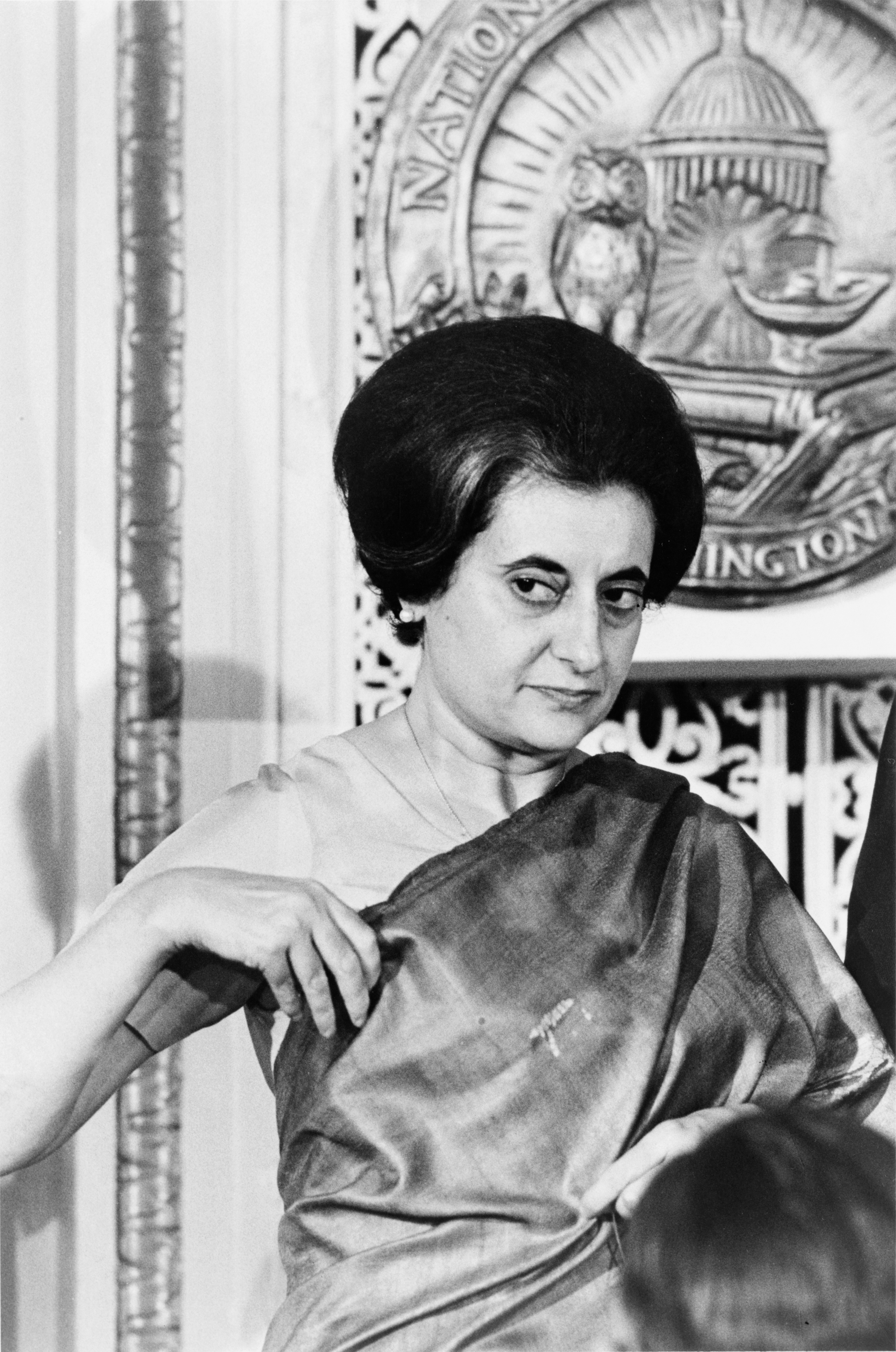
Prime Minister Indira Gandhi, whose Indian National Congress government enacted the 42nd Amendment in 1976, during the Emergency.

Then Prime Minister Indira Gandhi set up a committee in 1976 under the Chairmanship of then Minister of External Affairs Swaran Singh "to study the question of amendment of the Constitution in the light of experience".

The bill for the Constitution (Forty-second Amendment) Act, 1976 was introduced in the Lok Sabha on 1 September 1976, as the Constitution (Forty-Second Amendment) Bill, 1976 (Bill No. 91 of 1976). It was introduced by H. R. Gokhale, then Minister of Law, Justice and Company Affairs. It sought to amend the Preamble and articles 31, 31C, 39, 55, 74, 77, 81, 82, 83, 100, 102, 103, 105, 118, 145, 150, 166, 170, 172, 189, 191, 192, 194, 208, 217, 225, 226, 227, 228, 311, 312, 330, 352, 353, 356, 357, 358, 359, 366, 368 and 371F and the Seventh Schedule. It also sought to substitute articles 103, 150, 192 and 226; and insert new Parts IVA and XIVA and new articles 31D, 32A, 39A, 43A, 48A, 51A, 131A, 139A, 144A, 226A, 228A and 257A in the Constitution. In a speech in the Lok Sabha on 27 October 1976, Gandhi claimed that the amendment "is responsive to the aspirations of the people, and reflects the realities of the present time and the future".

The bill was debated by the Lok Sabha from 25 to 30 October and 1 and 2 November. Clauses 2 to 4, 6 to 16, 18 to 20, 22 to 28, 31 to 33, 35 to 41, 43 to 50 and 56 to 59 were adopted in their original form. The remaining clauses were all amended in the Lok Sabha before being passed. Clause 1 of the bill was adopted by the Lok Sabha on 1 November and amended to replace the name "Forty-fourth" with "Forty-second", and a similar amendment was made on 28 October to Clause 5 which sought to introduce a new article 31D to the Constitution. Amendments to all the other clauses were adopted on 1 November and the bill was passed by the Lok Sabha on 2 November 1976. The bill was passed by the Lok Sabha on 2 November 1976 after a division. The result of the division was: Ayes, 366; Noes, 4. The motion was carried by a majority of the total membership of the House and by a majority of not less than two-thirds of the members present and voting. The Bill, as amended, was therefore passed by the requisite majority in accordance with the provisions of Article 368 of the Constitution. It was then debated by the Rajya Sabha on 4, 5, 8, 9, 10 and 11 November. All amendments made by the Lok Sabha were adopted by the Rajya Sabha on 10 November, and the bill was passed on 11 November 1976. The bill, after ratification by the States, received assent from then President Fakhruddin Ali Ahmed on 18 December 1976, and was notified in The Gazette of India on the same date. Sections 2 to 5, 7 to 17, 20, 28, 29, 30, 33, 36, 43 to 53, 55, 56, 57 and 59 of the 42nd amendment came into force from 3 January 1977. Sections 6, 23 to 26, 37 to 42, 54 and 58 went into effect from 1 February 1977 and Section 27 from 1 April 1977.

=== Ratification ===
The Act was passed in accordance with the provisions of Article 368 of the Constitution, and was being ratified by more than half of the State Legislatures, as required under Clause (2) of the said article. State Legislatures that ratified the amendment are listed below:

- Andhra Pradesh
- Assam
- Bihar
- Haryana
- Himachal Pradesh
- Karnataka
- Madhya Pradesh
- Maharashtra
- Manipur
- Odisha
- Punjab
- Rajasthan
- Sikkim
- Tripura
- Uttar Pradesh
- West Bengal

Did not ratify:

- States:
1. Gujarat
2. Jammu and Kashmir
3. Kerala
4. Tamil Nadu
- Union Territories at that time
1. Meghalaya
2. Nagaland

== Objective ==
The amendment removed election disputes from the purview of the courts. The amendment's opponents described it as a "convenient camouflage".

Second, the amendment transferred more power from the state governments to the central government, eroding India's federal structure. The third purpose of the amendment was to give Parliament unrestrained power to amend any part of the Constitution without judicial review. The fourth purpose was to make any law passed in pursuance of a Directive Principle immune from scrutiny by the Supreme Court. Supporters of the measure said this would "make it difficult for the court to upset parliament's policy in regard to many matters".

== Constitutional changes ==
Almost all parts of the Constitution, including the Preamble and amending clause, were changed by the 42nd Amendment, and some new articles and sections were inserted. Some of these changes are described below.

The Parliament was given unrestrained power to amend any parts of the Constitution, without judicial review. This essentially invalidated the Supreme Court's ruling in Kesavananda Bharati v. State of Kerala in 1973. The amendment to article 368, prevented any constitutional amendment from being "called in question in any Court on any ground". It also declared that there would be no limitation whatever on the constituent power of Parliament to amend the Constitution. The 42nd Amendment also restricted the power of the courts to issue stay orders or injunctions. The 42nd Amendment revoked the courts' power to determine what constituted an office of profit. A new article 228A was inserted in the Constitution which would give High Courts the authority to "determine all questions as to the constitutional validity of any State law". The amendment's fifty-nine clauses stripped the Supreme Court of many of its powers and moved the political system toward parliamentary sovereignty. The 43rd and 44th Amendments reversed these changes.

Article 74 was amended and it was explicitly stipulated that "the President shall act in accordance with the advice of the Council of Ministers". Governors of states were not included in this article. The interval at which a proclamation of Emergency under Article 356 required approval from Parliament was extended from six months to one year. Article 357 was amended so as to ensure that laws made for a State, while it was under Article 356 emergency, would not cease immediately after the expiry of the emergency, but would instead continue to be in effect until the law was changed by the State Legislature. Articles 358 and 359 were amended, to allow suspension of Fundamental Rights, and suspension of enforcement of any of the rights conferred by the Constitution during an Emergency.

The 42nd Amendment added new Directive Principles, viz. Article 39A, Article 43A and Article 48A. The 42nd Amendment gave primacy to the Directive Principles, by stating that "no law implementing any of the Directive Principles could be declared unconstitutional on the grounds that it violated any of the Fundamental Rights". The Amendment simultaneously stated that laws prohibiting "anti-national activities" or the formation of "anti-national associations" could not be invalidated because they infringed on any of the Fundamental Rights. The 43rd and 44th Amendments repealed the 42nd Amendment's provision that Directive Principles take precedence over Fundamental Rights, and also curbed Parliament's power to legislate against "anti-national activities". The 42nd Amendment also added a new section to the Article on "Fundamental Duties" in the Constitution. The new section required citizens "to promote harmony and the spirit of common brotherhood among all the people of India, transcending religious, linguistic and regional or sectional diversities."

The 42nd Amendment granted power to the President, in consultation with the Election Commission, to disqualify members of State Legislatures. Prior to the Amendment, this power was vested in the Governor of the State. Article 105 was amended so as to grant each House of Parliament, its members and committees the right to "evolve" their "powers, privileges and immunities", "from time to time". Article 194 was amended to grant the same rights as Clause 21 to State Legislatures, its members and committees. Two new clauses 4A and 26A were inserted into article 366 of the Constitution, which defined the meaning of the terms "Central Law" and "State Law" by inserting two new clauses 4A and 26A into article 366 of the Constitution.

The 42nd Amendment froze any delimitation of constituencies for elections to Lok Sabha and State Legislative Assemblies until after the 2001 Census of India, by amending article 170 (relating to composition of Legislative Assemblies). The total number of seats in the Lok Sabha and the Assemblies remained the same until the 91st Amendment Bill which was the 84th Amendment to the constitution, passed in 2003, extended the freeze up to 2026. The number of seats reserved for the Scheduled Castes and Scheduled Tribes in the Lok Sabha and State Legislative Assemblies was also frozen. The amendment extended the term of Lok Sabha and Legislative Assemblies members from five to six years, by amending article 172 (relating to MLAs) and Clause(2) of Article 83 (for MPs). The 44th Amendment repealed this change, shortening the term of the aforementioned assemblies back to the original 5 years.

Article 312, which makes the provision for All India Services was amended to include the All-India Judicial Service.

== Amendment of the Preamble ==
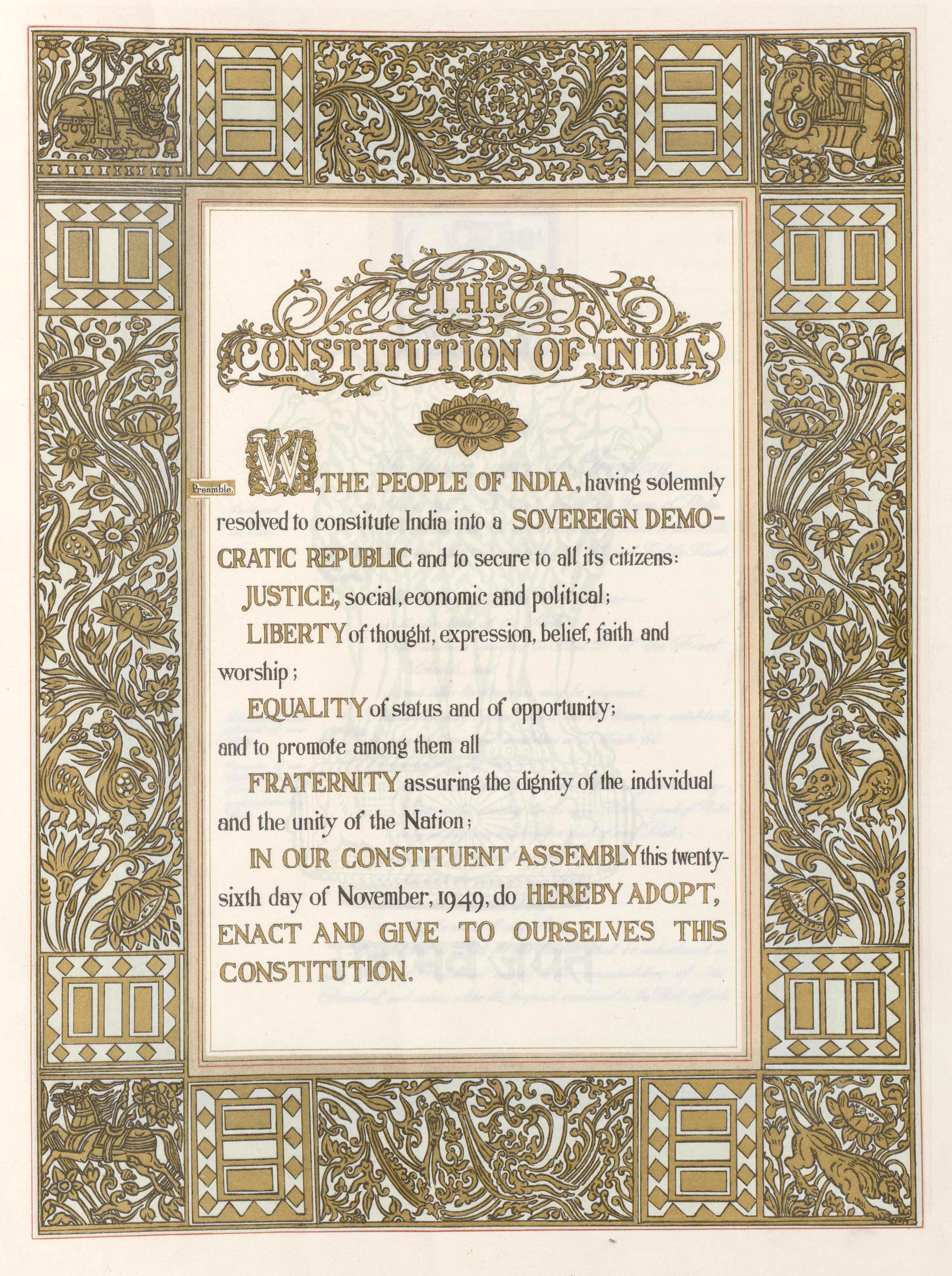
The original text of the Preamble before the 42nd Amendment

The 42nd Amendment changed the description of India from a "sovereign democratic republic" to a "sovereign, socialist secular democratic republic", and also changed the words "unity of the nation" to "unity and integrity of the nation".

B. R. Ambedkar, the principal architect of the Constitution, was opposed to declaring India's social and economic structure in the Constitution. During the Constituent Assembly debates on framing the Constitution in 1946, K.T. Shah proposed an amendment seeking to declare India as a "Secular, Federal, Socialist nation". In his opposition to the amendment, Ambedkar stated, "My objections, stated briefly are two. In the first place the Constitution is merely a mechanism for the purpose of regulating the work of the various organs of the State. It is not a mechanism where by particular members or particular parties are installed in office. What should be the policy of the State, how the Society should be organised in its social and economic side are matters which must be decided by the people themselves according to time and circumstances. It cannot be laid down in the Constitution itself, because that is destroying democracy altogether. If you state in the Constitution that the social organisation of the State shall take a particular form, you are, in my judgment, taking away the liberty of the people to decide what should be the social organisation in which they wish to live. It is perfectly possible today, for the majority people to hold that the socialist organisation of society is better than the capitalist organisation of society. But it would be perfectly possible for thinking people to devise some other form of social organisation which might be better than the socialist organisation of today or of tomorrow. I do not see therefore why the Constitution should tie down the people to live in a particular form and not leave it to the people themselves to decide it for themselves. This is one reason why the amendment should be opposed."

Ambedkar's second objection was that the amendment was "purely superfluous" and "unnecessary", as "socialist principles are already embodied in our Constitution" through Fundamental Rights and the Directive Principles of State Policy. Referring to the Directive Principles, he asked Shah, "If these directive principles to which I have drawn attention are not socialistic in their direction and in their content, I fail to understand what more socialism can be". Shah's amendment failed to pass, and the Preamble remained unchanged until the 42nd Amendment.

== Aftermath ==
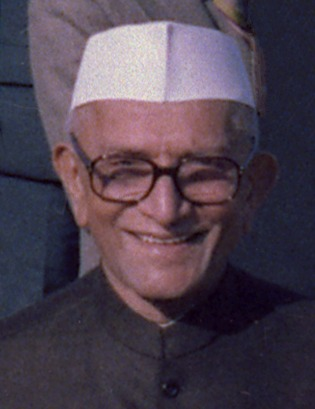
Morarji Desai became Prime Minister after the 1977 elections.

During the Emergency, Indira Gandhi implemented a 20-point program of economic reforms that resulted in greater economic growth, aided by the absence of strikes and trade union conflicts. Encouraged by these positive signs and distorted and biased information from her party supporters, Gandhi called for elections in May 1977. However, the Emergency era had been widely unpopular. The 42nd Amendment was widely criticised, and the clampdown on civil liberties and widespread abuse of human rights by police angered the public.

In its election manifesto for the 1977 elections, the Janata Party promised to "restore the Constitution to the condition it was in before the Emergency and to put rigorous restrictions on the executive's emergency and analogous powers". The election ended the control of the Congress (Congress (R) from 1969) over the executive and legislature for the first time since independence. After winning the elections, the Moraji Desai government attempted to repeal the 42nd Amendment. However, Gandhi's Congress party held 163 seats in the 250 seat Rajya Sabha, and vetoed the government's repeal bill.

The Janata government then brought about the 43rd and 44th Amendments in 1977 and 1978 respectively, to restore the pre-1976 position to some extent. Among other changes, the amendments revoked the 42nd Amendment's provision that Directive Principles take precedence over Fundamental Rights, and also curbed Parliament's power to legislate against "antinational activities". However, the Janata Party was not able to fully achieve its objective of restoring the Constitution to the condition it was in before the Emergency.

== Legal challenges to the amendment ==
The constitutionality of sections 4 and 55 of the 42nd Amendment were challenged in Minerva Mills v. Union of India, when Charan Singh was the caretaker Prime Minister. Section 4 of the 42nd Amendment, had amended Article 31C of the Constitution to accord precedence to the Directive Principles of State Policy articulated in Part IV of the Constitution over the Fundamental Rights of individuals articulated in Part III. Section 55 prevented any constitutional amendment from being "called in question in any Court on any ground". It also declared that there would be no limitation whatever on the power of Parliament to amend the Constitution. After the 1980 Indian general election, the Supreme Court declared sections 4 and 55 of the 42nd amendment as unconstitutional. It further endorsed and evolved the basic structure doctrine of the Constitution. In the judgement on Section 4, Chief Justice Yeshwant Vishnu Chandrachud wrote:

Three Articles of our Constitution, and only three, stand between the heaven of freedom into which Tagore wanted his country to awake and the abyss of unrestrained power. They are Articles 14, 19 and 21. Article 31C has removed two sides of that golden triangle which affords to the people of this country an assurance that the promise held forth by the preamble will be performed by ushering an egalitarian era through the discipline of fundamental rights, that is, without emasculation of the rights to liberty and equality which alone can help preserve the dignity of the individual.

On Section 4, Chandrachud wrote:

"Since the Constitution had conferred a limited amending power on the Parliament, the Parliament cannot under the exercise of that limited power enlarge that very power into an absolute power. Indeed, a limited amending power is one of the basic features of our Constitution and therefore, the limitations on that power can not be destroyed. In other words, Parliament can not, under Article 368, expand its amending power so as to acquire for itself the right to repeal or abrogate the Constitution or to destroy its basic and essential features. The donee of a limited power cannot by the exercise of that power convert the limited power into an unlimited one."

The ruling was widely welcomed in India, and Indira Gandhi did not challenge the verdict. The Supreme Court's position on constitutional amendments laid out in its judgements in Golak Nath v. State of Punjab, Kesavananda Bharati v. State of Kerala and the Minerva Mills case, is that Parliament can amend the Constitution but cannot destroy its "basic structure".

On 8 January 2008, a petition, filed by Sanjiv Agarwal of the NGO Good Governance India Foundation, challenged the validity of Section 2 of the 42nd Amendment, which inserted the word "socialist" in the Preamble to the Constitution. In its first hearing of the case, Chief Justice K. G. Balakrishnan, who headed the three-judge bench, observed, "Why do you take socialism in a narrow sense defined by communists? In broader sense, it means welfare measures for the citizens. It is a facet of democracy. It hasn't got any definite meaning. It gets different meanings in different times." Justice Kapadia stated that no political party had, so far, challenged the amendment and everyone had subscribed to it. The court would consider it only when any political party challenged the Election Commission. The petition was withdrawn on 12 July 2010 after the Supreme Court declared the issue to be "highly academic".

== Legacy ==
In the book JP Movement and the Emergency, historian Bipan Chandra wrote, "Sanjay Gandhi and his cronies like Bansi Lal, Minister of Defence at the time, were keen on postponing elections and prolonging the emergency by several years ... In October–November 1976, an effort was made to change the basic civil libertarian structure of the Indian Constitution through the 42nd amendment to it. ... The most important changes were designed to strengthen the executive at the cost of the judiciary, and thus disturb the carefully crafted system of Constitutional checks and balance between the three organs of the government."

== See also ==
- List of amendments of the Constitution of India
