= Twenty-fifth Amendment of the Constitution of India =

Permits eminent domain

The Constitution (Twenty-fifth Amendment) Act, 1971

Parliament of India
- Long title: An Act further to amend the Constitution of India.
- Citation: 25th Amendment
- Territorial extent: India
- Passed by: Lok Sabha
- Passed: 1 December 1971
- Passed by: Rajya Sabha
- Passed: 8 December 1971
- Assented to: 20 April 1972
- Commenced: 20 April 1972

Legislative history

Initiating chamber: Lok Sabha
- Bill title: The Constitution (Twenty-fifth Amendment) Bill, 1971
- Introduced by: H.R. Gokhale
- Introduced: 28 July 1971
- Committee report: Law Commission of India: Forty-sixth Report on The Constitution (Twenty-fifth Amendment) Bill, 1971

Summary
- Curtailed the right to property, and permitted the acquisition of private property by the government for public use, on the payment of compensation which would be determined by the Parliament and not the courts. Also exempted any law giving effect to the Directive Principles from judicial review, even if it violated the Fundamental Rights.
- Status: Not fully in force

The Twenty-fifth Amendment of the Constitution of India, officially known as The Constitution (Twenty-fifth Amendment) Act, 1971, curtailed the fundamental right to property, and permitted the acquisition of private property by the government for public use, on the payment of compensation which would be determined by the Parliament and not the courts. The amendment also exempted any law giving effect to the article 39(b) and (c) of Directive Principles of State Policy from judicial review, even if it violated the Fundamental Rights.

In 1970, the Supreme Court, in its judgement on Rustom Cavasjee Cooper v. Union of India, filed by R. C. Cooper, popularly known as the Bank Nationalization case, held that the Constitution guarantees the right to compensation, that is, the equivalent money of the property compulsorily acquired. The Court also held that a law which seeks to acquire or requisition property for public purposes must satisfy the requirement of Article19(1)(f). The 25th Amendment sought to overcome the restrictions imposed on the government by this ruling.

Legal expert V.G. Ramachandran described the 24th and 25th Amendments as "not 'tinkering' with the Constitution. It is a veritable slaughter of the Constitution." He stated that the 25th Amendment "smacks of totalitarianism and hurry to achieve socialism instantly overnight".

Section 2(a) and 2(b), and the first part of section 3 of the 25th Amendment were upheld by the Supreme Court in Kesavananda Bharati v. State of Kerala in 1973 as valid. However, the second part of section 3, which prevented judicial review of any law that gives effect to Directive Principles, was declared unconstitutional.

== Text ==
BE it enacted by Parliament in the Twenty-second Year of the Republic of India as follows:—

1. Short title This Act may be called the Constitution (Twenty-fifth Amendment) Act, 1971.

2. Amendment of article 31 In article 31 of the Constitution—

(a) for clause (2), the following clause shall be substituted, namely:—

"(2) No property shall be compulsorily acquired or requisitioned save for a public purpose and save by authority of a law which provides for acquisition or requisitioning of the property for an amount which may be fixed by such law or which may be determined in accordance with such principles and given in such manner as may be specified in such law; and no such law shall be called in question in any court on the ground that the amount so fixed or determined is not adequate or that the whole or any part of such amount is to be given otherwise than in cash:
Provided that in making any law providing for the compulsory acquisition of any property of an educational institution established and administered by a minority, referred to in clause (1) of article 30, the State shall ensure that the amount fixed by or determined under such law for the acquisition of such property is such as would not restrict or abrogate the right guaranteed under that clause";

(b) after clause (2A), the following clause shall be inserted, namely:—

"(2B) Nothing in sub-clause (f) of clause (1) of article 19 shall affect any such law as is referred to in clause (2)".

3. Insertion of new article 31C After article 31B of the Constitution, the following article shall be inserted, namely:—
31C. Saving of laws giving effect to certain directive principle. Notwithstanding anything contained in article 13, no law giving effect to the policy of the State towards securing the principles specified in clause (b) or clause (c) of article 39 shall be deemed to be void on the ground that it is inconsistent with, or takes away or abridges any of the rights conferred by article 14, article 19 or article 31; and no law containing a declaration that it is for giving effect to such policy shall be called in question in any court on the ground that it does not give effect to such policy:

Provided that where such law is made by the Legislature of a State, the provisions of this article shall not apply thereto unless such law, having been reserved for the consideration of the President, has received his assent."

== Background ==
In 1970, the Supreme Court, in its judgement on Rustom Cavasjee Cooper v. Union of India (1970 AIR 564, 1970 SCR (3) 530), popularly known as the Bank Nationalization case, held that the Constitution guarantees the right to compensation, that is, the equivalent money of the property compulsorily acquired. The Court also held that a law which seeks to acquire or requisition property for public purposes must satisfy the requirement of Article19(1)(f). The 25th Amendment sought to overcome the restrictions imposed on the government by the Supreme Court ruling. Article 31, as it stood prior to the Amendment, specially provided that no law providing for the compulsory acquisition or requisitioning of property which either fixes or specifies on which and the manner in which the compensation is to be determined and given, shall be called in question in any court on the ground that the compensation provided by that law is inadequate.

The 24th Amendment had re-established Parliament's authority to amend the Fundamental Rights in the Constitution. This cleared the way for the government to amend article 31, relating to property rights. The 25th Amendment was intended to strip the Supreme Court of the power to go into the quantum of compensation for takeover of property for public use. It would do this by amending and replacing the word "compensation" for the word "amount" for property acquired or requisitioned. The Amendment would also to insert a new clause 31(C) in the Constitution, which would prevent a bill from being challenged in the Court, either under Article 14 (equality before the law), Article 19 (right to property, freedom of association, speech, religion etc.) or Article 31 (on deprivation of law except under authority of law), if Parliament certified that the bill was intended to ensure equitable distribution of material resources or to prevent concentration of economic power.

In an October 1971 report, the Law Commission, headed by former Supreme Court Chief Justice P.B. Gajendragadkar, recommended deletion of the part of article 31C which placed any law containing a declaration that it was for giving effect to certain Directive Principles, outside judicial review. The Commission stated that it would be "unreasonable to prevent any judicial inquiry into the question as to whether laws passed in pursuance of the policy (giving primacy to Directive Principles) bore any connection with the objects intended to be served by it. Parliament should trust the judiciary to do its duty fairly, fearlessly, impartially and objectively and to take cognizance of the changed philosophy which Parliament proposed to adopt in recognising the importance, the urgency and the significance of implementing the Directive Principles in question". However, the report was rejected by the government. The Law Commission's view would later be justified in 1973 by the Supreme Court verdict in Kesavananda Bharati v. State of Kerala, in which the Court held the relevant section of the 25th Amendment as unconstitutional.

== Proposal and enactment ==
The Constitution (Twenty-fifth Amendment) Bill, 1971 (Bill No. 106 of 1971) was introduced in the Lok Sabha on 28 July 1971 by H.R. Gokhale, then Minister of Law and Justice. The Bill sought to amend article 31 and insert a new article 31C in the Constitution. The full text of the Statement of Objects and Reasons appended to the bill is given below:

Article 31 of the Constitution as it stands specifically provides that no law providing for the compulsory acquisition or requisitioning of property which either fixes the amount of compensation or specifies the principles on which and the manner in which the compensation is to be determined and given shall be called in question in any court on the ground that the compensation provided by that law is not adequate. In the Bank Nationalization case [1970, 3 S.C.R. 530), the Supreme Court has held that the Constitution guarantees right to compensation, that is, the equivalent in money of the property compulsorily acquired. Thus in effect the adequacy of compensation and the relevancy of the principles laid down by the Legislature for determining the amount of compensation have virtuality become justiciable inasmuch as the Court can go into the question whether the amount paid to the owner of the property is what may be regarded reasonably as compensation for loss of property. In the same case, the Court has also held that a law which seeks to acquire or requisition property for a public purpose should also satisfy the requirements of article 19 (1) (f).

2. The Bill seeks to surmount the difficulties placed in the way of giving effect to the Directive Principles of State Policy by the aforesaid interpretation. The word "compensation" is sought to be omitted from article 31(2) and replaced by the word "amount". It is being clarified that the said amount may be given otherwise than in cash. It is also proposed to provide that article 19(1)(f) shall not apply to any law relating to the acquisition or requisitioning of property for a public purpose.

3. The Bill further seeks to introduce a new article 31C which provides that if any law is passed to give effect to the Directive Principles contained in clauses (b) and (c) of article 39 and contains a declaration to that effect, such law shall not be deemed to be void on the ground that it takes away or abridges any of the rights contained in article 14, 19 or 31 and shall not be questioned on the ground that it does not give effect to those principles. For this provision to apply in the case of laws made by State Legislatures, it is necessary that the relevant Bill should be reserved for the consideration of the President and receive his assent.

— H.R. Gokhale, "The Constitution (Twenty-fifth Amendment) Bill, 1971". This article incorporates text from this source, which is in the public domain.

The Bill was considered by the Lok Sabha on 30 November and 1 December 1971. Speaking in the Lok Sabha on 30 November, Gokhale commended the Bill, and stated that the intention of new article 31C was to give primacy to Directive Principles and limit property rights in a manner that "vested interests may not be able to take shelter under Fundamental Rights and block progressive legislations". He also stated the judiciary would be confined to the task of legal interpretation of the Constitution, and not be called upon to "sit in judgment over political issues". Gokhale complained that there was a tendency for judges to "import their own political philosophies into their judgements" and "sanctify the right of property". He jibed that this might have been valid in the days of Gladstone, but his own country (the United Kingdom), had no value for it anymore. Gokhale further added, "Parliament should remain the final arbiter in determining what is adequate or can be regarded as reasonable for acquisition under a particular legislation ... Social change should not be blocked by courts by making compulsory the payment of such a quantum of compensation as to make social change impossible." Then Prime Minister Indira Gandhi described the bill as "a small but necessary step towards the fulfillment of the goal of socialism". She claimed that it was not her government or party's intention to weaken the judiciary. She further stated that "the judiciary must not take over the power of Parliament."

The bill was trenchantly criticised by Piloo Mody of the Swatantra Party, who stated that India's secular and democratic Constitution was being converted into an instrument of a "totalitarian oligarchy devoid of the rule of law". Mody criticized the government for the "arbitrary exercise of unmitigated power" and the establishment of a police state. Mody further asked the ruling party whether it had made a sincere effort to bring about social and economic changes, when it had all the opportunity it needed to do so, during the past 25 years of its rule.

The bill was passed by the Lok Sabha (For:353 votes, Against:20), on 1 December 1971. Clause 2 of the Bill sought to amend article 31(2) of the Constitution to clarify that no law providing for the compulsory acquisition or requisitioning of property could be called in question in any Court on the ground that the amount fixed or determined under such law to be given to the owner of the property is not adequate. During the consideration of the clause by the Lok Sabha, Gokhale moved an amendment which sought to add the following proviso at the end of the proposed clause 2 of article 31, "Provided that in making any law providing for the compulsory acquisition of any property of an educational institution established and administered by a minority, referred to in clause (1) of article 30, the State shall ensure that the amount fixed by or determined under such law for the acquisition of such property is such as would not restrict or abrogate the right guaranteed under that clause". This amendment was accepted by the House, and the clause, as amended, was adopted by the Lok Sabha and the Rajya Sabha on 1 and 8 December 1971, respectively. Clauses 1 and 3 of the Bill were adopted, in the original form, by the Lok Sabha and the Rajya Sabha on 1 and 8 December 1971, respectively. The Bill, as passed by the Lok Sabha, was considered by the Rajya Sabha on 7 and 8 December and passed on 8 December 1971.

The bill received assent from then President Varahagiri Venkata Giri on 20 April 1972. It was notified in The Gazette of India, and came into force on the same day.

== Ratification ==
The Act was passed in accordance with the provisions of Article 368 of the Constitution, and was ratified by more than half of the State Legislatures, as required under Clause (2) of the said article. The only states that did not ratify the amendment were Manipur and Rajasthan. State Legislatures that ratified the amendment are listed below:

1. Andhra Pradesh
2. Assam
3. Bihar
4. Gujarat
5. Haryana
6. Himachal Pradesh
7. Jammu and Kashmir
8. Kerala
9. Madhya Pradesh
10. Maharashtra
11. Meghalaya
12. Mysore
13. Nagaland
14. Orissa
15. Punjab
16. Tamil Nadu
17. Tripura
18. Uttar Pradesh
19. West Bengal

== Reception ==
Legal expert V.G. Ramachandran, writing in the Supreme Court Cases Journal (cite: (1971) 2 SCC (Jour) 11) in 1971, stated that the 24th and 25th Amendments were not "tinkering" with the Constitution, but "a veritable slaughter of the Constitution". He felt that the 25th Amendment "smacks of totalitarianism and hurry to achieve socialism instantly overnight". Ramamchandran further stated that the amendments lowered the prestige of the legislature as well as the Judiciary. Supporting the Fundamental Rights, Ramamchandran wrote, "When our founding fathers forged this Constitution they were well aware of the social and economic urges in the country. But they were anxious that the progress must be gradual and stable and not revolutionary. That is why they envisaged the rights to be fundamental in Part III subject to reasonable restrictions in public interest. They further enunciated in Part IV the Directive Principles of State Policy which may be translated into reasonable restrictions of the rights in Part III by law from time as conditions justified them. Changes made overnight during national poverty only increase poverty when there is no corresponding effort at production and increase of wealth. It is equally true that social and economic conditions cannot be improved merely by legislation. It would appear that the people who looked for a Utopia are being fed by a spate of legislation conferring legislative Power. For whose benefit is this? Is it for the political party in power or for the people?"

Ramamchandran argued that making Parliament supreme would not ease the difficulties of the people, and that what really mattered to the common man was how Parliament would protect him in the matter of and safeguarding his Fundamental Rights. He further questioned the Congress government's claim that Parliament had unlimited power to amend the Constitution, asking, "where was this 'Constituent Power' when Article 368 was originally framed? If it did not reside in Parliament then, how can it come in now; if it had that power even then in 1948-50, how was it that Article 368 did not expressly say so?" Ramachandran believed that even if the amendments were upheld by the court, it would not be justifiable to call the present Constitution as amended by the 24th and 25th Amendments as the Constitution of India, and it should instead be called "The Government of India Act, 1971".

== Aftermath ==
The 25th Amendment was part of a series of measures taken by Indira Gandhi to increase her power, and establish one-party rule, beginning with the enactment of the 24th Amendment on 5 November 1971. The 25th Amendment was followed by several constitutional amendments designed to weaken the judiciary, and enhance the authority of Parliament and the Prime Minister's Office. The most notable among these were the 38th and 39th Amendments, culminating in the 42nd Amendment in 1976 during The Emergency, which brought about the most sweeping changes to the Constitution in its history.

=== Kesavananda Bharati case ===
The Supreme Court reviewed its decision in Golaknath v. State of Punjab, in 1971 in Kesavananda Bharati v. State of Kerala, and considered the validity of the 24th, 25th, 26th and 29th Amendments. The case was heard by the largest ever Constitutional Bench of 13 Judges. The Bench gave eleven judgements, which agreed on some points and differed on others. The Court held, by a margin of 7-6, that although no part of the Constitution, including Fundamental Rights, was beyond the amending power of Parliament (thus overruling the 1967 case), the "basic structure of the Constitution could not be abrogated even by a constitutional amendment".

The Court upheld Section 2(a) and 2(b), and the first part of section 3 of the 25th Amendment as valid. However, the second part namely "and no law containing a declaration that it is for giving effect to such policy shall be called in question in any court on the ground that it does not give effect to such policy" was declared unconstitutional.

The government of Indira Gandhi did not take kindly to this implied restriction on its powers by the court. On 26 April 1973, Justice Ajit Nath Ray, who was among the dissenters, was promoted to Chief Justice of India superseding three senior Judges, Shelat, Grover and Hegde, which was unprecedented in Indian legal history. Advocate C.K. Daphtary termed the incident as "the blackest day in the history of democracy". Justice Mohammad Hidayatullah (previous Chief Justice of India) remarked that "this was an attempt of not creating 'forward looking judges' but 'judges looking forward' to the office of Chief Justice".

The government enacted the 42nd Amendment in 1976, to abrogate the Kesavananda Bharati ruling.

== See also ==
- Basic structure doctrine
- List of amendments of the Constitution of India
