= Article 48 of the Constitution of India =

Clause regarding the slaughtering of cows

Article 48A of the Constitution of India is one of the Directive Principles which directs The State shall endeavour to protect and improve the environment and to safeguard the forests and wild life of the country. .

== Directive Principles ==
Article 48 is included as a “Directive Principle of State Policy”, meant to guide the Indian states in policy formation and its implementation, but could not be enforced in any court.

1. All the states administered by the Government of India shall take measures for preserving and improving the breed.
2. The state administration shall make necessary arrangements to re-organize agriculture and animal husbandry on modern and scientific lines.
3. The state shall endeavour to prohibit slaughtering and smuggling of cattle, calves and other milch and draught cattle.
4. The state shall take necessary actions to control trade of cattle in livestock markets for purposes of inhuman slaughter.
5. The State shall endeavor to protect and improve the environment and to safeguard the forests and wildlife of the country.
6. The states shall prevent slaughtering of animals except in recognized and licensed slaughter houses.
7. States shall prohibit the slaughtering of pregnant animals or animals having offspring less than three months old. Further, the animal which is under the age of three months or has not been certified by a veterinarian that it is in a fit condition to be used commercially, shall not be slaughtered in a licensed house.

== Purpose ==
The purpose of the Article 48 of the constitution is aimed at protecting Bos Indicus. In view of the persistent demands requested from the related religions, for action to be taken to prevent cattle slaughtering, the government formulated Article 48 for well-being of cattle and to take measures to secure the cattle wealth of India.

== Petitions filed ==
The article 48 was challenged in the Supreme Court of India by butchers, tanners, gut merchants, curers and cattle dealers. The petitions were filed in accordance with fundamentals rights as mandated in (Article 19(1)(g)) and religion (Article 25) which were violated by enforcing the Article 48.
