= Forty-fourth Amendment of the Constitution of India =

Indian constitutional amendment

The Constitution (Forty-fourth Amendment) Act, 1978

Parliament of India
- Long title: An Act further to amend the Constitution of India.
- Territorial extent: India
- Passed by: Lok Sabha
- Passed: 7 December 1978
- Passed by: Rajya Sabha
- Passed: 31 August 1978
- Assented to: 30 April 1979
- Effective: 30 April 1979

Legislative history

Initiating chamber: Lok Sabha
- Bill title: The Constitution (Forty-fifth Amendment) Bill, 1978
- Bill citation: Bill No. 88 of 1978
- Introduced by: Shanti Bhushan, Minister of Law, Justice and Company Affairs
- Introduced: 15 May 1978

Amends
- Constitution of India
- Status: In force

The Forty-fourth Amendment of the Constitution of India, officially known as the Constitution (Forty-fourth Amendment) Act, 1978, was enacted by the Janata Party which had won the 1977 general elections campaigning on a promise to "restore the Constitution to the condition it was in before the [1975-1977] Emergency". The Amendment aimed to undo several changes that had been made to the Constitution by the 42nd Amendment which had been enacted by the Indira Gandhi-led Indian National Congress during the Emergency.

== Legislative history ==
The bill of the Constitution (Forty-fourth Amendment) Act, 1978 was introduced in the Lok Sabha on 16 December 1977 as the Constitution (Forty-fourth Amendment) Bill, 1977. It was introduced by Shanti Bhushan, Minister of Law, Justice and Company Affairs. The bill sought to amend articles 19, 22, 30, 31A, 31C, 38, 74, 77, 83, 105, 123, 132, 133, 134, 139A, 150, 166, 172, 194, 213, 217, 225, 226, 227, 239B, 329, 352, 356, 358, 359, 360, 366, 368 and 371F and the Seventh and Ninth Schedules to the Constitution; substitute new articles for articles 71, 103 and 192; insert new articles 134A, 361A and Chapter IV in Part XIII of the Constitution; and omit articles 31, 257A and 329A and Part XIVA of the Constitution. The Bill also sought repeal sections 18, 19, 21, 22, 31, 32, 34, 35, 58 and 59 of the 42nd Amendment Act.

The bill was debated by the Lok Sabha on 7, 8, 9, 10, 11, 12, 21, 22 and 23 August 1978. Clauses 1, 15 and 26 of the Bill were adopted by the Lok Sabha on 22 August with formal amendments to replace the word "Forty-fifth" with the word "Forty-fourth". Clauses 2 to 14, 16 to 20, 23 to 25, 27 to 40 and 42 to 49 were adopted in their original form. Clause 21, 22, and 41 of the bill were adopted by the House with amendments. The Bill was passed by the Lok Sabha on 23 August.

The Bill, as passed by the Lok Sabha, was considered by the Rajya Sabha on 28, 29, 30 and 31 August. Clauses 1, 15 and 26 of the Bill were adopted by the Rajya Sabha on 31 August. However, the House rejected some clauses of the Bill. The motion to adopt clauses 8, 44 and 45 which would have amended articles 31C, 366 and 368 respectively failed to secure the required supermajority. Clause 35 of the Bill which sought to omit Part XIV-A of the Constitution also did not receive support. The Bill was passed by the Rajya Sabha with amendments on 31 August.

The Bill, as amended by the Rajya Sabha, was considered by the Lok Sabha on 6 and 7 December. The House accepted the amendement made by the Rajya Sabha and the bill passed by the Lok Saba on 7 December 1978. The bill, after ratification by the states, received assent from President Neelam Sanjiva Reddy and was notified in The Gazette of India on 30 April 1979. Sections 2, 4 to 16, 22, 23, 25 to 29, 31 to 42, 44 and 45 came into force on the same date, Sections 17 to 21 and 30 came into force on 1 August 1979, and Sections 24 and 43 came into force on 6 September 1979.

=== Ratification ===
The Act was passed in accordance with the provisions of Article 368 of the Constitution, and was ratified by more than half of the State Legislatures, as required under Clause (2) of the said article. State Legislatures that ratified the amendment are listed below:

1. Andhra Pradesh
2. Assam
3. Bihar
4. Gujarat
5. Haryana
6. Himachal Pradesh
7. Madhya Pradesh
8. Maharashtra
9. Manipur
10. Meghalaya
11. Nagaland
12. Orissa
13. Punjab
14. Rajasthan
15. Sikkim
16. Tamil Nadu
17. West Bengal

Did not ratify:

1. Karnataka
2. Jammu and Kashmir
3. Kerala
4. Uttar Pradesh
5. Tripura
