= List of landmark court decisions in India =

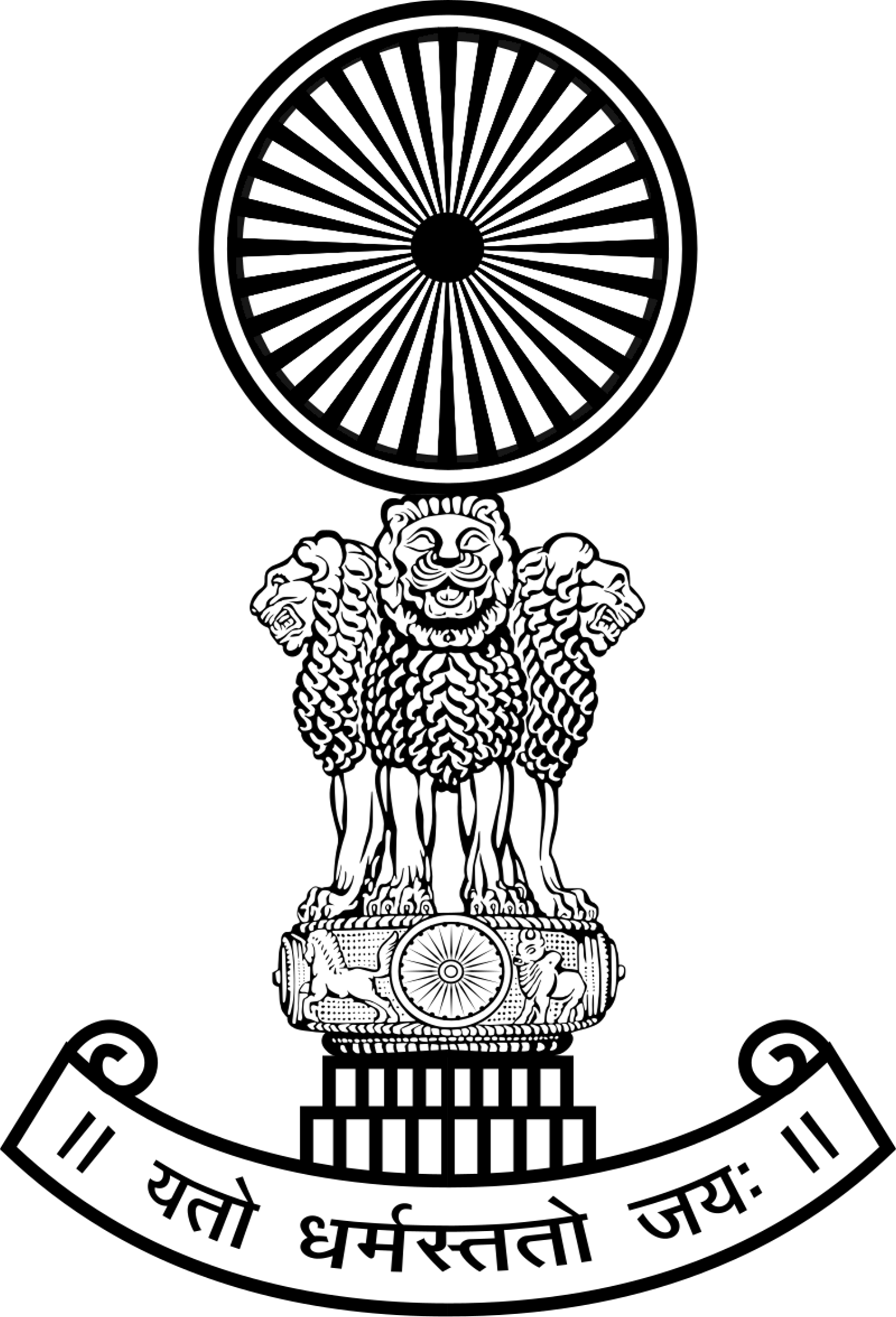
Emblem of the Supreme Court of India, India's highest judiciary authority.

Landmark court decisions in India substantially change the interpretation of existing law. Such a landmark decision may settle the law in more than one way. In present-day common law legal systems it may do so by:

- Establishing a significant new legal principle or concept;
- Overturning prior precedent based on its negative effects or flaws in its reasoning;
- Distinguishing a new principle that refines a prior principle, thus departing from prior practice without violating the rule of stare decisis;
- Establishing a "test" (that is, a measurable standard that can be applied by courts in future decisions).

In India, landmark court decisions come most frequently from the Supreme Court of India, which is the highest judicial body in India. High courts of India may also make such decisions, particularly if the Supreme Court chooses not to review the case or if it adopts the holding of the lower court.

== Individual rights ==
Name of the case	Year	Judgement
Romesh Thappar vs State of Madras	1950	Ban on dissenting media under the Section 9 (1-A) of the Madras Maintenance of Public Order Act, 1949 struck down as unconstitutional.
Romesh Thappar vs State of Madras	1950	This in-turn led to formulation of the 1st amendment of the Constitution of India which clarified public order can form grounds for reasonable restrictions of free speech.
State of Madras v. VG Row	1952	Restrictions on fundamental rights must be just, fair, and reasonable, and arbitrary infringement of rights is subject to judicial review.
Rustom Cavasjee Cooper v. Union Of India (Bank Nationalization Case)	1970	The Supreme Court held that the Banking Companies (Acquisition and Transfer of Undertakings) Act, 1969, was unconstitutional and void because it failed to provide just and adequate compensation and was discriminatory.
Kesavananda Bharati v. State of Kerala	1973	Fundamental rights cannot be abrogated by Parliament.
Stanislaus v. State of Madhya Pradesh	1977	Right to propagate religion does not include the right to convert by force, fraud or allurement.
Hussainara Khatoon vs Home Secretary, State Of Bihar	1979	Right to life under Article 21 includes the right to a speedy trial.
Mohd. Ahmed Khan v. Shah Bano Begum	1985	Upheld the payment of maintenance and alimony to Shah Bano and hence to Muslim women by Muslim Husbands.
Mohd. Ahmed Khan v. Shah Bano Begum	1985	The Rajiv Gandhi ministry passed the Muslim Women (Protection of Rights on Divorce) Act, 1986 which diluted this judgement and restricted the right to maintenance and alimony which was heavily criticized as a move to appease Muslims opposing the judgement. The Supreme court later through Danial Latifi v. Union of India case and Shamima Farooqui v. Shahid Khan upheld the Shah Bano judgement effectively nullifying the Muslim Women Act, 1986.
Bijoe Emmanuel v. State of Kerala	1986	Compelling students to sing the national anthem against their religious beliefs violates Article 25(1) of the Constitution, which grants the freedom of conscience and the right freely to profess, practice and propagate religion. The freedom of speech and expression under Article 19(1)(a) also includes the right to remain silent.
Sodan Singh v New Delhi Municipal Committee & Another	1989	Street trading is an age-old vocation and cannot be denied by the government as a matter of right on the pavements and roads of the city of Delhi, claiming that the streets are meant exclusively for passing or repassing and no other use. Only reasonable restrictions could be imposed under Article 19(6). What would constitute a reasonable restriction must be judged objectively on the basis of facts and circumstances in each case. All public streets and roads in India vest in the state, but the state holds them as trustee on behalf of the public.
Charan Lal Sahu v Union of India	1989	The constitutional validity of the Bhopal Gas Leak Disaster (Processing of Claims) Act, 1985, was challenged in this case on the grounds that it deprived the claimant of his right to seek legal remedies against the Union Carbide Company. The court held that as parents partiae, the state was justified in assuming the role of guardian for the victims.
National Legal Services Authority v. Union of India	2014	Recognised transgender as 'third gender' in law and affirmed that the fundamental rights granted under the Constitution of India will be equally applicable to them.
ABC v. The State (NCT of Delhi)	2015	Unwed woman belonging to the Christian faith can become a legal guardian of her child without the father's consent.
Shreya Singhal v. Union of India	2015	Struck down restrictions on online speech introduced in Section 66A of the Information Technology Act, 2000.
Justice K. S. Puttaswamy v. Union of India or The Right to Privacy verdict	2017	Right to privacy is protected as a fundamental right under Articles 14, 19 and 21 of the Constitution of India thus overruling ADM Jabalpur vs Shivkant Shukla.
Justice K. S. Puttaswamy v. Union of India or The Right to Privacy verdict	2017	This judgement thus overruled the ADM Jabalpur v. Shivkant Shukla (1976): A person's right to not be unlawfully detained (i.e. habeas corpus) can be suspended during emergency.
Navtej Singh Johar v. Union of India	2018	Decriminalisation of acts of Oral sex and Anal sex which effectively decriminalised Homosexual sex.
Navtej Singh Johar v. Union of India	2018	This judgement thus overruled Suresh Kumar Koushal v. Naz Foundation (2013): Upheld and reinstated the Section 377 of the Indian Penal Code criminalising Anal sex
Navtej Singh Johar v. Union of India	2018	This judgement thus overruled Naz Foundation v. Govt. of NCT of Delhi (2009): Decriminalization of homosexual acts involving consenting adults throughout India.
Arun Kumar v. Inspector General of Registration	2019	The Madras High Court (Madurai Bench) directed the Tamil Nadu state to ban forced sex-selective surgeries on intersex infants,. the high court of Tamil Nadu, ruled that the term "bride" under the Hindu Marriage Act, 1955 includes trans women. Specifically, it directed the authorities to register a marriage between a man and a transgender woman.
Deepika Singh v. Central Administrative Tribunal	2022	Atypical families and same-sex couples are deserving of equal protection under law and benefits available under social welfare legislation.
Janhit Abhiyan v. Union of India or EWS Reservation Case.	2022	The legality of the 103rd Amendment of the Constitution, which provides reservation in educational institutes as well as in jobs for the economically weaker sections, was upheld.
Supriyo v. Union of India	2023	The right to marry is a statutory right, not a constitutional right. Therefore, only Parliament can recognize the marriage between non-heterosexual couples.

== Criminal law ==
Name of the case	Year	Judgement
Maneka Gandhi v. Union of India	1978	A 'procedure' under Article 21 of the Constitution cannot be arbitrary, unfair, oppressive, or unreasonable. A law depriving a person of 'personal liberty' must not violate any of the Articles 14, 19, and 21 of the Constitution.
Maneka Gandhi v. Union of India	1978	This judgement thus overruled A. K. Gopalan v. State of Madras (1950) Court upheld the validity of the Preventive Detention Act, 1950, with the exception of Section 14, which restricted disclosure of the grounds of detention, which was deemed unconstitutional.
Vishakha v. State of Rajasthan	1997	Establishment of the Vishakha Guidelines to handle sexual harassments of women at workplace until sufficient legislation is implemented for the purpose.
Vishakha v. State of Rajasthan	1997	This ruling was superseded by the Sexual Harassment of Women at Workplace Act, 2013
Om Prakash v. State of Uttar Pradesh	2006	A person is not convictable under Section 376 2e (Raping a pregnant women) if he had certain knowledge of the fact that the victim is pregnant. The knowledge of the fact must be proven to certainty and not possibility. Consequently, in this case, the accused was sentenced under Section 376 (1), and was sentenced to milder punishment.
Arnesh Kumar vs State of Bihar or The Arnesh Kumar Guidelines	2014	Arrests should be an exception, in cases where the punishment is less than seven years of imprisonment.

== Constitutional jurisprudence ==
The Supreme Court of India, which is the highest judicial body in India, has decided many leading cases of Constitutional jurisprudence, establishing Constitution Benches for hearing the same. Given below are a list of some leading cases.

Name of case	Year	Judgement
A. K. Gopalan v. State of Madras	1950	Article 21 of the Constitution of India did not require Indian courts to apply the due process of law standard (the specific words used in Article 21 are 'procedure established by law'). Article 19 (fundamental freedoms) and Article 21 (right to life) operate in independent silos; meaning a law could abridge personal liberty of a person as long as the procedure is followed, without any regard to whether the procedure itself is just or fair.
State of Madras v. Champakam Dorairajan	1951	Struck down the Communal G.O. of 1927 by the Madras government rejecting caste-based reservations in government jobs and college seats.
State of Madras v. Champakam Dorairajan	1951	This in-turn led to formulation of the 1st Amendment of the Constitution which clarified that right to equality does not bar the enactment of laws which provide "special consideration" for weaker sections of society.
Bengal Immunity Company v. State of Bihar	1955	A state cannot tax inter-state sales, unless expressly authorized by the Parliament to do so under Article 286(2) of the Constitution.
In Re: Berubari Union and Exchange of Enclaves	1960	Preamble was not part of the Constitution and therefore could not be regarded as a source of any substantive power. However, this view was later reversed in Kesavananda Bharati v. State of Kerala, where the Supreme Court held that constitutional interpretation should be undertaken in light of the vision laid down in the Preamble.
Rajasthan State Electricity Board v. Mohan Lal	1967	The expression 'other authorities' under Article 12 of the Constitution was wide enough to include all authorities of the state; it was not necessary that they perform a governmental or sovereign function.
Golaknath v. State Of Punjab	1967	Struck down Parliament's power to amend all parts of the Constitution, including Part III related to Fundamental Rights. The judgement left Parliament with no power to curtail Fundamental Rights.
Kesavananda Bharati v. State of Kerala	1973	Formally outlined and adopted the Basic structure doctrine, limiting Parliament's power to amend the Constitution by holding that certain fundamental features of the Constitution cannot be altered.
Indira Nehru Gandhi v. Raj Narain	1975	Examined the validity of the 39th Amendment to the Constitution of India and struck down clauses (4) and (5) of Article 329A, reinforcing the basic structure doctrine and reaffirming that no one, not even the Prime Minister, is above the law and that the judiciary has the ultimate authority to interpret the Constitution and safeguard its fundamental principles.
Indira Nehru Gandhi v. Raj Narain	1975	The judgement overturned the Allahabad High Court decision in State of Uttar Pradesh v. Raj Narain, allowing Indira Gandhi to continue serving as the Prime Minister of India.
Minerva Mills v. Union of India	1980	Clarifying the Basic Structure doctrine, the Court ruled that the power of the parliament to amend the constitution is limited by the constitution. Hence the parliament cannot exercise this limited power to grant itself an unlimited power, rendering clauses 4 and 5 of the 42nd Amendment of the Constitution (1976) void.
Olga Tellis Vs. BMC	1985	The right to life under Article 21 of the Constitution of India includes the right to livelihood.
Mohini Jain v. State of Karnataka	1992	Established right to education as an integral part of the right to life guaranteed under Article 21.
Indra Sawhney & Others v. Union of India	1992	Upheld that caste was an acceptable indicator of backwardness.
S. R. Bommai v. Union of India	1994	Court discussed at length provisions of Article 356 of the Constitution of India (President's Rule) and related issues. This helped put an end to the arbitrary impositions seen until then.
Sarla Mudgal, & others. v. Union of India	1995	Principles against the practice of solemnizing second marriage by conversion to Islam, with first marriage not being dissolved. It highlighted the need for a uniform civil code.
Three Judges Cases	1981	S.P. Gupta v. Union of India Established the Collegium system of the Indian Judicial System.
Three Judges Cases	1993	Supreme Court Advocates-on-Record Association v. Union of India Struck down the 99th Amendment of the Constitution of India and the proposal of the National Judicial Appointments Commission.
Three Judges Cases	1998	In re Special reference 1 Reply by the Chief Justice of India to the questions raised by President of India K. R. Narayanan regarding the Collegium system.
Mohammad Salimullah v. Union of India	2021	Rejected appeals to provide relief to illegal Rohingya immigrants from deportation.
Association for Democratic Reforms vs Union of India & Ors.	2024	Struck down the Union's 2018 Electoral Bonds scheme. The Court held that the scheme violated the voters’ right to information enshrined in Article 19(1)(a) of the Constitution, and that the scheme could lead to Quid pro quo situations.
Sita Soren v. Union of India	2024	The Member of Parliament and Members of Legislative Assemblies of the States did not have immunity from bribery under the privileges granted legislators under the Constitution.

== Policy and Administration ==
Name of the case	Year	Judgement
T. S. R. Subramanian v. Union of India	2013	Officers of the IAS, other All India Services and other civil servants are not bound to follow oral directives, as they "undermine credibility".
Lily Thomas v. Union of India along with Lok Prahari v. Union of India	2013	MP, MLA/MLC who is convicted of a crime and given a minimum of two years', loses membership of the House with immediate effect.
Government of NCT of Delhi v. Union of India	2018	Chief Minister, and not the Lieutenant Governor of Delhi, is the executive head of the National Capital Territory (NCT) government.
Government of NCT of Delhi v. Union of India	2018	This overruled the Government of NCT of Delhi v. Union of India in the Delhi High Court (2016) : The Lt Governor of Delhi exercised complete control of all matters regarding National Capital Territory of Delhi.

== Law enforcement ==
Name of the case	Year	Judgement
Prakash Singh v. Union of India	2006	Police reforms in India: Fixed tenure of State Police Chief / Director General of Police (DGP); Separation of law and order and crime investigation at the police station level; Establishment of Police Complaint Authorities; Constitute a State Security Commission; to prevent political interference on the police and evaluation of police performance.; Creation of Police Establishment Board; Minimum fixed tenure for police officers in operational law and order positions, including Station House Officers, District Superintendents of Police, Commissioners of Police and Zonal Inspectors General.; Creation of National Security Commission at the union level.
Vineet Narain v. Union of India	1997–1998	Strengthened independence of CBI and Enforcement Directorate; abolished Single Directive and introduced judicially monitored investigation guidelines.
Lalita Kumari v. Government of Uttar Pradesh	2013	Held that registration of FIR is mandatory under Section 154 CrPC if information discloses a cognizable offence; preliminary inquiry only in exceptional cases.
D. K. Basu v. State of West Bengal	1997	Issued binding guidelines to prevent custodial torture & deaths including arrest memo, information to relatives, medical examination, and production before magistrate.
Joginder Kumar v. State of Uttar Pradesh	1994	Held that police power of arrest is not absolute and reasons for arrest must be justified; protection against arbitrary arrest.
Nandini Satpathy v. P. L. Dani	1978	Expanded protection against self-incrimination during police interrogation; recognised right to silence and right to consult lawyer during questioning.
State of Bihar v. P. P. Sharma	1991	Reaffirmed wide powers of police to investigate; courts should not quash FIR/investigation merely on allegations of mala fides without strong evidence.

== Environmental law ==
Name of the case	Year	Judgement
Municipal Corporation, Ratlam v. Shri Vardhichand & Others	1980	The Code of Criminal Procedure, 1973 empowers the Magistrate to direct the Municipal Corporation to remove public nuisance caused by pollutants.
M. C. Mehta v. Union of India	1987	Introduced absolute liability principle for hazardous industries, replacing English strict liability rule, and established that compensation must correlate with industry's capacity.
M. C. Mehta v. Union of India & Ors.	1996	The court ordered creation of Taj Trapezium Zone to protect Taj Mahal from pollution—applying precautionary principle and the polluter pays principle for protection of cultural heritage setting precedent for future rulings on environmental issues.
M. C. Mehta v. Kamal Nath	1996	Established public trust doctrine in Indian law, holding that natural resources like rivers are held in trust by government for public use and cannot be exploited for private gain.
Church of God (Full Gospel) v. KKR Majestic Colony Welfare Association	2000	Approved a ban on loudspeakers or noise in the name of religion, noting that the freedom of religion under Articles 25 and 26, is not absolute, and could be subjected to reasonable restrictions, particularly for the peaceful enjoyment of rights by others.

== Press freedom ==
Name of case	Year	Judgement
Express Newspapers v Union of India	1958	Liberty of the press is an essential part of the freedom of speech and expression guaranteed under Article 19(1)(a).
Sakal Papers Ltd. v. Union of India	1962	The Daily Newspapers (Price and Control) Order, 1962, issued under Section 3(1) of the Newspapers (Price and Page) Act, 1956, which regulated the price and the number of pages a newspaper could publish to be unconstitutional.
Bennett Coleman & Co. v. Union of India	1972	The machinery of import control cannot be utilized by the government to control or curb circulation or growth or freedom of newspapers in India.
Tata Press Ltd. v. Mahanagar Telephone Nigam Limited	1995	Commercial speech is part of the fundamental right to freedom of speech and expression guaranteed by the Constitution.

== Established new tests and regulations ==
Name of the case	Year	Judgement
RG Anand v. Deluxe Films	1978	Copyright protection does not extend to mere ideas. Where theme is same but presented differently, there can be no question of infringement.
Ajay Hasia v. Khalid Mujib	1981	Laid down a test to determine whether an individual, corporation, or society was an instrumentality or agency of the government.
Satyam Infoway Ltd. v. Sifynet Solutions Pvt. Ltd.	2004	The Indian Trade Marks Act, 1999 is applicable to the regulation of domain names.
Swasthya Adhikar Manch v. Union of India	2013	Laid down the regulations regarding Clinical trials held by Contract research organizations to protect participants.

== Controversial judgments ==
Name of the case	Year	Judgement
P. V. Narasimha Rao v State (JMM Bribery Case)	1998	The Member of Parliament who took bribes to cast their votes to defeat a motion of no confidence in the Parliament could not be prosecuted, as the Constitution granted them immunity from any proceedings in any court in respect of anything said or vote given by him in the Parliament under Article 105(2). The most controversial part of the judgment was the resulting paradox: if a Parliamentarian took bribe to vote, they were protected. However, if they took the bribe, and did not vote, then they could be prosecuted as the protection applies only in respect of anything said or vote given. This case was overruled in 2024 by a 7-judge constitutional bench of the Supreme Court of India in Sita Soren v. Union of India.
Mohd. Hanif Quareshi & Others v State of Bihar	1958	A constitutional bench of the Supreme Court held that the Indian state was allowed to ban cow slaughter and could violate fundamental rights in order to enforce the Directive Principles of State Policy. The Court upheld the ban on cow and calf slaughter, while deeming the unconditional ban on the slaughter of she-buffalows, breeding bulls, and working bullocks to be an unreasonable restriction.
Additions District Magistrate, Jabalpur v. Shivkant Shukla	1976	By a 4:1 majority, the Supreme Court of India held that during a Presidential proclamation of Emergency, no person could approach courts to challenge unlawful detention, effectively nullifying the right to life. Justice Hans Raj Khanna was the sole dissenting judge in the case. The case is widely recognized to be one of the worst judgments in Indian judicial history. The judgment was overruled in 2017 in Puttaswamy v. Union of India.
Uday v State of Karnataka	2003	Consensual sex with a woman based on a false promise of marriage is rape. A similar judgment was pronounced by the Supreme Court of India in 2019.

== See also ==
- Judiciary of India
