= M. C. Mehta v. Union of India =

Shriram Gas Leak Case of 1987

- Court: Supreme Court of India
- Full case name: M.C. Mehta v. Union of India (UOI) and Ors.
- Decided: 20 December 1986
- Citation: 1987 SCR (1) 819; AIR 1987 965

Court membership
- Judges sitting: P.N. Bhagwati (Chief Justice), G.L. Misra Rangnath Oza, M.M. Dutt, K.N. Singh

Case opinions
- Decision by: P.N. Bhagwati

M.C. Mehta v. Union of India (1987), also known as Oleum Gas Leak Case, is a landmark case of environmental jurisprudence in India, known for establishing the principle of absolute liability and the concept of deep pockets.

The case originated in the aftermath of oleum gas leak from a factory owned by Shriram Food and Fertilisers Industries in Delhi, resulting in death of one person and hospitalisation of several others. This gas leak, occurring soon after the infamous Bhopal gas leak of 1984, created a lot of panic and raised concerns about lack of regulatory oversight. The Supreme Court of India, taking cognizance of the matter under Article 32 of the Constitution of India, heard the petition filed by M. C. Mehta, a prominent environmental lawyer and activist seeking to hold the company liable and establish stricter environmental safeguards.

The foundational principles established in this case have been incorporated into various environmental regulations and statutes, including the Environment Protection Act, 1986. The principle of absolute liability has also influenced the development of the doctrine of "polluter pays," further established in M. C. Mehta v. Union of India & Ors. in 1996.

== Preliminary objection of the defendants ==
There was only one preliminary objection filed by the counsel for the defendant, and this was that the Court should not proceed to decide these constitutional issues since there was no claim for compensation originally made in the writ petition and these issues could not be said to arise in the writ petition. However, the Court, while rejecting this objection, said that though it is undoubtedly true that the petitioner could have applied for amendment of the writ petition to include a compensation claim but merely because he did not do so, the applications for compensation cannot be thrown out. These applications for compensation are for enforcement of the fundamental right to life enshrined in Article 21 of the Constitution and while dealing with such applications we cannot adopt a hyper-technical approach that would defeat the ends of justice.

== Order of the court ==
The Supreme Court made the following observation:

Since we are not deciding the question as to whether Shriram is an authority within the meaning of Article 12 to be subjected to the discipline of the fundamental right under Article 21, we do not think it would be justified in setting up a special machinery for investigation of the claims for compensation made by those who allege that they have been the victims of oleum gas escape. But we would direct that Delhi Legal Aid and Advice Board to take up the cases of all those who claim to have suffered on account of oleum gas and to file actions on their behalf in the appropriate court for claiming compensation against Shriram. Such actions claiming compensation may be filed by the Delhi Legal Aid and Advice Board within two months from today and the Delhi Administration is directed to provide the necessary funds to the Delhi Legal Aid and Advice Board for the purpose of filing and prosecuting such actions.

Thus the High Court was directed to nominate one or more Judges as may be necessary for the purpose of trying such actions so that they may be expeditiously disposed of. Simply because the gas caused death and many people were hospitalized.
