= Indira Gandhi v. Raj Narain =

1975 election and constitutional law case

- Court: Supreme Court of India
- Full case name: Indira Nehru Gandhi vs Shri Raj Narain & Anr.
- Decided: November 7, 1975
- Verdict: Struck down clauses (4) and (5) of Article 329A; Overturned lower court conviction of Indira Gandhi
- Citations: AIR 1975 SUPREME COURT 2299, 1976 2 SCR 347

Court membership
- Judges sitting: A. N. Ray (Chief Justice), H. R. Khanna, K. K. Mathew, M. H. Beg, and Y. V. Chandrachud

Case opinions
- Decision by: Justice A. N. Ray

Laws applied
- Article 14, 31-B, 368, and 329-A of the Constitution of India, and Section 123(7) of the Representation of People's Act, 1951; Basic structure doctrine, Separation of powers
- This case overturned a previous ruling
- State of Uttar Pradesh v. Raj Narain

Keywords
- Constitutional law, The Emergency (India)

Indira Nehru Gandhi v. Shri Raj Narain & Anr. (AIR 1975 SC 2299), also known as the Election Case, is a landmark case in Indian constitutional law examining the validity of the 39th Amendment to the Constitution of India, validity of Article 329A, and the allegations of electoral malpractice against Indira Gandhi. The case was decided by the Supreme Court of India which ruled that clauses (4) and (5) of Article 329A were unconstitutional and therefore void because it violated the basic structure of the Indian constitution. The court simultaneously overturned the decision of the lower court, which found Gandhi's election to be invalid, and allowed her to continue serving as the Prime Minister of India.

The judgement is noted for reaffirming the basic structure doctrine for the Indian Constitution enshrined in Kesavananda Bharati v. State of Kerala. The case further underscored the principle of judicial review.

== Background ==
The 39th Amendment to the Constitution of India was enacted on 10th August, 1975, shortly after the imposition of the state of emergency by Indira Gandhi. The amendment was motivated by the rulings in State of Uttar Pradesh v. Raj Narain which challenged the election of the Prime Minister based on the grounds of electoral malpractices. Indira Gandhi was found guilty by the Allahabad High Court and her election was invalidated; resulting in possible loss of her position as the Prime Minister of India. While the ruling was appealed and stayed and later overturned, it was not rejected by the Supreme Court outright, creating interim political crisis for the Indira Gandhi's government. The amendment, introduced after partial stay order, amended Articles 71 and 329 of the Indian Constitution and introduced new Article 329A with six clauses. The amendment fundamentally sought to assert parliamentary supremacy over the judiciary. Further, the amendments was introduced when many opposition leaders were jailed on the pretext of the emergency. These changes placed the election of the President, the Vice President, the Prime Minister and the Speaker of the Lok Sabha beyond judicial review; effectively nullifying ongoing process and retroactively validated her void election.

== Case summary ==
The Supreme Court considered two civil appeals together. The first appeal, Civil Appeal No. 887 of 1975, was filed by Indira Gandhi against her conviction and the respondent was Raj Narain. While the case was being considered, the 39th Amendment to the Constitution of India was passed, stripping Supreme Court of its authority over the case. Its validity was challenged in cross-objections raised by Raj Narain in the second appeal, Civil Appeal No. 909 of 1975.

Based on both appeals, the court considered three main issues:

- Whether the election of Indira Gandhi was valid
- Whether the Representation of People's (Amendment) Act, 1974, and the Election Laws (Amendment) Act, 1975, are constitutionally valid
- Whether clause (4) of Article 329A is unconstitutional

== Judgement ==
In a landmark judgement, a division bench constiting of justices A. N. Ray (Chief Justice), H. R. Khanna, K. K. Mathew, M. H. Beg, and Y. V. Chandrachud struck down Clause (4) of Article 329A as unconstitutional. The Court held that this provision violated the "basic structure" of the Constitution deriving from precedent established in Kesavananda Bharati v. State of Kerala. The justices reasoned that free and fair elections, the separation of powers, and judicial review were essential features of the Indian Constitution and could not be abrogated by a constitutional amendment. However, the court recognized the limits of judicial scrutiny into parliamentary proceedings per Article 122 of the Constitution and validated the constitutionality of the Representation of the People (Amendment) Act, 1974, and the Election Laws (Amendment) Act, 1975, notwithstanding procedural points raised in the appeal. The court also found not wrongdoing of electoral malpractice against Indira Gandhi and upheld her election as a prime minister.

== Significance ==
While the Supreme Court overturned Indira Gandhi's conviction, its striking down of a key part of the 39th Amendment was a monumental moment in Indian constitutional history. It reaffirmed the principle that no one, not even the Prime Minister, is above the law and that the judiciary has the ultimate authority to interpret the Constitution and safeguard its fundamental principles.

== See also ==
- List of landmark court decisions in India
- Kesavananda Bharati v. State of Kerala
