= Environmental policy of India =

Environment policies of the Government of India include legislations related to environment.

In the Directive Principles of State Policy, Article 48A says "the state shall endeavour to protect and improve the environment and to safeguard the forests and wildlife of the country"; Article 51-A states that "it shall be the duty of every citizen of India to protect and improve the natural environment including forests, lakes, rivers and wildlife and to have compassion for living creatures."

India is one of the parties of the Convention on Biological Diversity (CBD) treaty. Prior to the CBD, India had different laws to govern the environment. The Indian Wildlife Protection Act 1972 protected the biodiversity. It was amended later multiple times. The 1988 National Forest Policy had conservation as its fundamental principle. In addition to these acts, the government passed the Environment (Protection) Act 1986 and Foreign Trade (Development and Regulation) Act 1992 for control of biodiversity.

== Statutes ==
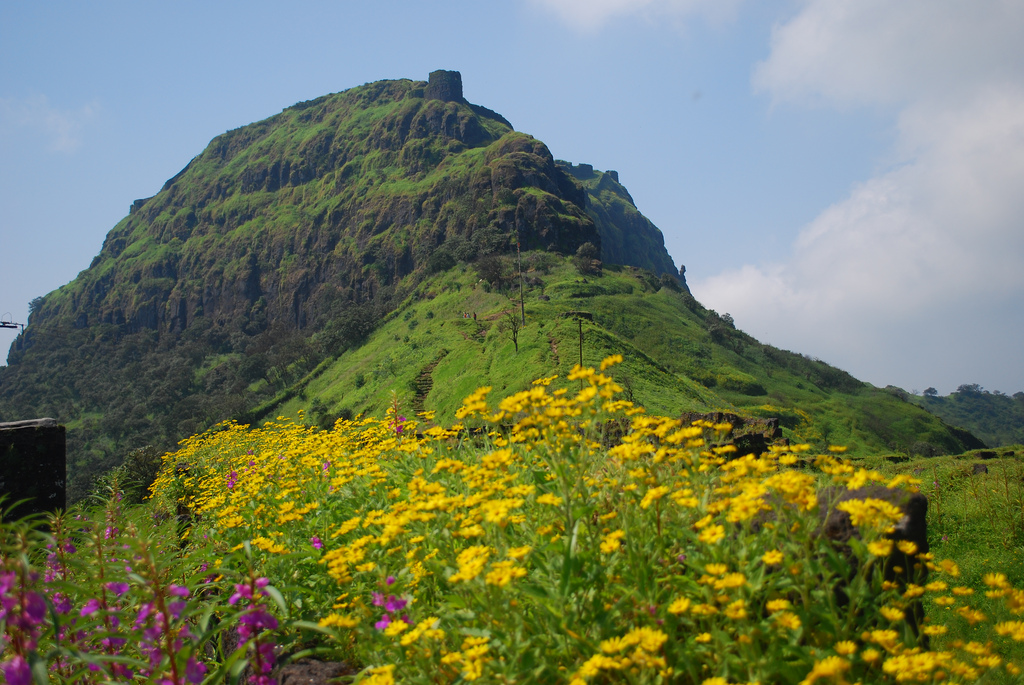
Monsoons scrub India's air, bringing its natural diversity in better view.

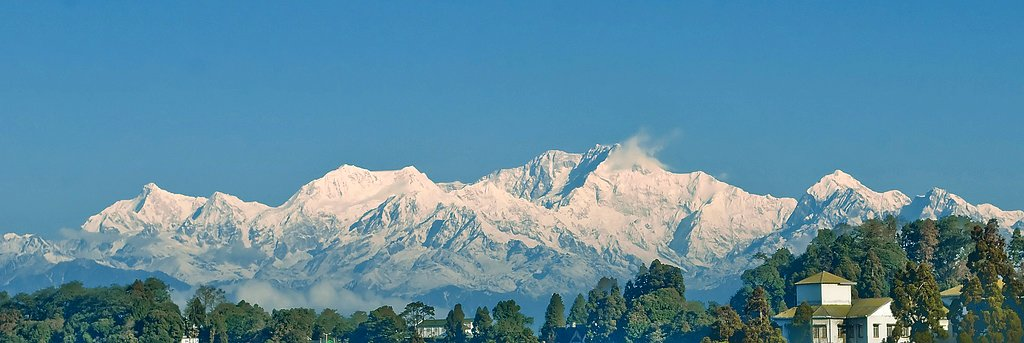
Himalayan peaks in eastern India on a day without haze.

Since about the late 1980s, the Supreme Court of India has been pro-actively engaged in India's environmental issues. In most countries, it is the executive and the legislative branches of the government that plan, implement and address environmental issues; the Indian experience is different. The Supreme Court of India has been engaged in interpreting and introducing new changes in the environmental jurisprudence directly. The Court has laid down new principles to protect the environment, re-interpreted environmental laws, created new institutions and structures, and conferred additional powers on the existing ones through a series of directions and judgments.

The Court's directions on environmental issues goes beyond the general questions of law, as is usually expected from the highest Court of a democratic country. The Supreme Court of India, in its order, includes executive actions and technical details of environmental actions to be implemented. Indeed, some critics of India's Supreme Court describe the Court as the Lords of Green Bench or Garbage Supervisor. Supporters of India's Supreme Court term these orders and the Indian bench as pioneering, both in terms of laying down new principles of law, and in delivering environmental justice.

The reasons for the increasing interjection of India's Supreme Court in governance arenas are, experts claim, complex. A key factor has been the failure of government agencies and the state owned enterprises in discharging their Constitutional and Statutory duties. This has prompted civil society groups to file public interest complaints with the Courts, particularly the Supreme Court, for suitable remedies.

Public interest litigation and judicial activism on environmental issues extends beyond India's Supreme Court. It includes the High Courts of individual states.

India's judicial activism on environmental issues has, some suggest, delivered positive effects to the Indian experience. Proponents claim that the Supreme Court has, through intense judicial activism, become a symbol of hope for the people of India. As a result of judicial activism, India's Supreme Court has delivered a new normative regime of rights and insisted that the Indian state cannot act arbitrarily but must act reasonably and in public interest on pain of its action being invalidated by judicial intervention.

India's judicial activism on environmental issues has, others suggest, had adverse consequences. Public interest cases are repeatedly filed to block infrastructure projects aimed at solving environmental issues in India, such as but not limiting to water works, expressways, land acquisition for projects, and electricity power generation projects. The litigation routinely delays such projects, often for years, whilst rampant pollution continues in India, and tens of thousands die from the unintended effects of pollution. Even after a stay related to an infrastructure project is vacated, or a court order gives a green light to certain project, new issues become grounds for court notices and new public interest litigation.

Judicial activism in India has, in several key cases, found state-directed economic development ineffective and a failure, then interpreted laws and issued directives that encourage greater competition and free market to reduce environmental pollution. In other cases, the interpretations and directives have preserved industry protection, labour practices and highly polluting state-owned companies detrimental to environmental quality of India. Proactive measures should be taken to conserve the depleting environment.

The Indian government tried to stop Greenpeace freedom of expression in 2015.

== List of laws ==
| Legislation | Year | Domain | Protected areas | Use of other natural resources |
|---|---|---|---|---|
| Indian Forest Act | 1927 | British India | Developed procedures for setting up and protection of reserved forests, protected forests, and village forests | Regulation of movement and transit of forest produce with duties on such produce. Special focus on timber |
| 1st Five Year Plan | 1951 | | | |
| 2nd Five Year Plan | 1956 | | | |
| 3rd Five Year Plan | 1961 | Almost the same but with added deer conservation acts | | |
| 4th Five Year Plan | 1969 | | | |
| Wildlife Protection Act | 1972 | India except J&K | Formalisation of national parks, wildlife sanctuaries, conservation reserves and community reserves. Protection to habitat and wildlife within premises of such protected areas. Development of National Board for Wildlife and State Boards for Wildlife for identification of future protected areas. | Penal codes for animal poaching, and trade in products derived from protected animals |
| National Wildlife Action Plan | 1973 | | | |
| 5th Five Year Plan | 1974 | | | |
| 6th Five Year Plan | 1978 | | | |
| 7th Five Year Plan | 1980. Forest (Conservation) Act, 1980 (with Amendments Made in 1988) | environment protection act 1986 (23 May 1986) I it is a legislation which signifies the central governments determination to take effective steps to protect the environment. | stating that: No State Government or other authority shall make any order directing-: (i) that any reserved forest shall cease to be reserved; (ii) that any forest land or any portion thereof may be used for any non-forest purpose; (iii) that any forest land or any portion thereof may be assigned by way of lease or otherwise to any private person or to any authority, corporation, agency or any other organisation not owned, managed or controlled by Government; (iv) that any forest land or any portion thereof may be cleared of trees which have grown naturally in that land or portion, for the purpose of using it for reafforestation. | |
| Environment (Protection) Act | 1986 | | | |
| National Forest Policy | 1988 | | | |
| Foreign Trade (Development and Regulation) Act | 1992 | | | |
| 8th Five Year Plan | 1992 | | | |
| 9th Five Year Plan | 1997 | | | |
| 10 Five Year Plan | 2002 | National Environmental Policy, 2006 | | |
| 11th Five Year Plan | 2007 | | | |

== See also ==
- Environmental issues in India
- Environmental policy of Narendra Modi
- Indian Council of Forestry Research and Education
