= Jagmohanlal Sinha =

Indian jurist (1920–2008)

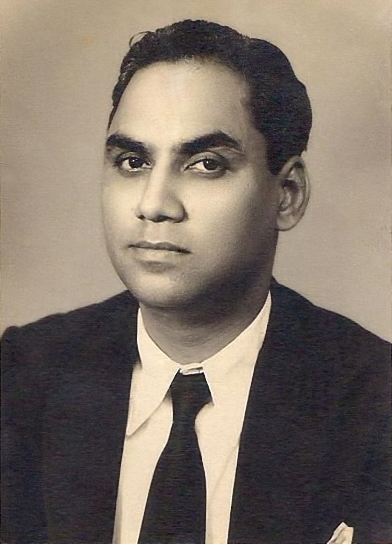

Judge of the Allahabad High Court
- In office 3 January 1970 – 12 May 1982

Personal details
- Born: 12 May 1920 Allahabad, Uttar Pradesh
- Died: 20 March 2008 (aged 87)

Justice Jagmohanlal Sinha(12 May 1920 – 20 March 2008) was an Indian judge known for his 1975 ruling in the State of Uttar Pradesh v. Raj Narain lawsuit, which invalidated the election of Prime Minister Indira Gandhi.

== Early life and education ==
Born on May 12, 1920, Sinha embarked on an educational journey that included Government High School in Aligarh, Bareilly College in Bareilly, and Meerut College in Meerut. He later pursued his legal studies at Agra University.

== Legal career ==
From 1943 to 1955, he practiced as a pleader in Bareilly. Subsequently, he served as the District Government Counsel (Criminal) in Bareilly until June 3, 1957. His career path also led him to work as a Civil & Sessions Judge and an Additional District Judge. Notably, he held the position of District & Sessions Judge Joint Secretary in the Law Department of the Uttar Pradesh Government. On January 3, 1970, he was appointed as an Additional Judge of the Allahabad High Court, and later, on August 25, 1972, he became a Permanent Judge.

=== 1975 verdict ===
Justice Sinha's most significant moment came in 1975 when he presided over the challenge to Prime Minister Indira Gandhi's victory in the 1971 Lok Sabha election. The case focused on allegations of electoral malpractices, including the illegal employment of a government servant, Yashpal Kapoor, for election-related work.

Justice Sinha conducted the court proceedings with a strong commitment to justice and judicial independence. His actions, such as not allowing lawyers to stand when the Prime Minister entered the courtroom, demonstrated his dedication to upholding the judiciary's dignity.

On June 12, 1975, Justice Jagmohanlal Sinha delivered his historic verdict, convicting Indira Gandhi of electoral malpractices and disqualifying her from holding any elected post under the Representation of People Act.

=== Impact and legacy ===
Sinha's judgment has been praised as a judgment of great courage by the Chief Justice of India - Mr. NV Ramana. Other members of the judicial panel were also politically humiliated and ostracized. Justice Jagmohanlal Sinha had been avoiding public appearances and even asked his stenographer to disappear before the result was announced.
