= Indian environmental law =

Broad information of Indian environmental law

Indian environmental law concerns the law and policy of India concerning the protection of the environment. Measures include attempts to address climate change and achieve a zero carbon economy.

Environment quality declined due to increasing pollution, loss of biological diversity, excessive concentration of harmful chemicals in the atmosphere and in food chains, and threats to life support systems. The Decisions taken at a United Nations conference on the Human Environment held in Stockholm in June 1972 were based on the world's resolve to protect the environment. Although several measures had been taken for environmental protection both before and after the conference it decided to enact a comprehensive law on the subject. Accordingly, an environment protection bill was introduced in the Parliament. Some of the areas covered include:

- Air pollution
- Water pollution
- Forest and wildlife protection
- Waste management
- Wild Life

As with environmental protection legislation in many countries, the regulations are effective only if they are properly enforced, which is not always the case in India.

Article 21 of the Constitution of India

== Legislation ==
The Environment Protection Act of 1986 is enforced by the Central Pollution Control Board and State Pollution Control Boards.

- National Green Tribunal established under the National Green Tribunal Act of 2010 has jurisdiction over all environmental cases dealing with a substantial environmental question and acts covered under the Water (Prevention and Control of Pollution) Act, 1974.
- Public Liability Insurance Act, 1991
- Air (Prevention and Control of Pollution) Act, 1981
- Air (Prevention and Control of Pollution) (Union Territories) Rules, 1983

=== Water ===
Legislation to protect water quality include:

- The Water (Prevention and Control of Pollution) Act, 1974
- The Water (Prevention and Control of Pollution) Cess Act, 1977
- Water (Prevention and Control of Pollution) Cess Rules, 1978
- Ganga Action Plan, 1986
- National Water Policy
- Coastal Regulation Zone
- Godavari Water Disputes Tribunal
- Interstate River Water Disputes Act
- Krishna Water Disputes Tribunal

=== Forests and wildlife ===
- Indian Forest Act, 1927
- Wild life protection act, 1972
- Forest (Conservation) Act, 1980
- National Forest Policy, 1988
- M. C. Mehta v. Kamal Nath (1997) 1 SCC 388
- Biological Diversity Act, 2002
- Protection of Plant Varieties and Farmers' Rights Act, 2001
- Wild Life Protection Act, 1972, which does not fall within the jurisdiction of the National Green Tribunal. Appeals can be filed in the Supreme Court of India.
- Prevention of Cruelty to Animals Act 1960
- CAMPA bill

=== Waste management ===
- Batteries (Management and Handling) Rules, 2001
- Recycled Plastics, Plastics Manufacture and Usage Rules, 1999
- Basel Convention on Control of TransboundaryMovements on Hazardous Wastes and Their Disposal, 1989 and Its Protocols
- Hazardous Wastes (Management and Handling) Amendment Rules, 2003
- Construction and Demolition Waste Management Rules, 2016

== See also ==
- Energy law
- Environmental policy of the European Union
- Environmental law
- United Kingdom environmental law
- Environmental policy in China
