= Thirty-ninth Amendment =

Thirty-ninth Amendment may refer to:

- Thirty-ninth Amendment of the Constitution of India, 1979 amendment placing the election of certain offices beyond the scrutiny of the Indian courts
- Thirty-ninth Amendment of the Constitution of Ireland, 2023 failed proposal to amend the constitution to expand the definition of family to include durable relationships outside marriage
