= Alampara Iron Ore Mine =

Iron ore mine in Kerala, India

Alampara mine is an iron ore mine located in Chakkittapara, Koyilandi, Kerala. It is spread across 406.45 hectares. It is estimated that the reserve has around 53 million tons of magnetite. The city of Kozhikode is about 65 km from the mines.

The Indian Bureau of mines approved this mining project. Requests have been made for forest and environment clearances. Beneficiation and Pellestisation plant is proposed by the MSPL. It will have a capacity of 1.2 million tonnes.

The Panchayat at Chikkittapara has been rejecting the requests to set up the mine. Locals and environmentalists have also been rejecting the mining plant. The area is declared an Ecologically sensitive zone, by the Kasturirangan committee. The Baldota group is applying for mining. The proposal has been rejected under the act of forest conservation and environmental protection. In 2013, the proposal was rejected by the LDF government, however, it has been proposed again.

The Karnataka-based MSPL moved to the Central mining tribunal to challenge the order, they were granted prior approval but Kerala High Court revoked the order. The company also failed to carry out a survey in the stipulated time.
