= Khaparwas =

Khaparwas (also spelled KhaparBass) is a village mainly of four caste in jhajjar District, Haryana, India. It falls under Matanhail Tehsil; this is covered under matanhail Block.

The post office code is 124106 same as used for Matanhail as its nearest post box number is of Matanhail. The total population of the village is about 2,500.

The village is among the BarahBaas (12 villages have Baas named in last and all are near to each other) villages of area, and it is 1 km inside from the State Highway from Bhiwani to Behal. The village has one middle government school up to VIII class. People of this village are mainly do agriculture, and have youngster also prefer to go into armed forces.

The village has a main temple named by Naga Baba Ji Ka Mandir that is in centre of the village, the devotees do prayer in evening daily, speciality of the Mandir is that there is no statues of the God kept as with belief that all gods are one.

== Wildlife sanctuary ==
The Khaparwas Wildlife Sanctuary (mainly in Kairu and Khaparwas) attracts a large number and variety of migratory birds, and situated at a distance of about 1.5 km from Bhindawas Wildlife Sanctuary; Khaparwas Wildlife Sanctuary as Eco-sensitive Zone from ecological and environmental point of view, duly taken care by Forest Minister and MLA from Tosham Smt. Kiran Choudhary w/o Late. Sh. Surender Singh.
