= M. C. Mehta v. Union of India and Others =

Landmark environmental law case in India

- Court: Supreme Court of India
- Decided: 30 December 1996
- Citation: (1997) 2 SCC 353

Case history
- Prior action: Concerns over pollution damaging the Taj Mahal
- Subsequent actions: Ongoing monitoring and further orders by the Supreme Court regarding the Taj Trapezium Zone.

Court membership
- Judges sitting: Kuldip Singh, Faizan Uddin

Keywords
- Environmental law, Public Interest Litigation, Precautionary Principle, Polluter Pays Principle, Sustainable Development, Protection of cultural heritage

M. C. Mehta vs. Union of India & Ors. (1996), (1997) 2 SCC 353, also known as Taj Trapezium Case, was a landmark public interest litigation (PIL) in the Indian environmental law decided by the Supreme Court of India that recognized the environmental threat to the Taj Mahal's cultural and historical significance from industrial pollution. The judgement banned the use of coal, coke, and other polluting industries in the Taj Trapezium Zone (TTZ), a 10,400 square kilometer area around the monument. The decision was rendered on 30 December 1996 by a Division Bench consisting of Justice Kuldip Singh and Justice Faizan Uddin.

The case was initiated by prominent environmental lawyer M. C. Mehta, who filed a PIL in 1984. The petition highlighted the deteriorating condition of the Taj Mahal's white marble which was turning yellow due to air pollution from nearby industries, particularly foundries, chemical plants, and the Mathura Refinery. The judgment is noted for its application of the precautionary principle and the polluter pays principle, and for prioritizing the protection of cultural heritage and the environment over industrial development that is unsustainable. The case also set a strong precedent for the use of important environmental principles in court proceedings.

== Background ==
Concerns regarding the environmental integrity of the Taj Mahal emerged in the late 1970s, coinciding with the commissioning of the Mathura Refinery, an oil refinery located approximately 40 kilometers northwest of the monument. In response to public and parliamentary apprehension, the Government of India appointed an expert committee in 1977, chaired by Dr. S. Varadarajan, to assess the potential environmental impact of the refinery on the monument. The committee's 1978 report confirmed that pollutants, primarily sulfur dioxide emitted from the refinery and other local industries like iron foundries and glassworks, posed a significant threat. It detailed how atmospheric sulfur dioxide could convert into sulfuric acid and, through acid rain, cause "sulfation," a process that corrodes and yellows the monument's marble facade. Additionally, suspended particulate matter, including soot from the burning of fossil fuels, settled on the facade, contributing to its yellowing.

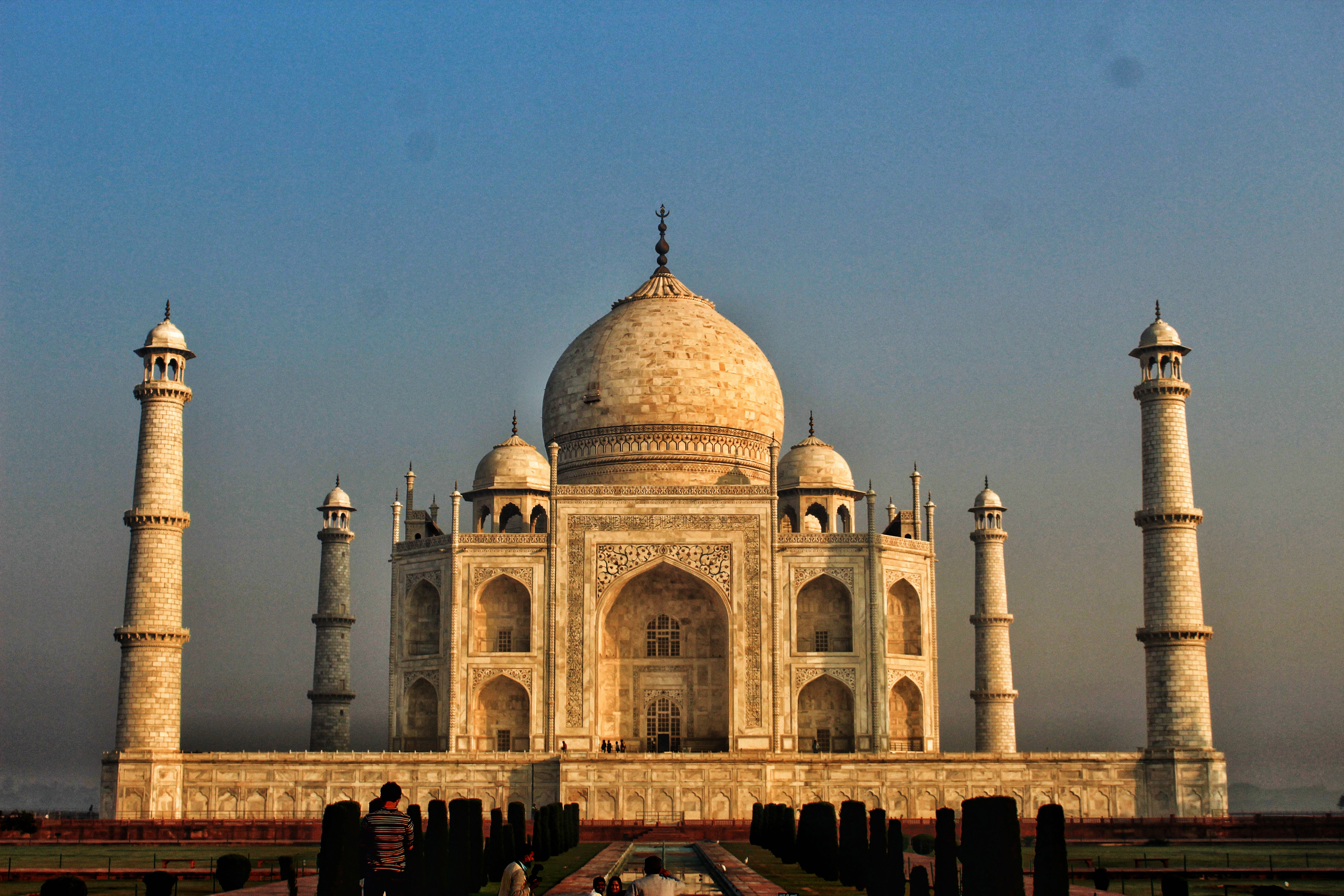
Taj Mahal shown (edited to highlight damage) with the areas and degree of damage and yellowish tinge due to corrosion of the marble surface from nitrous and sulfuric acid present in the air.

A key recommendation of the Varadarajan Committee was the creation of a protected zone around the monument. Based on this, the Central Board for the Prevention and Control of Water Pollution (now the Central Pollution Control Board) formally defined and proposed the creation of the Taj Trapezium Zone (TTZ), a trapezium-shaped area covering 10,400-square-kilometre (4,000 sq mi), which included the districts of Agra, Firozabad, Mathura, Hathras and Bharatpur, and within which stringent pollution control measures were advised. The committee also recommended closing down two major thermal power stations and replacing coal with cleaner diesel in railway shunting yards.

Despite these early findings and recommendations, a comprehensive action plan was not fully implemented. By the early 1980s, the monument's deterioration was visibly apparent. This inaction prompted environmental lawyer M. C. Mehta to file a public interest litigation before the Supreme Court of India in 1984. His petition alleged that the state authorities had failed in their constitutional and statutory duty to protect a monument of national and international importance. During the prolonged litigation that followed, the Supreme Court commissioned further studies, including four reports by the National Environmental Engineering Research Institute (NEERI), which reinforced the earlier findings and provided an updated, extensive scientific basis for the court's eventual judgment.

== Judgment ==
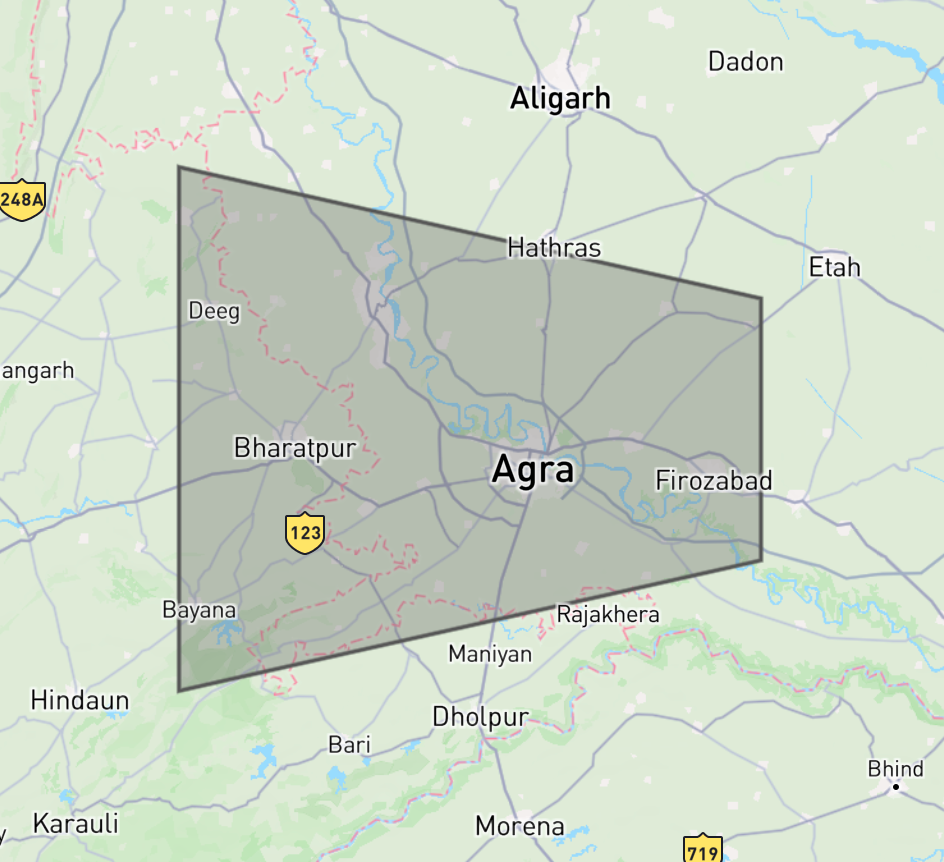
The area of Taj Trapezium Zone established per ruling by the court order.

On 30 December 1996, a Division Bench of the Supreme Court, comprising Justices Kuldip Singh and Faizan Uddin, delivered the final judgment in favour of M. C. Mehta. The Court found that the pollutants from coke and coal-consuming companies were causing severe damage to the Taj Mahal and its surroundings in the Taj Trapezium Zone (TTZ). It recognised the immense cultural value of the Taj Mahal and other historic sites in Agra and the need of their preservation for future generations.

The judgment applied key principles of environmental law, such as sustainable development, precautionary principle, and polluter pays, along with Articles 21, 47, 48A, 51(A)(g) of the Indian constitution and existing environment laws such as The Water (Prevention and Control of Pollution) Act, 1974, the Air (Prevention and Control of Pollution) Act, 1981 and the Environmental Protection Act, 1986 to address the issue.

The court held that the use of coal and coke be banned in the TTZ and the 292 named entities in the petition shift to compressed natural gas as their industrial fuel, failing which they must cease operations within TTZ. The court also directed the state to provided employment assurance and relocation assistance including compensation for the workers impacted by the transition.

== Aftermath and legacy ==
The judgment had a significant and lasting impact on environmental governance in India. It led to the closure and relocation of numerous polluting industries from Agra and mandated a shift to cleaner technologies for those that remained. The case set a strong precedent for judicial intervention in matters of environmental protection and the safeguarding of cultural heritage. In 1999, the Supreme Court further ordered closure of 53 iron foundries and 107 other factories in Agra that had not followed its order.

The Taj Trapezium Zone Authority was established as a statutory body to oversee the implementation of the court's directives and manage the environmental conditions in the region. The Supreme Court has continued to monitor the situation in the TTZ, issuing further orders over the years to address ongoing environmental threats, including vehicular pollution and deforestation.

Despite the judgment, challenges in controlling pollution in the TTZ persist. Issues such as illegal industrial operations, vehicular emissions, and pollution of the Yamuna River continue to pose a threat to the Taj Mahal. The case remains an active file in the Supreme Court, with various applications and reports being periodically reviewed by the court.

== See also ==
- M. C. Mehta
- Environmental law in India
- Public interest litigation in India
- List of landmark court decisions in India
