= Janhit Abhiyan v. Union of India =

Landmark decision of Supreme Court of India

- Court: Supreme Court of India
- Full case name: Janhit Abhiyan v. Union of India
- Started: 09 January 2019
- Decided: 07 November 2022
- Citation: WP (C) 55/2019

Court membership
- Judges sitting: Justice Uday Umesh Lalit (CJI), Justice Dinesh Maheshwari, Justice Bela M Trivedi, Justice J B Pardiwala, and Justice Shripathi Ravindra Bhat

Janhit Abhiyan v. Union of India, WP (C) 55/2019, also known as the EWS Reservation case, was a landmark decision of the Supreme Court of India upholding the validity of the One Hundred and Third Amendment Act of 2019.

== Background ==
On January 9, 2019, the Parliament introduced amendments to Articles 15 and Article 16 of the Constitution India, incorporating clauses 15(6) and 16(6) to extend reservation in educational institutions and employment opportunities to economically weaker sections of society. This amendment, known as the One Hundred and Third (103rd) Constitutional Amendment, has been a subject of controversy since its enactment. It empowered the state to introduce specific provisions for economically disadvantaged sections in education and employment, thus expanding the scope of reservations.

Following the enactment of the One Hundred and Third Amendment Act of 2019, several writ petitions were filed, seeking to declare the amendment unconstitutional and in violation of the basic structure concept. By adding Articles 15(6) and 16(6) to the Indian Constitution, the state acquired the authority to impose specific restrictions on reservations for economically weaker sections, with a maximum of 10%. The Superem court compiled all the writ under the case Janhit Abhiyan Vs Union of India.

== Primary issue in the case ==
1. The sole reliance on economic criteria for determining reservations is deemed to be in violation of the fundamental principles enshrined in the Constitution.
2. The exclusion of socially and educationally backward groups (SEBCs), including Scheduled Castes (SCs), Scheduled Tribes (STs), and Other Backward Classes (OBCs), from the provisions for economically weaker sections is perceived as discriminatory and contradictory to the core principles of the Constitution.
3. Denying reservation benefits to classes mentioned in Articles 15(4), 15(5), and 16(4) based on economic considerations is argued to be in violation of the Equality Code and the basic structure theory.

== Decision ==
The Supreme Court of India, in its Judgment delivered on November 7, 2022, upheld the legality of the One Hundred and Third Amendment Act of 2019 with a majority decision of 3:2

=== Majority Judgement ===
The majority judgement was authored by Justice(s) Dinesh Maheshwari, Bela M Trivedi, and J B Pardiwala. The court observed that the reservation for the EWS is a valid classification and does not infringe upon the existing reservations for the socially and educationally backward classes (SEBCs), Scheduled Castes (SCs), and Scheduled Tribes (STs). It was noted that the EWS category is based on economic backwardness and not on caste or social backwardness, which are the criteria for existing reservations.

The court further held that the reservation for the EWS is a legitimate means to achieve the goal of providing equal opportunities and social justice to all sections of society. It recognized that economic inequality and poverty can also be a form of social disadvantage and that the reservation for the EWS is a step towards addressing this aspect of inequality.

=== Minority Judgement ===
Justice(s) Uday Umesh Lalit, and Shripathi Ravindra Bhat authored the dissenting opinion and held that the 103rd amendment to the constitution was violative of the basic structure on two grounds. First, they argued that the exclusion of SCs/STs/OBCs/SEBCs from the 10% quota of EWS reservation was against the equality code and discriminated against the historically disadvantaged and deprived communities. Second, they argued that reservation under Article 16 could not be based solely on economic criteria, as it would go against the purpose of providing representation to the socially and educationally backward classes.
