= Sita Soren v. Union of India =

Indian Supreme Court ruling on legislative immunity

- Court: Supreme Court of India
- Decided: 4 March 2024
- Citation: 2024 INSC 161

Case history
- Prior action: Criminal Appeal No. 451 of 2019; appeal from Jharkhand High Court decision refusing to quash bribery charges

Holding
- Members of Parliament and State Legislatures do not enjoy immunity under Articles 105(2) and 194(2) of the Constitution for acts of bribery

Court membership
- Judges sitting: Dhananjaya Y. Chandrachud (CJI), A.S. Bopanna, M.M. Sundresh, P.S. Narasimha, J.B. Pardiwala, P.V. Sanjay Kumar, Manoj Misra

Case opinions
- Unanimous

Laws applied
- This case overturned a previous ruling
- P. V. Narasimha Rao v. State (1998)

Keywords
- Legislative immunity, bribery, parliamentary privilege

Sita Soren v. Union of India, 2024 INSC 161, is a judgement by Supreme Court of India that ruled that a lawmaker, such as the Member of Parliament, does not enjoy immunity under the Articles 105(2) and 194(2) of the Constitution against ordinary criminal charges such as bribery.

The landmark ruling upheld a lower court decision while overruling its own precedent in P. V. Narasimha Rao v. State (1988) and established a twofold test for immunity – that the claim is tethered to the collective functioning of the House and that it is necessary to the discharge of the essential duties of a legislator.

== Background ==
Sita Soren, a member of the Jharkhand Legislative Assembly from the Jharkhand Mukti Morcha (JMM), was accused of accepting a bribe to cast her vote for an independent candidate in the Rajya Sabha elections of 2012. In the open-ballot system, however, she cast her final vote for a different candidate. Upon complaint by the Election Commission of India, the Central Bureau of Investigation (CBI) opened an investigation and filed charges of criminal conspiracy and criminal misconduct under Sections 120B, 171E of the Indian Penal Code, 1860; and Section 13(1)(d) of The Prevention of Corruption Act, 1988.

Sita Soren sought to quash the proceedings and challenged the criminal charges in Jharkhand High Court claiming legal immunity under the Article 194(2) of the Indian Constitution. Articles 105(2) and 194(2) of the Constitution of India describe the powers and privileges of the members of parliament and state legislatures, stipulating that no member "shall be liable to any proceedings in any court in respect of anything said or any vote given by him in the Legislature or any committee thereof." The petition specifically relied on State v. Rao, a ruling by the Supreme Court of India, that upheld a lawmaker's immunity for their speech and votes as part of the parliamentary privileges.

=== Judgment by Jharkhand High Court ===
Jharkhand High Court, however, interpreted the Rao v. State ruling to mean that "not voting at all, and not voting per the condition of the bribe," were both instances that would not qualify for the privilege. So the fact that Soren cast her final vote for a different candidate, contrary to the terms of the bribe, led the court to conclude that she would not be protected under Article 194(2).

On 26 March 2014, Soren appealed the judgement to the Supreme Court of India through a Special Leave petition. While the case was pending before Supreme Court, Soren had surrendered to the lower court and was in jail for seven months before being granted bail in September 2014.

== Judgement ==
The case was heard by a seven-judge bench of the Supreme Court which unanimously ruled that Members of Parliament (MPs) and Members of Legislative Assemblies (MLAs) do not enjoy immunity under Articles 105(2) and 194(2) of the Indian Constitution in cases of bribery. Thus the Court overruled the majority opinion and precedent in P. V. Narasimha Rao v. State (1988) which provided broader protections for lawmakers.

== Significance ==
The decision effectively constrained the parliamentary privileges of lawmakers, strictly limiting the immunity to their parliamentary functions, and therefore subject to the criminal law concerning allegations of bribery.

== See also ==
- Corruption in India
- List of landmark court decisions in India
