= Convention Relating to the International Status of Refugees =

1933 League of Nations document

The Convention Relating to the International Status of Refugees, of 28 October 1933, was a League of Nations document which dealt with administrative measures such as the issuance of Nansen certificates, refoulement, legal questions, labour conditions, industrial accidents, welfare and relief, education, fiscal regime and exemption from reciprocity, and provided for the creation of committees for refugees. It was the precursor to the 1951 Convention Relating to the Status of Refugees, which is governed by the United Nations.

The Convention of 1933 was ratified by nine States, including France and the United Kingdom. The UK did not, however, accept the second paragraph of Article 3. Nevertheless, it was by virtue of this Convention that the principle of non-refoulement acquired the status of international treaty law.
