= Non-refoulement =

Principle of international asylum law

Non-refoulement (/rəˈfuːlmɒ̃/) is a fundamental principle of international law anchored in the 1951 Convention Relating to the Status of Refugees that forbids a country from deporting ("refoulement") any person to any country in which their "life or freedom would be threatened" on account of "race, religion, nationality, membership of a particular social group or political opinion". The only exception to non-refoulement according to the Convention Relating to the Status of Refugees are "reasonable grounds" of "danger to the security of the country" or "danger to the community of that country". Unlike political asylum, which applies only to those who can prove a well-grounded fear of political persecution, non-refoulement refers to the generic deportation of people, including refugees into war zones and other disaster locales.

Non-refoulement is generally seen as customary international law, where it applies even to states that are not parties to the 1951 Convention Relating to the Status of Refugees or its 1967 Protocol. It is debatable whether non-refoulement is a peremptory norm (jus cogens) of international law, where non-refoulement must always be applied without any adjustment for any purpose or under any circumstances (derogation). The debate over jus cogens nature of non-refoulement was rekindled following the September 11, 2001, terror attacks in the United States as well as other terrorist attacks in Europe.

== History ==
The Convention relating to the International Status of Refugees of 28 October 1933 was ratified by nine states, including France and (with a caveat) the United Kingdom. It was by virtue of this Convention that the principle of non-refoulement acquired the status of international treaty law.

The principle of non-refoulement is important because of its role in an international collective memory of the failure of nations during World War II to provide a haven to refugees fleeing certain genocide at the hands of Nazi Germany. Following the war, the need for international checks on state sovereignty over refugees became apparent to the international community.

During the war, several states had forcibly returned or denied admission to German and French Jews fleeing the Holocaust. In 1939, the ocean liner MS St. Louis sailed from Germany with over 900 Jewish passengers who were fleeing Nazi persecution. The ship sailed for Cuba, where the passengers expected to find refuge. However, Cuba admitted only twenty-eight passengers and refused to admit the rest. The ship then set sail for Florida in the hopes of finding refuge in the United States. But the U.S. government, and later also Canada, refused to allow the ship to dock and refused to accept any passengers. With conditions on the ship deteriorating and seemingly nowhere else to go, the ship returned to Europe, where approximately thirty percent of those passengers were later murdered in the Holocaust. Switzerland refused entry to nearly 20,000 French Jews who sought asylum there after the Nazi takeover of France. The Swiss argued the "boat is full" with respect to refugees during the War, and they were not obligated under existing law to accept French Jews for resettlement. As a result the Jews were forced to return to France, where most were killed.

The Allies implemented a program of repatriation of Soviet citizens after World War II, regardless of their wishes, despite evidence they would face persecution from the Soviet government.

Non-refoulement presents an inherent conflict with state sovereignty, as it infringes on a state's right to exercise control over its own borders and those who reside within them. In legal proceedings immediately following World War II, non-refoulement was viewed as a distinct right, which could be abridged under certain circumstances, such as those spelled out in Article 33, Section 2 of the 1951 Convention.

In the 1960s, the European Commission on Human Rights recognized non-refoulement as a subsidiary of prohibitions on torture. As the ban on torture is jus cogens, this linkage rendered the prohibition on refoulement absolute and challenged the legality of refoulement for the purposes of state security. Through court cases (see Soering v. United Kingdom and Chahal v. United Kingdom) and interpretations of various international treaties in the 1980s, the European Commission on Human Rights shifted preference away from preserving state sovereignty and towards protecting persons who might be refouled. This interpretation permitted no abridgments of non-refoulement protections, even if the state was concerned a refugee may be a terrorist or pose other immediate threats to the state.

=== 21st century ===
Following terror attacks in the United States and Europe, states have renewed calls for permitting refoulement in the interest of national security, as repatriation is the most effective method of dispatching refugees thought to present a credible threat. While recent treaties typically include specific obligations that prevent refoulement under essentially any circumstances, the interest of national security has led individual states and the European Union to seek ways around non-refoulement protections that balance security and human rights.

Today, the principle of non-refoulement from countries that are signatories to the 1951 Convention Relating to the Status of Refugees, the 1967 Protocol Convention Relating to the Status of Refugees, or the 1984 Convention Against Torture depends on the interpretation of the Article 33 of the 1951 Convention.

One of the grey areas of law that is most hotly debated within signatory circles is the interpretation of Article 33 of the 1951 Convention. Interdiction of potential refugee transporting vessels on the high seas has been a common practice by the US government in particular, raising the question of whether Article 33 requires a refugee to be within a country or simply within the power of a country to trigger the right against refoulement.

A prohibition of rejection at the border would imply a right of entry for any asylum seeker, which explains the reluctance for some states to endorse non-rejection at the border.

== Relevant laws ==
- Article 3 of the 1933 Convention relating to the International Status of Refugees contained the first mention of non-refoulement in international law, and prevented party states from expelling legally-residing refugees or turning away refugees at the borders of their home countries. This treaty was ratified by only a few states and gained little traction in international law.
- The principle of non-refoulement was officially enshrined in Article 33 of the 1951 Convention Relating to the Status of Refugees. Article 33 contains the following two paragraphs that define the prohibition of the expulsion or return of a refugee:
  1. No Contracting State shall expel or return ('refouler') a refugee in any manner whatsoever to the frontiers of territories where his life or freedom would be threatened on account of his race, religion, nationality, membership of a particular social group or political opinion.
  2. The benefit of the present provision may not, however, be claimed by a refugee whom there are reasonable grounds for regarding as a danger to the security of the country in which he is, or who, having been convicted by a final judgment of a particularly serious crime, constitutes a danger to the community of that country.
  — Convention and Protocol Relating to the Status of Refugees, Article 33
- The 1967 Protocol Relating to the Status of Refugees removed geographic and temporal limitations of the 1951 Convention Relating to the Status of Refugees.
- The 1984 Convention against Torture and other Cruel, Inhuman or Degrading Treatment or Punishment held that non-refoulement emanated from larger protections from torture and inhumane treatment.
  1. No State Party shall expel, return ("refouler") or extradite a person to another State where there are substantial grounds for believing that he would be in danger of being subjected to torture.
  2. For the purpose of determining whether there are such grounds, the competent authorities shall take into account all relevant considerations including, where applicable, the existence in the State concerned of a consistent pattern of gross, flagrant or mass violations of human rights.
  — Torture and Other Cruel, Inhuman or Degrading Treatment or Punishment, Article 3
  The protection from torture and inhumane treatment is generally considered an absolute right (Peremptory norm) and with this convention non-refoulement to countries with risk of torture and inhumane treatment is considered an absolute right as well.

=== Regional ===
- Article III of the Asian-African Legal Consultative Organization's (then known as the Asian-African Legal Consultative Committee) 1996 Principles Concerning Treatment of Refugees states:
  No one seeking asylum in accordance with these Principles should, except for overriding reasons of national security or safeguarding the populations, be subjected to measures such as rejection at the frontier, return or expulsion which would result in compelling him to return to or remain in a territory if there is a well-founded fear of persecution endangering his life, physical integrity or liberty in that territory.
- Article II(3) of the Organization for African Unity's Convention Governing the Specific Aspects of Refugee Problems in Africa, signed in 1969, makes provisions for asylum seekers fleeing war, colonial dominance, or social unrest.
- Article 22(8) of the 1969 American Convention on Human Rights establishes danger to an asylum seeker's "right to life or personal freedom" as the threshold for non-refoulement among American states.
- Per Article 3(2) of the 1957 European Convention on Extradition and Article 4(5) of the 1981 Inter-American Convention on Extradition, the principle of non-refoulement also applies to extradition cases in which the person believes they will be tried or biased based specifically on one of the protected factors.
- Resolution of 20 June 1995 of the Council of the European Union on minimum guarantees for asylum procedures:
  Any asylum-seeker must be able to lodge an [asylum] application at the frontier. The application may then be examined to establish, prior to the decision on admission, whether it is manifestly unfounded. However, where there is a host third country, there may be exceptions to the principle of "non-refoulement".

== Interpretations ==
Though the principle of non-refoulement is a non-negotiable aspect of international law, states have interpreted Article 33 of the 1951 Convention in various ways, and they have constructed their legal responses to asylum seeker in corresponding manners. The four most common interpretations are:

Strict
This interpretation holds that non-refoulement laws only apply to asylum seekers who have physically entered a state's borders. States using this interpretation often enact policies and procedures designed to block asylum seekers from reaching their borders.
Strict, with a narrow reading
This interpretation holds that only certain refugees are legally entitled to non-refoulement protection. If the country receiving an asylum seeker does not find that their "life or freedom would be threatened" by refoulement, this interpretation holds that they can be legitimately returned to their country of origin.
Collectivist
This approach involves international systems designed to process the asylum claim in the country in which a person initially seeks asylum and redistribute them among other countries. This approach relies on the logic that Article 33 does not include language requiring states receiving asylum seekers to permit them to remain permanently, only an obligation not to send them back to a region in which they face likely danger. Refugee relocation agreements between countries must ensure they are not sent back by the new host country. It is immaterial whether a country is a party to the 1951 Convention. In fact, the European Court of Human Rights found in M.S.S. v. Belgium and Greece that the risk of onward ('indirect') refoulment, even via a party to the 1951 convention, prohibits deportation under EU refugee and human rights law.
Collectivist, with laws preventing asylum seekers from reaching sovereign borders
This approach is not an interpretation of Article 33, but a way around it. It combines the strict and collectivist approaches. States using this approach establish non-sovereign areas within their borders, primarily at travel hubs. Asylum seekers presenting themselves at such areas are then sent to another country to have their asylum claims processed. As with traditional collectivism, the asylum seeker cannot be sent to a country in which they face likely danger.

== Examples of violations ==
Thailand's forcible repatriation of 45,000 Cambodian refugees at Preah Vihear, on 12 June 1979, is considered to be a classic example of refoulement. The refugees were forced at gunpoint across the border and down a steep slope into a minefield. Those who refused were shot by Thai soldiers. Approximately 3,000 refugees (about 7 percent) died.

Tanzania's actions during the Rwandan genocide in 1994 have been alleged to have violated the non-refoulement principle. During the height of the crisis, when the refugee flows rose to the level of a "mass exodus", the Tanzanian government closed its borders to a group of more than 50,000 Rwandan refugees fleeing genocidal violence. In 1996, before Rwanda had reached an appropriate level of stability, around 500,000 refugees were returned to Rwanda from Zaire.

The Australian government has been accused by the UNHCR, as well as more than 50 Australian legal scholars, of violating the principle of non-refoulement by returning 41 Tamil and Singhalese refugees to the Sri Lankan Navy in June or July 2014, as part of Operation Sovereign Borders.

In 2014, the Australian Parliament passed the Migration and Maritime Powers Legislation Amendment (Resolving the Asylum Legacy Caseload) Act 2014 (Cth). That Act provides that "for the purposes of removal from Australia of an unlawful non-citizen, Australia's non-refoulement obligations are irrelevant".

In 2017, Dina Ali Lasloom was forced back to Saudi Arabia with the cooperation of the government of the Philippines.

In 2018 Matteo Salvini (Italy's former interior minister) allegedly breached its obligation of non-refoulement by refusing to rescue 93 migrants fleeing Libya and consequently organising a "privatised push-back", that is sending back migrants using merchant ships as proxy; which in this case resulted in the migrants being returned to the port of Misurata in Libya, where they were beaten, tortured and in some cases killed.

In 2019, South Korea deported two North Korean defectors back to North Korea, on claims that they had committed murder. The move was condemned by human rights activists as the two would likely face execution upon their return.

China, in accordance with the agreements it reached with North Korea in 1986, apprehends North Koreans who enter its territory and sends them back to North Korea. Human rights activists say China is violating international law and that the returned North Koreans are likely to be executed.

In 2021, Malaysia deported 1,086 Myanmar nationals, despite a court order temporarily halting the repatriation amid concerns the group could be at risk if they were returned to military-ruled Myanmar.

In 2021, the Supreme Court of India in Mohammad Salimullah v. Union of India, allowed the deportation of Rohingya Muslim refugees back to Myanmar.

In 2022, the UK government proposed the Rwanda asylum plan, which aims to deport migrants who enter the UK illegally to a "safe" third country, Rwanda. The policy has faced legal challenges and European Court of Human Rights (ECtHR) ruled in June 2022 in N.S.K. v. the United Kingdom (28774/22) that the UK government's plan violates the European Convention on Human Rights (ECHR) because once in Rwanda, migrants "would not have access to fair and efficient procedures for the determination of refugee status," thus violating their rights. Additionally, the court found that "persons relocated to Rwanda may be at risk of detention and treatment not following international standards should they express dissatisfaction or protest at their conditions after arrival." Once in Rwanda, migrants might not be able to seek legal recourse as Rwanda operates outside the jurisdiction of the ECtHR, and there is an "absence of any legally enforceable mechanism for the applicant's return to the United Kingdom in the event of a successful merits challenge before the domestic courts." In November 2023, the UK Supreme Court ruled that the policy is illegal under UK domestic law and international obligations because the policy continues to violate non-refoulement.

According to a 2025 analysis in the American Journal of International Law, the second Donald Trump administration had violated non-refoulement by closing the border to asylum seekers, expansion of expedited removal, and its practice of rendition to torture.

== See also ==
- Border
- Impediment to expulsion
- Monism and dualism in international law

== Literature ==
- Kees Wouters International legal standards for the protection from refoulement - a legal analysis of the prohibitions on refoulement contained in the Refugee Convention, the European Convention on Human Rights, the International Covenant on Civil and Political Rights and the Convention against Torture, Antwerpen: Intersentia, 2009.
- Guy S. Goodwin-Gill & Jane McAdam The refugee in international law, Oxford: Oxford UP, 2007 (prev. 1983, 1996)
- Académie de Droit International de La Haye / Hague Academy of International Law Le droit d'asile = The right of asylum, Dordrecht: Nijhoff (1990).
