= Taj Trapezium Zone =

- Environmental protection zone
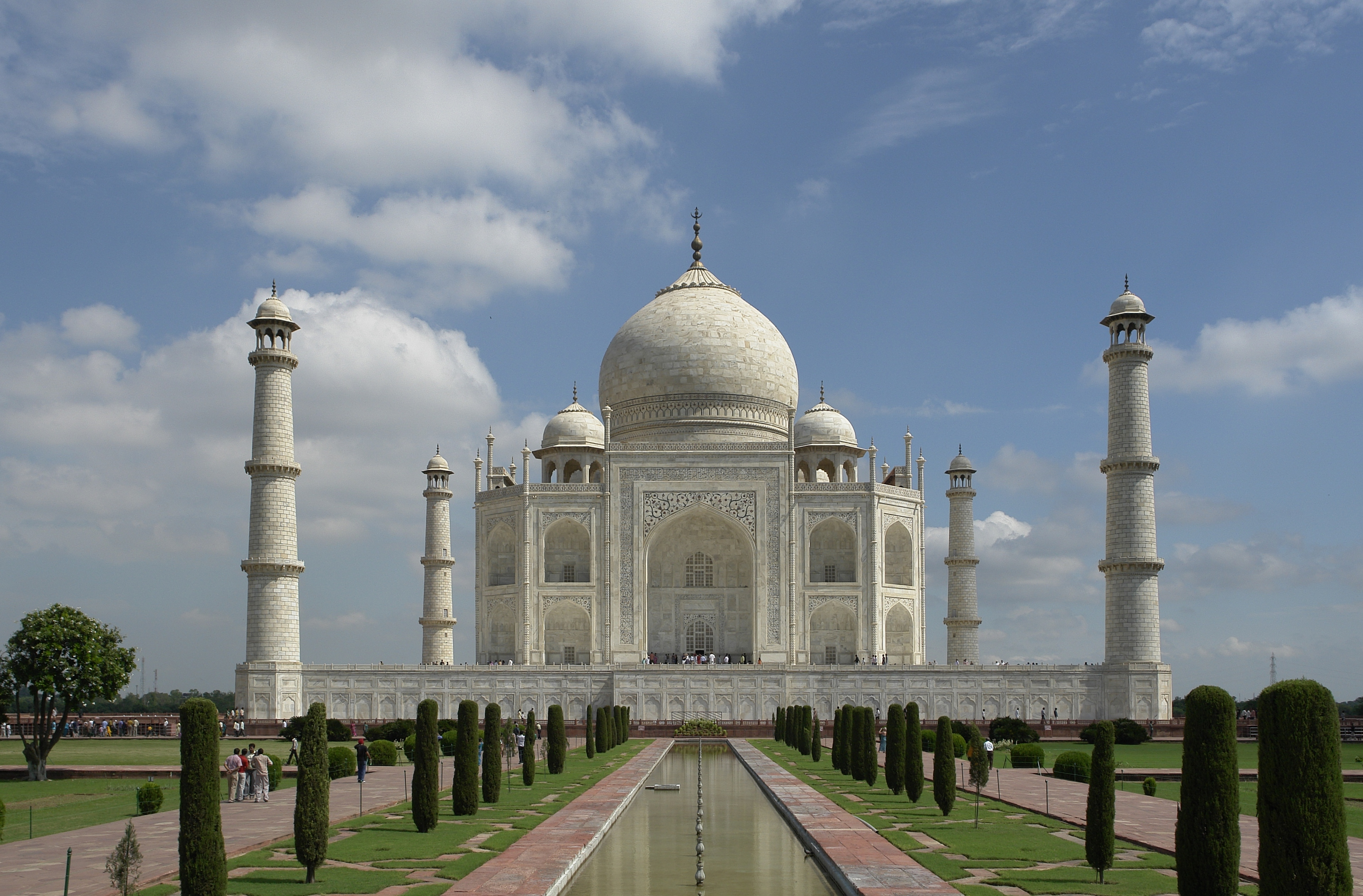
- The Taj Mahal, the central monument protected within the zone.
- Nickname: TTZ
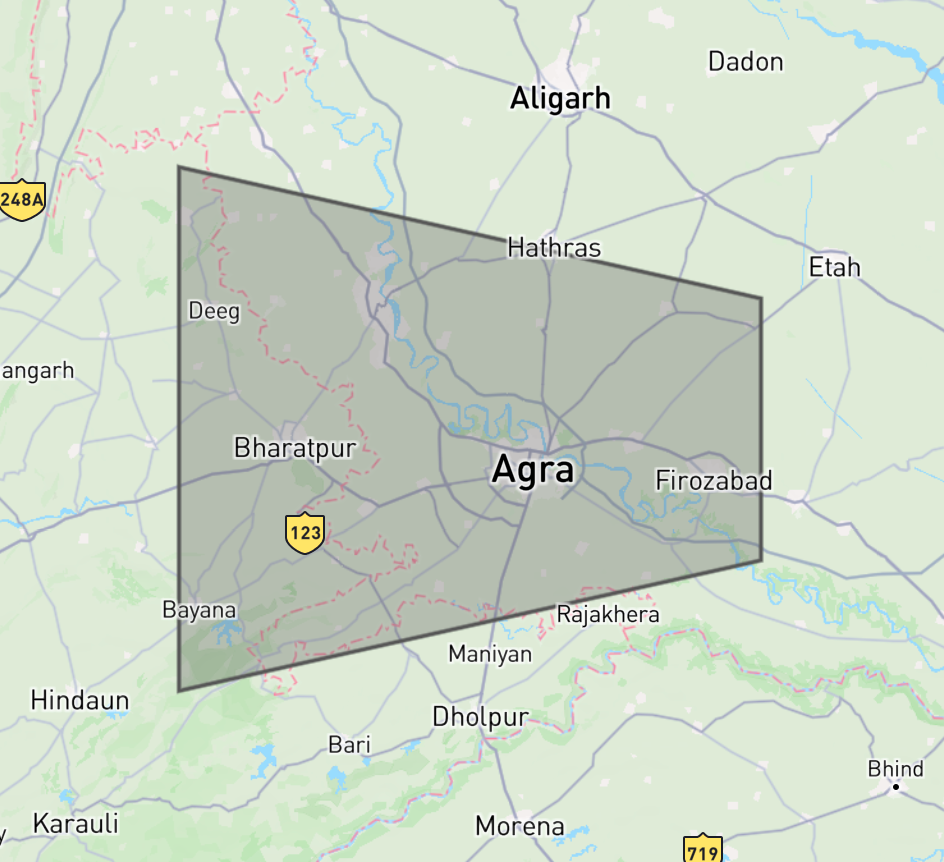
- Country: India
- States: Uttar Pradesh, Rajasthan
- Divisions: Agra division, Bharatpur division
- Notified: December 30, 1996

Government
  - Governing body: Taj Trapezium Zone Authority

Area
  - Total: 10,400 km^{2} (4,000 sq mi)
- Time zone: UTC+5:30 (IST)
- Website: www.ttzagra.com

Taj Trapezium Zone is a trapezium-shaped protected area covering 10,400-square-kilometre (4,000 sq mi) around Agra, India consisting of three Mughal-era World Heritage Sites—Taj Mahal, Agra Fort, and Fatehpur Sikri—and over 40 other monuments of national and cultural significance. The area covers parts of Uttar Pradesh and Rajasthan states in India, including of Agra, Firozabad, Mathura, Vrindavan, Hathras and Bharatpur.

The zone was established in 1996 following a landmark decision by Supreme Court of India in M. C. Mehta v. Union of India & Ors. to protect the Taj Mahal from industrial pollution, where the court banned the use of coke or coal for industries operating within this zone and established a regulatory oversight. Over the years, Supreme Court has continued to judicially protect Taj Trapezium Zone, ruling to limit tree felling, construction, industrial expansion, and imposing financial penalties in many cases. The regulatory oversight is provided by the Taj Trapezium Zone Pollution (Prevention and Control) Authority, a statutory body established under the court ruling.

== History ==
Taj Trapezium Zone was constituted following Supreme Court's order in 1996 in the case of M.C. Mehta v. Union of India & Ors. This decision was in response to a Public Interest Litigation seeking to protect the Taj Mahal from environmental pollution. The Supreme Court’s directives included strict pollution control measures such as the closure or relocation of polluting industries, large-scale tree plantation, restrictions on vehicular movement, promotion of battery-operated vehicles, and bans on construction and mining activities near the monument. Subsequently, the Central Government constituted the Taj Trapezium Zone Pollution (Prevention and Control) Authority in 1998 through a gazette notification (S.O. 350(E), dated May 13, 1998) under the Environment (Protection) Act, 1986.

== Overview ==
The Taj Trapezium Zone forms a trapezoid bounded on the west by the line from 26°45′N, 77°15′E to 27°45′N, 77°15′E and on the east by the line from 27°00′N, 78°30′E to 27°30′N, 78°30′E. It lies within the Agra Division of Uttar Pradesh and the Bharatpur Division of Rajasthan. The area is divided into four zones based on types of industries: Orange, White, Red, and Green.

The zone contains following notable monuments:

- Taj Mahal
- Agra Fort
- Fatehpur Sikri
- Akbar's tomb
- Tomb of Mariam-uz-Zamani

== See also ==
- Environmental law in India
