= National Forest Policy, 1988 =

Act of the Parliament of India

Parliament of India
- Long title: An Act to provide for the conservation of forests and for matters connected there with or ancillary or incidental thereto.
- Territorial extent: The whole of India.
- Enacted by: Parliament of India
- Enacted: 1988
- Status: In force

The National Forest Policy, 1988 is an Act of the Parliament of India to revise the previously enacted National Forest Policy of 1952. The 1988 National Forest Policy strongly suggested the idea of empowering and involving local communities in the protection and development of forests. A direct outcome of the National Forest Policy, 1988 was the Joint Forest Management Program (JFM /JFMP) instituted in 1990 by the Government of India. It was started on a pilot project basis in West Bengal as early as 1971, and again in the late 1980s with considerable success.

== History ==
Several legislation in India focused on improving environmental quality since the enactment of the National Forest Policy of 1952. The Indian Parliament passed the Wildlife Protection Act, 1972, Water Act, 1974, Air Act, 1981, the Forest Conservation Act, 1980 and the Environment Protection Act, 1986.
