= State of Uttar Pradesh v. Raj Narain =

1975 election law case

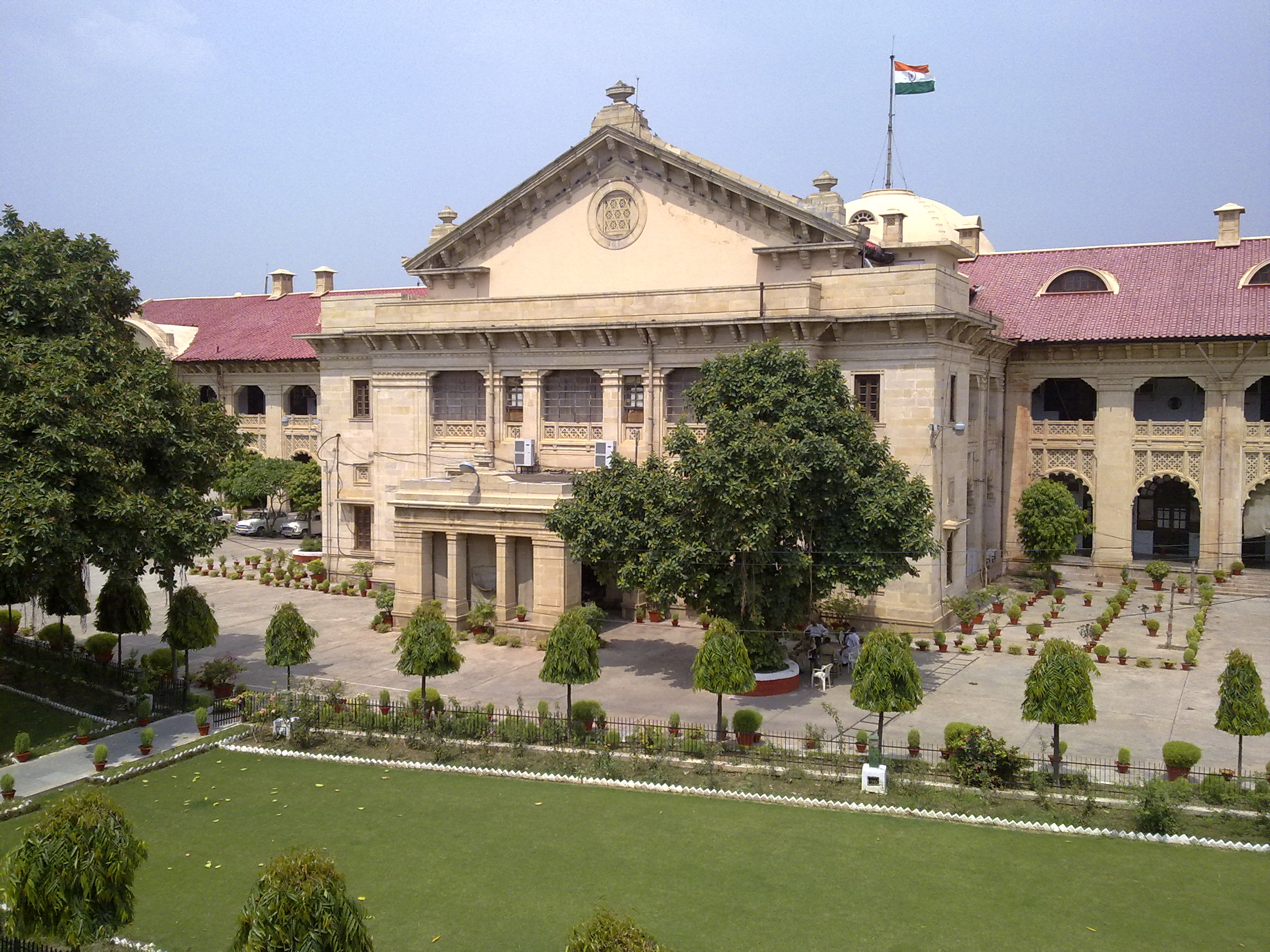
- Court: Allahabad High Court
- Full case name: The State of Uttar Pradesh v. Raj Narain
- Decided: 12 June 1975
- Citation: 1975 AIR 865; 1975 SCR (3) 333

Case history
- Prior actions: Election petition filed under the Representation of the People Act, 1951 by Raj Narain
- Subsequent actions: Appeal to the Supreme Court of India; conviction conditionally stayed on 24 June 1975 and formally overturned on 7 November 1975 in Indira Gandhi v. Raj Narain

Court membership
- Judge sitting: Jagmohanlal Sinha

Case opinions
- Found Prime Minister Indira Gandhi guilty of electoral malpractices, declared her 1971 election null and void and disqualified her for six years.

Laws applied
- Representation of the People Act, 1951 § 123(7)

The State of Uttar Pradesh v. Raj Narain (1975 AIR 865, 1975 SCR (3) 333) was an election case heard by the Allahabad High Court in 1975 that found the Prime Minister of India Indira Gandhi guilty of electoral malpractices. The election petition was filed by Raj Narain, a candidate from the Rae Bareli constituency, who alleged misuse of public finances by a political party for the re-election of the Prime Minister of India. In a landmark verdict, Justice Jagmohanlal Sinha of the court held Indira Gandhi guilty under Section 123(7) of the Representation of the People Act, 1951, for obtaining assistance from gazetted officers in furtherance of her election prospects. The court declared Gandhi's election "null and void" and disqualified her from holding any elected office for six years from the date of the judgment. The decision led to an ensuing legal battle and political crisis leading to the imposition of a state of emergency by Gandhi in 1975.

== Facts ==
Raj Narain had contested the 1971 Indian general election against Indira Gandhi, who represented the constituency of Rae Bareli in the Lok Sabha, the lower house of the Indian Parliament. Gandhi was re-elected from Rae Bareilly by a two-to-one margin of the popular vote, and her Indian National Congress (R) party won a sweeping majority in the Indian Parliament. Narain filed a petition to appeal the verdict, alleging that Indira Gandhi had used bribery, government machinery and resources to gain an unfair advantage in contesting the election. Narain specifically accused Gandhi of using government employees as election agents and of organising campaign activities in the constituency while still on the payroll of the government.

Gandhi was represented by Nanabhoy Palkhivala and Raj Narain by Shanti Bhushan.

== Judgement and aftermath ==
In a landmark verdict on 12 June 1975, Justice Jagmohanlal Sinha found Gandhi guilty of electoral malpractices. The court invalidated Indira Gandhi's election from Rae Bareilly constituency and barred her from contesting another election for six years. While Sinha had dismissed charges of bribery, he had found Indira guilty of misusing government machinery as a government employee herself. The court order gave the Congress (R) twenty days to make arrangements to replace Gandhi in her official posts.

Indira Gandhi, faced with the loss of her parliamentary seat and the post of the Prime Minister, filed an appeal to the Supreme Court of India. The case was heard by Justice V. R. Krishna Iyer, sitting as vacation judge of the Supreme Court. On June 24 1975, Justice Iyer granted only a conditional stay, not the absolute stay as requested by Gandhi's counsel Nani Palkhivala. On 7 November 1975, the Supreme Court of India formally overturned the conviction.

The legal battle and enduring political turmoil eventually led to the fall of Congress regime at the centre after two years in the 1977 Indian general election. Raj Narain became a national hero for overthrowing Gandhi's and the Congress's regime after 30 years of independence, initially by prevailing in the judicial battle and later in 1977 Loksabha elections. This fulfilled an unrealised dream of his friend and mentor Ram Manohar Lohia.

== Significance ==
The Times of India compared the verdict to "firing the Prime Minister for a traffic ticket". The Congress (R) also staged numerous protests across the country in support of Gandhi. However, the verdict galvanized the opposition political parties, who demanded that Indira Gandhi resign from office immediately. Jayaprakash Narayan, the leader of the Janata Morcha, a coalition of opposition political parties, called for a campaign of civil disobedience to oust Indira's government. Dissatisfied with the partial stay of execution, Indira Gandhi declared a state of emergency across the country on June 25, 1975—the very next day after Supreme Court ruling—citing internal and external threats to the country.

Using the sweeping powers granted by the emergency decree, thousands of opposition leaders and activists were arrested, press censorship was introduced and elections were postponed. In protest of the emergency, Palkhivala resigned as Gandhi's lawyer. During this period, Congress (R) used its parliamentary majority to introduce Thirty-ninth Amendment of the Constitution of India, to put the election of the President, the Vice President, the Prime Minister and the Speaker of the Lok Sabha beyond judicial review.

The Emergency lasted until March 1977, during which time elections were postponed, civil liberties were curtailed, and the press was heavily censored. When the government finally called elections in 1977, the opposition Janata Party alliance defeated Gandhi's Congress (R) party. Raj Narain defeated Indira Gandhi in the Rae Bareilly constituency by a margin of 55,200 votes.

== See also ==
- Indira Gandhi v. Raj Narain
