= Mohammad Salimullah v. Union of India =

Indian Supreme Court case on applicability of non-refoulement of Rohingya refugees

- Court: Supreme Court of India
- Full case name: MOHAMMAD SALIMULLAH AND ANR. VERSUS UNION OF INDIA AND ORS.
- Decided: Pending
- Citation: AIR 2021 SUPREME COURT 1789
- Transcript: WP (C) 793/2017 (Interlocutory order)

Court membership
- Judges sitting: Sharad Arvind Bobde, A. S. Bopanna, V. Ramasubramanian JJ

Case opinions
- The rights guaranteed under Articles 14 (equality) and 21 (due process of law) are available to all persons who may or may not be citizens. But the right not to be deported, is ancillary or concomitant to the right to reside or settle in any part of the territory of India guaranteed under Article 19(1)(e)

Keywords
- Non-refoulement; Deportation; Refugee law

Mohammad Salimullah v. Union of India (Writ Petition (Civil) 793 of 2017), is a petition challenging the deportation of Rohingya Muslims who had taken refuge in India to escape persecution in Myanmar. The court however, in an interim order rejected any relief and allowed their deportation subject to proper procedure being followed.

== Background ==
In 2017, Indian government sources estimated that around 40,000 Rohingya Muslims were living in different parts of the country, having entered India illegally and around 10,000 were in Jammu & Kashmir. Petitioners Mohammad Salimullah and Mohammad Shaqir, sought interim relief against the deportation of these people and also sought the release of over 150 Rohingya refugees reportedly detained in a Jammu jail.

== Significance ==
The petitioners argued that deportation by the Indian government would violate the rights guaranteed under Articles 14 (Right to Equality) and Article 21 (Right to Life and Personal Liberty) of the Indian Constitution, which are available to all persons. The court however observed that, "the right not to be deported, is ancillary or concomitant to the right to reside or settle in any part of the territory of India guaranteed under Article 19(1)(e)", and that such a right is only available to its citizens. The court also argued that since India is not a signatory to UN Convention on the Status of Refugees 1951 or its 1967 Protocol, the principle of Non-refoulement does not apply to it.

== Criticism ==
Some experts have contended that non-refoulement is a rule of customary international law i.e. it is a peremptory norm. Also, since no legislation has specifically been passed for matters concerning refugees in India, no distinction is made between an illegal immigrant and a refugee.
