= Eco-Sensitive Zone =

Protected areas in India

Eco-Sensitive Zones (ESZs) or Ecologically Fragile Areas (EFAs) are areas in India notified by the Ministry of Environment, Forests and Climate Change (MoEFCC), Government of India around Protected Areas, National Parks and Wildlife Sanctuaries. The purpose of declaring ESZs is to create buffer zones for the protected areas by regulating and managing the activities around such areas. They also act as a transition zone from areas of high protection to areas involving lesser protection. As per the National Wildlife Action Plan (2002-2016), issued by the Union Ministry of Environment, Forest and Climate Change, land within 10 km of the boundaries of national parks and wildlife sanctuaries is to be notified as eco-fragile zones or Eco-sensitive Zones.

== Authority ==
ESZs are regulated by central government through the Min. of Environment, Forests and Climate change (MoEFCC). The Ministry came out with new guidelines for the regulation of such areas in 2011.

== Statutory backing ==
The Environment (Protection) Act, 1986 does not mention the word "Eco-Sensitive Zones". However, Section 3(2)(v) of the Act, says that Central Government can restrict areas in which any industries, operations or processes or class of industries, operations or processes shall not be carried out or shall be carried out subject to certain safeguards. Besides Rule 5(1) of the Environment (Protection) Rules, 1986 states that central government can prohibit or restrict the location of industries and carrying on certain operations or processes on the basis of considerations like the biological diversity of an area, maximum allowable limits of concentration of pollutants for an area, environmentally compatible land use, and proximity to protected areas. The above two clauses have been effectively used by the government to declare ESZs or EFAs.

The same criteria have been used by the government to declare No Development Zones. Time to time, the Ministry of Environment, Forests and Climate Change (MoEFCC) approves a comprehensive set of guidelines laying down parameters and criteria for declaring ESZs. A committee constituted by MoEF puts this together. The guidelines lay out the criteria based on which areas can be declared as ESZs. These include Species Based (Endemism, Rarity etc.), Ecosystem Based (sacred groves, frontier forests etc.) and Geo-morphologic feature based (uninhabited islands, origins of rivers etc.).

== Background ==
- 21 January 2002 : Wildlife Conservation Strategy - 2002 was adopted in the meeting of National Board for Wildlife, wherein it was envisaged that "lands falling within 10 kilometres of the boundaries of National Parks and Sanctuaries should be notified as eco-fragile zones under Section 3(v) of the Environment (Protection) Act, 1986 and Rule 5 of the Environment Protection Rules, 1986."
- 6 February 2002 : The Additional Director General of Forests requested all the Chief Wildlife Wardens for listing out such areas within 10 kilometres of the boundaries of the National Parks and Sanctuaries and furnish detailed proposals for their notification as Eco-Sensitive areas under the above-mentioned Act.
- In response, only a few States Governments had concerned over applicability of the 10 kilometres range from the Protected Area Boundary and informed that most of the human habitation and other areas including important cities in these States would come under the purview of Eco-Sensitive Zone and will adversely affect the development.
- The National Wildlife Action Plan (2002-2016) indicates that "Areas outside the protected area network are often vital ecological corridor links and must be protected to prevent isolation of fragments of biodiversity which will not survive in the long run. Land and Water use policies will need to accept the imperative of strictly protecting ecologically fragile habitats and regulating use elsewhere." It also indicates that "All identified areas around Protected Areas and Wildlife Corridors to be declared as ecologically fragile under the Environment (Protection) Act, 1986."
- 17 March 2005 : Considering the constraints communicated by the States, the proposal was re-examined by National Board for Wildlife and it was decided that the 'delineation of eco-sensitive would have to be site specific and relate to regulation, rather than prohibition, of specific activities' and the said decision was communicated to all the State Governments vide letter dated 27 May 2005.
- A Public Interest Litigation was filed by the Goa Foundation before the Hon'ble Supreme Court regarding the issue of declaration of eco-sensitive zones.
- 4 December 2006 : Supreme Court directed the Ministry of Environment & Forests to give a final opportunity to all the States/Union territories to respond to the letter (referred above) and the State Government send their proposals within 4 weeks, to the Ministry.

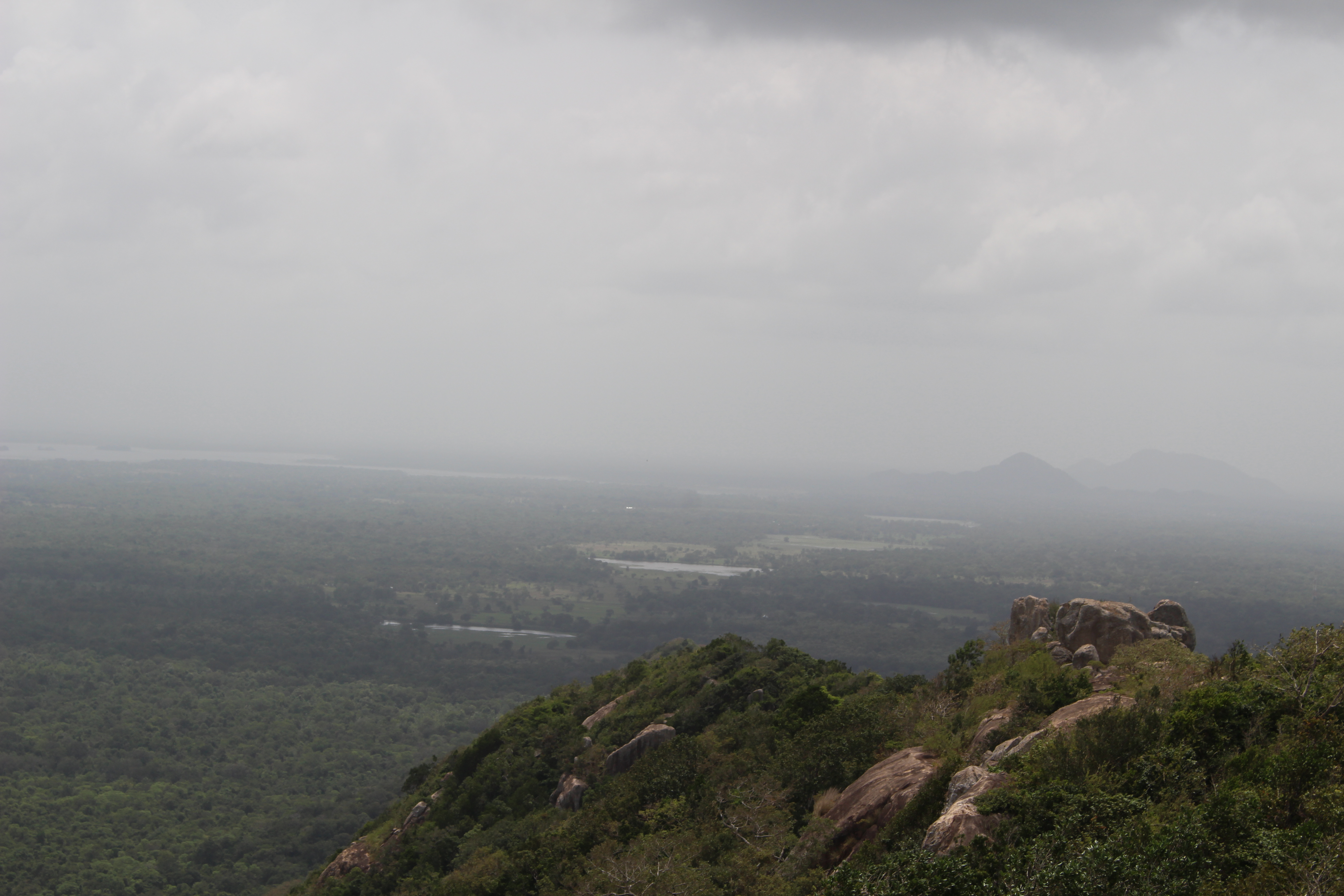

== Need for guidelines ==
- Following the Supreme Court order, only States like Haryana, Gujarat, Mizoram, Meghalaya, Assam, Goa forwarded proposals to the MoEF.
- The Hon'ble Supreme Court of India vide their judgement, in Shri Anand Arya & Anr, T.N. Godavarman Thirumulpad vs Union Of India & Ors on 3 December 2010 relating to the construction of a park at Noida near Okhla Bird Sanctuary, had noted that the State Government of Uttar Pradesh had not declared Eco-Sensitive zones around its protected areas as the Government of India had not issued any guidelines in this regard.
- Thereafter, MoEF set up a committee under the Chairmanship of Shri Pronab Sen for identifying parameters for designating Ecologically Sensitive Areas in India. The parameters identified were richness of flora & fauna, slope, rarity and endemism of species in the area, origins of rivers etc.

== Extent of ESZ ==
An ESZ could go up to 10 kilometres around a protected area as provided in the Wildlife Conservation Strategy, 2002.

Moreover, in case where sensitive corridors, connectivity and ecologically important patches, crucial for landscape linkage, are beyond 10 kilometres width, these should be included in the Eco-Sensitive Zones.

Further, even in the context of a particular Protected Area, the distribution of an area of ESZ and the extent of regulation may not be uniform all around and it could be of variable width and extent.

The Supreme Court of India in June 2022 directed that every protected forest, national park, and wildlife sanctuary across the country should have a mandatory eco-sensitive zone (ESZ) of a minimum of 1 km starting from their demarcated boundaries.

== See also ==
- Ministry of Environment, Forest and Climate Change
- Van Vigyan Kendra
- List of national parks of India
- Wildlife sanctuaries of India
