= ABC v. The State (NCT of Delhi) =

- Court: Supreme Court of India
- Full case name: ABC v. The State (NCT of Delhi)
- Decided: 6 July 2015
- Citation: 2015 SCC OnLine SC 609

Case opinions
- Decision by: Vikramjit Sen

ABC v. The State (NCT of Delhi) is a case decided by a two-judge bench of the Supreme court of India, which held that an unwed woman belonging to the Christian faith can become a legal guardian of her child without the father's consent.

== Facts ==
An unwed woman belonging to the Christian faith (who did not want to be identified) gave birth to a son in the year 2010. She was well-educated, gainfully employed and financially secure and raised her child without any assistance from the child's father. She intended for her son to be her nominee in all her savings and other insurance policies. However, she was informed that for her son to be the nominee, she must either declare the name of the father or get a guardianship/adoption certificate from the Court.

== The Guardian Court ==
Subsequently, the woman filed an application at the Guardian Court to be declared as the sole guardian of her son. The Guardian Court however, informed her that her application could not be processed unless she named the father of the child and gave his whereabouts. She refused to do so. She did, however, file an affidavit stating that if at any time in the future the father of her son raises any objections regarding her son's guardianship, her guardianship could be revoked or altered. She also had published a notice of her application in a daily newspaper Vir Arjun, Delhi Edition. The Guardian Court however, dismissed her application on 19 April 2011, because she declined to disclose the identity or whereabouts of the father of her child.

== Delhi High Court ==
The woman appealed the decision of the Guardian Court to the Delhi High Court, but the High Court dismissed her appeal at the preliminary stage and reasoned that a natural father could have an interest in the welfare and the custody of his child even if there was no marriage. The High Court also reasoned that the woman's allegation, that she was single, could not be established without notifying the father of the application having been filed. The High Court stated the father's presence was necessary for it to decide on the woman's application.

== Supreme Court ==
The woman appealed the decision of the Delhi High Court to the Supreme Court of India, where she argued that there were three reasons for not naming the father: she did not wish to disclose his identity as there was a risk that he would deny paternity as he was already married; she feared that this would affect her child. Secondly, such a revelation might have repercussions on his family considering his marital status. Thirdly, she argued that her fundamental right to privacy would be violated if she was compelled to disclose the father's name.

The State of Delhi opposed her arguments in the Supreme Court, stating that Section 11 of the Guardians and Wards Act, 1890, which applies to Christians in India, requires that a notice must be given to the 'parents' of a child, before a guardian is appointed. Further, the State of Delhi submitted that Section 19 of the same Act stated that a guardian could not be appointed if the father of the child was alive and fit to be appointed a guardian of the child. The State of Delhi submitted that for these reasons the judgement of the High Court was valid.

The Supreme Court felt that the arguments of the State of Delhi and the Delhi High Court judgement had lost sight of an essential feature of the Guardians and Wards Act, 1890, contained in Section 7 of the same Act. The Act is primarily concerned with the welfare of the minor child. With specific reference to children of unwed parents, the Supreme Court highlighted the fact that both Hindu and Mohameddan law in India recognised that custody of children of unwed parents was given to the mother. Under Christian law in India as well, the domicile of origin of the child belonging to unwed parents is the country of the child's mother at the time of the child's birth. The Supreme Court observed that when it came to the welfare of the child (of unwed parents), priority, pre-eminence and preference are given to the mother over the father.

The Supreme Court considered the equivalent laws in the United Kingdom, the United States, Ireland, Philippines, New Zealand and South Africa, and concluded that the preponderant was that the unwed mother possesses primary custodial and guardianship rights with regard to her children and that the father is not conferred with an equal position merely by virtue of having fathered the child.
