= Ajay Hasia v. Khalid Mujib =

Supreme Court of India case

Ajay Hasia v Khalid Mujib
- Court: Supreme Court of India
- Full case name: Ajay Hasia and Ors v Khalid Mujib Sehravardi and Ors
- Decided: 1978
- Citation: (1981) 1 SCC 722; AIR 1981 SC 487

Court membership
- Judges sitting: Y. V. Chandrachud (Chief Justice), V. R. Krishna Iyer, P. N. Bhagwati, S. Murtaza Fazal Ali, A. D. Koshal

Case opinions
- If an individual, company, or society is acting as an instrumentality or agency of the government, it can be considered a State for the purposes of Article 12 of the Constitution of India, and a writ can lie against them for violating the Constitution.
- Decision by: P. N. Bhagwati

Ajay Hasia v Khalid Mujib, (1981) 1 SCC 722, was a landmark decision by the Supreme Court of India in which the Court laid down a test to determine whether an individual, corporation, or society was an instrumentality or agency of the government, and therefore whether it could be considered a State for the purposes of Article 12 of the Constitution of India. If a body is 'State' for the purposes of Article 12, a writ can lie against them for violating the Constitution. The judgment of the Court, delivered by Justice P. N. Bhagwati, was largely a summarization of Bhagwati's view in R. D. Shetty v International Airport Authority of India. Ajay Hasia summarized International Airport Authority into a six-factor test to determine whether a body was an instrumentality of agency of the State.

== Judgment ==
Justice P. N. Bhagwati delivered the judgment of the Court. The most influential portion of the judgment is the summarized six-factor test and largely the reason why it is often cited over the International Airport Authority case, a previous judgment by Justice Bhagwati. The six factors were:

1. Whether the share-capital of the corporation is held by the Government
2. Whether the financial assistance of the State meets almost the entire expenditure of the corporation
3. Whether the corporation enjoys a state-conferred or state-protected monopoly status
4. Whether there is deep and pervasive state control
5. Whether the functions of the corporation are of public importance and closely related to Governmental functions
6. Whether a department of Government has been transferred to a corporation
