= Sarla Mudgal and Others v. Union of India =

1995 Supreme Court of India case

Sarla Mudgal v. Union of India
- Court: Supreme Court of India
- Full case name: Sarla Mudgal and Ors. v. Union of India
- Decided: 11 May 1995
- Citation: AIR 1995 SC 1531

Case opinions
- Decision by: Kuldip Singh

Sarla Mudgal v. Union Of India is a Supreme Court of India case. Its judgement in 1995 laid down the principles against the practice of solemnizing second marriage by conversion to Islam, with first marriage not being dissolved. The verdict discusses issue of bigamy, the conflict between the personal laws existing on matters of marriage and invokes Section 494 of Indian Penal Code, 1860. It is considered a landmark decision that highlighted the need for a uniform civil code.

== Facts ==
In the Sarla Mudgal v. Union of India, there were two main petitioners. The first was Kalyani, a NGO that works with needy and distressed women, which is headed by Sarla Mudgal. The next petitioner was Meena Mathur, married to Jitender Mathur. In 1988, Meena finds that Jitender converted to Islam and solemnized second marriage with Sunita Narula, also known as Fathima. Meena Mathur complained that her husband converted to Islam only for the purposes of getting married again and circumvented the provisions of Section 494 of IPC.

In Writ Petition 424 of 1992, Geeta Rani, married to Pradeep Kumar alleged physical and mental violence by her husband. She later found out that her husband, Pradeep, eloped and married another woman after converting to Islam, in 1991. Sushmita Ghosh, petitioner in Civil Writ Petition 509 of 1992 married G. C. Ghosh according to Hindu rituals in 1984. The husband told her that she wanted a divorce and the petitioner argued that she was the legally wedded wife. The husband embraced Islam and wanted to marry Vinita Gupta. The petitioner has prayed to not let her husband to enter a marriage with Vinita Gupta.

In the case Section 494 of IPC, article 14, 15 20 were discussed in details. The court discussed in detail these two issues:

1. Whether a Hindu husband married under Hindu law is allowed to embrace Islam and then indulge into a marriage with another women?
2. Whether the husband can be charged under 494 of IPC?

== Judgement ==
The Court held that the first marriage would have to be dissolved under the Hindu Marriage Act, 1955. The man's first marriage would therefore, still be valid and under Hindu law, his second marriage, solemnized after his conversion, would be illegal under Section 494 of the Indian Penal Code, 1860.

The Sarla Mudgal judgment has issued no directions for the implementations of Uniform Civil Code, though Justice Kuldeep Singh has requested the government to look at the Article 44 of the Constitution.

== Significance ==
Sarla Mudgal judgment was hailed as precedent for Uniform Civil Code, and cited various cases where personal laws of different religions have come in conflict. The second marriage of Hindu Husband was considered void under Section 494 of IPC, in the judgement the judge gets into detailed examination of the case, Justice Kuldip Singh, while delivering the judgment remarked, "When more than 80% of the citizens have already been brought under the codified personal law there is no justification whatsoever to keep in abeyance, any more, the introduction of "uniform civil code" for all citizens in the territory of India." There was an appeal to the government to have a re-look at Article 44 of Indian Constitution, which suggest Uniform civil code for the citizens.

It was submitted by Mr. Yusuf Muchala, senior advocate, appearing for the All-India Muslim Personal Law Board and also by the advocate of the Jamiat Ulema Hind that the Sarla Mudgal Judgment would render the status of the second wife as that of a concubine and children born of that wedlock as illegitimate to this the Honb’le judges have held this issue is not involved in the present case. What we are considering is the effect of second marriage via the first marriage which subsists in spite of conversion of the husband to Islam, for the limited purpose of ascertaining his criminal liability under Section 17 of the H.M. Act read with Section 494 IPC. As and when this question is raised, it would be open to the parties to agitate the legitimacy of such wife and children and their rights in appropriate proceedings or forum.

== See also ==
- Supreme Court of India
