= Yashpal Kapur =

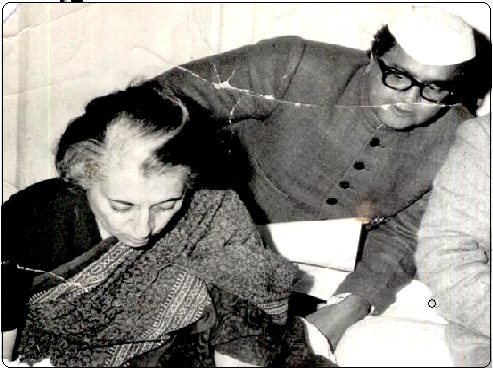
Yashpal Kapoor with Smt. Indira Gandhi

Yashpal Kapoor / Kapur (1929–1993) was a leader of Indian National Congress and a close aide of Indira Gandhi. He was a member of the Rajya Sabha from Uttar Pradesh from 1972 to 1978.
