= Om Prakash v. State of Uttar Pradesh =

Om Prakash v. State Of Uttar Pradesh
- Court: Supreme Court of India
- Full case name: Om Prakash v. State of Uttar Pradesh
- Decided: 11 May 2006
- Citation: Appeal (Crl.) No. 629 of 2006

Case opinions
- Decision by: Arijit Payasat

Om Prakash v. State of U.P is a landmark case decided by a two-judge bench of the Supreme court of India, which held that committing a rape on a woman "knowing her to be pregnant" is only convictable if it is proven that she is pregnant, otherwise the accused would be convicted for rape only.

== Facts ==
The victim's name was not revealed as Section 228-A of Indian Penal Code regards identifying victims of rape to be a punishable offence. The husband of the victim was arrested the day before the crime occurred and was brought before the court for challan proceedings on the day of crime. There, the accused tried to rape her. She raised alarm and the accused was assaulted by people around, arrested and taken to a police station where an FIR was lodged. The trial and the High Court convicted the accused particularly based on the statement of the victim and the eyewitnesses and a sentence of ten years was awarded under section 376 (2) (e) for raping a pregnant woman. Section 376 (2) (e) of Indian Penal Code states that a police officer is liable to be imprisoned for 10 years if the rape victim is a pregnant woman. While Section 376 (1) of Indian Penal Code states that a police officer committing a similar crime is liable for 7 years or less in special cases. At the Supreme court, the accused's sentence of ten years was reduced to seven years citing the reasons that the victim was not proven to be pregnant.

== Judgment ==
The State of U.P, victim side could not show proper evidence that the victim was pregnant at the time of crime and that the accused had an awareness of her being pregnant. Instead of Section 376(2)(e) IPC, Section 376(1) IPC was applied in this case and the sentence of ten years was reduced to 7 years.

== See also ==
- Pregnancy from rape
- Supreme Court of India
