= M. C. Mehta =

Indian public interest attorney

Mahesh Chandra Mehta
- Occupation: Public interest attorney
- Awards: Goldman Environmental Prize (1996); Ramon Magsaysay Award (1997); Padma Shri (2016)

Mahesh Chandra Mehta is a public interest attorney from India. He single-handedly won numerous landmark judgments from India's Supreme Court since 1984, including introducing lead-free gasoline to India and reducing the industrial pollution fouling the Ganga and eroding the Taj Mahal. He was awarded the Goldman Environmental Prize in 1996 for his continuous fights in Indian courts against pollution-causing industries.

He received the Ramon Magsaysay Award for Asia for Public Service in 1997. The Government of India awarded him the civilian honour of the Padma Shri in 2016. He is a trustee of People for Animals.
