= Forest Conservation Act, 1980 =

Act of the Parliament of India

Forest (Conservation) Act, 1980

Parliament of India
- Long title: An Act to provide for the conservation of forests and for matters connected there with or ancillary or incidental thereto.
- Territorial extent: The whole of India.
- Enacted by: Parliament of India
- Enacted: 25 October 1980
- Status: In force

The Forest (Conservation) Act, 1980 an Act of the Parliament of India to provide for the conservation of forests and for matters connected therewith or ancillary or incidental thereto. It was further amended in 1988. This law extends to the whole of India. It was enacted by Parliament of India to control further deforestation of Forest Areas in India. The act came into force on 25 October 1980. It has five sections.

== History for conservation of forest ==
This act was enacted by Parliament of India on 25 October 1980.

== SECTION ==
Section 1 of the Act explains Short Title, Extent, and the Date of commencement. It states that: (1) This Act may be called the Forest (Conservation) Act, 1980. (2) It extends to the whole of India. (3) It shall be deemed to have come into force on the 25th day of October, 1980.

Section 2 of the act is about the restriction on the State Government for dereservation of forests or use of forest land for non-forest purpose. It prohibits the State Government, except prior permission from central government for issuing orders directing:- (i) that any reserved forest (within the meaning of the expression "reserved forest" in any law for the time being in force in that State) or any portion thereof, shall cease to be reserved; (ii) that any forest land or any portion thereof may be used for any non-forest purpose; (iii) that any forest land or any portion thereof may be assigned by way of lease or otherwise to any private person or to any authority, corporation, agency or any other organisation not owned, managed or controlled by Government; (iv) that any forest land or any portion thereof may be cleared of trees which have grown naturally in that land or portion, for the purpose of using it for reafforestation. As provided in explanation "non-forest purpose" means the breaking up or clearing of any forest land or portion thereof for- (a) the cultivation of tea, coffee, spices, rubber, palms, oil-bearing plants, horticultural crops or medicinal plants; (b) any purpose other than reafforestation; but does not include any work relating or ancillary to conservation, development and management of forests and wildlife, namely, the establishment of check-posts, fire lines, wireless communications and construction of fencing, bridges and culverts, dams, waterholes, trench marks, boundary marks, pipelines or other like purposes.

Section 3 of the Act deals with constitution of Advisory Committee. It gives Central Government the power to constitute a committee of such number of person as it may deem fit to advise the Government with regard to- (i) the grant of approval for the purpose which is prohibited in section of this act; or (ii) any other matter connected with the conservation of forests which may be referred to it by the Central Government.

Section 3A deals with Penalty for contravention of the provisions of the Act. It states that Whoever contravenes or abets the contravention of any of the provisions of Section 2, shall be punishable with simple imprisonment for a period which may extend to fifteen days.

Section 3B deals with cases in which the offence is made by Authorities or Government Departments. In such cases it says that the Head of the Department shall be considered Guilty, although if he proves that it was done without his knowledge or that he exercised all due diligence to prevent the commission of such offence.

Section 4 deals with power to make rules. It states that (1) The Central Government may, by notification in the Official Gazette, makes rules for carrying out the provisions of this Act.

(2) Every rule made under this Act shall be laid, as soon as may be after it is made, before each House of Parliament, while it is in session, for a total period of thirty days which may be comprised in one session or in two or more successive sessions, and if, before the expiry of the session immediately following the session or the successive sessions aforesaid, both Houses agree in making any modification in the rule or both Houses agree that the rule should not be made, the rule shall thereafter have effect only in such modified form or be of no effect, as the case may be; so, however, that any such modification or annulment shall be without prejudice to the validity of anything previously done under that rule.

Section 5 deals with repealing and saving. It states that (1) The Forest (Conservation) Ordinance, 1980 is hereby replaced.

(2) Notwithstanding such repeal, anything done or any action taken under the provisions of the said Ordinance shall be deemed to have been done or taken under the corresponding provisions of this Act.

== 1992 Amendment in the Forest Act ==
In 1992, some amendment was made in the Act which made provisions for allowing some non-forest activities in forests, without cutting trees or limited cutting with prior approval of Central Government. These activities are setting of transmission lines, seismic surveys, exploration, drilling and hydroelectric projects. The last activity involves large scale destruction of forest, for which prior approval of the Central Government is necessary.

== Proposed 2023 Amendments ==
Introduced in March 29th, 2023, the Forest Conservation Amendment Bill, 2023 has proposed the following changes:

(i) exempts certain categories of land from its purview

(ii) expands the gamut of activities that can be carried out on forest land

A Joint Committee of Parliament has reviewed the Bill before it was introduced in the Parliament.
