= Thirty-ninth Amendment of the Constitution of India =

1975 amendment on court jurisdiction

The 39th Amendment of the Constitution of India, enacted on 10 August 1975, placed the election of the President, the Vice President, the Prime Minister and the Speaker of the Lok Sabha beyond the scrutiny of the Indian courts. It was passed during The Emergency of 1975–1977. It was moved by the Congress government headed by Indira Gandhi to preempt a hearing by Supreme Court of India concerning the setting aside of Gandhi's election by the Allahabad High Court, in State of Uttar Pradesh v. Raj Narain, on the grounds of corrupt electoral practices.

== Background ==
Indira Gandhi was accused by Raj Narain for misusing the state machinery during her election.

After that, the Allahabad High court did find her guilty, by virtue of which it dismissed her immediately from the Lok Sabha. The high court also barred her from contesting in future elections for 6 years and demanded her resignation from PM post. Indira Gandhi appealed to the supreme court the same day and her case was accepted. The court granted her bail and allowed her to remain as Prime minister for 6 more months within which the said case would be completed, yet refused to reinstate her as a member of Parliament. Facing certain doom if the case went on in the supreme court as before, Indira Gandhi successfully recommended to the President to declare a state of emergency the next night and began her rule by decree.

During this time, Indira Gandhi pushed for the 39th Amendment Act to secure her position and prevent her removal from Indian politics. She also went ahead bringing about the 42nd Amendment of the Constitution of India act that included clause 4 and 5 of Article 368, removing all restriction regarding the amendment power of the parliament and providing that amendments were not contestable in any court of law in India.

Later on in the Indira Gandhi v. Raj Narain case, the 39th amendment was removed and the Doctrine of Basic Structure was reinforced from the Kesavananda Bharati v. State of Kerala case.

== Features ==
The 39th amendement had three principal features.

- It substituted existing Article 71 with a new Article 71 that states that "subject to the provisions of the Constitution, Parliament may by law regulate any matter relating to or connected with the election of a President or Vice-President including the grounds on which such election may be questioned."
- Created new Article 329A with six clauses.
- Inserted new entries nos. 87 – 127 in the Ninth Schedule to the Constitution after Entry 86 and before the explanation.
