= Environment Protection Act, 1986 =

Bhopal Gas Tragedy and Aftermath

Parliament of India
- Enacted by: Parliament of India
- Commenced: 9 January 1986
- Status: In force

The Environment Protection Act, 1986 is an Act of the Parliament of India. It was enacted in May 1986 and came into force on 19 November 1986. It has 26 sections and 4 chapters. The Act is widely considered to have been a response to the Bhopal gas leak. The Act was passed by the Government of India under the Article 253 of the Constitution of India, which empowers to union government to enact laws to give effect to international agreements signed by the country. The purpose of the Act is to implement the decisions of the United Nations Conference on the Human Environment. They relate to the protection and improvement of the human environment and the prevention of hazards to human beings, other living creatures, plants and property. The Act is an “umbrella” legislation that has provided a framework for the environmental regulation regime in India, which covers all major industrial and infrastructure activities and prohibits and regulates specific activities in coastal areas and eco-sensitive areas. The Act also provides for coordination of the activities of various central and state authorities established under other environment-related laws, such as the Water Act and the Air Act.

== History ==
This act was enacted by the Parliament of India in 1986. As the introduction says, "An Act to provide for the protection and improvement of environment and for matters connected therewith: Where as the decisions were taken at the United Nations Conference on the Human Environment held at Stockholm in June 1972, in which India participated, to take appropriate steps for the protection and improvement of human environment. Where as it is considered necessary further to implement the decisions aforesaid in so far as they relate to the protection and improvement of environment and the prevention of hazards to human beings, other living creatures, plants and property". This was due to Bhopal Gas Tragedy which was considered as the worst industrial tragedy in India. Due to the gaps in legislation regarding certain environmental issues there became a urgent need of new legislation which lead to the creation of this act.

== Sections for environment protection act ==
The act contains four chapters in total, which consist of 26 sections. Each chapter has the intent of setting up laws to protect the environment from future harm.

=== Chapter One ===
Chapter one of the act consists of two preliminary sections.

The first section starts by naming the act, stating it will be called the Environmental Protection Act of 1986^{[1]}. The section then states that the act will extend to the whole country of India. The final part of the section sets up the timeframe for when the act will go into effect^{[1]}. The second section of the chapter sets up definitions regarding terms of the act; these terms include environmental language such as "environment," "environmental pollutant," and "environmental pollution."

=== Chapter Two ===
Chapter Two, "General Powers of Central Government," contains the first six sections.

Section one gives the central government the power to protect and improve the environment. The central government is given the power to take whatever action is deemed necessary to prevent and protect the environment from future environmental pollution.

Section two lays out all the actions that may fall under the necessary actions stated in section one. These actions include the planning and execution of nation wide programs, setting the standard for quality of environment and emission of environmental pollutants, restricting areas for which industry may not be carried out, and setting standards for procedures and safeguards to prevent environmental pollution^{[1]}. Other actions that are granted to the central government in this section include the ability to examine and investigate anything that may lead to environmental pollution and researching and distributing information about environmental pollution.

Section three gives the central government more powers, which they may use at their discretion to protect the environment. These powers include the ability to publish in the Official Gazette to create an authority to carry out the execution and procedures that the central government puts forward.

Section four allows the central government to appoint officers who will be under government supervision. These officers will carry out the standards the government sets.

Section five gives the central government the ability to issue orders or direction. These orders or directions may be to any persons or authority. The directions can include regulations, restrictions, closures, or operational changes to industry.

Section six sets up the rules that the central government must follow when pushing forward the regulations. These rules state that the matter the government is regulating must pertain to the following: the quality of water, air, and soil(काळी माती), the maximum amounts of pollutants in an area, the procedures for safeguarding the environment, the prohibition of hazardous materials, the restricting of land for industry, and the procedures for preventing accidents that may cause environmental harm.

=== Chapter three ===
Chapter three is titled "Prevention, Control and Abatement of Environmental Pollution" and contains section seven through seventeen.

Section seven puts forward the rule that no persons operating industry are allowed to emit or discharge pollutants in excess. The definition of excess would be put in place by the government.

Section eight states that the possession of hazardous substances is barred unless the person in possession complies with safeguards and proper procedure.

Section nine has three parts to it and involves the informing of proper authorities when an excess of environmental pollutants is released. The first part of this states that when an excess of pollutants is expelled, the responsible party must alert the proper authorities. The second part states that upon receiving the information, the authorities must respond as soon as reasonably possible with reactionary measures in order to reduce emissions of environmental pollutants. The third part puts forth that the responsible party for the pollutants will be required to pay any expenses incurred during the response to the pollutants.

Section ten talks about the right of entry and inspection guaranteed by the act. This section has four parts which lay out the rules and boundaries regarding the right of entry. The first part of the section lays out the powers of a person with the right of entry. The first part states that any person empowered by the government will, within reason have the right to enter. The reasons for entering may include the purpose of performing any of the duties the government entrusted in them, for the purpose of determining what actions may be necessary, and for the purpose of examining and testing equipment. The second part requires any person involved in an industry with hazardous materials must assist the person empowered by the government. The third part states that any person who fully or attempts to obstruct a person empowered by the government than that person is guilty of by the rules of this act. The fourth part of the act goes over the legal implications of any search and seizure done under the protection of the act.

Section eleven has four parts that guarantee the right for the government or empowered persons to take samples and do the procedures that follow. The first part states that the government or any officer empowered by the government may take samples of soil, air, water, or any other substance. The second part states that any sample may not be used as evidence unless the third and fourth parts are followed properly. The third part goes over the procedures that the person or persons taking a sample must follow. The fourth part goes over the procedures that must be taken in order to analyze the sample.

Section twelve has two section which gives the central government the ability to establish environmental laboratories. Part one allows the government to either establish or recognize environmental laboratories. The second part allows the government to set up rules for these laboratories to follow.

Section thirteen gives the government the ability to appoint a person or persons to analyze any environmental substance whether that be soil, air, or water.

Section fourteen allows for any reports from governmental analysis to be used as evidence under the power of the act.

Section fifteen has two parts which go over the penalties that fall under the act. The first part states that anyone who is found guilty of failure to abide by the act may be imprisoned for up to five years as well as may incur financial penalties. The second part states that if failure to comply to the rules of the act continues the penalties are subject to increase.

Section sixteen has two parts, which goes over offenses by companies. The first part states that if a company commits an offense under this act, then all persons who are in charge of said company will be considered guilty under the act. The second part continues and explains that any part of the violations that come from any supervisor or director who is not the head of the company will also result in said persons being guilty under the act.

Section seventeen has two parts and goes over the offenses by government departments. The first part states that if a government body commits an offense under this act, then the head of the department will be guilty of violating the act. The second part continues and explains that any part of the violations that come from people outside of the head then those individuals will also be found guilty.

=== Chapter four ===
Chapter four is titled "Miscellaneous" and contains sections eighteen through twenty-six.

Section eighteen states that actions taken in good faith will be under protection. Any action taken under this act will be protected as long as it is in good faith. No prosecution will be taken against a government official's action that is taken within good faith under this act.

Section nineteen goes over cognizance of offenses. The act says that no court will take notice of any offense under this act unless given notice by the central government or by notice of a person of an alleged offense.

Section twenty goes over the right to request information under the act. The central government may require persons or offices to give them any information or statistics they deem needed under the act, and the person is bound to do so.

Section twenty-one states that under section three, any person put into service by the central government will be considered a public servant.

Section twenty-two states that no civil court will have jurisdiction over any action taken under this act. The actions include both actions by the central government as well as actions done by officers.

Section twenty-three guarantees the right to delegate which allows the central government under section three to delegate the powers given under this act to other persons.

Section twenty-four has two parts that go over the effect of the laws. Part one states that all laws and rules under this act will be in effect. Part two states that any person who commits an action that violates this act will be liable.

Section twenty-five gives the central government the power to make rules for carrying out the goals of this act. The section also goes over the reasons why rules may be allowed to be made.

Section twenty-six states how the rules created will go into place. Every rule made under this act must be brought in front of parliament. The rule will go into effect once it has been approved.

== Restricted areas ==
The areas on which restriction has been imposed by this act include Doon Valley in Uttarakhand, Aravali Regions in Alwar, Rajasthan, Coastal zones and ecologically sensitive zones, etc.

== See also ==
- Air (Prevention and Control of Pollution) Act, 1981
- Forest Conservation Act, 1980
- Wildlife Protection Act, 1972
- Water Act, 1974
