= The Emergency (India) =

1975–1977 state of emergency

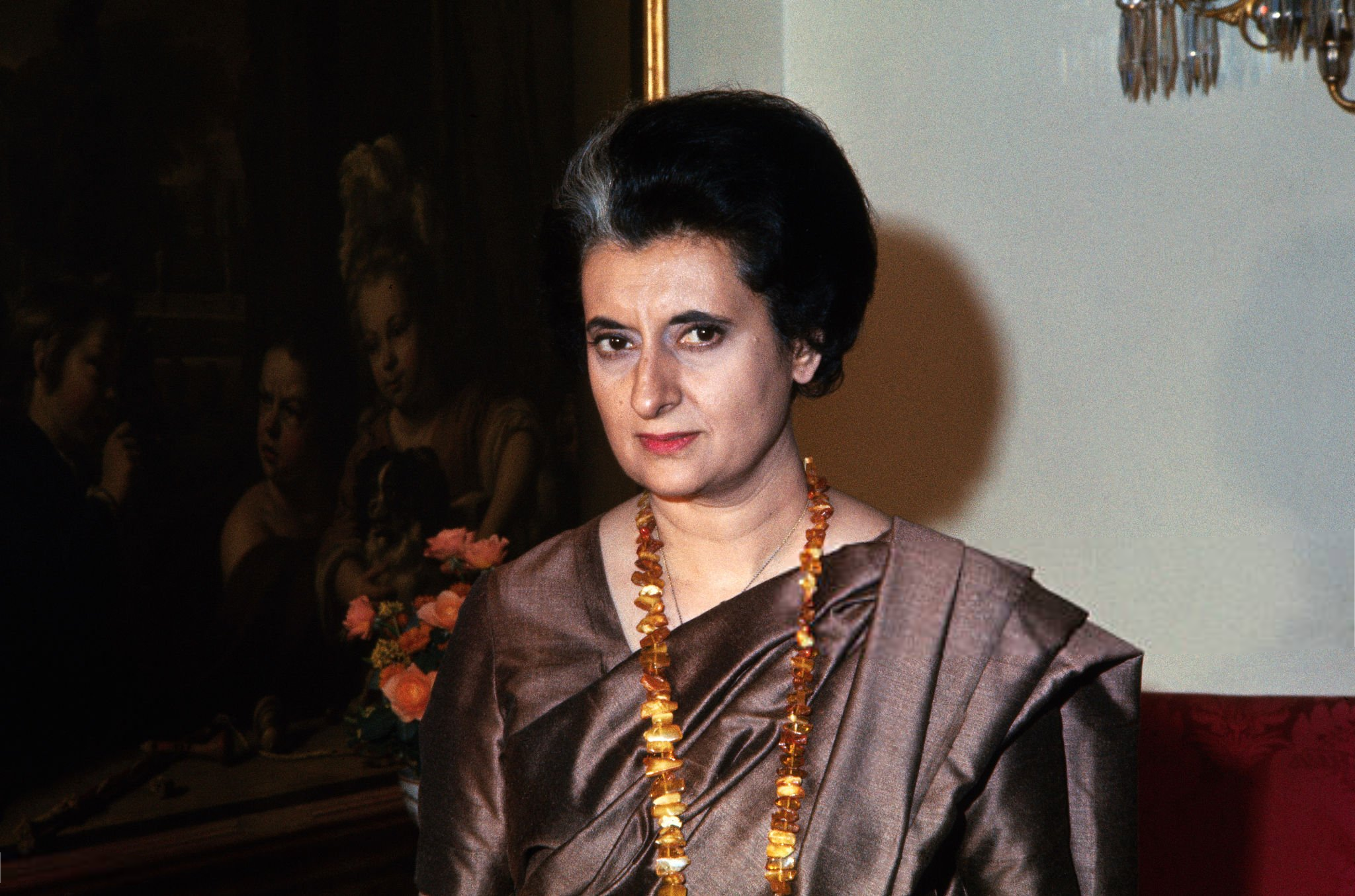
- On the advice of Prime Minister Indira Gandhi, President Fakhruddin Ali Ahmed proclaimed a state of national emergency on 25 June 1975.
- Date: 25 June 1975 – 21 March 1977
- Location: India
- Type: State of Emergency
- Cause: Internal and external threats to the country
- Arrests: 110,806

The Emergency in India was a 21 month period from 1975 to 1977 when prime minister Indira Gandhi declared a state of emergency across India by citing internal and external threats to the country.

Officially issued by president Fakhruddin Ali Ahmed under Article 352 of the Constitution of India because of a prevailing "Internal Disturbance", the Emergency were in effect from 25 June 1975 and ended on 21 March 1977. The order bestowed upon the prime minister the authority to rule by decree, allowing elections to be cancelled and civil liberties to be suspended. For much of the Emergency, most of Gandhi's political opponents were imprisoned and the press was censored. More than 100,000 political opponents, journalists and dissenters were imprisoned. During this time, a mass campaign for vasectomy was spearheaded by her son Sanjay Gandhi.

The final decision to impose an emergency was proposed by Indira Gandhi, agreed upon by the President of India, and ratified by the Cabinet and the Parliament from July to August 1975. It was based on the rationale that there were imminent internal and external threats to the Indian state.

== Prelude ==
=== Rise of Indira Gandhi ===
Between 1967 and 1971, Prime Minister Indira Gandhi came to obtain near-absolute control over the government and the Indian National Congress party, as well as a huge majority in Parliament. The first was achieved by concentrating the central government's power within the Prime Minister's Secretariat, rather than the Cabinet, whose elected members she saw as a threat and distrusted. For this, she relied on her principal secretary, P. N. Haksar, a central figure in Indira's inner circle of advisors. Further, Haksar promoted the idea of a "committed bureaucracy" that required hitherto-impartial government officials to be "committed" to the ideology of the Congress.

Within the Congress, Indira outmaneuvered her rivals, forcing the party to split in 1969—into the Congress (O) (comprising the old-guard known as the "Syndicate") and her Congress (R). A majority of the All-India Congress Committee and Congress MPs sided with the prime minister. Indira's party was of a different breed from the Congress of old, which had been a robust institution with traditions of internal democracy. In the Congress (R), on the other hand, members quickly realised that their progress within the ranks depended solely on their loyalty to Indira Gandhi and her family, and ostentatious displays of sycophancy became routine. In the coming years, Indira's influence was such that she could install hand-picked loyalists as chief ministers of states, rather than their being elected by the Congress legislative party.

Indira's ascent was backed by her charismatic appeal among the masses that was aided by her government's near-radical leftward turns. These included the July 1969 nationalisation of several major banks and the September 1970 abolition of the privy purse; these changes were often done suddenly, via ordinance, to the shock of her opponents. She had strong support in the disadvantaged sections—the poor, Dalits, women and minorities. Indira was seen as "standing for socialism in economics and secularism in matters of religion, as being pro-poor and for the development of the nation as a whole."

In the 1971 general elections, the people rallied behind Indira's populist slogan of Garibi Hatao! (Abolish poverty!) to award her a huge majority (352 seats out of 518). "By the margin of its victory," historian Ramachandra Guha later wrote, Congress (R) came to be known as the real Congress, "requiring no qualifying suffix." In December 1971, under her proactive war leadership, India routed Pakistan in a war that led to the independence of Bangladesh, formerly East Pakistan. Awarded the Bharat Ratna the next month, she was at her greatest peak; for her biographer Inder Malhotra, "The Economist's description of her as the 'Empress of India' seemed apt." Even opposition leaders, who routinely accused her of being a dictator and of fostering a personality cult, referred to her as Durga, a Hindu goddess.

=== Increasing government control of the judiciary ===
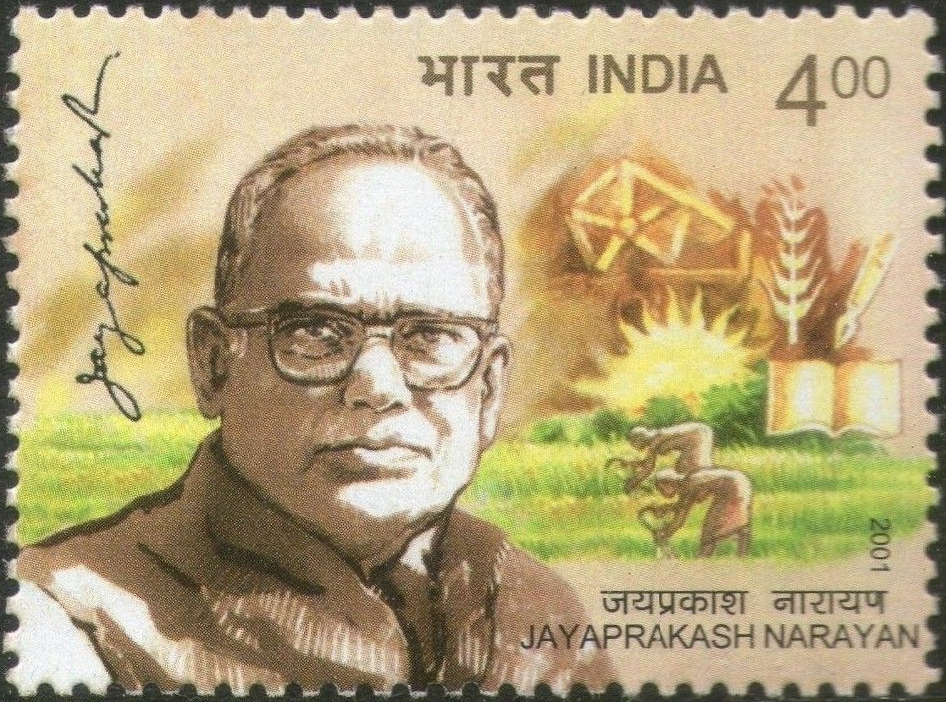
Jayaprakash Narayan on a 2001 stamp of India. He is remembered for leading the mid-1970s opposition against Prime Minister Indira Gandhi and the Indian Emergency, for whose overthrow he had called for a "total revolution".

In 1967's Golaknath case, the Supreme Court said that the Constitution could not be amended by Parliament if the changes affect basic issues such as fundamental rights. To nullify this judgement, Parliament, dominated by the Gandhi-led Congress, passed the 24th Amendment in 1971. Similarly, after the government lost a Supreme Court case for withdrawing the privy purse given to erstwhile princes, Parliament passed the 26th Amendment. This gave constitutional validity to the government's abolition of the privy purse and nullified the Supreme Court's order.

This judiciary–executive battle would continue in the landmark Kesavananda Bharati Case, where the 24th Amendment was called into question. With a wafer-thin majority of 7 to 6, the bench of the Supreme Court restricted Parliament's amendment power by stating it could not be used to alter the "basic structure" of the Constitution. Subsequently, Prime Minister Gandhi made A. N. Ray—the senior-most judge amongst those in the minority in Kesavananda Bharati—Chief Justice of India. Ray superseded three judges more senior to him—J. M. Shelat, K. S. Hegde and Grover—all members of the majority in Kesavananda Bharati. Indira Gandhi's tendency to control the judiciary met with severe criticism, both from the press and political opponents such as Jayaprakash Narayan ("JP").

=== Political unrest ===
This led some Congress party leaders to demand a move towards a presidential system emergency declaration with a more powerful directly elected executive. The most significant of the initial such movement was the Nav Nirman movement in Gujarat, between December 1973 and March 1974. Student unrest against the state's education minister ultimately forced the central government to dissolve the state legislature, leading to the resignation of the chief minister, Rakshit Gautam, and the imposition of President's rule. Meanwhile, there were assassination attempts on public leaders as well as the assassination of the Railway Minister Lalit Narayan Mishra by a bomb. All of these indicated a growing law and order problem in the entire country, which Gandhi's advisors warned her of for months.

In March–April 1974, a student agitation by the Bihar Chatra Sangharsh Samiti received the support of Gandhian socialist Jayaprakash Narayan, referred to as JP, against the Bihar government. In April 1974, in Patna, JP called for "total revolution," asking students, peasants, and labour unions to non-violently transform Indian society. He also demanded the dissolution of the state government, but this was not accepted by the center. A month later, the railway-employees union, the largest union in the country, went on a nationwide railways strike. This strike was led by the firebrand trade union leader George Fernandes who was the President of the All India Railwaymen's Federation. He was also the President of the Socialist Party. The strike was brutally suppressed by the Indira Gandhi government, which arrested thousands of employees and drove their families out of their quarters.

In his speech, Narayan announced his decision to form "Lok Sangarsh Samiti" committee with Morarji Desai as its head and Nanaji Deshmukh as its secretary. The committee aimed to surround the Prime Minister's house and refuse anybody's entry in order to paralyze the functioning of government. The committee further asked people to obstruct the railway lines so that the trains could not move and to prevent the functioning of courts and government offices.

=== Raj Narain verdict ===
Raj Narain, who had been defeated in the 1971 parliamentary election by Indira Gandhi, lodged cases of election fraud and use of state machinery for election purposes against her in the Allahabad High Court. Shanti Bhushan fought the case for Narain (Nani Palkhivala fought the case for Gandhi). Indira Gandhi was also cross-examined in the High Court, which was the first such instance for an Indian Prime Minister (Indira Gandhi had to present herself for 5 hours in front of the judge).

On 12 June 1975, Justice Jagmohanlal Sinha of the Allahabad High Court found the prime minister guilty on the charge of misuse of government machinery for her election campaign. The court declared her election null and void and unseated her from her seat in the Lok Sabha. The court also banned her from contesting any election for an additional six years. Serious charges, such as bribing voters and election malpractices were dropped, but she was held responsible for misusing government machinery and was found guilty on charges such as using the state police to build a dais, availing herself of the services of a government officer, Yashpal Kapoor, during the elections before he had resigned from his position, and use of electricity from the state electricity department.

Her supporters organized mass pro-Indira demonstrations in the streets of Delhi close to the Prime Minister's residence.

Indira Gandhi challenged the High Court's decision in the Supreme Court. Justice V. R. Krishna Iyer, on 24 June 1975, upheld the High Court judgment and ordered all privileges Gandhi received as an MP be stopped, and that she be debarred from voting. However, she was allowed to continue as Prime Minister pending the resolution of her appeal. Jayaprakash Narayan and Morarji Desai called for daily anti-government protests. The next day, Jayaprakash Narayan organized a large rally in Delhi, where he said that a police officer must reject the orders of the government if the order is immoral and unethical as this was Mahatma Gandhi's motto during the freedom struggle. Such a statement was taken as a sign of inciting rebellion in the country. Later that day, Indira Gandhi requested a compliant President Fakhruddin Ali Ahmed to proclaim a state of emergency. Within three hours, the electricity to all major newspapers was cut and the political opposition was arrested. The proposal was sent without discussion with the Union Cabinet, who only learned of it and ratified it the next morning.

=== Preventive detention laws ===
Before the emergency, the Indira Gandhi government passed draconian laws that would be used to arrest political opponents before and during the emergency. One of these was the Maintenance of Internal Security Act (MISA), 1971, which was passed in May 1971 despite criticism from prominent opposition figures across partisan lines such as CPI(M)'s Jyotirmoy Basu, Jana Sangh's Atal Bihari Vajpayee, and the Anglo-Indian nominated MP Frank Anthony. The Indira government also renewed the Defence of India rules, which was withdrawn in 1967. Defence of India rules were given an expanded mandate 5 days into the emergency and renamed as Defence and Internal Security of India Rules. Another law, Conservation of Foreign Exchange and Prevention of Smuggling Activities Act passed in December 1974, was also frequently used to target political opponents.

== Proclamation of the Emergency ==
The Government cited threats to national security, as a war with Pakistan had recently been concluded. Due to the recent war, the onset of drought and the 1973 oil crisis, the economy was in poor condition. The Government claimed that the strikes and protests had paralyzed the government and hurt the economy of the country greatly. In the face of massive political opposition, desertion, and disorder across the country and the party, Gandhi stuck to the advice of a few loyalists and her younger son Sanjay Gandhi, whose own power had grown considerably over the last few years to become an "extra-constitutional authority". Siddhartha Shankar Ray, the Chief Minister of West Bengal, proposed to the prime minister to impose an "internal emergency". He drafted a letter for the President to issue the proclamation based on information Indira had received that "there is an imminent danger to the security of India being threatened by internal disturbances". He showed how democratic freedom could be suspended while remaining within the ambit of the Constitution.

After resolving a procedural matter, President Fakhruddin Ali Ahmed declared a state of internal emergency upon the prime minister's advice on the night of 25 June 1975, just a few minutes before the clock struck midnight.

As the constitution requires, Gandhi advised and President Ahmed approved the continuation of the Emergency over every six months until she decided to hold elections in 1977. In 1976, Parliament voted to delay elections, something it could only do with the Constitution suspended by the Emergency.

== Administration ==
Indira Gandhi devised a '20-point' economic program to increase agricultural and industrial production, improve public services and fight poverty and illiteracy, through "the discipline of the graveyard". In addition to the official twenty points, Sanjay Gandhi declared his five-point programme promoting literacy, family planning, tree planting, the eradication of casteism and the abolition of dowries. Later during the Emergency, the two projects merged into a twenty-five-point programme. In 2013, a report by WikiLeaks noted that the Central Intelligence Agency (CIA) had gained a source in Indira Gandhi's household between 1975 and 1977. However, the CIA did not expect the declaration of the Emergency.

=== Arrests ===
Invoking articles 352 and 356 of the Indian Constitution, Indira Gandhi granted herself extraordinary powers and launched a massive crackdown on civil rights and political opposition. The Government used police forces across the country to place thousands of protestors and strike leaders under preventive detention. Vijayaraje Scindia, Jayaprakash Narayan, Mulayam Singh Yadav, Raj Narain, Morarji Desai, Charan Singh, Jivatram Kripalani, George Fernandes, Anantram Jaiswal, Atal Bihari Vajpayee, Lal Krishna Advani, Arun Jaitley, Jai Kishan Gupta Satyendra Narayan Sinha, Gayatri Devi (the queen of Jaipur), and other protest leaders were immediately arrested. Organisations like the Rashtriya Swayamsevak Sangh (RSS) and Jamaat-e-Islami, along with some political parties, were banned. CPI(M) leaders V.S. Achuthanandan and Jyotirmoy Basu were arrested along with many others involved with their party. Congress leaders who dissented against the Emergency declaration and amendment to the constitution, such as Mohan Dharia and Chandra Shekhar, resigned from their government and party positions and were thereafter arrested and placed under detention. Members of regional opposition parties such as DMK also found themselves arrested.

Most of these arrests happened under laws such as MISA, DISIR, and COFEPOSA. During the emergency, 34,988 people were arrested under MISA, and 75,818 people were arrested under DISIR. This included both political prisoners and ordinary criminals. Most states classified those arrested under MISA into multiple categories. For instance in Andhra Pradesh they were classified into three categories- Class A, Class B, and Class C. Class A prisoners included prominent political leaders, members of parliament, and members of the legislative assembly. Class B prisoners included less prominent political prisoners. Class C included those detained for "economic offences" and other offences. Class A and B prisoners were treated better and received better amenities in prison than other categories of prisoners. Those arrested under COFEPOSA and DISR, depending on the state, found themselves detained with ordinary criminals, as Class C prisoners, or their own separate category.

=== Laws, human rights and elections ===
Elections for the Parliament and state governments were postponed. Gandhi and her parliamentary majorities could rewrite the nation's laws since her Congress party had the required mandate to do so – a two-thirds majority in the Parliament. And when she felt the existing laws were 'too slow', she got the President to issue 'Ordinances' – a law-making power in times of urgency, invoked sparingly – completely bypassing the Parliament, allowing her to rule by decree. Additionally, she amended the constitution, exonerating her from any culpability in her election-fraud case, imposed President's Rule in Gujarat and Tamil Nadu, where anti-Indira parties had held a majority (state legislatures were thereby dissolved and suspended indefinitely), and jailed thousands of opponents. The 42nd Amendment, which brought about extensive changes to the letter and spirit of the Constitution, is one of the lasting legacies of the Emergency. In the conclusion of his Making of India's Constitution, Justice Khanna writes:

If the Indian constitution is our heritage bequeathed to us by our founding fathers, no less are we, the people of India, the trustees, and custodians of the values which pulsate within its provisions! A constitution is not a parchment of paper, it is a way of life and has to be lived up to. Eternal vigilance is the price of liberty and in the final analysis, its only keepers are the people. The imbecility of men, history teaches us, always invites the impudence of power.

A fallout of the Emergency era was the Supreme Court decision that although the Constitution is amenable to amendments, changes that tinker with its basic structure cannot be made by the Parliament (see Kesavananda Bharati v. State of Kerala).

In the Rajan case, P. Rajan of the Regional Engineering College, Calicut, was arrested by the police in Kerala on 1 March 1976, tortured in custody until he died and then his body was disposed of and was never recovered. The facts of this incident came out owing to a habeas corpus suit filed in the Kerala High Court.

Many cases where teens were arrested and imprisoned have come to light, one such example is of Dilip Sharma who, at age 16, was arrested and imprisoned for over 11 months. He was released based on Patna High Court's judgment on 29 July 1976.

=== Economics ===
Christophe Jaffrelot considers the economic policy of the emergency regime to be corporatist. Five programs in the 20-point program were aimed at benefiting the middle classes and industrialists. They included- liberalising investment procedures, introducing new schemes for workers' associations in the industry, implementing a national permit scheme for road transport, giving tax breaks to the middle class by exempting anyone earning under Rs. 8,000 from income taxes, and an austerity program to reduce public spending.

==== Trade unions and worker's rights ====
The emergency regime cracked down on trade unionism, banned strikes, imposed wage freezes, and phased out wage bonuses. The largest trade unions in the country at the time such as the Congress' INTUC, CPI's AITUC, and Socialist affiliated HMS were made to comply with the new regime, while the CPI(M)'s CITU continued its opposition for which it had 20 of its leaders arrested. State governments were asked to form bipartite councils composed of representatives of the workers and the management for firms having more than 500 employees, similar apex bipartite committees were formed by the centre for major public sector industries, while a National Apex Board was set up for the private industries. These were meant to give a veneer of worker participation in decision making but were in reality stacked in favour of the management, and tasked with increasing "productivity" by cutting holidays (including Sundays), bonuses, agreeing to wage freezes, and allowing layoffs.

Worker demonstrations during the emergency were subject to heavy state repression, such as when the AITUC organised a one-day strike to protest the slashing of bonuses in January 1976, to which the state responded by arresting 30,000-40,000 workers. In another such instance, the 8,000 workers of the Indian Telephone Industries (a Bangalore-based state-owned company) took part in a peaceful sit-in protest in response to the management reneging its promise of a 20% bonus to just 8%, they found themselves lathi-charged by the police who also arrested a few hundred of them.

Coal miners were forced to work in abysmal conditions with irregular pay, collieries were made to run for all seven days a week, and complaints of workers and unions about the abysmal and dangerous working conditions were ignored and met with state repression. These terrible workplace conditions led to the deadliest mining disaster in Indian history on 27 December 1975, at Chasnala coal mine near Dhanbad which claimed the lives of 375 miners due to more than 100 million gallons of water flooding the mine. This was the 222nd such accident that year, the previous incidents having claimed 288 lives.

==== Inflation and price control ====
The emergency government enjoyed a degree of popular support due to lower prices of goods and services at least during 1975. This was due to many reasons such as RBI's policy of putting in place a 6 per cent ceiling on annual money supply growth months before the emergency, record monsoon in the year of 1975 leading to record harvest of foodgrains which led to food prices declining, increased import of grains, and reduced demand due to cutting of worker's wages and bonuses. In addition to this half of the dearness allowance of workers was withheld as part of the Wage Freeze Act as compulsory deposits to combat inflation. However, these reduced prices only lasted till March 1976 when the prices of commodities started to go up again, on account of food grain production declining by 7.9%. Between 1 April and 6 October 1976 the wholesale price index rose by 10%, in which the price of rice rose by 8.3%, groundnut oil rose by 48%, while the prices of industrial raw materials as a group rose by 29.3%.

==== Tax policy ====
The emergency regime exempted those earning between Rs 6,000-8,000 from taxation, provided tax breaks for those earning between Rs 8,000-15,000 in the range of Rs 45-264. There were only 3.8 million (38 lakh) taxpayers in the country at the time. Wealth taxes were also cut from 8% to 2.5% while the income taxes on those earning more than Rs 100,000 were reduced from 77% to 66%. This was expected to lower the government's revenue by Rs 3.08-3.25 billion. To compensate for this indirect taxes grew, and the ratio of indirect taxes to direct taxes was at 5.31 in 1976. Despite this there was a loss in revenue of Rs 400 million (40 crores), and to compensate for this the Indira Gandhi government cut spending in education and social welfare.

=== Forced sterilisation ===
In September 1976, Sanjay Gandhi initiated a widespread compulsory sterilisation program to limit population growth. The exact extent of Sanjay Gandhi's role in the implementation of the program is disputed, with some writers holding Gandhi directly responsible for his authoritarianism, and other writers blaming the officials who implemented the programme rather than Gandhi himself. The United States, United Nations, and World Bank had earlier raised concern over India's population control measures. Rukhsana Sultana was a socialite known for being one of Sanjay Gandhi's close associates and she gained notoriety in leading Sanjay Gandhi's sterilisation campaign in Muslim areas of old Delhi. The campaign primarily involved getting males to undergo vasectomy. Quotas were set up that enthusiastic supporters and government officials worked hard to achieve. There were allegations of coercion of unwilling candidates too. In 1976–1977, the program led to 8.3 million sterilisations, most of them forced, up from 2.7 million the previous year. The bad publicity led many subsequent governments to stress that family planning is entirely voluntary.

- Kartar, a cobbler, was taken to a block development office by six policemen, where he was asked how many children he had. He was forcefully taken for sterilisation in a jeep. En route, the police forced a man on a bicycle into the jeep because he was not sterilised. Kartar had an infection and suffered from pain from the procedure and could not work for months.
- Shahu Ghalake, a peasant from Barsi in Maharashtra, was taken for sterilisation. After mentioning that he was already sterilised, he was beaten. A sterilisation procedure was undertaken on him for a second time.
- Hawa Singh, a young widower from Pipli, was taken from the bus against his will and sterilised. The ensuing infection took his life.
- Harijan, a 70-year-old with no teeth and bad eyesight, was sterilised forcefully.
- Uttawar forced sterilisations: Uttawar, a Haryana village 90 kilometres south of Delhi, woke up to police loudspeakers at 03:00. Police gathered 400 men at the bus stop. In the process of finding more villagers, police broke into homes and looted. A total of 800 forced sterilisations were done.
- In Muzaffarnagar, Uttar Pradesh, on 18 October 1976, police picked up 17 people, of which two were over 75 and two under 18. Hundreds of people surrounded the police station demanding they free captives. The police refused to release them and used tear gas shells. The crowd retaliated by throwing stones, and to control the situation, the police fired on the crowd. 30 people died as a result.

=== Demolitions ===
==== Demolitions in Delhi ====
Delhi served as the epicenter of Sanjay Gandhi's "urban renewal" program, aided in large part by DDA vice-president Jagmohan Malhotra who himself had a desire to "beautify" the city. During the emergency Jagmohan emerged as the single most powerful person in the DDA, and went to extraordinary lengths to do the bidding of Sanjay Gandhi, as the Shah commission notes

Shri Jagmohan during the emergency, became a law unto himself and went about doing the biddings of Shri Sanjay Gandhi without care or concern for the miseries of the people affected thereby

In total, 700,000 people were displaced due to the demolitions carried out in Delhi.

Demolitions carried out in Delhi
Period	Structures Demolished by			
Pre-Emergency	DDA	MCD	NDMC	Total
1973	50	320	5	375
1974	680	354	25	1,059
1975 (up to June)	190	149	27	366
Total	920	823	57	1,800
Emergency				
1975	35,767	4,589	796	41,252
1976	94,652	4,013	408	99,073
1977 (up to 23 March)	7,545	96	—	7,641
Year unspecified but during the emergency	—	1,962	177	2,139
Total	137,964	10,760	1,381	150,105

==== Demolitions outside Delhi ====
During the Emergency, various state governments also carried out demolitions to clear "encroachments", undertaken to please Sanjay Gandhi. In many of these cases, residents were given very short notices, and state governments like those of Bihar and Haryana avoided giving official notices to the residents of "encroachments" to avoid a case in a civil court. Instead, they notified them through public channels, or in the case of Haryana through drum beats. In some cases, they gave no prior information. States passed various laws to aid them in this process such as Maharashtra Vacant Land Act 1975, Bihar Public Encroachment Act 1975, and Madhya Pradesh Land Revenue Code (Amendment) Act. These demolitions were often accompanied by the police to threaten the residents with arrest under MISA or DIR. In Maharashtra, Mumbai alone saw demolitions of 12,000 huts, while Pune saw demolitions of 1285 huts and 29 shops.

== Response ==
=== Democracy Bachao Morcha ===
Shortly after the declaration of the Emergency, the Sikh leadership convened meetings in Amritsar where they resolved to oppose the "fascist tendency of the Congress". The "Democracy Bachao Morcha" (translates to 'Campaign to Save Democracy') was organised by the Akali Dal, led by Harchand Singh Longowal, and launched in Amritsar, 9 July. The Akali Dal was the most successful regional party that opposed the morcha. Over 40,000 Akalis and other Sikhs courted arrest during the morcha. Their statement was:

The question before us is not whether Indira Gandhi should continue to be prime minister or not. The point is whether democracy in this country is to survive or not.

Damdami Taksal and its head at the time, Sant Kartar Singh Bhindranwale, held many protests and marches against the emergency He also held 37 processions which defied the rules of the emergency.

They protested for two years fighting against policemen and curfew was declared in the entire Malwa region. During Emergency SGPC offices used to be flooded with Anti-Emergency activists from RSS and BJP who had taken shelter to escape the government. According to Amnesty International, 140,000 people had been arrested without trial during the twenty months of Gandhi's Emergency. Jagtar Singh Grewal estimates that 43,000 of them came from India's two per cent Sikh minority.

=== Sangh Parivar ===
Rashtriya Swayamsevak Sangh, which was seen close to opposition leaders, was banned. On 22 August 1975, RSS chief Madhukar Dattatraya Deoras wrote a letter to Indira Gandhi, aiming to "dispel misconceptions" regarding the RSS and assured her his organisation was working for Hindus but was never against her government. Deoras also praised the 15th August speech of Gandhi in this letter.

While some of the senior RSS leaders supported the Emergency, others had apologised and were released, and several senior leaders, notably Madhukar Dattatraya Deoras sought an accommodation with Sanjay and Indira Gandhi. Zonal RSS leaders also authorised Eknath Ramakrishna Ranade to quietly enter into a dialogue with Indira Gandhi.

Bharatiya Jana Sangh leader Atal Bihari Vajpayee, who was in poor health, quickly reached an agreement with Indira Gandhi, and spent most of the Emergency under parole at his residence. Bharatiya Jana Sangh members Nanaji Deshmukh and Madan Lal Khurana managed to escape the police and led the resistance.

Arun Jaitley, Student leader and head of the RSS affiliated ABVP (Akhil Bharatiya Vidyarthi Parishad) in Delhi, was among the first to be arrested, and he spent the entire Emergency in jail. However, other ABVP leaders such as Balbir Punj and Prabhu Chawla pledged allegiance to Indira Gandhi's Twenty Point Programme and Sanjay Gandhi's Five Point Programme, in return for staying out of jail.

On 10 August 1976, Subramanian Swamy walked into the parliament and when obituary references were concluding, Swamy raised a point of order that Democracy had also died and Rajya Sabha Chairman had not included it in recent list of deaths. As a result, Swamy was expelled from parliament. In November 1976, over 30 leaders of the RSS, led by Madhavrao Muley, Dattopant Thengadi, and Moropant Pingle, wrote to Indira Gandhi, promising support to the Emergency if all RSS workers were released from prison. Their "Document of Surrender", to take effect from January 1977, was processed by H. Y. Sharada Prasad.

On his return from his meeting with Om Mehta, Vajpayee ordered the cadres of the ABVP to apologise unconditionally to Indira Gandhi. The ABVP students refused. The RSS "Document of Surrender" was also confirmed by Subramanian Swamy in his article: "I must add that not all in the RSS were in a surrender mode ... But a tearful Muley told me in early November 1976 and I had better escape abroad again since the RSS had finalized the Document of Surrender to be signed in end of January 1977, and that on Mr. Vajpayee's insistence I would be sacrificed to appease an irate Indira and a fulminating Sanjay."

=== CPI(M) ===
Members of the Communist Party of India (Marxist) were identified and arrested all over India. Raids were conducted in houses suspected to be sympathetic to the CPI(M) or the opposition to the emergency.

Those jailed during the Emergency include the former general secretary of the CPI(M), Sitaram Yechury, and his predecessor, Prakash Karat. Both were then leaders of the Students Federation of India, the party's student wing.

Other CPI(M) members to be jailed included the future Chief Minister of Kerala, Pinarayi Vijayan, then a young MLA. He was taken into custody during the Emergency and subjected to third-degree methods. On his release, Pinarayi reached the Assembly and made an impassionate speech holding up the blood-stained shirt he wore when in police custody, causing serious embarrassment to the then C. Achutha Menon government.

Hundreds of Communists, whether from the CPI(M), other Marxist parties, or the Naxalites, were arrested during the Emergency. Some were tortured or, as in the case of the Kerala student P. Rajan, killed in the Kakkayam torture camp. A famous torture technique during the time was Uruttal.

== Foreign reactions ==
The United States government disliked but chose to not oppose the Emergency. According to former United States Ambassador Dennis Kux, the Soviet Union "applauded the imposition of the Emergency, labelling Mrs. Gandhi's opponents as right-wing reactionaries". The British government followed the United States in taking a "business as usual" approach.

== Elections of 1977 ==
On 18 January 1977, Gandhi called fresh elections for March and released several opposition leaders; however, many others remained in prison even after she left office, despite the Emergency officially ending on 21 March 1977. The opposition Janata movement's campaign warned Indians that the elections might be their last chance to choose between "democracy and dictatorship".

The Indian general election of 1977 was held from 16 to 20 March, and resulted in a landslide victory for the Janata Party and the CFD, securing 298 seats in the Lok Sabha, whereas the ruling Indian National Congress only managed to win 154—a decrease of 198 as compared to the previous election. Indira Gandhi herself was voted out of office in the Rae Bareli constituency, losing to electoral rival Raj Narain by a margin of over 55,000 votes. INC candidates failed to win a single seat in the constituencies of several northern states, such as Bihar and Uttar Pradesh. The Janata Party's 298 seats were further augmented by an additional 47 seats won by its various political allies, thereby giving them a two-thirds supermajority. Morarji Desai became the first non-Congress Prime Minister of India.

Dhanagare says the structural reasons behind the discontent against the Government included the emergence of the strong and united opposition, disunity and weariness inside Congress, an effective underground opposition, and the ineffectiveness of Gandhi's control of the mass media, which had lost much credibility. The structural factors allowed voters to express their grievances, notably their resentment of the emergency and its authoritarian and repressive policies. One grievance often mentioned was the 'nasbandi' (vasectomy) campaign in rural areas. The middle classes also emphasised the curbing of freedom throughout the state and India. Meanwhile, Congress hit an all-time low in West Bengal because of the poor discipline and factionalism among Congress activists as well as the numerous defections that weakened the party. Opponents emphasised the issues of corruption in Congress and appealed to a deep desire by the voters for fresh leadership.

== Tribunal ==
The efforts of the Janata administration to get government officials and Congress politicians tried for Emergency-era abuses and crimes were largely unsuccessful due to a disorganised, over-complex, and politically motivated process of litigation. The Thirty-eighth Amendment of the Constitution of India, put in place shortly after the outset of the Emergency and which among other things prohibited judicial reviews of states of emergencies and actions taken during them, also likely played a role in this lack of success. Although special tribunals were organised and scores of senior Congress Party and government officials arrested and charged, including Gandhi and Sanjay Gandhi, police were unable to submit sufficient evidence for most cases, and only a few low-level officials were convicted of any abuses.

== Legacy ==
The Emergency lasted 21 months, and its legacy remains controversial. A few days after the Emergency was imposed, the Bombay edition of The Times of India carried an obituary that read, "Democracy, beloved husband of Truth, loving father of Liberty, brother of Faith, Hope and Justice, expired on June 26."

A few days later censorship was imposed on newspapers. The Delhi edition of the Indian Express on 28 June, carried a blank editorial, while the Financial Express reproduced in large type Rabindranath Tagore's poem "Where the mind is without fear".

The Emergency also received support. It was endorsed by social reformer Vinoba Bhave (who called it Anushasan Parva, a time for discipline), industrialist J. R. D. Tata, writer Khushwant Singh, and Indira Gandhi's close friend and Odisha Chief Minister Nandini Satpathy. Tata told a reporter of the Times, "things had gone too far. You can't imagine what we've been through here—strikes, boycotts, demonstrations. Why, there were days I couldn't walk out of my house into the streets. The parliamentary system is not suited to our needs."

In the book JP Movement and the Emergency, historian Bipan Chandra wrote, "Sanjay Gandhi and his cronies like Bansi Lal, Minister of Defence at the time, were keen on postponing elections and prolonging the emergency by several years. In October–November 1976, an effort was made to change the basic civil libertarian structure of the Indian Constitution through the 42nd amendment to it. ... The most important changes were designed to strengthen the executive at the cost of the judiciary, and thus disturb the carefully crafted system of Constitutional checks and balance between the three organs of the government."

After Indira Gandhi's victory in the 1980 elections, political scientist Myron Weiner concluded that Indian politics "returned to normal".

The Third Modi government declared 25 June as Samvidhān Hatyā Diwas (Murder of the Constitution Day).

== Culture ==
=== Literature ===
- Writer Rahi Masoom Raza criticised the Emergency through his novel Qatar bi Aarzoo.
- Shashi Tharoor portrays the Emergency allegorically in his The Great Indian Novel (1989), describing it as "The Siege". He also authored a satirical play on the Emergency, Twenty-Two Months in the Life of a Dog, that was published in his The Five Dollar Smile and Other Stories.
- A Fine Balance and Such a Long Journey by Rohinton Mistry take place during the Emergency and highlight many of the abuses that occurred during that period, largely through the lens of India's small but culturally influential Parsi minority.
- Rich Like Us by Nayantara Sahgal is partly set during the Emergency and deals with themes such as political corruption and oppression in the context of the event.
- Booker Prize-winner Midnight's Children by Salman Rushdie has the protagonist, Saleem Sinai, in India during the Emergency. His home in a low-income area, called the "magician's ghetto", is destroyed as part of the national beautification program. He is forcibly sterilised as part of the vasectomy program. The principal antagonist of the book is "the Widow" (a likeness that Indira Gandhi successfully sued Rushdie for). There was one line in the book that repeated an old Indian rumour that Indira Gandhi's son disliked his mother because he suspected her of causing the death of his father. As this was a rumour, there was no substantiation to be found.
- India: A Wounded Civilization, a book by V. S. Naipaul, is also oriented around The Emergency.
- The Plunge, an English-language novel by Sanjeev Tare, is the story told by four youths studying at Kalidas College in Nagpur. They tell the reader what they went through during those politically turbulent times.
- The Malayalam-language novel Delhi Gadhakal (Tales from Delhi) by M. Mukundan highlights many waves of abuse that occurred during the Emergency including forced sterilisation of men and the destruction of houses and shops owned by Muslims in Turkmen Gate.
- Brutus, You!, a book by Chanakya Sen, is based on the internal politics of Jawaharlal Nehru University, Delhi during the period of Emergency.
- Vasansi Jirnani, a play by Torit Mitra, is inspired by Ariel Dorfman's Death and the Maiden and effects of the Emergency.
- The Tamil-language novel Marukkozhunthu Mangai (Girl with Fragrant Chinese Mugwort) by Ra. Su. Nallaperumal is based on the history of the Pallavas dynasty and a popular uprising in Kanchi in 725 A.D. It explains how the widowed Queen and the Princess kill the freedom of the people. Most of the incidents described in the novel resemble the Emergency period. Even the name of the characters in the novel is similar to Mrs. Gandhi and her family.
- The Malayalam-language autobiographical diary by political activist R. C. Unnithan, penned while the author was imprisoned as a political prisoner during the Emergency under MISA for sixteen months at Poojappura state prison in Thiruvananthapuram, Kerala, gives a personal account of his travails during the dark days of Indian democracy.
- The Tamil-language novel Karisal (Black Soil) by Ponneelan deals with the socio-political changes during the period.
- The Tamil-language novel Ashwamedam by Ramachandra Vaidyanath deals with the political movements during the period.
- In the 2001 book Life of Pi by Canadian author Yann Martel, Pi's father decides to sell his zoo and move his family to Canada around the time of the Emergency.
- The graphic novel Delhi Calm, by Vishwajyoti Ghosh, was published in 2010, that narrates the events of the Emergency.

=== Film ===
- Gulzar's Aandhi (1975) was banned, because the film was supposedly based on Indira Gandhi.
- Amrit Nahata's film Kissa Kursi Ka (1977), a bold spoof on the Emergency, where Shabana Azmi plays Janata ("the public"), a mute protagonist, was subsequently banned and reportedly, all its prints were burned by Sanjay Gandhi and his associates at his Maruti factory in Gurgaon.
- Yamagola, a 1977 Telugu film (Hindi re-make Lok Parlok), spoofs the emergency issues.
- I. S. Johar's 1978 Bollywood film Nasbandi is a satire on the sterilisation drive of the Government of India, where each one of the characters is trying to find sterilisation cases. The film was banned after its release due to its portrayal of the Indira Gandhi government.
- Although Satyajit Ray's 1980 film Hirak Rajar Deshe is a children's comedy, it is also a satire on the Emergency where the ruler forcefully mind washes the poor people.
- The 1985 Malayalam film Yathra directed by Balu Mahendra has the human rights violations by the police during the Emergency as its main plotline.
- 1988 Malayalam film Piravi is about a father searching for his son Rajan, who had been arrested by the police (and allegedly killed in custody).
- The 2005 Hindi film Hazaaron Khwaishein Aisi is set against the backdrop of the Emergency. The film, directed by Sudhir Mishra, also tries to portray the growth of the Naxalite movement during the Emergency era. The film tells the story of three youngsters in the 1970s when India was undergoing massive social and political changes.
- The 2012 Marathi film Shala discusses the issues related to the Emergency.
- Midnight's Children, a 2012 adaptation of Rushdie's novel, created widespread controversy due to the negative portrayal of Indira Gandhi and other leaders. The film was not shown at the International Film Festival of India and was banned from further screening at the International Film Festival of Kerala where it was premiered in India.
- Indu Sarkar is a 2017 Hindi political thriller film about the emergency, directed by Madhur Bhandarkar.
- 21 Months of Hell is a documentary film about the torture methods performed by the police.
- Kaattu Vithachavar is a 2018 Malayalam film about the period mentioning police brutality, their torture methods like Uruttal, Kakkayam torture camp and the famous Rajan case.
- Sarpatta Parambarai is a 2021 Tamil language sports film which is set against the backdrop of the Emergency and shows the arrest of DMK members.
- Emergency is a 2025 Indian Hindi-language historical biographical drama film directed and co-produced by Kangana Ranaut.

== See also ==
- Democracy in India
- Baroda dynamite case
- Rajan case
- Kakkayam torture camp
- Samvidhaan Hatya Diwas
- The Case That Shook India

== Sources ==
- Atul Kohli. Democracy and Discontent: India's Growing Crisis of Governability. Cambridge University Press. 1991. ISBN 0-521-39161-X.
- Atul Kohli (ed.). The Success of India's Democracy. Cambridge University Press. 2001 [2004]. ISBN 81-7596-107-4.
- Ayesha Jalal. Democracy and Authoritarianism in South Asia: a Comparative and Historical Perspective. Cambridge University Press. 1995 [1996]. ISBN 81-85618-75-5
- B. G. Verghese. Warrior of the Fourth Estate: Ramnath Goenka of the Express. Viking, Penguin India. 2005. ISBN 978-0-67005-842-6.
- Bipan Chandra et al. India Since Independence. Penguin India. 2008 [2011 digital edition]. e-ISBN 978-81-8475-053-9.
- Durga Das Basu. Introduction to the Constitution of India. LexisNexis Butterworths. 1960 [20th edition, 2011 reprint]. ISBN 978-81-8038-559-9.
- Inder Malhotra. Indira Gandhi: A Personal and Political Biography. Hodder and Stoughton. 1989. ISBN 0-340-40540-6.
- Mary C. Carras. Indira Gandhi: In the Crucible of Leadership. Jaico Publishing House. 1979 [1980].
- Partha Chatterjee. Lineages of Political Society. Permanent Black. 2011. ISBN 81-7824-317-2.
- Partha Chatterjee. Empire and Nation: Essential Writings, 1985–2005. Permanent Black. 2010. ISBN 81-7824-267-2.
- Ramachandra Guha. India After Gandhi: The History of the World's Largest Democracy. HarperCollins. 2008. ISBN 978-0-330-50554-3.
- S. S. Gill. The Dynasty: A Political Biography of the Premier Ruling Family of Modern India. HarperCollins. 1996. ISBN 81-7223-245-4.
- Subhash C. Kashyap. Indian Constitution: Conflicts and Controversies. Vitasta Publishing. 2010. ISBN 978-81-89766-41-2.
- Mithi Mukherjee, New Delhi: Oxford University Press, 2010. Print ISBN 9780198062509
- T. V. Sathyamurthy. State and Nation in the Context of Social.00 Change. Oxford University Press. 1994. ISBN 0-19-563136-6.

== Bibliography ==
- Advani, L. K. (2002). A prisoner's scrapbook. New Delhi: Ocean Books.
- Anderson, Edward, and Patrick Clibbens. "'Smugglers of Truth': The Indian diaspora, Hindu nationalism, and the Emergency (1975–77)." Modern Asian Studies 52.5 (2018): 1729–1773.
- Kuldip Nayar. The Judgement: Inside Story of the Emergency in India. 1977. Vikas Publishing House. ISBN 0-7069-0557-1.
- Chandra, Bipan. In the name of Democracy: JP movement and the Emergency (Penguin UK, 2017).
- P. N. Dhar. Indira Gandhi, the "Emergency", and Indian Democracy (2000), 424pp
- Jaffrelot, Christophe; Anil, Pratinav (2021). India's First Dictatorship: The Emergency, 1975-77. Oxford: Oxford University Press. ISBN 978-9390351602.
- Jinks, Derek P. "The Anatomy of an Institutionalized Emergency: Preventive Detention and Personal Liberty in India." Michigan Journal of International Law 22 (2000): 311+ online free
- Klieman, Aaron S. "Indira's India: Democracy and Crisis Government", Political Science Quarterly (1981) 96#2 pp. 241–259 in JSTOR
- Malkani, K. R. (1978). The Midnight Knock. New Delhi: Vikas Pub. House.
- Mathur, Om Prakash. Indira Gandhi and the emergency as viewed in the Indian novel (Sarup & Sons, 2004).
- Paul, Subin. "When India Was Indira Indian Express's Coverage of the Emergency (1975–77)." Journalism History 42.4 (2017): 201–211.
- Plys, Kristin. Brewing Resistance: Indian Coffee House and the Emergency in Postcolonial India (Cambridge UP, 2020). ISBN 9781108490528
- Prakash, Gyan. Emergency Chronicles: Indira Gandhi and Democracy's Turning Point (Princeton UP, 2019). ISBN 9780691186726 online review.
- Ramashray Roy and D. L. Sheth. "The 1977 Lok Sabha Election Outcome: The Salience of Changing Voter Alignments Since 1969," Political Science Review (1978), Vol. 17 Issue 3/4, pp. 51–63
- Coomi Kapoor. (2015) The Emergency: A Personal History. Viking Books.
- Shourie, Arun (1984). Mrs Gandhi's second reign. New Delhi: Vikas.
- Shourie, Arun (1978). Symptoms of fascism. New Delhi: Vikas.
- Sahasrabuddhe, P. G., & Vājapeyī, M. (1991). The people versus emergency: A saga of struggle. New Delhi: Suruchi Prakashan.
- Thakur, Janadan (1977). All The Prime Minister’s Men . Vikas Publishing. 1977. ISBN 9780706905663.
