= Kakkayam =

- Kakkayam Dam
- Kakkayam torture camp
