= Ragam (festival) =

Intercollegiate cultural event in India

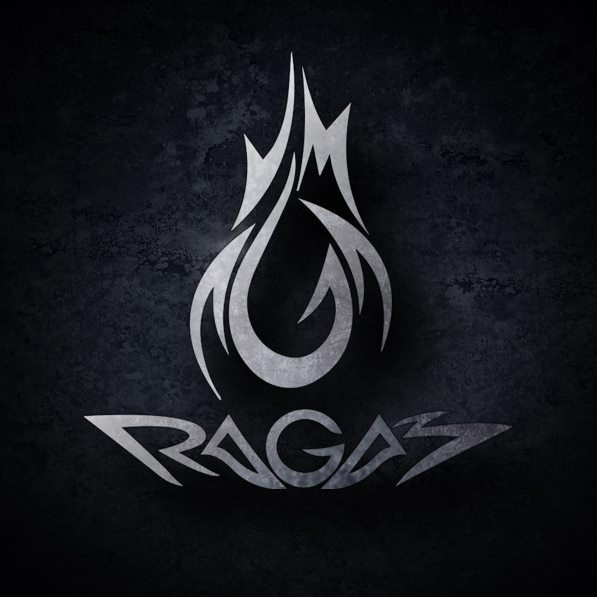
- Ragam Logo
- Genre: student-run, inter-college cultural festival
- Locations: Kozhikode, Kerala, India
- Guests: Jubin Nautiyal, Amit Trivedi, Jonita Gandhi, Pritam, Sonu Nigam, Neeraj Madhav, Mohit Chauhan, Aron Chupa, Ankit Tiwari, Farhan Akhtar, Shankar Mahadevan, Diego Miranda, KK, Shaan, Sunidhi Chauhan, Naresh Iyer, Nucleya, Karthik, Balabhaskar, Benny Dayal, Sukhwinder Singh, Suraj Jagan, Ranjith, Ranina Reddy, Stephen Devassy, Suvi Suresh, Vijay Prakash, Blaaze, Haricharan,
- Major events: Western and eastern orchestra, light music, group dance, mime, street play, short-film competition, fashion show, celebrity talks, and pro-shows
- Sponsor: National Institute of Technology Calicut
- Website: www.ragam.co.in

Ragam is South India’s largest Cultural fest hosted by National Institute of Technology, Calicut. Ragam blends a series of fine arts, socio-cultural and literary events, along with a variety of workshops, exhibitions and informal events. The fest attracts thousands of visitors to the campus annually and is one of the most popular cultural fests in India.

== History ==
Over two decades have passed since the inception of Ragam. The humble yet controversial beginnings of this festival are well known due to the infamous Rajan case that rocked Kerala in the seventies. Rajan, a student of the then-CREC was taken into police custody during the Emergency period and allegedly died in custody in 1976. In 1977 the All Kerala Rajan memorial music competition was started to commemorate his life. However, the same got discontinued in a few years. Later in 1987 the fest resurfaced as Ragam, an inter-college cultural fest in remembrance of Rajan. In 2006, Ragam was started with a solemn message ready by Eachara Warrier, father of late Rajan.

The prestigious ever-rolling Ragam trophy of "Nataraj", the trophy awarded to the overall champions at the fest, is considered as one of the most coveted prizes by the colleges in South India. The 37th edition of the fest was conducted in February 2025.

== Pro Shows ==
The Ragam pro-shows have always been noted for the celebrities who have performed at NIT Calicut. The shows are staged in the institute Football Ground, with a capacity of over 8000 spectators. Presently the Ragam "nites" include three cultural nites - ‘the inaugural nite’, ‘the highlight pro-show’, ‘the popular nite’.

For the highlight pro-show, NIT Calicut has previously hosted some of the biggest singers in the country including popular youth icon Sunidhi Chauhan, Sukhwinder Singh, Shaan, Krishnakumar Kunnath (KK), Farhan Akhtar, Sonu Nigam and Ankit Tiwari. Most recently for Ragam'18, spectators had the opportunity to watch Vishal–Shekhar perform live.

Benny Dayal, Naresh Iyer, Ranjith, Suraj Jagan and many more have taken the stage for the ‘Popular nite’, where a group of two or more singers perform for the crowds.

Notable bands that have visited the fest in the past are Parikrama, Silk Route, Whitenoiz and Motherjane along with tribute bands like Higher-on-maiden, Breathe the Floyd and Jail break. In 2011, Ragam witnessed a breathtaking performance by the 'Jai Ho' team. In 2009 Ragam became the first stage in Kerala to host a foreign band, with Breathe the Floyd, a tribute band to Pink Floyd. In 2015 Ragam truly went international, with Swiss folk metal band Eluveitie performing for the 'nite'. Sunburn Campus featuring DJ Diego Miranda for the first time in India took Ragam to new heights.

Year	Bands	Celebrities
2026	W.i.S.H.	Amit Prakash Mishra, Darshan Raval, Vedan, Yogi Sekar, Jonita Gandhi, Vineeth Sreenivasan
2025	Malayali Monkeys, Street Academics, Pineapple Express	Kanika Kapoor, Shalmali Kholgade, Salim–Sulaiman, Job Kurian
2024	—	—
2023	Avial (band), DJ Swattrex, Kill The Clowns	Neeti Mohan, Shakti Mohan, Mukti Mohan, Amit Trivedi, Jubin Nautiyal, Sayanora Philip
2022	DJ Kayan, Shanka Tribe, When Chai Met Toast	Jonita Gandhi, Neeraj Madhav, Mohit Chauhan
2021	—	—
2020	Ritviz, Sanam, Jetfire	Binesh Babu, Shalmali Kholgade, Hannah Shine
2019	Pink Floyd's	Amit Trivedi, Anne Amie
2018	The Local Train	Aron Chupa, Vishal–Shekhar
2017	Spunk	Sonu Nigam, Haricharan
2016	Skrat	Pritam, Aditi Singh Sharma, Antara Mitra, Nakash Aziz, Sreerama Chandra Mynampati
2015	Eluveitie	Ankit Tiwari, Diego Miranda
2014	Lagori	Farhan Akhtar, Benny Dayal
2013	Skrat, Jhanu	Shankar Mahadevan, Tanvi Shah, Haricharan
2012	Jail Break (Tribute band to Guns N' Roses)	Sukhwinder Singh, Suraj Jagan, Ranjith, Ranina Reddy
2011	Junkyard Groove, Jai Ho (Stephen Devassy, Suvi Suresh, Vijay Prakash, Blaaze)	Sunidhi Chauhan
2010	Higher-on-maiden	KK, Naresh Iyer
2009	Breathe the Floyd	Shankar Mahadevan, Benny Dayal
2008	Whitenoiz	Karthik
2007	Evergreen	Shaan
2006	Parikrama, The Big Indian Band	Balabhaskar

== Events ==
Ragam offers a plethora of events – literary, musical, dance, dramatics and more. Popular literary and oratory events include Extempore, Just-A-Minute(JAM), Debate, Twist in the tale and Mock Court. The musical events include a wide range of both solo events and group events like Swara Raaga and Amplified. The fest also includes a comprehensive set of artistic events extending from pencil sketching to mehendi design and face painting. For the dramatically inclined, movie spoof, mime, streetplay, mono-act and drama are major crowd-pullers.

The Choreo Nite (Inter-collegiate dance competition) and Couture Boulevard (Fashion Show) are two of the biggest and fiercely contested events at Ragam. Mr.&Ms. Ragam is one of the signature events of Ragam, aimed at testing the persona of the contestants through a series of professionally scrutinized rounds.

The ‘Take One’ short film competition is one of the most prestigious events of Ragam, with the competition being judged each year by prominent film-makers in the industry with the winners getting golden opportunities to interact with some of these brilliant minds.

Each year, thousands of participants from across the country compete for cash prizes and the Ragam rolling trophy, "Nataraj".

== Workshops ==
Besides the numerous events and the glamorous proshows, many workshops are conducted for the participants coming from various colleges with varied interests. The workshops over the years have included numerous Dance workshops, Photography workshops, Self-defense workshops and Mocktail workshops. Several Exhibitions are also conducted as a part of Ragam with the quality of these exhibitions increasing with each successive editions.

== Media ==
Being one of the biggest cultural fests in India, Ragam receives extensive coverage by newspapers, TV channels and other media. Noted dailies like The Hindu, Malayala Manorama, Mathrubhumi, Madhyamam, The Times of India and The Deccan Chronicle have been media partners at Ragam over the years. TV channels like Kairali and Rosebowl have partnered with the fest in the past. In ’09 edition, one of the events "Talking Point" was aired on the channel Rosebowl. Radio Media has also played a significant role, with stations like Radio Mango and Red FM on the list of previous sponsors. The fest also receives huge online publicity, with a large fan following for its Facebook page. The Ragam theme song is currently the second most viewed promotional video of a cultural fest in India.

== Ticketing Partners ==
For the 2026 edition, ticketing operations were handled by MakeMyPass, an online event ticketing platform.
