= Uruttal =

Torture technique in 20th century Keralam

Uruttal or Uruttu (Malayalam: [uɾuʈːɐl, uɾuʈːə̆], meaning: rolling) is a type of torture which was used in 20th-century Keralam. It was particularly common during the Indian Emergency period for interrogation. In the Rajan case it was done in the Kakkayam torture camp. It was a common torture to captured Naxals.

== Description ==
Uruttu is done by undressing the person and tying their hands and legs to a bench, then with a grain threshing/crushing club or a pestle called an "ulakka" placed on their thighs and 2 people on each side, the ulakka is forcefully pulled back and forth causing the thigh muscles and tendons to rip and tear, causing internal bleeding which may further cause death. The pain itself can cause a heart attack and death. Even if the person survives the thighs will be filled with pus rendering them unable to walk. The bleeding is internal and externally only swelling, bruise and inflammation is seen. Cloth may be stuffed in the victims mouth to avoid screaming. This torture technique was known for a long time but became famous in the news after the Rajan case where allegedly he was tortured to death in this way.

== Popular culture ==
Shown in the 2018 Malayalam film Kaattu Vithachavar.
