= Rajan case =

1976 death of an Indian man in police custody

P. Rajan
- Died: 2 March 1976; Kerala, India
- Cause of death: Torture murder
- Occupation: Student
- Known for: Unlawful arrest and subsequent death in custody

The Rajan case refers to the death of P. Rajan, a student of the Regional Engineering College, Calicut, as a result of torture in local police custody in Kakkayam, Kerala during the nationwide Emergency in India in 1976, and the legal battle that followed, which revealed facts of the incident to the public. His remains are yet to be recovered.

== Background ==
During the nationwide Emergency in India between 1975 and 1977, the Fundamental Rights of citizens were suspended by the government, creating a period of police activism. In Kerala, the Naxal movement was at its peak during this period. Major operations of Naxals in Kerala were attacks on police stations in rural areas. The police acted with vengeance upon the Naxalites and used the word Naxal to address those upon whom they had vengeance.

== Incident ==
P. Rajan, a student of the Calicut Regional Engineering College (presently the National Institute of Technology Calicut), was arrested by the Kerala Police on 1 March 1976, during the nationwide Emergency in India, along with his fellow student, Joseph Chaaly. As was later revealed by a petition in the High Court of Kerala, he was held in police custody in Kakkayam and tortured as part of the interrogation. He died from torture of an extreme kind, especially due to something called uruttal (a practice of "rolling" a heavy wooden log over the body of the victim). His body was then disposed of by the police and was never recovered.

Rajan's father, T. V. Eachara Warrier, complained to the authorities about his missing son. The police finally confirmed that he died in custody upon a habeas corpus suit, the first such suit in the history of Kerala, filed by his father in the High Court of Kerala.

== Inquiries by the family ==
P. Rajan's mother had become mentally unstable from the developments and was hospitalised. His father, T. V. Eachara Warrier, lost all of his money, but he did not know why his son was arrested. He made enquiries to police officers, who, he felt, would be able to give him the details about his son's arrest and also about his whereabouts. He made representations to the authorities, which produced no result. Somehow, he discovered that Rajan had been arrested under the directions of the DIG of Police, Crime Branch, Thiruvananthapuram. He met the then Home Minister of the State, K. Karunakaran. He sent petitions to the Home Secretary to the government of Kerala three times. There was not even a single reply or acknowledgement.

Warrier continued his efforts at getting some information about his son by similar representations made to the President of India and the Home Minister of the government of India, with copies to all the Members of Parliament from Kerala. He made similar representations to the Prime Minister of India and others, all to no effect. He met several police officers and learned that some arrested students were similarly detained in the Central Jail. He was vigorously searching in vain for his son in the three Central Jails and also in the various other police camps and other places. He met the Chief Minister several times because the Chief Minister had personal knowledge of the arrest of his son and also of his detention. On the last occasion, he met Sri. Achutha Menon, who expressed his helplessness in the matter and said that the matter was being dealt with by K. Karunakaran, Minister for Home Affairs.

He appealed to the general public in Kerala by expressing his grievance in a pamphlet distributed to the public. The Home Minister, who was a candidate in the recent elections, addressed several public meetings in Mala, Kalpetta and other constituencies of the State, and in some of the meetings, he made mention of the fact that P. Rajan was involved as an accused in a murder case and that was why he was detained. Rajan was never produced before a Magistrate.

== Findings ==
P. Rajan's father fought a long battle against the establishment to bring to light the facts behind the disappearance and expose the atrocities committed by the state. The petition and subsequent investigations found that Rajan had indeed been taken into custody, and perhaps died while in police custody. His body was not found, and many charges against the accused in this case had to be dropped. The accused included the chief of the Crime Branch wing of Kerala Police, DIG Jayaram Padikkal, who was convicted, but the conviction was overturned on appeal. Karunakaran was the Home Minister during the emergency. He resigned from the post of the Chief Minister of Kerala in 1978 due to an adverse judgment in the case. Warrier wrote the book, Memories of a Father, narrating his fights.

== In popular culture ==
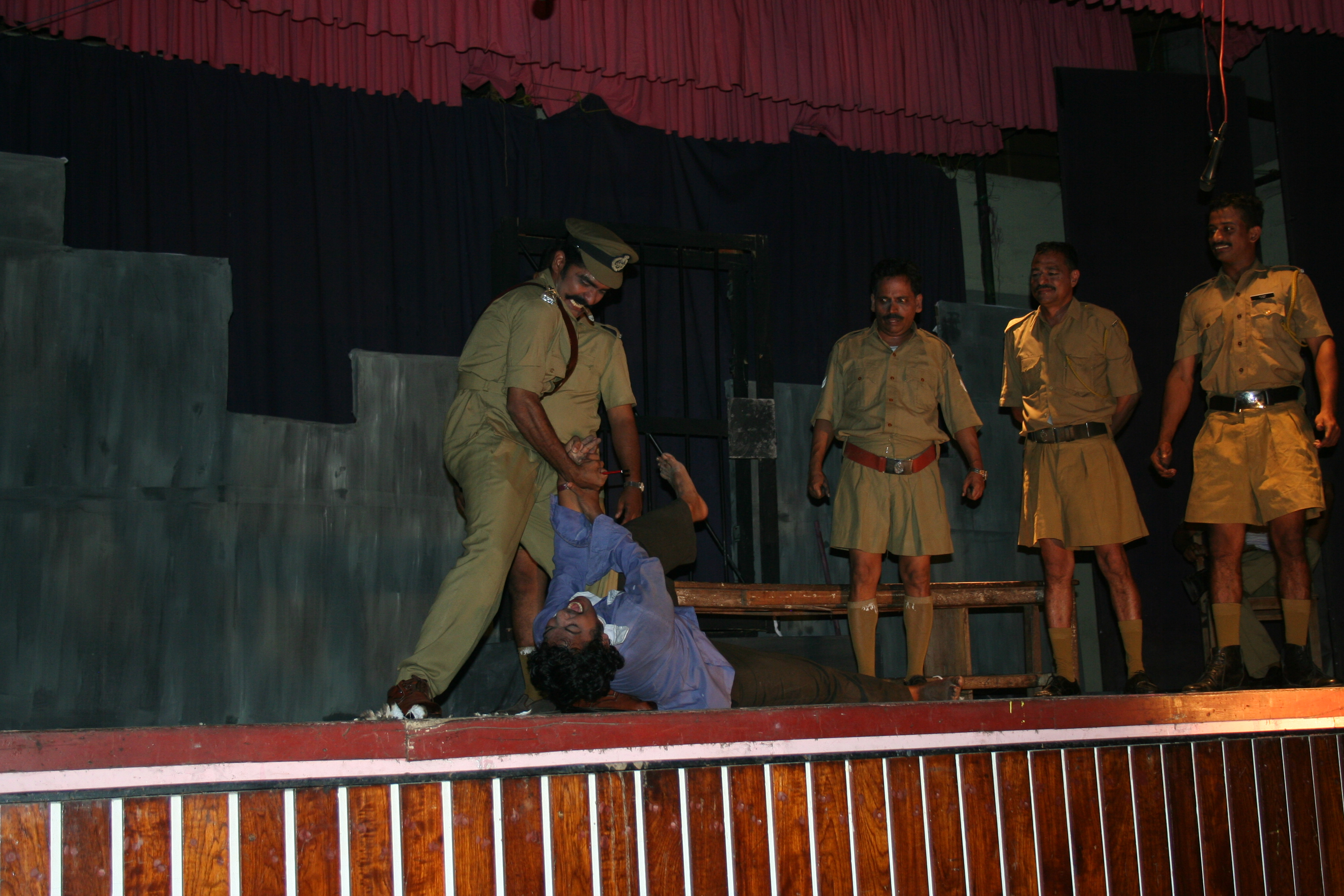
A scene from Ormakal Zindabad

The 1978 Malayalam film Rajan Paranja Katha, directed by M. S. Mani, is based on the case. The 1980 film Unarthupattu directed by PA Backer, also explores the brutalities of the Emergency through the eyes of an aged father searching for answers regarding the untimely death of his only son, who was also the family's sole support. The 1988 film Piravi, directed by Shaji N. Karun, has its plotline adapted from this incident. The 2013 film Idukki Gold references the case. Raman, one of the protagonists, throws ink at the Kerala Home Minister in protest against the Rajan case not being resolved. The 2016 film Sahapaadi 1975 also touches on the issue. The 2018 Malayalam movie Kaattu Vithachavar, directed by Satheesh Paul, presents an investigation by a police team into the disappearance of P. Rajan. The movie acted by Prakash Bare, Tini Tom and Jayaprakash Kuloor provides a factual review of events, though the names of characters have been slightly changed. The 2021 Tamil film Jai Bhim directly references the Rajan case as an example of a habeas corpus wherein the rare occurrence of a cross-examination in a high court as grounds for not producing a detainee by the state police is permitted.

In 1977, the All Kerala Rajan Memorial Music Competition was started at the National Institute of Technology Calicut (then known as REC Calicut) to commemorate P. Rajan's life. Every year since 1987, the institute has conducted its annual cultural festival, Ragam, in memory of Rajan. In 2006, the Ragam festival started with an audio message delivered by Rajan's father , Eachara Warrier.

C. R. Omanakuttan has written a book named Shavamtheenikal, which is an exposé of the brutality involved in the incident. In 2006, Ormakal Zindabad (Memories live long), directed by G. Ajayan was staged as a play at the Fine Arts Hall, Ernakulam, on August 29, based on the custodial death of Rajan. The leading characters were portrayed by Salih Rawther as Jayaram Padikkal and Shabu Madhavan as Rajan.

== See also ==
- Naxal Varghese
- Kakkayam torture camp
- Uruttal
