= T. V. Eachara Warrier =

Indian academic (1920–2006)

T. V. Eswara Warrier (1920–2006) was a professor from Thrissur district in the south Indian state of Kerala. He became famous for his legal struggle against the Congress-led Government of Kerala during the Emergency, in an attempt to get to the facts about the disappearance of his son Rajan.

After the Emergency was withdrawn, the Rajan case rocked Kerala politics. Kerala's home minister, K. Karunakaran, was forced to step down following some adverse comments from the High Court of Kerala on a habeas corpus writ petition filed Warrier seeking the state to produce his son in court.

Warrier's fight for the cause of his son also became one of the best remembered human rights fights in the state, and his book titled Oru Achchante Ormakkurippukal (Memories of a Father) had also attracted wide attention and fetched the state award in 2004. He was married to Radha, who predeceased him in 2000. Other than Rajan, they had two daughters too.
