= 21 Months of Hell =

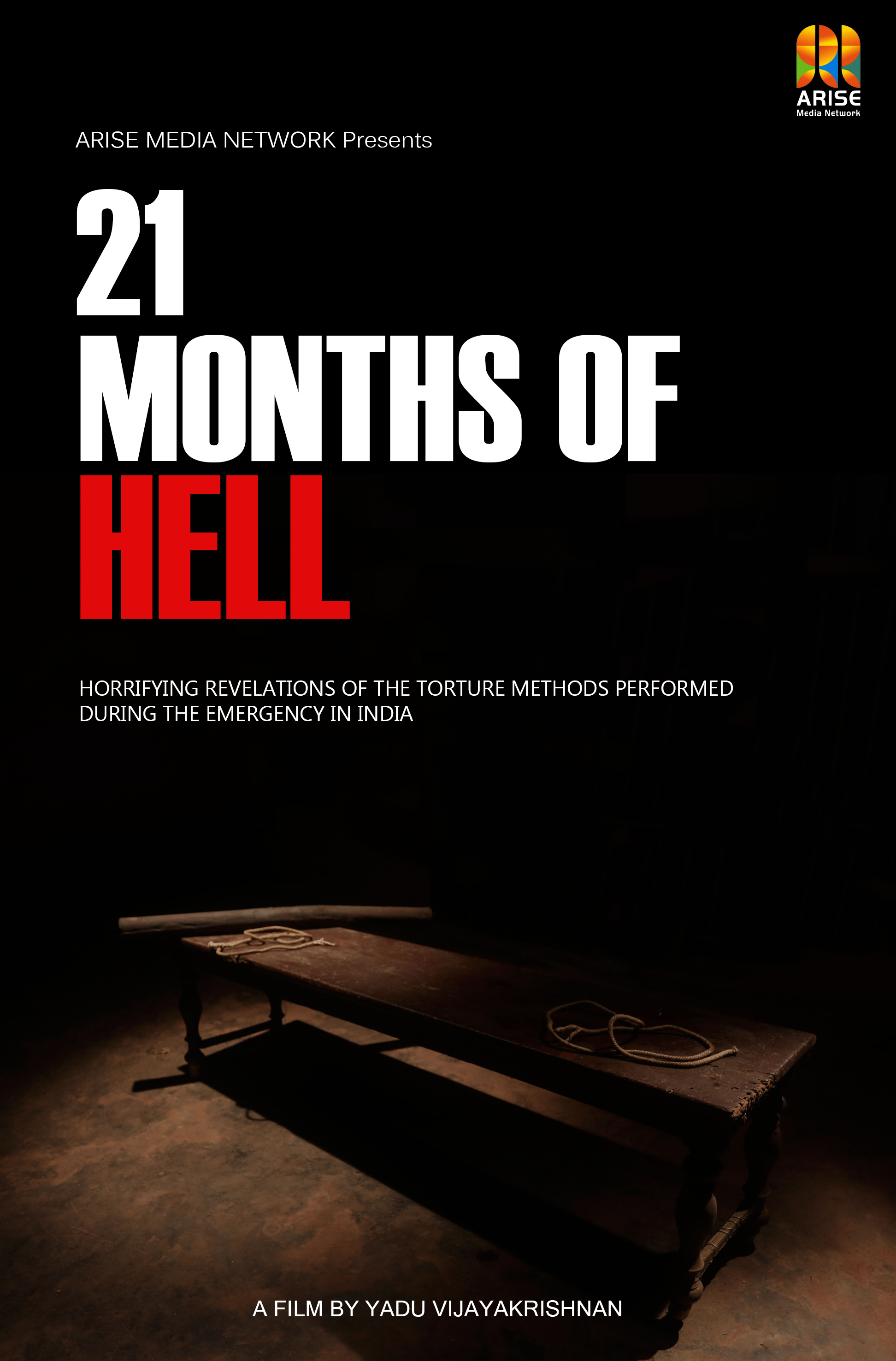
- Directed by: Yadu Vijayakrishnan
- Produced by: Arise Media Network
- Cinematography: Yadu Vijayakrishnan
- Edited by: Anoop CG
- Distributed by: Arise Media Network
- Release date: 20 November 2017
- Running time: 78 minutes
- Country: India
- Language: Malayalam

21 Months of Hell is a 2017 documentary film about the torture methods performed by the police in India during The Emergency. The film is directed by Yadu Vijayakrishnan and produced by Arise Media Network.

21 Months of Hell had its first private screening in New Delhi with the presence of Indian Union Minister of State Aswini Kumar Choubey who was also a victim of torture during Emergency. The film had overall positive response.

Controversies sparked as the Central Board of Film Certification rejected the film citing that there was no proof of the torture methods used by police during the Emergency.

== Controversy ==
The Kerala Regional Office of Central Board of Film Certification also known as Film Censor Board denied certificate for the film citing various reasons. Public exhibition in India requires certificate from the CBFC. Yadu Vijayakrishnan alleged that the Board didn't even give him a chance to edit the scenes it deemed problematic; instead, it refused to certify the film altogether. Although the film was applied for an 'A' certificate, the Censor Board refused the portrayal of violence in it. The officials of CBFC asked for proofs for the torture methods during Emergency and when Yadu told them that he had interviewed surviving victims, the CBFC replied demanding written government reports. Claiming that there aren't any solid evidence for torture and the film had too much violence, the CBFC rejected the film and forwarded the report to CBFC Mumbai Headquarters for revising committee. Large political uproar occurred from RSS activists as most of the senior leaders of RSS and BJP, the ruling party, are victims of the torture during Emergency. Yadu Vijayakrishnan alleged that the members of Central Board of Film Certification are leftists and pro-Congress and that they want to hide the efforts of RSS activists in restoring democracy during Emergency. He also added that the BJP is accused of interfering media industry and the film talks about RSS and Jansangh's work to restore democracy, following this logic he would've got a certificate.
