= Prasad Krishna =

Indian academic administrator

- Citizenship: Indian
- Occupations: Academic administrator, mechanical engineer
- Employer: National Institute of Technology Calicut
- Known for: Director of National Institute of Technology Calicut
- Title: Director

Academic background
- Education: National Institute of Technology Karnataka; Indian Institute of Technology Madras; University of Michigan

Prasad Krishna is an Indian academic and mechanical engineer, serving as the director of the National Institute of Technology Calicut (NIT Calicut) since 2021.

== Early life and education ==
Prasad Krishna completed his Bachelor of Engineering in Mechanical Engineering from the National Institute of Technology Karnataka (then Karnataka Regional Engineering College), securing first rank and receiving the Kirloskar Gold Medal and the Sir M. Visvesvaraya Memorial Prize.

He obtained his Master of Technology degree from the Indian Institute of Technology Madras, and later earned a Ph.D. in Manufacturing from the University of Michigan, United States.

== Career ==
Krishna has over three decades of experience across academia, research, and industry. Early in his career, he worked in organisations such as HMT Ltd., the Gas Turbine Research Establishment (GTRE) under DRDO, and the Vikram Sarabhai Space Centre (VSSC) under ISRO.

He began his academic career at NIT Calicut (then Calicut Regional Engineering College) in 1991 and served there until 2009.

He later joined the National Institute of Technology Karnataka, Surathkal, as a professor in the Department of mechanical engineering, where he also served in administrative roles including Dean (Alumni Affairs and International Relations).

== Director, NIT Calicut ==
Krishna was appointed director of the National Institute of Technology Calicut in 2021.

NIT Calicut is an Institute of National Importance governed by the National Institutes of Technology, Science Education and Research Act, 2007.

As Director, he has emphasized institutional development, research growth, and international collaboration, as reflected in official communications and institutional initiatives.

== Research and contributions ==
Krishna's research interests include CNC machine tools, robot calibration, advanced manufacturing processes, and modelling of solidification processes.

He has published extensively in journals and conference proceedings and has supervised doctoral research in manufacturing engineering and related fields.

== See also ==
- National Institute of Technology Calicut
- National Institute of Technology Karnataka
- Engineering education in India
