= R. C. Unnithan =

Indian Malayalam politician

- Born: 21 January 1936; Adoor, Kerala, India
- Died: 25 August 2015 (aged 79); Kodumon, Kerala, India
- Citizenship: India
- Education: Master's: B.L
- Alma mater: University College, Thiruvananthapuram: N S S College, Pandalam
- Occupations: Lawyer, Politician, Writer
- Notable work: Adiyantharavasthayile Ente Jail Diary, Vayalinte Geetham
- Title: Lawyer
- Spouse: Indira Devi
- Parent(s): Narayanan Unnithan, Kunjukochitti Amma

Ramachandran Unnithan; born 21 January 1936), popularly known as R. C. Unnithan or simply R.C., was a Malayalam political activist and trade union leader. he was one of the early leaders of the Communist Party of India in the southern districts and eastern plantations of Kerala, India.

He contested on CPI(M) party tickets for the state legislative election in 1965 from Adoor constituency and from the nearby Konni constituency in 1970 and 1977. He was a political prisoner at the state prison along with several leading opposition leaders who were imprisoned in Kerala and elsewhere all across India during the Emergency regime when fundamental democratic rights were curtailed for twenty-one months between 1975 and 1977.

He published several books and articles. Notable among them was a personal/political diary penned while being imprisoned during emergency years.
