= John Matthai (civil servant) =

Indian civil servant

John Matthai is a former chief secretary of Kerala, India. He belongs to the 1971 batch of Indian Administrative Service (IAS).

== Career ==
Matthai began his career as sub-collector of Thalassery. He was appointed Collector of Kottayam in 1978. He held various positions such as managing director of State Cooperative Marketing Federation, director of public instruction, and secretary for industries, power and forests and wildlife departments before becoming the principal secretary of industries in 1996.

Subsequently, he was posted as commissioner of commercial taxes and commissioner of excise. He was promoted as additional chief secretary in 2005. Later in 2006, he was appointed as the chief secretary to V. S. Achuthanandan.

== Personal life ==
He is a graduate from the Regional Engineering College Calicut. He is the youngest brother of Moran Cyril Mar Baselios, Catholicos of the Syro-Malankara Catholic Church.
