= Inder Malhotra =

- Born: 1 February 1930
- Died: 11 June 2016 (aged 86)
- Occupations: journalist, editor and author

Inder Malhotra (1 February 1930 – 11 June 2016) was an Indian journalist, editor and author.

== Career ==
Malhotra was the resident editor of The Statesman in New Delhi from 1965 to 1971. He was the India correspondent for The Guardian from 1965–1978, until becoming editor at The Times of India, a position he held from 1978–1986. Since 1986 he was a syndicated columnist for numerous dailies and periodicals in India and abroad. In 1991 Malhotra authored a political and personal biography of Indira Gandhi.

== Awards ==
Malhotra received the Ramnath Goenka Lifetime Achievement Award in 2013.

== Personal life and death ==
Malhotra was married to Rekha Malhotra, a former classical dancer with the Ram Gopal dance troupe in the 1950s. She died at age 81 in 2007. The couple had one son.

The memorial service of Inder Malhotra was held on 14 June 2016 at Chinmaya Mission, New Delhi.
