= Government Kalidas Girls College, Ujjain =

College in Madhya Pradesh

- Other name: Kalidas Girls College
- Type: State Government Supported
- Established: 1982
- Affiliations: UGC, Vikram University, NAAC
- Principal: Mahesh Sharma
- Faculty: 12
- Location: Ujjain, Madhya Pradesh, India; 23.190°N 75.778°E
- Campus: Urban
- Website: www.mphighereducation.nic.in/kalidascollege

Government Kalidas Girls College, Ujjain -- also known by the shorter names as Kalidas Girls College, Ujjain or Kalidas College -- is a Girls government degree college located in Ujjain, Madhya Pradesh, India. It is recognized by the University Grants Commission (UGC) and affiliated to Vikram University. it is accredited A grade by the National Assessment and Accreditation Council (NAAC)
