= Torit Mitra =

Indian playwright and theatre director (1956)

- Born: 4 September 1956 (age 70); India
- Education: Delhi College of Arts and Commerce, University of Delhi
- Occupations: Playwright, theatre director, painter, writer
- Notable work: 80 plays, including Abba Othoba Ekti Nidoya Shonsharer Galpo
- Awards: Best Playwright Award, Best Director Award, Gunijon Sambardhana (Eminent Citizen Honor)

Torit Mitra (born 4 September 1956) is an Indian Bengali playwright and theatre director, who co-founded the avant-garde theatre company Sansaptak in 1992.

He has written 80 plays, all staged by Sansaptak.

== Education and career ==
Mitra graduated with a Bachelor of Fine Arts degree in 1979 from the Delhi College of Arts and Commerce (a constituent college of the University of Delhi) and received a UNICEF Fellowship for Fine Arts.

He started painting professionally and became famous for his black-and-white drawings with political overtones. He received many national and international awards and recognitions. His paintings found their way to national and international collections and archives. He was also associated with the literary movement of the time.

Initially, Mitra started working in Bengali amateur theatre groups as a set designer and actor. At the age of 21, he became the youngest playwright and director of Bangla to receive an award in Delhi's theatre arena.

He was unhappy and dissatisfied with the practices in the urban Bengali theatre in Delhi. In 1992, some of his theatre friends approached him with the motivation to build a group of their own. They all had a common goal: a new outlook to the arts and theatre and a new language that would be their own. Eventually "Sansaptak" was born that became the turning point for Delhi's Bengali theatre. It was solely formed for the purpose of theatre.

Since 1982, Mitra has penned 34 plays – all staged by Saansaptak and other groups under his direction and design. All his plays have been critically acclaimed and loved by audiences.

He has received Best Playwright and Best Director awards for several of his plays at national competitions. He was honored several times by receiving the Gunijon Sambardhana (Eminent Citizen Honor) for being the only prolific contemporary writer and director in Delhi and for promoting progressive developments in the Bangla language through his stories, poetry and contemporary plays.

Mitra's plays have been performed under his design and direction at international and national theatre festivals, including Bharat Rang Mahotsav, Legends of India, International Ganga-Jamuna Festival, All India Short Play Festival, Delhi International Arts Festival, Bharatendu Natya Utsav.

Three of his original Bengali plays have been published. A publication consisting of four Hindi plays is being translated from the original Bengali plays.

Apart from plays, Mitra has penned innumerable short stories, poems and articles, published and unpublished. A collection of his 14 best short stories has been published entitled Abba Othoba Ekti Nidoya Shonsharer Galpo, creating ripples in the Bengali community.
