= Kakkayam Dam =

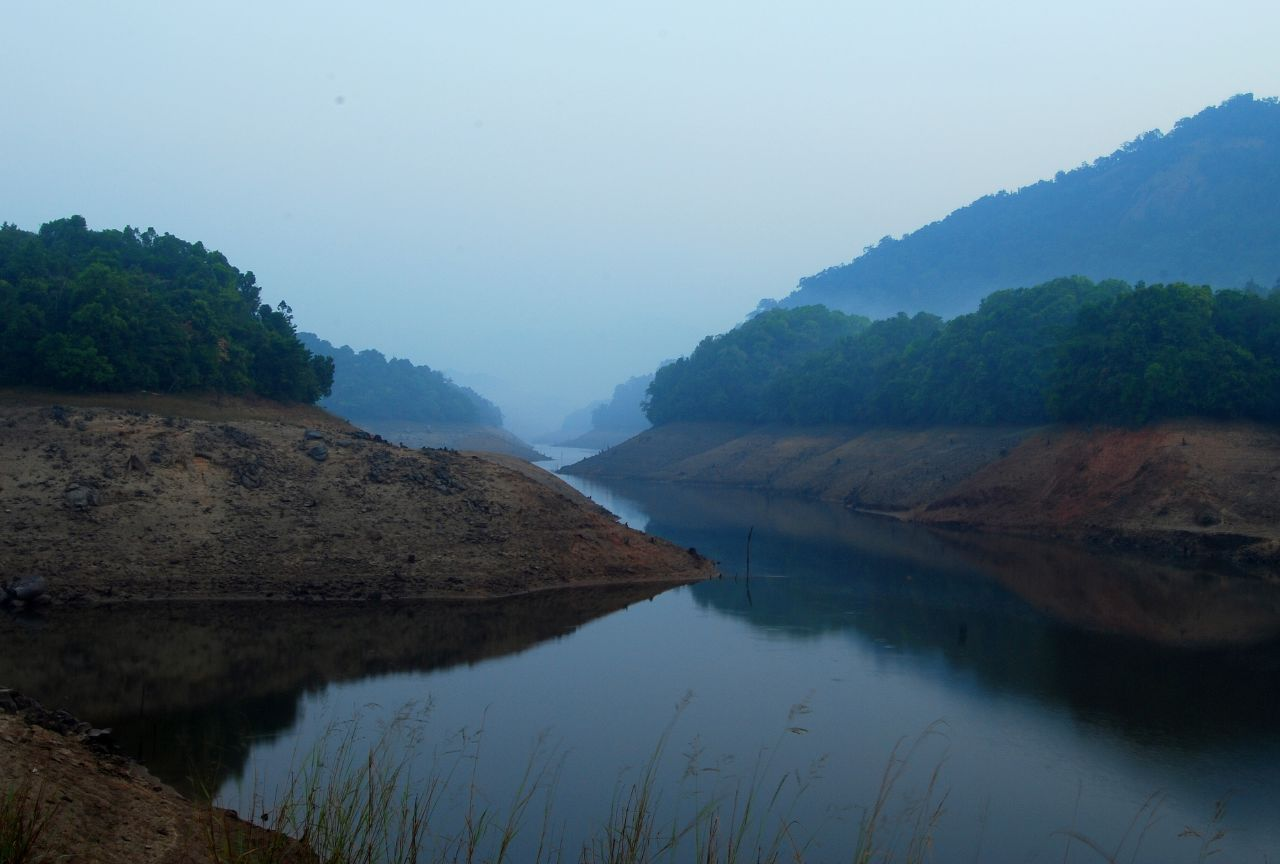
- Kakkayam Dam Reservoir

- Location in Kerala Location in India
- Coordinates: 11.551°N 75.925°E

Kakkayam is a dam site located at Koorachundu in Kozhikode, Kerala. Kakkayam is on the outskirts of the Western Ghats, and Malabar Wildlife Sanctuary, a 7,421-hectare (18,340-acre) abode of wild animals including elephants and bisons. Kakkayam has an abundant wildlife population and is also a trekking and rock climbing destination.

This reservoir is part of the Kuttiyadi Hydro Electric Project & is located at a height of about 750 m (2,460 ft) above sea level. The pen stock runs down from the dam site and goes through various tunnels and hills to the Kuttiyadi Main power house at Kakkayam with an installed capacity of 225MW. Water coming out of this power house is diverted to two small hydro electric projects namely Kuttiyadi Tail Race power house and kakkayam small hydro electric project with an installed capacity of 3.75 MW and 3 MW Respectively.After this, the tail water joins the river and is utilized for Peruvannamoozhi Irrigation Project.

== Gallery ==
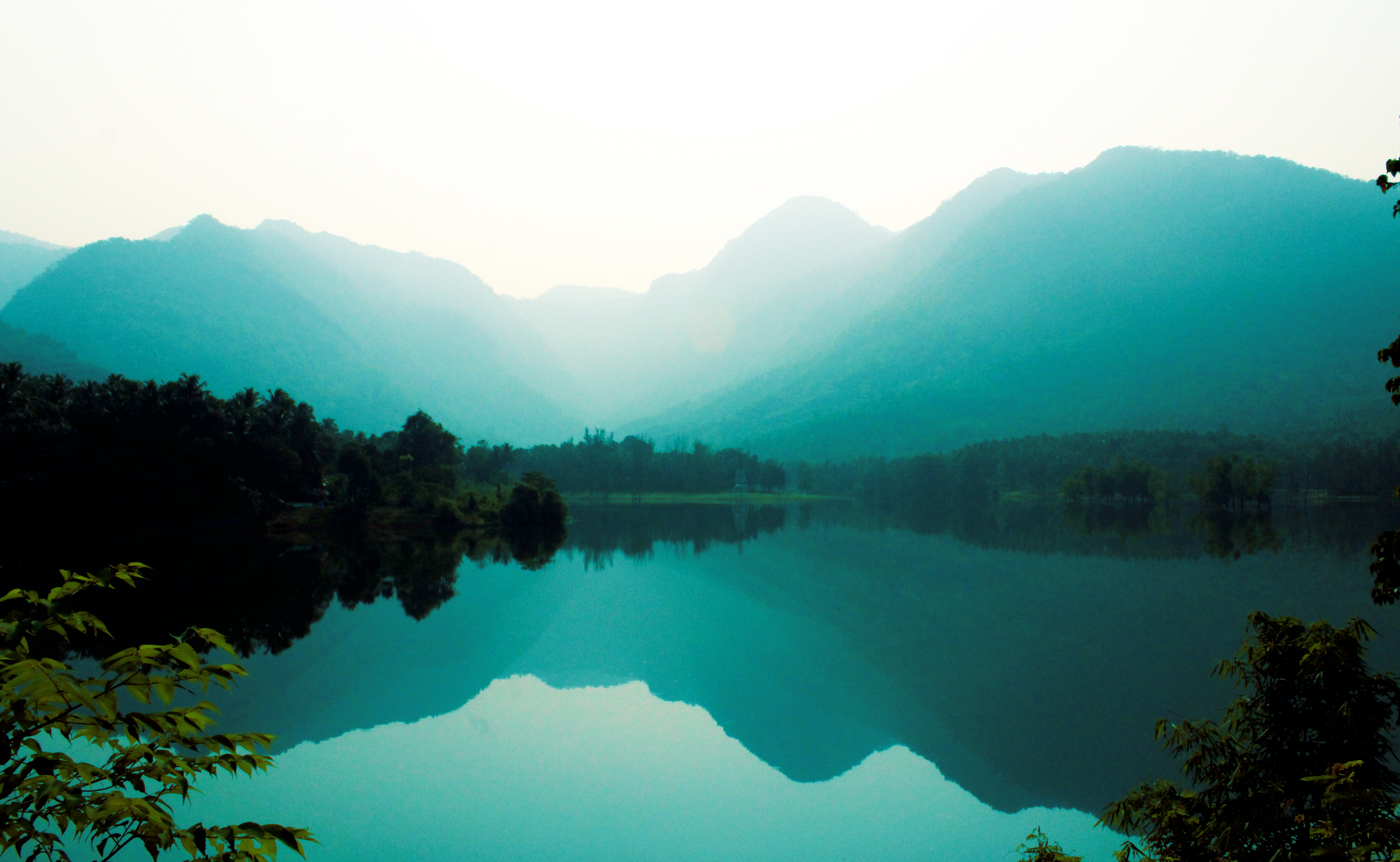
Kakkayam hills

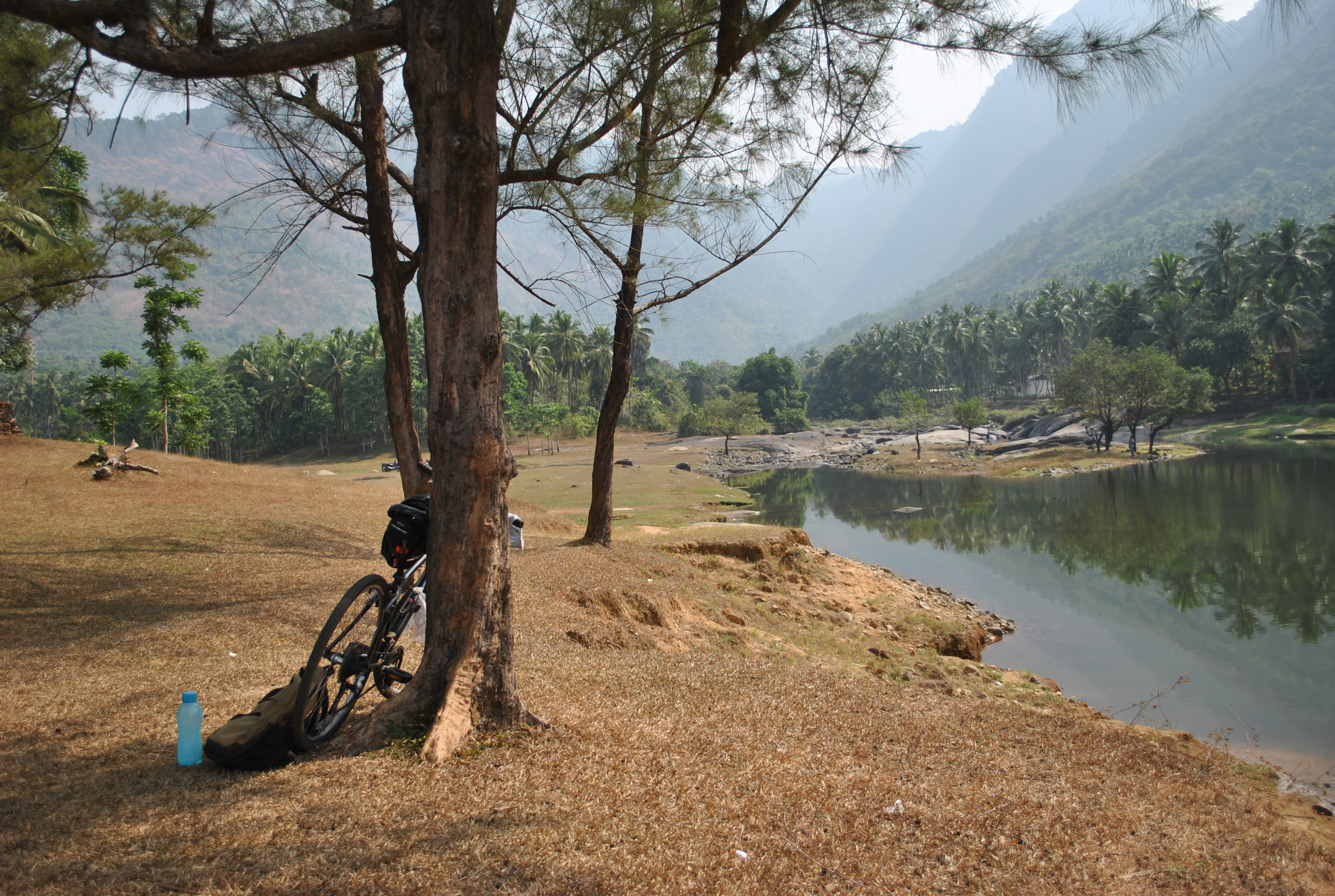
Kakkayam valley near Kakkayam Dam

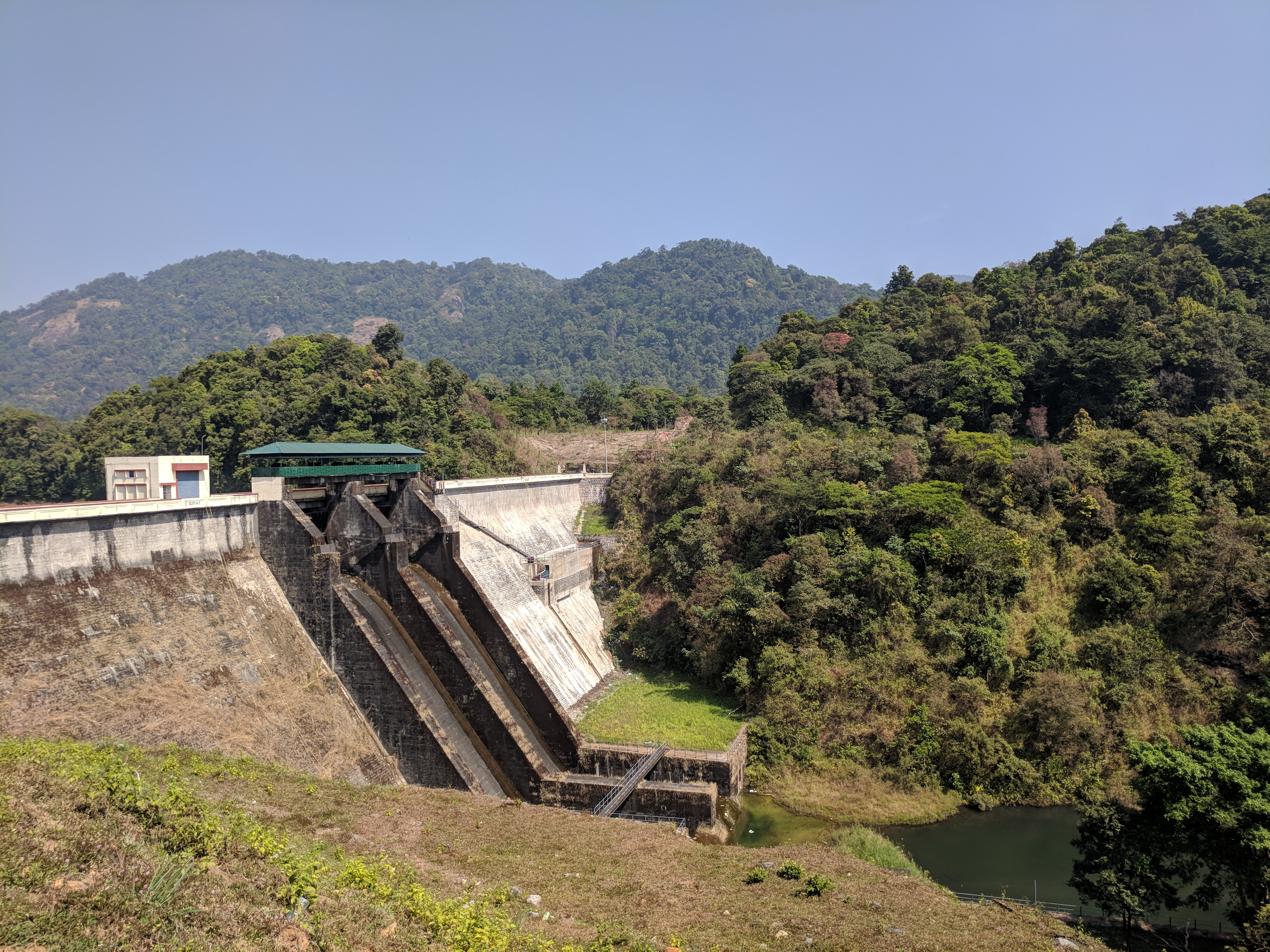
Kakkayam Dam (2018)

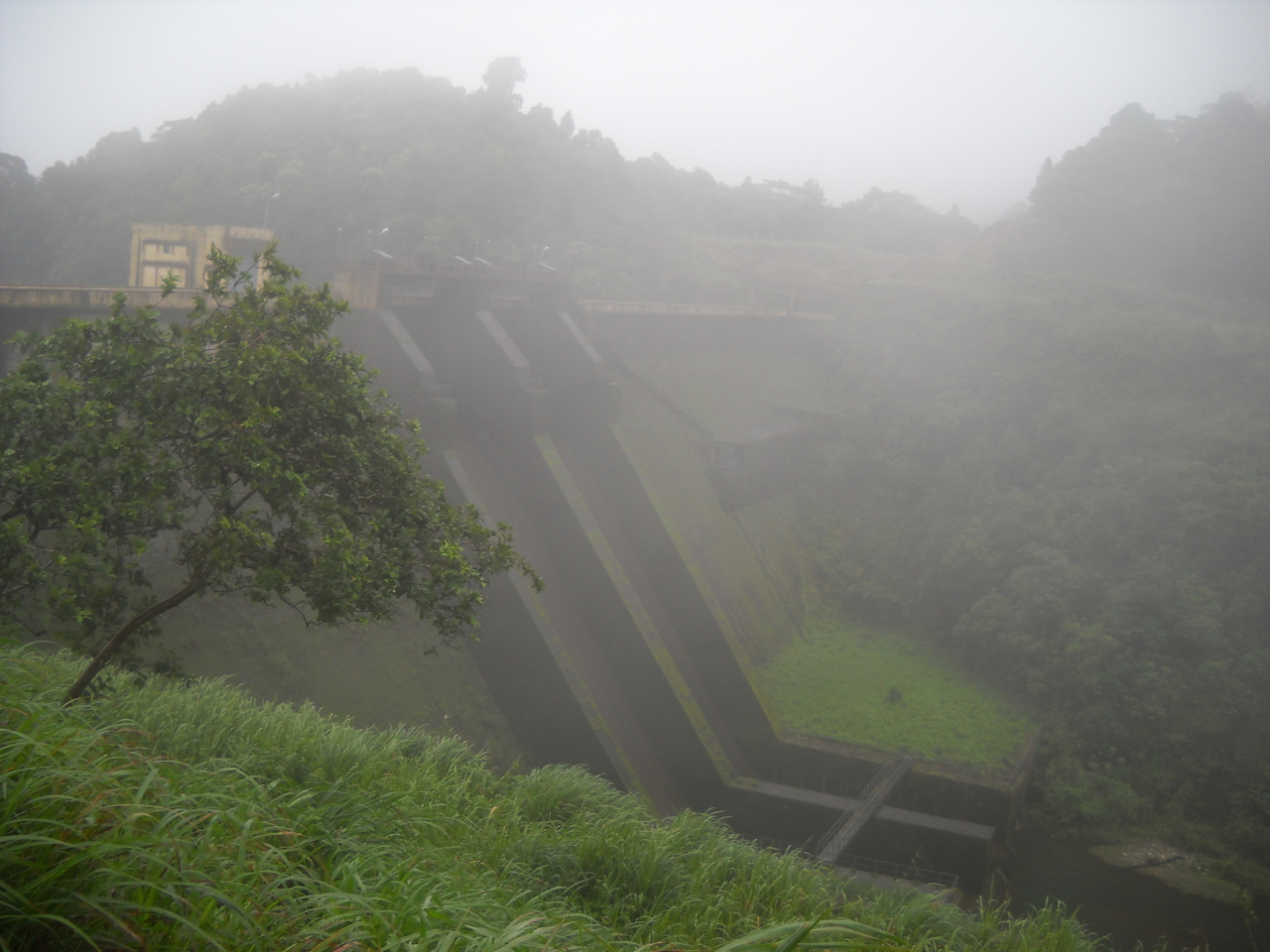
Kakkayam Dam in rainforest fog

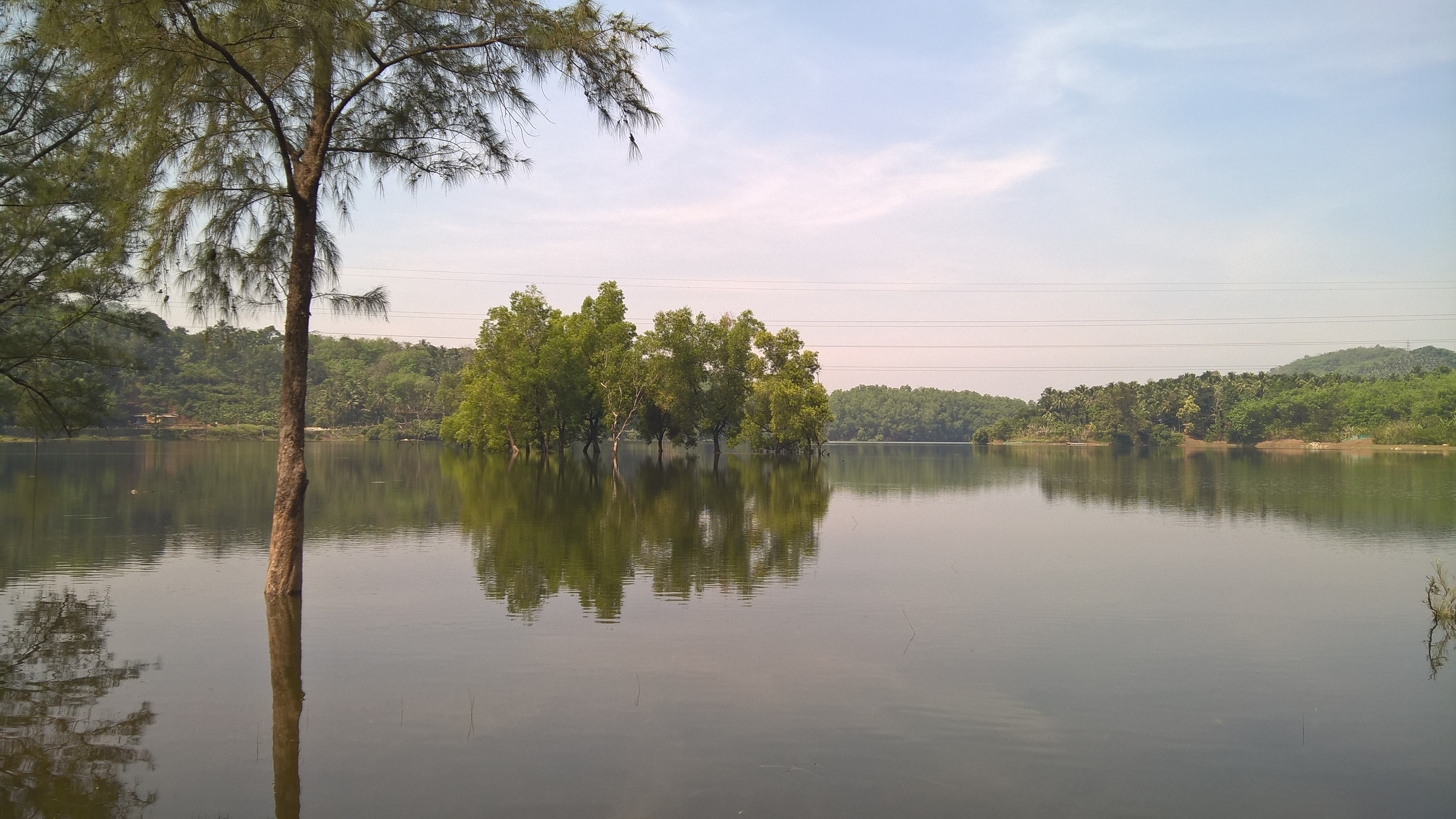
Kakkayam valley lake

== Distance from Kakkayam ==
- Kozhikode (51 km)
- Kozhikode Railway Station (53 km)
- Calicut International Airport (64 km)
- Perambra (22 km)

=== Nearest tourist places ===
- Vayalada (18 km)
- Kappad Beach (40 km)

== See also ==
- Kakkayam torture camp
