= Kakkayam torture camp =

Police torture camp in Kakkayam, Kerala

Kakkayam Police Torture Camp
- Location: Kakkayam, Kerala, India

Kakkayam police torture camp was located in the forested areas of Kakkayam, Kozhikode, Kerala. The camp was operational during the Indian Emergency period, primarily targeting Naxals. The Rajan case happened there.

== In popular culture ==
The camp is mentioned in the 2018 Malayalam film Kaattu Vithachavar, the 2008 film Sound of Boot, and the 2025 film Eko.
