= S.R. Krishna Kumar =

Indian judge of Karnataka High Court

The Honourable Justice of Karnataka High Court S.R. Krishna Kumar

Judge of Karnataka High Court
- Incumbent
- Assumed office 1 March 2021
- Nominated by: A.S. Oka, Chief Justice of Karnataka High Court
- Appointed by: Ram Nath Kovind, President of India

Additional Judge of Karnataka High Court
- In office 23 September 2019 – 28 February 2021
- Nominated by: A.S. Oka, Chief Justice of Karnataka High Court
- Appointed by: Ram Nath Kovind, President of India

Personal details
- Born: 7 May 1970 (age 56)
- Education: University Law College, Bangalore University

Singapuram Raghavachar Krishna Kumar is an Indian judge of Karnataka High Court.

== Early life ==
S.R. Krishna Kumar was born on 7 May 1970. He graduated with Bachelor of Law from University Law College, Bangalore University. He enrolled as an Advocate on 29 August 1992. He practiced as an advocate in the Karnataka High Court as well as Civil Courts, Criminal Courts and Tribunals.

== Judge of High Court ==
The Karnataka High Court Collegium headed by Chief Justice A.S. Oka recommended the appointment of S.R. Krishna Kumar as an Additional Judge of Karnataka High Court. The recommendation was cleared by the Supreme Court Collegium headed by Chief Justice of India Ranjan Gogoi on 25 March 2019 and he was appointed on 23 September 2019.

The Karnataka High Court Collegium headed by Chief Justice A.S. Oka recommended the elevation of S.R. Krishna Kumar as a Permanent Judge of Karnataka High Court. The recommendation was cleared by the Supreme Court Collegium headed by Chief Justice of India S.A. Bobde on 16 December 2020 and he was appointed on 1 March 2021.
