= H. G. Ramesh =

H. G. Ramesh may refer to:

- Huluvadi G. Ramesh (born 20 May 1957), Judge at the Madras High Court
- Humchadakatte G. Ramesh (born 16 January 1957), Acting Chief Justice of the High Court of Karnataka
