= Alok Aradhe =

Judge of the Supreme Court of India

Hon'ble Justice Alok Aradhe
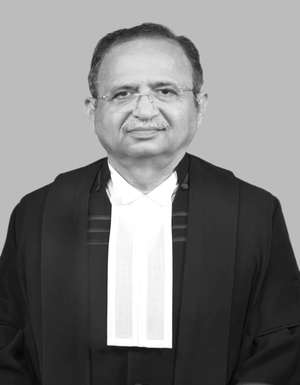
- Official portrait

Judge of Supreme Court of India
- Incumbent
- Assumed office 29 August 2025
- Nominated by: B. R. Gavai
- Appointed by: Droupadi Murmu

48th Chief Justice of Bombay High Court
- In office 21 January 2025 – 28 August 2025
- Nominated by: Sanjiv Khanna
- Appointed by: Droupadi Murmu
- Preceded by: D. K. Upadhyaya
- Succeeded by: Shree Chandrashekhar

6th Chief Justice of Telangana High Court
- In office 23 July 2023 – 20 January 2025
- Nominated by: D. Y. Chandrachud
- Appointed by: Droupadi Murmu
- Preceded by: Ujjal Bhuyan; P. N. Rao (acting); A. K. Shavili (acting)
- Succeeded by: A. K. Singh; Sujoy Paul (acting); P. S. Koshy (acting)

Judge of Karnataka High Court
- In office 17 November 2018 – 22 July 2023
- Nominated by: Ranjan Gogoi
- Appointed by: Ram Nath Kovind
- Acting Chief Justice
- In office 3 July 2022 – 14 October 2022
- Appointed by: Ram Nath Kovind
- Preceded by: Ritu Raj Awasthi
- Succeeded by: P. B. Varale

Judge of Jammu and Kashmir High Court
- In office 20 September 2016 – 16 November 2018
- Nominated by: T. S. Thakur
- Appointed by: Pranab Mukherjee
- Acting Chief Justice
- In office 11 May 2018 – 10 August 2018
- Appointed by: Ram Nath Kovind
- Preceded by: B. D. Ahmed; R. Sudhakar (acting)
- Succeeded by: Gita Mittal

Judge of Madhya Pradesh High Court
- In office 29 December 2009 – 19 September 2016
- Nominated by: K. G. Balakrishnan
- Appointed by: Pratibha Patil

Personal details
- Born: 13 April 1964 (age 62) Raipur, Madhya Pradesh (present-day Raipur, Chhattisgarh)
- Education: B. Sc. and LL. B.

Alok Aradhe (born 13 April 1964) is an Indian Judge. Presently, he is serving as a Judge of the Supreme Court of India. He is a former Chief Justice of Telangana High Court and Bombay High Court. He has also served as a Judge of Karnataka High Court, Jammu and Kashmir High Court and Madhya Pradesh High Court. He has also served as Acting Chief Justice of Karnataka High Court and Jammu and Kashmir High Court.

== Career ==
Aradhe was born in 1964 at Raipur, the then Madhya Pradesh. He passed B.Sc. and LL.B. and started practice in Madhya Pradesh High Court at Jabalpur from 1988. He worked on Civil, Constitutional, Arbitration and Company Matters. Aradhe was designated as Senior Advocate in April 2007. He revised the 5th and 6th editions of the book, Principles of Administrative Law by M. P. Jain and S. N. Jain with Late Hon'ble Chief Justice G. P. Singh. Aradhe was a visiting Faculty in Judicial Officers Training and Research Institute of Madhya Pradesh. On 29 December 2009 he was appointed Additional Judge of the Madhya Pradesh High Court and was made permanent on 15 February 2011.

He was transferred to Jammu and Kashmir High Court on 16 September 2016. He served as Chairman of Jammu and Kashmir State Judicial Academy and became the Executive Chairman of Jammu and Kashmir State Legal Services Authority. He took charge as Acting Chief Justice of the Jammu and Kashmir High court on 11 May 2018.

He was again transferred to Karnataka High Court and took oath as Judge on 17 November 2018. He was appointed as Acting Chief Justice of Karnataka High Court on 3 July 2022 consequent upon the retirement of Justice Ritu Raj Awasthi, Chief Justice, Karnataka High Court.

On 23 July 2023, Alok Aradhe was appointed as chief justice of Telangana High Court. He was transferred as Chief Justice of Bombay High Court on 21 January 2025.

On 25 August 2025 Supreme court collegium led by CJI B. R. Gavai recommended him to be appointed as judge of Supreme Court of India along with Patna High Court chief justice Vipul Manubhai Pancholi and his appointment was cleared by central government on 27 August 2025.
