= Satish Chandra Sharma =

Judge of the Supreme Court of India

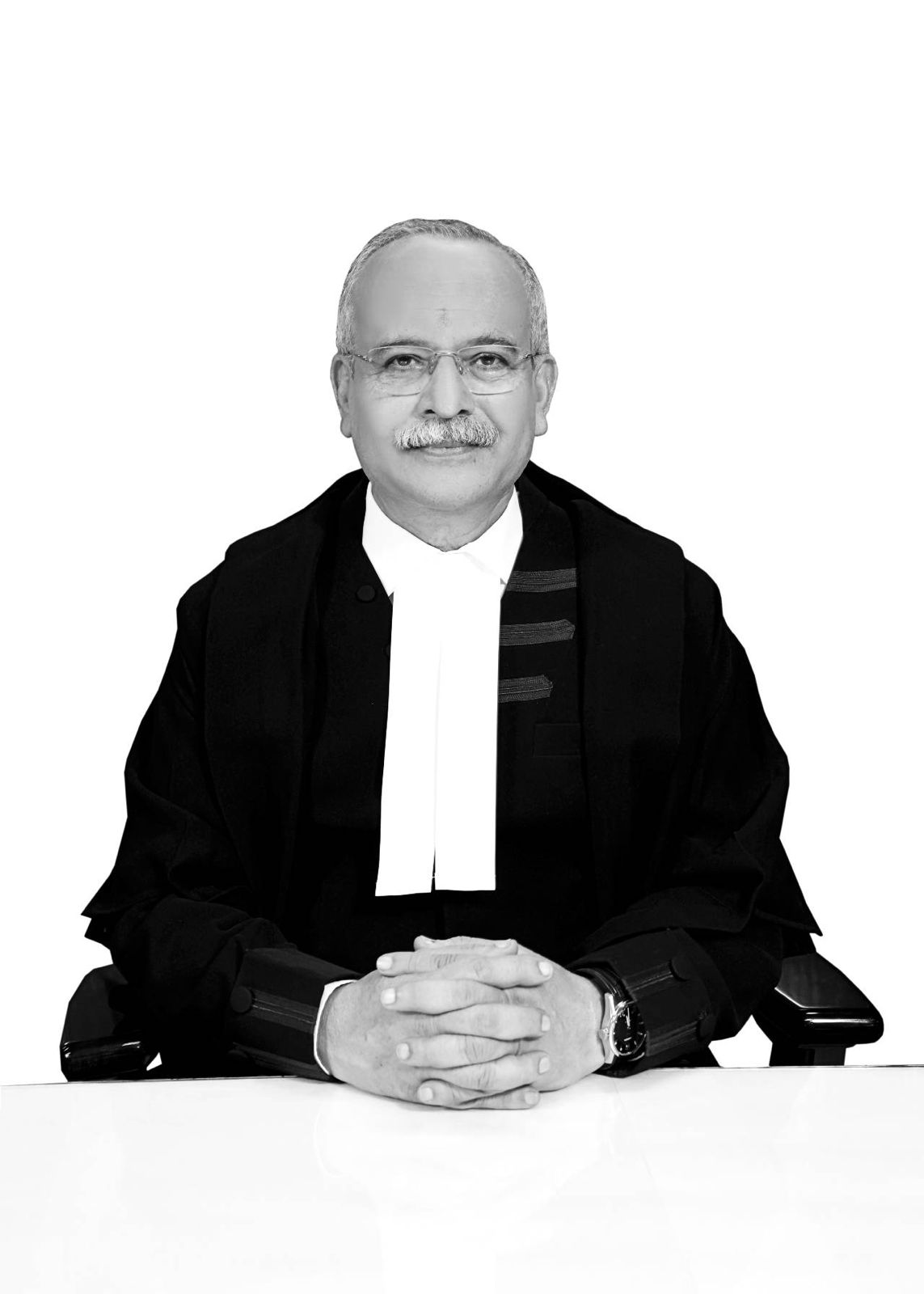

Judge of Supreme Court of India
- Incumbent
- Assumed office 9 November 2023
- Nominated by: D. Y. Chandrachud
- Appointed by: Droupadi Murmu

32nd Chief Justice of Delhi High Court
- In office 28 June 2022 – 8 November 2023
- Nominated by: N. V. Ramana
- Appointed by: Ram Nath Kovind
- Preceded by: D. N. Patel; Vipin Sanghi (acting)
- Succeeded by: Manmohan

4th Chief Justice of Telangana High Court
- In office 11 October 2021 – 27 June 2022
- Nominated by: N. V. Ramana
- Appointed by: Ram Nath Kovind
- Preceded by: Hima Kohli; M. S. R. Rao (acting)
- Succeeded by: Ujjal Bhuyan

Judge of Karnataka High Court
- In office 4 January 2021 – 10 October 2021
- Nominated by: S. A. Bobde
- Appointed by: Ram Nath Kovind
- Acting Chief Justice
- In office 31 August 2021 – 10 October 2021
- Appointed by: Ram Nath Kovind
- Preceded by: A. S. Oka
- Succeeded by: Ritu Raj Awasthi

Judge of Madhya Pradesh High Court
- In office 18 January 2008 – 3 January 2021
- Nominated by: K. G. Balakrishnan
- Appointed by: Pratibha Patil

Personal details
- Born: 30 November 1961 (age 64) Bhopal, Madhya Pradesh, India
- Education: B.Sc and LL.B
- Alma mater: Dr. Hari Singh Gour University
- Website: Supreme Court of India

Satish Chandra Sharma (born 30 November 1961) is a judge of the Supreme Court of India. He is a former chief justice of the Delhi High Court and Telangana High Court. He has also served as the acting chief justice of the Karnataka High Court and judge of the Karnataka High Court and Madhya Pradesh High Court.

== Career ==
Sharma enrolled as an advocate on 1 September 1984 and became one of the leading lawyers of Madhya Pradesh. In 2003, he was designated as a Senior Advocate by the High Court of Madhya Pradesh at the young age of 42 being one of the youngest senior advocates of Madhya Pradesh High Court. He practiced in constitutional, service, civil and criminal matters in the High Court of Madhya Pradesh.

He was elevated as an additional judge of the Madhya Pradesh High Court on 18 January 2008 and permanent on 15 January 2010. He was transferred as judge of the Karnataka High Court on 31 December 2020 and took oath on 4 January 2021. Sharma was later appointed acting chief justice of the Karnataka High Court on 31 August 2021 consequent upon the appointment of A. S. Oka as a judge of Supreme Court of India. He was elevated as chief justice of the Telangana High Court on 11 October 2021. He was transferred as chief justice of the Delhi High Court on 28 June 2022.

== Education ==
Sharma graduated with a Bachelor of Science degree in 1981 with distinction in three subjects. He was awarded National Merit Scholarship for Post Graduate Studies. He enrolled as a student of law in Dr. Hari Singh Gour University, Sagar in 1981. Graduated on top of the class and obtained a Bachelor of Laws degree in 1984 with three university Gold Medals.

== Family ==
His father, Dr. B N Sharma apart from being an agriculturalist, was also an eminent academic who served as a professor of Jabalpur University and as the Vice Chancellor of Barkatullah University. His mother, Shrimati Shanti Sharma was a principal at Maharani Lakshmibai Higher Secondary school and also worked as district education officer at Jabalpur before retirement.

== Further information ==
Sharma is on the advisory board of Law Journal published by National Law Institute University, Bhopal.
