= Dinesh Maheshwari =

Indian judge (born 1958)

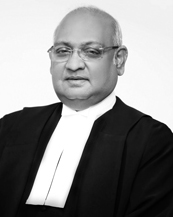

Chairman, 23rd Law Commission of India
- Incumbent
- Assumed office 15 April 2025
- Appointed by: Droupadi Murmu
- Prime Minister: Narendra Modi

Judge of Supreme Court of India
- In office 18 January 2019 – 14 May 2023
- Nominated by: Ranjan Gogoi
- Appointed by: Ram Nath Kovind

29th Chief Justice of Karnataka High Court
- In office 12 February 2018 – 17 January 2019
- Nominated by: Dipak Misra
- Appointed by: Ram Nath Kovind
- Preceded by: S. K. Mukherjee; H. G. Ramesh (acting)
- Succeeded by: A. S. Oka; L. N. Swamy (acting)

4th Chief Justice of Meghalaya High Court
- In office 24 February 2016 – 11 February 2018
- Nominated by: T. S. Thakur
- Appointed by: Pranab Mukherjee
- Preceded by: Uma Nath Singh; T. Nanda Kumar Singh (acting); Sudip Ranjan Sen (acting)
- Succeeded by: Tarun Agarwala

Judge of Allahabad High Court
- In office 19 July 2014 – 23 February 2016
- Nominated by: H. L. Dattu
- Appointed by: Pranab Mukherjee

Judge of Rajasthan High Court
- In office 2 September 2004 – 18 July 2014
- Nominated by: V. N. Khare
- Appointed by: A.P.J.Abdul Kalam

Personal details
- Born: 15 May 1958 (age 68) Udaipur, Rajasthan, India
- Spouse: Smt. Suman Maheshwari
- Children: 2
- Parent(s): Sh. Ramesh Chandra Maheshwari and Smt. Rukmani Maheshwari
- Education: Rajasthan University

Dinesh Maheshwari (born 15 May 1958) is a former Judge of the Supreme Court of India. He is a former Chief Justice of the Karnataka High Court & High Court of Meghalaya.

== Early life and education ==
Maheshwari was born on 15 May 1958. His father Ramesh Chandra Maheshwari was a lawyer at Rajasthan High Court, Jodhpur. He completed his graduation in B.Sc. (Hons.) in physics from Maharaja's College, University of Rajasthan, Jaipur. He graduated in law from Jodhpur University in 1980 and enrolled as an advocate on 8 March 1981.

== Career ==
After a practice and experience of about 23 years as a lawyer he was elevated and appointed a judge of the Rajasthan High Court and took the oath on 2 September 2004. He was transferred to the Allahabad High Court on 19 July 2014 and remained senior Judge at the Lucknow Bench of Allahabad High Court from 2 March 2015. He took oath as Chief Justice of the High Court of Meghalaya on 24 February 2016. On transfer to Karnataka, Justice Maheshwari took oath as 29th Chief Justice of High Court of Karnataka on 12 February 2018. He took oath as Judge of the Supreme Court of India on 18 January 2019.

Maheshwari wrote a majority opinion in Janhit Abhiyan v Union of India, holding that the 103rd Amendment to the Constitution did not violate the basic structure, and upholding reservations for Economically Weaker Sections.

Post retirement he was appointed as chairman of 23rd Law Commission of India in 2025.
