= Nilay Anjaria =

Indian judge (born 1965)

Hon'ble Justice Nilay Vipinchandra Anjaria
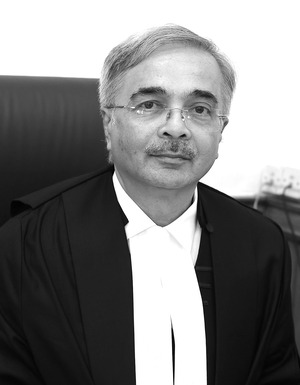

Judge of the Supreme Court of India
- Incumbent
- Assumed office 30 May 2025
- Nominated by: B. R. Gavai
- Appointed by: Droupadi Murmu

34th Chief Justice of Karnataka High Court
- In office 25 February 2024 – 29 May 2025
- Nominated by: D. Y. Chandrachud
- Appointed by: Droupadi Murmu
- Preceded by: P. S. Dinesh Kumar
- Succeeded by: Vibhu Bakhru; V. Kameswar Rao (acting)

Judge of the Gujarat High Court
- In office 21 November 2011 – 24 February 2024
- Nominated by: S. H. Kapadia
- Appointed by: Pratibha Patil

Personal details
- Born: 23 March 1965 (age 61) Ahmedabad
- Education: L.L.B, L.L.M
- Alma mater: L.A. Shah Law College, H. L. College of Commerce, University School of Law

Nilay Vipinchandra Anjaria (born 23 March 1965) is a judge of the Supreme Court of India. He has served as the 34th chief justice of the Karnataka High Court. He is former judge of the Gujarat High Court. He is also the Visitor of Gujarat National Law University.

== Early life and education ==
Anjaria was born on 23 March 1965 at Ahmedabad. He is native of Mandvi in Kachchh and belongs to family of lawyers as his father was also in judiciary. He graduated from H. L. College of Commerce at Ahmedabad and did L.L.B from Sir L.A. Shah Law College, Ahmedabad in 1988 and in 1990 he obtained master's degree in law (L.L.M) from University School of Law in Ahmedabad.

== Career ==
He started practising law in Gujarat High Court from August 1988 by joining the chamber of Senior Advocate S. N. Shelat. He practiced in matters involving constitutional issues and all categories of civil, labour and service cases.

He has served as a senior panel counsel for CBI, and Senior Standing Counsel for BSNL, UPSC, UGC, AICTE, and NCTE.

He was elevated as additional judge of the Gujarat High Court on 21 November 2011 and was confirmed as permanent judge on 6 September 2013. He was transferred and elevated as chief justice of the Karnataka High Court, taking oath of that office on 25 February 2024.

On 26 May 2025, the Supreme Court collegium led by CJI Bhushan Ramkrishna Gavai recommended his appointment as a judge of Supreme Court of India. Central government cleared this recommendation and he took oath as a Supreme Court Judge on 30 May 2025.
