= High Court of Karnataka (Dharwad Bench) =

Bench of the High Court in Karnataka, India

High Court of Karnataka, Dharwad Bench
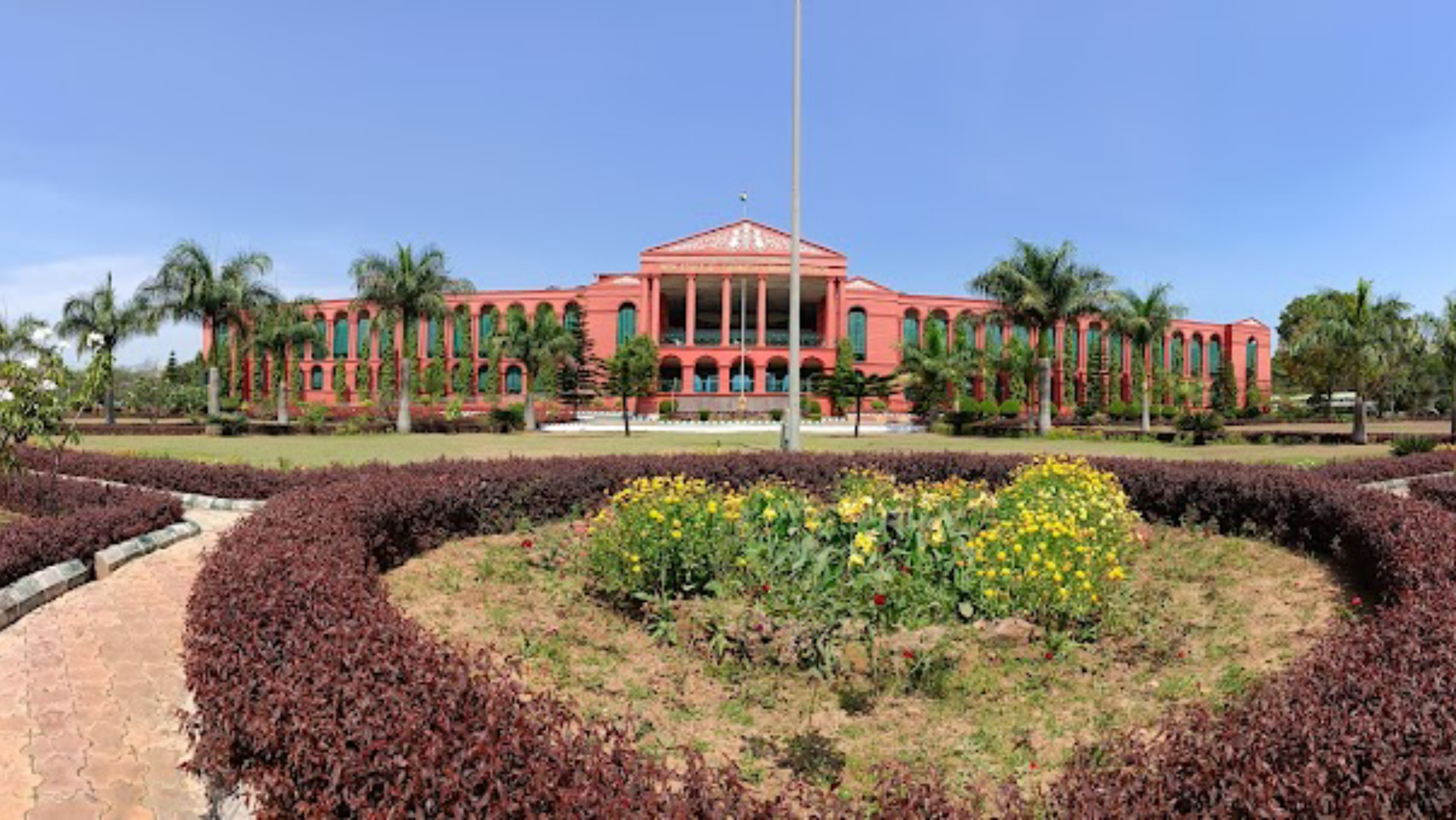
- The High court building
- Established: 24 August 2013; 12 years ago
- Location: Dharwad, Karnataka, India
- Composition method: Permanent bench; Presidential appointment on advice of the Chief Justice of India and the Governor of Karnataka
- Authorised by: Constitution of India
- Appeals to: Supreme Court of India
- Judge term length: Mandatory retirement at age 62
- Number of positions: 5 (sanctioned)
- Language: Kannada, English
- Website: karnatakajudiciary.kar.nic.in

High Court of Karnataka (Dharwad Bench) is a permanent bench of the Karnataka High Court, located in Dharwad serving the northern districts of Karnataka, India. Established on 24 August 2013, it addresses decades of public demand for improved judicial access. The bench exercises jurisdiction over eight districts and has been recognised as a "probo bono publico" measure that increased legal awareness and case filling in North Karnataka.

== History ==
Advocacy for judicial access in the North Karnataka extends to at least 1979, when Chief Justice D. M. Chandrasekhar recommended establishing a bench at Dharwad recognizing hardships caused by Bengaluru's southeastern location. The 425 to 613 kilometres distance to northern district centers imposed substantial burdens on litigants and practitioners and legal profession organized collective action, including boycotts of court proceedings, to highlight systemic inequities.

By 1999, Karnataka's state government formally supported establishing a permanent bench at Dharwad-Hubli. However, the proposed stalled without the Chief Justice's endorsement, which was required by policy. In 2000, the Union Ministry of Law and Justice confirmed the state's support but noted the lack of Karnataka High Court endorsement.

== Circuit bench to permanent status ==
A circuit bench was established at Dharwad on 7 July 2008. Caseload from eight northern districts tripled from 21,000 to nearly 60,000 in four years, intensifying demands for permanent status. In March 2013, the Union Minister confirmed the necessary governmental and judicial approvals has been secured. The Union Cabinet approved establishment on 4 June 2013, the Presidential order was issued on 14 August 2013. The bench became operational on 24 August 2013 and was inaugurated by Justice H. L. Dattu, a supreme court judge with Karnataka High Court D. H. Waghela presiding.

== Jurisdiction ==
As per the 2013 Presidential order, the bench exercises over eight districts: Bagalkot, Belagavi, Ballari, Dharwad, Gadag, Haveri, Koppal, and Uttara Kannada The Chief Justice of Karnataka may order any case arising in these districts to be heard at the principal Bengaluru bench.

== Infrastructure ==
The Government of Karnataka constructed a court complex at ₹108.24 crores, including court halls and residential quarters. The bench was sanctioned 190 administrative positions.

== Operations ==
In December 2018, the bench held court during judicial vacation for the first time, eliminating the requirement for litigants to travel to Bengaluru during vacations.

A 2023 Karnataka High Court judgement upholding the bench's establishment noted it as a "pro bono publico" measure that created legal awareness and "brought the court to their doorsteps". Pending cases grew from 20,766 (18,401 civil; 2,365 criminal) in 2008 to 58,586 (51,946 civil; 6,640 criminal) by February 2023, demonstrating increased access to justice and speedy, qualitative justice delivery.

The Dharwad Bench operates under the Chief Justice of Karnataka's administrative control. As of 2025, Justice Vibhu Bakhru served as the Chief Justice of Karnataka High Court, appointed on 19 July 2025.

== Notable judgements ==
- In 2026, the bench directed the Union government to protect the inheritance rights of 'class I' heirs particularly daughters, under the amended Hindu Succession Act, emphasizing the need to remove legal obstacles preventing them from claiming their share in ancestral properties.
- In 2016, the bench dismissed the bail please of former minister and mining magnate G. Janardhana Reddy in case registered by the Central Bureau of Investigation.

== See also ==
- High Court of Karnataka (Kalaburagi Bench)
- Judiciary of India
