= Suraj Govindaraj =

Judge of Karnataka High Court

Hon'ble Mr. Justice Suraj Govindaraj

Judge of Karnataka High Court
- Incumbent
- Assumed office 23 September 2019
- Nominated by: [[Ranjam Gogoi; Sharad Arvind Bobde; N V Ramana]]
- Appointed by: Ram Nath Kovind

Judge of Karnataka High Court

Personal details
- Born: Suraj Govindaraj; 14 May 1973 (age 53) Bangalore, Karnataka, India
- Spouse: Vinitha Suraj
- Children: Shravanthi; Vishnu Arya
- Parent(s): V Govindaraj; Surya Prabha
- Education: National Law School of India University, MES College of Arts, Science and Commerce

Suraj Govindaraj (born 14 May 1973) is an additional judge of the High Court of Karnataka, in India, and he took the oath on 23 September 2019 and was appointed as Permanent Judge on 1 March 2021.

He has practiced in the field of Civil, Commercial Litigation, Contracts, Property Law, Arbitration, Company Law, Intellectual Property Rights, Constitution Matters, Debt Recovery, Environmental Law, Revenue Matters under local land laws, Consumer Law, RERA among others.
