= University Law College, Bangalore University =

Public law school

University Law College, Bengaluru
- Type: Public / Government
- Established: 1 July 1948; 77 years ago
- Affiliations: Bangalore University
- Principal: Dr. V. Sudesh
- Dean: Dr. Dasharath
- Location: University Law College, Bangalore University, Jnana Bharathi Campus, Bangalore - 560 056., Bengaluru, Karnataka, India; 12°58′25.46″N 77°34′51.4″E
- Campus: Urban
- Nickname: ULC, Bangalore
- Website: Official website

The University Law College, Bangalore University, popularly known as ULC - Bangalore, is a legal education institution located in the city of Bengaluru, Karnataka, India.

== Administration ==
=== Bangalore University ===
ULC is administered and maintained by the Bangalore University (BU), which was started originally in 1886 at Central College, later given status of Degree awarding body through its own name in July 1964 under the Mysore Act No.26, later replaced by the Karnataka State Universities Act. The university offers a wide range of curricular options encompassing 9 faculties which include both traditional as well as modern intellectual disciplines. With as many as 600 affiliated Colleges, 75 Post-Graduate Departments, more than 360,000 students pursuing undergraduate programs and 7,362 students specializing in postgraduate studies, the Bangalore University has grown to be recognized as one of the largest universities in Asia. The Bangalore University has been accredited by the National Assessment and Accreditation Council (NAAC) in 2001 and awarded Five Star Status. The university is a member of the Association of Indian Universities (AIU), and has also received the recognition of University Grants Commission (UGC).

=== Faculty of Law ===
The Faculty of Law of Bangalore University offers courses both at UG and PG level. The University Law College (ULC) is the only constituent college of law directly administered by the Bangalore University. Senior Prof Dr V Sudesh is the Dean for the faculty of law DEc. 2023 onwards. ULC hosts a few well-qualified and experienced faculty and a resourceful administrative staff.

=== Campus ===
From the early days of its inception, ULC was situated in the Central College Campus of Bangalore University, close to the legislative and highest judicial seat of the State. However, at the beginning of the academic year 2006-07, ULC shifted from the heritage campus to a new spacious building situated in the Jnana Bharathi Campus of Bangalore University, which is located on 1,100 acres (4.5 km^{2}) of land close to the Kengeri suburb of Bangalore. This new facility hosts eight class rooms where formal teaching sessions are conducted for both B.A., LL.B. and LL.M. programmes, two seminar halls, an independent library and an administrative block with chambers for the principal, the chairman and dean, and all teaching faculty members. The Bangalore University canteen and other shared facilities are located close by. This new eco-friendly campus is also equipped with rain water harvesting system. In addition to these facilities, though ULC is a non-residential law college, separate hostel facilities are available for male and female students within the Jnana Bharathi campus of Bangalore University.

== History ==
=== Early history ===
The erstwhile Government of Mysore (now the State of Karnataka) started the college in the year 1948. It was previously known as the Bangalore Government Law College. Prof. Narayan Rao was the first principal of the college. From 1964, ULC was brought under the Faculty of Law of Bangalore University. ULC started with a two-year course, and later offered a three-year postgraduate LL.B. program till 1986.

=== Pioneering the 5-year integrated B.A.L., LL.B. program ===
In 1982, Prof Dr V.B. Coutinho became the principal of ULC. During his term, the college emphatically transformed into one of the first professional law colleges in the country by introducing the five-year integrated B.A.L., LL.B. program for the first time, in the academic year 1986–87. This was an initiative to achieve higher standards in legal education. A few years thereafter, the Committee on Subordinate Legislation of the 10th Lok Sabha, the Committee of Judges on Legal Education appointed by the chief justice of India in 1993, and the All India Law Ministers Conference in 1994 unanimously recommended the adoption of the five year LL.B. program as the course for professional legal education.

== The ULC experience ==
=== Academia ===
At present, ULC offers:

- the five-year integrated Bachelor of Laws (B.A. LL.B.)(Hons) program, a semester program with 60 students admitted each year; and
- the two-year specialized Master of Laws (LL.M.) program in 5 different branches, with an intake of 12 students per branch (Criminal Law - Business Law - Constitution and Legal Order - Labour, Capital & Law - Environmental Law)

== Student activities ==
=== NSS ===
The National Service Scheme is an Indian government-sponsored programme under the Department of Youth Affairs and Sports of the Government of India. ULC established a NSS unit in 2008, with about a hundred student-volunteers. The NSS unit at ULC has been actively involved in many social service activities in rural areas and has organized blood donation camps. NSS volunteers have also contributed towards the eco-friendly theme of the new campus by enriching the greenery in the campus with many plants. Dr Sathish Gowda N, Associate Professor, served actively as NSS Programme Officer since 2008. Currently, Associate Professor Dr Chandrakanti L is the NSS Programme Officer at ULC.

=== All India Moot Court Competition ===
The annual national level moot court competition hosted by ULC is the flagship activity of the student body, the Society of Mooters. The competition attracts participants from law colleges all across the country. The justices of the High Court of Karnataka preside over the finals of the moot court competition. The twenty seventh edition of the All India Moot Court Competition of ULC will be held in June 2023.

=== Sports activities ===
ULC regularly organizes annual sports day and other sporting events such as intra-collegiate football, basketball and cricket tournaments for both boys and girls.

=== Cultural and literary festivals ===
ULC also hosts an annual inter-collegiate literary and cultural festival, in addition to a host of intra-college cultural activities. Having successfully organized such festivals in the past under different names, ULC continues this tradition with its law festival called Jus Celebre.

== Notable alumni ==
ULC Notable alumni include:

- M. N. Venkatachaliah, former chief justice of India; former chairman of National Human Rights Commission (NHRC) (1996–1998); former chairman of the Constitution Review Committee (1999); and a recipient of the Padma Vibhushan (2004).
- N. Venkatachala, former Judge of the Supreme Court of India (1992–1995), and former Karnataka Lokayukta.
- N. Santosh Hegde, the present Karnataka Lokayukta, and former Judge of the Supreme Court of India (1999–2005).
- R.V. Raveendran, judge, Supreme Court of India (October 2005 – present) and former chief justice, High Court of Madhya Pradesh.
- S. M. Krishna, Hon'ble Minister for External Affairs, India (23 May 2009 – present) and a member of parliament (MP) from Karnataka in the Rajya Sabha; former governor of the State of Maharashtra (12 Dec 2004 – 5 March 2008); and former chief minister of Karnataka (11 Oct 1999 – 28 May 2004).
- Veerappa Moily, Union Law Minister, India (28 May 2009 – present); chairman of 2nd Administrative Reforms Commission of India; and former chief minister of Karnataka(19 Nov 1992 – 11 Dec 1994).
- Margaret Alva, Her Excellency, Hon'ble Governor of Uttarakhand (July 2009 – present).
- S. Bangarappa, former chief minister of Karnataka (1990–1992).

== Law in action ==
In the recent past, ULC has, through Bangalore University, partnered with University of Paris X-Nanterre for exchange of faculty and students. Over the last few decades, ULC has evolved to be more diverse and its student activities more varied. Building on a strong foundation and a rich tradition, ULC has transformed into a law college of choice for many aspiring lawyers.
