= P. B. Bajanthri =

Indian judge (born 1963)

Hon'ble Chief Justice (Retd.) Pavankumar Bhimappa Bajanthri

46th Chief Justice of Patna High Court
- In office 21 September 2025 – 22 October 2025
- Nominated by: B. R. Gavai
- Appointed by: Droupadi Murmu
- Preceded by: Vipul Pancholi
- Succeeded by: Sudhir Singh (acting); Sangam Kumar Sahoo

Judge of Patna High Court
- In office 20 October 2021 – 20 September 2025; Acting CJ : 29 August 2025 - 20 September 2025
- Nominated by: N. V. Ramana
- Appointed by: Ram Nath Kovind

Judge of Karnataka High Court
- In office 17 November 2018 – 19 October 2021
- Nominated by: Ranjan Gogoi
- Appointed by: Ram Nath Kovind
- In office 2 January 2015 – 15 March 2015
- Nominated by: H. L. Dattu
- Appointed by: Pranab Mukherjee

Judge of Punjab and Haryana High Court
- In office 16 March 2015 – 16 November 2018
- Nominated by: H. L. Dattu
- Appointed by: Pranab Mukherjee

Personal details
- Born: 23 October 1963 (age 62)
- Education: S.J.R.C. Law College, Bangalore

Pavankumar Bhimappa Bajanthri (born 23 October 1963) is a retired Indian judge who served as the Chief Justice of the Patna High Court in the state of Bihar. He is also a former judge of the Karnataka High Court and Punjab and Haryana High Court.

== Early life and career ==
Justice Bajanthri was born on 23 October 1963. He completed his education from Vidhyavardhaka Sangha, K.L.E. Society and S.J.R.C. Law College, Bangalore. He was enrolled as an advocate in 1990.

He practiced as an advocate in the Karnataka High Court, Karnataka Administrative Tribunal, Central Administrative Tribunal and educational authorities. He was also appointed as Notary by the Central Government in May 2006

He was as appointed as Additional Judge of Karnataka High Court on 2 January 2015. Shortly thereafter he was transferred as Additional Judge of Punjab and Haryana High Court and was made permanent on 31 December 2016. He was repatriated to Karnataka High Court on 17 November 2018 and was again transferred to Patna High Court on 20 August 2021 and has been serving there since. He was appointed Acting Chief Justice of the same High court consequent upon the elevation of the then Chief Justice Vipul Pancholi to Supreme Court of India on 28 August 2025.

On 11 September 2025 Supreme Court Collegium led by CJI B. R. Gavai recommended him to be appointed as Chief Justice of the same High Court. Took oath as Chief Justice of the Patna High Court on 21 September 2025. He is also first Dalit person to hold top judicial post in Patna High Court. His tenure of 32 days as Chief Justice is third shortest in the history of Patna High Court only behind 1 day tenure of Justice Bhagwati Prasad Jha and 5 day tenure of Justice Sushil Kumar Jha.
