= K. H. N. Kuranga =

Indian judge (born 1942)

Hon'ble Chief Justice (Retd.) K. H. N. Kuranga

2nd Chief Justice of Chhattisgarh High Court
- In office 6 February 2002 – 10 May 2004
- Nominated by: S. P. Bharucha
- Appointed by: K. R. Narayanan
- Preceded by: W. A. Shishak; Fakhruddin (acting)
- Succeeded by: A. S. V. Moorthy; Fakhruddin (acting)

Judge of Karnataka High Court
- In office 22 February 1993 – 5 February 2002
- Nominated by: L. M. Sharma
- Appointed by: S. D. Sharma

Personal details
- Born: 11 May 1942 (age 83)

Korategere Hanumanthayya Narasimha Kuranga (born 11 May 1942) is an Indian Advocate, retired Chief Justice of Chhattisgarh High Court and former judge of Karnataka High Court.

== Early life and career ==
Justice Kuranga hails from Tumkur district and started practising in the Bangalore Bar after enrolling as an Advocate on 17 May 1968. He worked as high court pleader in 1975 and was appointed as additional state public prosecutor in 1985.

He became Judge of Karnataka High Court on 22 February 1993 to February 2002. On 6 February 2002 he became second Chief Justice of Chhattisgarh High Court and served in this role until May 2004.

In 2011 he was tipped to be the Lokayukta of Karnataka when the then Governor of Karnataka was in disagreement with the govt's proposal of appointing S. R. Bannurmath as lokayukta but subsequently Y. Bhaskar Rao was appointed to head this coveted post.
