= Ritu Raj Awasthi =

Chairperson of 22nd Law Commission of India

Hon'ble Chief Justice (Retd.) Ritu Raj Awasthi

Judicial Member of Lokpal
- Incumbent
- Assumed office 27 March 2024
- Appointed by: Droupadi Murmu
- Chairperson: Ajay Manikrao Khanwilkar

Chairman of 22nd Law Commission of India
- In office 9 November 2022 – 26 March 2024
- Appointed by: Droupadi Murmu
- Prime Minister: Narendra Modi

31st Chief Justice of Karnataka High Court
- In office 11 October 2021 – 2 July 2022
- Nominated by: N. V. Ramana
- Appointed by: Ram Nath Kovind
- Preceded by: Abhay Shreeniwas Oka; Satish Chandra Sharma (acting)
- Succeeded by: Prasanna B. Varale; Alok Aradhe (acting)

Judge of Allahabad High Court
- In office 13 April 2009 – 10 October 2021
- Nominated by: K. G. Balakrishnan
- Appointed by: Pratibha Patil

Personal details
- Born: 3 July 1960 (age 66)
- Education: Lucknow University

Ritu Raj Awasthi (born 3 July 1960) is an Indian Judge. He is serving as the Chairperson of 22nd Law Commission of India from 9 November 2022 to 26 March 2024. He was Chief Justice of Karnataka High Court from 11 October 2021 to 2 July 2022. He was a Judge of Allahabad High Court from 13 April 2009 to 10 October 2021. Ritu Raj Awasthi was appointed as Law Commission chairperson on 7 November 2022 and served there till 26 March 2024. On 27 March he was appointed as Judicial Member of Lokpal and will serve there till 26 March 2029.

== Career ==
Born on 3 July 1960, he was graduated in the year 1980. He was enrolled as an Advocate on 1 February 1987. He has practiced in civil service and educational matters. He was elevated as an Additional Judge of Allahabad High Court on 13 April 2009 and took oath as Permanent Judge on 24 December 2010. He was elevated as Chief Justice of Karnataka High Court on 9 October 2021 and took oath on 11 October 2021. He retired on 2 July 2022. On 9 November 2022, he was appointed as the Chairperson of the 22nd Law Commission of India and served there till 26 March 2024. On 27 March he was appointed as Judicial Member of Lokpal and will serve there till 26 March 2029.
