= Jayant Banerji =

Judge of the Karnataka High Court

Hon'ble Justice Jayant Banerji

Judge of the Karnataka High Court
- Incumbent
- Assumed office 19 July 2025

Judge of the Allahabad High Court
- In office 22 September 2017 – 18 July 2025

Personal details
- Born: January 17, 1965 (age 61) India
- Education: University of Allahabad
- Occupation: Judge

Justice Jayant Banerji (born 17 January 1965) is an Indian judge who serves as a judge of the Karnataka High Court. He previously served as a judge of the Allahabad High Court.
