= Prasanna B. Varale =

Judge of the Supreme Court of India

Prasanna Bhalachandra Varale
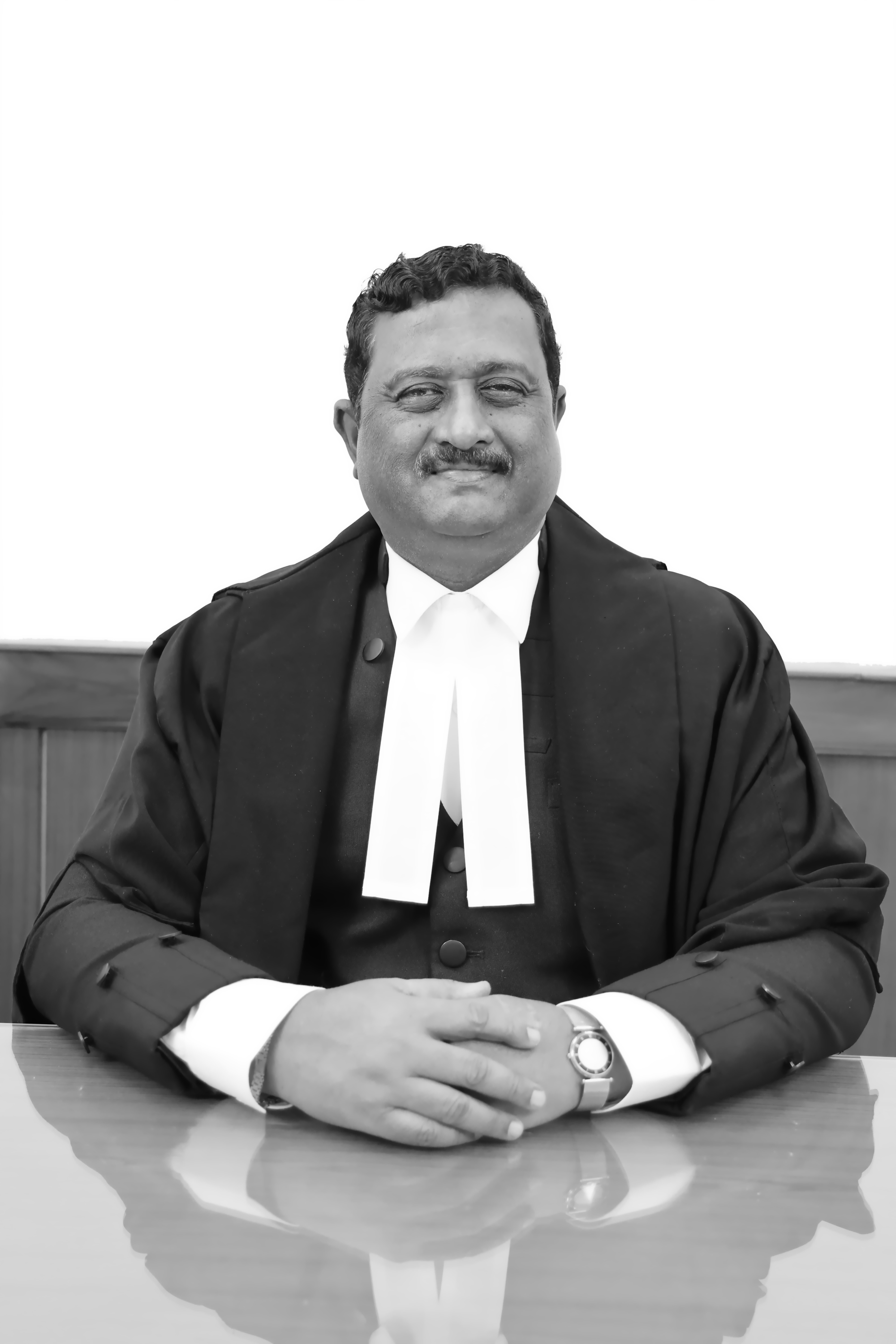

Judge of the Supreme Court of India
- Incumbent
- Assumed office 25 January 2024
- Nominated by: Dhananjaya Y. Chandrachud
- Appointed by: Droupadi Murmu

32nd Chief Justice of Karnataka High Court
- In office 15 October 2022 – 24 January 2024
- Nominated by: Uday Umesh Lalit
- Appointed by: Droupadi Murmu
- Preceded by: Ritu Raj Awasthi
- Succeeded by: P. S. Dinesh Kumar

Judge of the Bombay High Court
- In office 18 July 2008 – 14 October 2022
- Nominated by: K. G. Balakrishnan
- Appointed by: Pratibha Patil

Personal details
- Born: 23 June 1962 (age 64) Nipani, Mysore State, India
- Education: Dr. Babasaheb Ambedkar Marathwada University

Prasanna Bhalachandra Varale (born June 23, 1962) is a judge of the Supreme Court of India. He has previously served as chief justice of Karnataka High Court and as judge of the Bombay High Court.

== Early life ==
Varale was born on June 23, 1962, at Nipani. He graduated in arts and law from Dr. Babasaheb Ambedkar Marathwada University.

== Career ==
He enrolled as an advocate in 1985. He was appointed as an additional judge of the Bombay High Court on 18 July 2008, and made permanent on 15 July 2011. He was elevated to chief justice of the Karnataka High Court on 15 October 2022. He was elevated as a judge of the Supreme Court of India on 25 January 2024. With his elevation, the Supreme Court had 3 serving judges from the Scheduled Caste community for the first time in its history (the other two judges being BR Gavai and CT Ravikumar).
