= Ujjal Bhuyan =

Judge of the Supreme Court of India

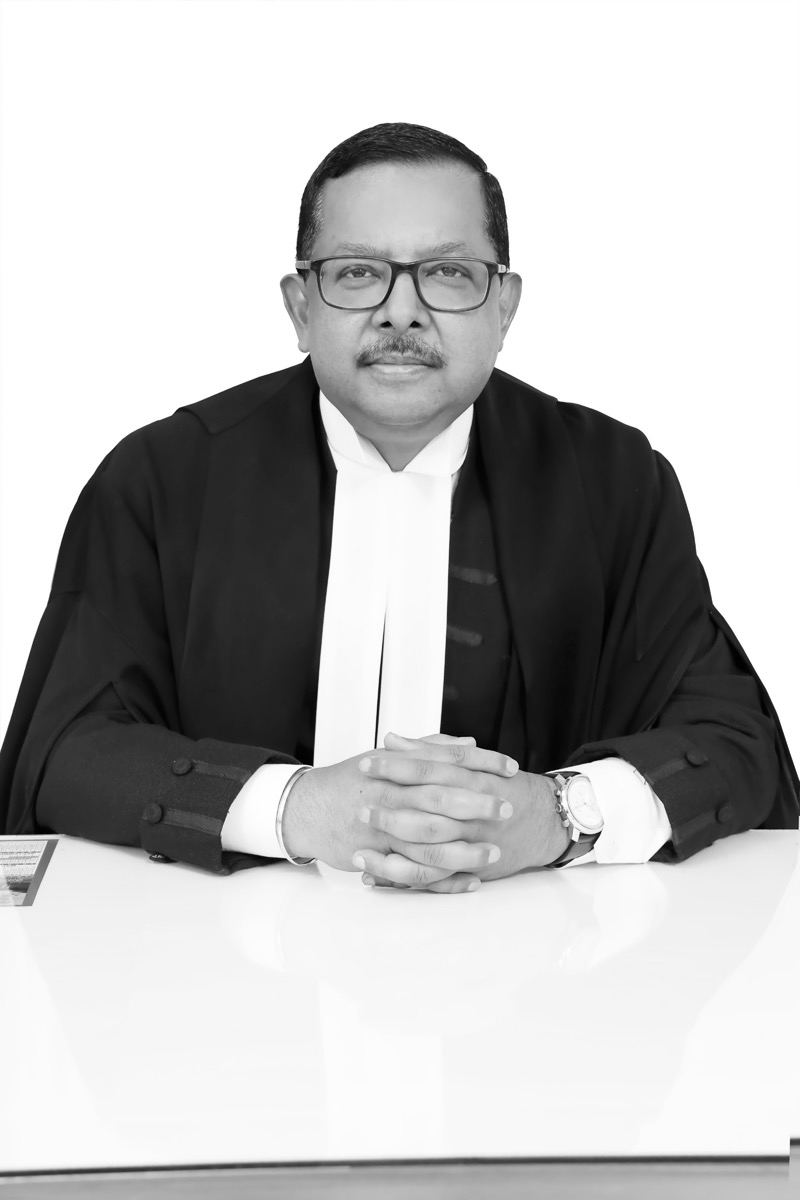

Judge of Supreme Court of India
- Incumbent
- Assumed office 14 July 2023
- Nominated by: D. Y. Chandrachud
- Appointed by: Droupadi Murmu

5th Chief Justice of Telangana High Court
- In office 28 June 2022 – 13 July 2023
- Nominated by: N. V. Ramana
- Appointed by: Ram Nath Kovind
- Preceded by: Satish Chandra Sharma
- Succeeded by: Alok Aradhe; P. Naveen Rao (acting); Abhinand Kumar Shavili (acting)

Judge of Telangana High Court
- In office 22 October 2021 – 27 June 2022
- Nominated by: N. V. Ramana
- Appointed by: Ram Nath Kovind

Judge of Bombay High Court
- In office 3 October 2019 – 21 October 2021
- Nominated by: Ranjan Gogoi
- Appointed by: Ram Nath Kovind

Judge of Gauhati High Court
- In office 17 October 2011 – 2 October 2019
- Nominated by: S. H. Kapadia
- Appointed by: Pratibha Patil

Personal details
- Born: 2 August 1964 (age 62) Guwahati
- Parent: Suchendra Nath Bhuyan
- Education: Don Bosco High School, Cotton College, Guwahati, Gauhati University

Ujjal Bhuyan (born 2 August 1964) is a judge of the Supreme Court of India. He is a former chief justice of the Telangana High Court. He has also served as judge of the Telangana High Court, Bombay High Court and Gauhati High Court.

== Early life and education ==
Justice Bhuyan was born on 2 August 1964 at Guwahati. He is the son of Suchendra Nath Bhuyan, former Advocate General of Assam. He did his schooling in Don Bosco High School, Guwahati, and studied in Cotton College, Guwahati. He completed his Bachelor of Arts from Kirori Mal College. He obtained his Bachelor of Laws degree from Government Law College in Guwahati and his Master of Laws degree from Gauhati University.

== Career ==
He was enrolled with the Bar Council of Assam, Nagaland, Meghalaya, Manipur, Tripura, Mizoram and Arunachal Pradesh on 20 March 1991. On 6 September 2010, he was designated as senior advocate by Gauhati High Court. He was appointed as additional advocate general, Assam on 21 July 2011. He was elevated as an additional judge of the Gauhati High Court on 17 October 2011 and made a permanent judge on 20 March 2013. He was transferred as a judge of the Bombay High Court on 3 October 2019. He was transferred as a judge of the Telangana High Court on 22 October 2021. He was elevated as chief justice of the Telangana High Court on 28 June 2022 and appointed a judge of the Supreme Court of India on 14 July 2023.
