= A. S. Oka =

Indian judge (born 1960)

Abhay Shreeniwas Oka
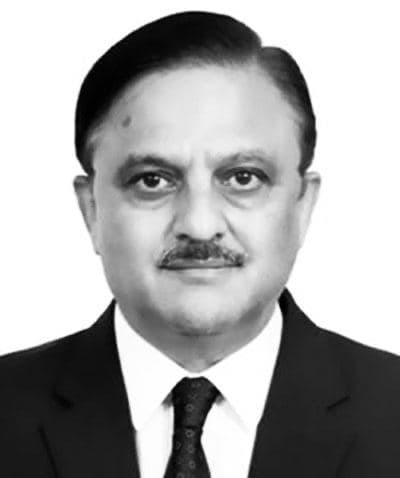

Judge of the Supreme Court of India
- In office 31 August 2021 – 24 May 2025
- Nominated by: N. V. Ramana
- Appointed by: Ram Nath Kovind

30th Chief Justice of the Karnataka High Court
- In office 10 May 2019 – 30 August 2021
- Nominated by: Ranjan Gogoi
- Appointed by: Ram Nath Kovind
- Preceded by: Dinesh Maheshwari; Lingappa Narayana Swamy (acting)
- Succeeded by: Ritu Raj Awasthi; Satish Chandra Sharma (acting)

Judge of the Bombay High Court
- In office 29 August 2003 – 9 May 2019
- Nominated by: V. N. Khare
- Appointed by: A. P. J. Abdul Kalam

Personal details
- Born: 25 May 1960 (age 66) India
- Education: Government Law College, Mumbai; Mumbai University

Abhay Shreeniwas Oka (born 25 May 1960) is a retired Indian judge of the Supreme Court of India, and former chief justice of two high courts of India: Karnataka High Court and Bombay High Court.

== Career ==
Oka was born on 25 May 1960 and enrolled as an advocate on 28 June 1983. He practiced for 19 years at the Bombay High Court, appellate side, in civil, constitutional, and service matters, specializing in all of them.

He was appointed an additional judge of the Bombay High Court on 29 August 2003 and a permanent judge on 12 November 2005.

He was appointed chief justice of the Karnataka High Court on 30 April 2019 and sworn in on 10 May 2019.

Oka was elevated as a judge of the Supreme Court of India on 26 August 2021 and took oath on 31 August 2021.
