= Don Bosco High School, Guwahati =

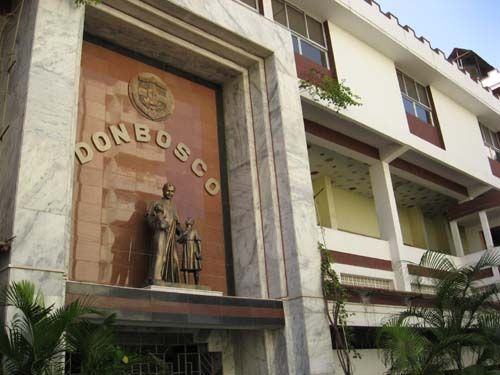

Location
- Panbazar; Guwahati; India; 26.185126°N 91.745929°E

Information
- Type: Private
- Motto: Virtus et Scientia (Latin; Virtue and Knowledge)
- Established: 1948; 78 years ago
- Founder: Salesians of Don Bosco
- Principal: Fr. Alex Mathew, sdb
- Enrollment: 3000
- Houses: Bezbaruah; Bordoloi; Lachit; Phukan
- Affiliation: Central Board of Secondary Education
- Website: www.donboscoguwahati.net

Don Bosco Senior Secondary School is a school located in Guwahati, Assam. It is a Catholic school founded on the teachings of Saint John Bosco, and is run by the Salesians of Don Bosco. Started in 1948, Don Bosco is one of the leading private schools in the North-Eastern states. It operates 12 standards, divided into primary, middle, senior and senior secondary sections. The school is managed by a Principal, with Vice Principals and Teacher-Coordinators operating under him. The school houses 3000 students.

== History ==
=== Predecessor ===
Our Lady’s Orphanage, a school for boys of the Assam plains was the predecessor of the current high school. It inaugurated on 24 May 1926, by Rt. Rev. Mgr. Mathias S.C.D.D., Prefect Apostolic of Assam. At the time, a residence and a workshop were constructed. The technical school began in 1928 with 12 students. It then grew into two large workshops with 200 students by 1938. The name Our Lady’s Orphanage was then changed to Don Bosco Technical School, Guwahati. In 1937, the school operated classes I to IV. During the Second World War, it was taken over by the army in June 1942 and the school was closed.

=== Current school ===
In February 1948, at an inaugural ceremony presided over by Dr. Bhubaneswar Barua, the school was restarted with an enrollment of 92 students in five classes from III to VII. Mr. Har Mohan Das was the headmaster and the first principal was Rev. Fr. Attilio Colussi.

The opening of Class VIII was approved by the director of public instruction in February 1948. The school was affiliated to Gauhati University in 1951 and its candidates were permitted to appear for matriculation in the year 1952, when 9 out of 12 students of the Tenth Standard appeared and eight succeeded. Mr. Nirmal Kumar Choudhury, former Vice Chancellor of Gauhati University, was one of them. Parts of the school buildings were used by Assam Civil Engineering School prior to 1948 and by Gauhati University in 1948. Public demand in 1958 led to the beginning of the English section from Class VIII with required permission from the University. Class IV, V and VI in the English section started in 1962.

In 1980, the pre-primary and primary sections were opened. With the addition of pre-primary and primary sections, the school grew in size and status. It was the first school in the North-East to have computer education (which began in 1987), an auditorium and sports complex (1993), and a meteorological observatory center (2002).

Under the leadership of the then headmaster Fr. Joseph M. Thelekkatt, the school management drew up plans for an extension block – known as the Centenary Block – to commemorate 100 years (1906–2006) of Don Bosco Society's services in India. The new block comprised both an Academic Section composed of more classrooms and a sports and culture section.

The transformation of the school infrastructure with the Centenary block

The primary school curriculum and teaching methods were revamped. The teachers of the primary school underwent workshops to familiarize them with child centered and activity oriented teaching methods. Further the school sought and obtained affiliation under the central Board of Secondary Education. Since 2006 the school is affiliated to the CBSE board. The first batch of students was scheduled to appear for the Central Board examinations in 2009.The first batch of Kindergarten appeared in 2010. The school has created a resource centre in view of providing the campus with WiFi. The school administration software "Campuscare" has automated the school offices, Library and school administration.

=== Coeducation ===
Don Bosco School was an all-boys school, but has started to move towards coeducation. The senior secondary section already admits both boys and girls. The first batch of female students in the youngest grades of Kindergarten and Class I were admitted in 2010 and Don Bosco is a co-ed school now.

=== Milestones ===
1922–1953

- 1922 – Arrival of the Salesian Missionaries. Establishment of Don Bosco Centre in Guwahati. First Salesian Priest to work in Guwahati – Fr. Gill (from Spain).
- 1925 – First Rector of Don Bosco School, Guwahati – Fr. Piasescki (Poland).
- 1926 – Opening of our Lady's Orphanage by Fr. Piasescki (Rector) and Msgr. Mathias (Provincial).
- 1928 – Don Bosco Technical School opened in Guwahati.
- 1947 – Don Bosco College Hostel started by Fr. Uget, Provincial and Fr. Colussi, Rector.
- 1948 – Opening of Don Bosco School, Guwahati.
- 1952 – First Batch of students to write matric examinations under Guwahati University.
- 1953 – First issue of school magazine "The Bosconian" was out.

1954–1987

- 1954 – Introduction of house system.
- 1964 – First batch of students to write HSLC exams under SEBA.
- 1968 – Don Bosco Technical School shifted to Don Bosco Maligaon.
- 1978 – Interact Club takes initiatives to bring Mother Teresa to Guwahati and established the first concert.
- 1980 – Opening of Pre-primary and Primary Classes.
- 1987 – Introduction of computers in the School.

1988–2002

- 1988 – The Celebration of Don Bosco's Birth Centenary by the Salesian family under the leadership of Don Bosco Guwahati. All India Don Bosco Table Tennis Championship and Centenary of Don Bosco organised.
- 1989 – First issue of school newsletter "Bosconews" published.
- 1990 – The Blessing of the newly constructed St. Joseph's Church.
- 1993 – Inauguration of the new Don Bosco Auditorium cum Sports Complex.
- 1995 – The diocese of Guwahati became an Archdiocese.
- 2002 – Construction of the covered gallery and the Bro. Ignatius Pavilion.
- 2002 – Girl students admitted into the Evening school. Adult literacy and Skills training centre opened, for women.
- 2002 – Inauguration of the Office of the DB Past Pupils, Guwahati Unit.

2003–2005

- 2004 – Renovation and air-conditioning of Don Bosco library.
- 2004 – Inauguration of Don Bosco Annex.
- 2004 – Commencement of "Live-in Exposure Camps" for Primary and middle school classes.
- 2004 – Inauguration of Vechi and Vigano computer labs.
- 2004 – Abolishing of examination and tests for primary classes and the introduction of continuous evaluation for the primary school.
- 2005 – Introduction of Digital classroom and multi-media teaching aids.

2006

- 2006 – Construction of the Art Gallery.
- 2006 – Don Bosco Rongali Bihu Utsav organised for the first time.
- 2006 – Affiliation of the school to Central Board of Secondary Education (CBSE).
- 2006 – Foundation Laying ceremony for the Centenary Block.

2008

- 2008 – Blessing of the Academic Wing of the Centenary Block.
- 2008 – Abolishing of textbooks for classes I-III.
- 2008 – Last batch for HSLC examinations under Secondary Education Board of Assam (SEBA).
- 2008 – Inauguration of Jeevan Sarathi Counselling services.
- 2008 – Inauguration of Diamond Jubilee Park and monument of Gandhiji.
- 2008 – Installation of wall murals of the four patrons of the house system.
- 2008 – Foundation laying ceremony of the Diamond Jubilee Wing for disaster management.

2009–present

- 2009 – First batch for Board exams under Central Board of Secondary Education (CBSE).
- 2009 – Don Bosco upgraded to Senior Secondary.
- 2009 – Admission of girl students to class XI.
- 2010 – Admission of girl students to Kindergarten and Class I.
- 2020 - First batch of girl students for Class X Board exams.

=== Rectors ===
- Fr. Attilio Colussi [1948 – 1949]
- Fr. Arneodo [1949 – 1953]
- Fr. E. Zanon [1953 – 1957]
- Fr. Del Col [1957 – 1960]
- Fr. Melino [1960 – 1967]
- Fr. Patrick Burns [1967 – 1973]
- Fr. T.T. Thomas [1973 – 1979]
- Fr. P.J. Thomas [1979 – 1985]
- Fr. V.M. Thomas [1985 – 1989]
- Fr. C.T. Lukose [1989 – 1992]
- Fr. K.O. Augustine [1992 – 1995]
- Fr. C. Kuriala [1995 – 2001]
- Fr. J.M. Thelekkatt [2001—2012]
- Fr. Antony Thekkel [2012–2015]
- Fr. Sebastian Mathew [2015–present]

=== Headmasters ===
- Mr. Harmohan Das 1948–1953
- Fr. Patrick Burns 1953–1968
- Fr. Thomas Vattoth 1968–1971
- Fr. K.S.Paul 1971–1973
- Fr. T.T.Thomas 1973–1979
- Fr. J.Thelekkatt 1979–1980
- Fr. V.J.Sebastian 1980–1982
- Fr. V.M.Thomas 1982–1990
- Fr. M.C.George 1990–1993
- Fr. Mathew Vellankal 1993–1995
- Fr. C.Kuriala 1995–2001

=== Principals ===
- Fr. J. M. Thelekkatt 2001–2012
- Fr. Antony Thekkel 2012–2015
- Fr. Sebastian Mathew 2015-2024
- Fr. Alex Mathew 2024–present

== House System ==
=== Bezbarua House ===
Patron: Lakshminath Bezbarua
Colour: Yellow
Motto: No Pain, No Gain

=== Bordoloi House ===
Patron: Nabin Chandra Bordoloi
Colour: Green
Motto: Character Is True Wealth

=== Lachit House ===
Patron: Lachit Borphukan
Colour: Red
Motto: Service To Humanity

=== Phukan House ===
Patron: Tarun Ram Phukan
Colour: Blue
Motto: Nobility Of Character

=== Notable alumni ===
Ujjal Bhuyan, Judge, Supreme Court of India
