= High Court of Karnataka (Gulbarga Bench) =

Bench of the High Court in Karnataka, India

High Court of Karnataka, Kalaburagi Bench
- ಕರ್ನಾಟಕ ಹೈಕೋರ್ಟ್, ಕಲಬುರಗಿ ಪೀಠ
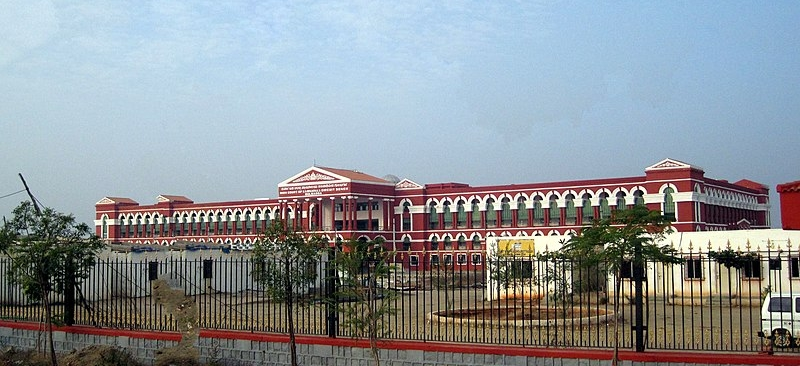
- High Court of Karnataka building, Gulbarga
- Interactive map of High Court of Karnataka, Kalaburagi Bench
- 17°18′50″N 76°47′51″E
- Established: 31 August 2013; 12 years ago
- Location: Kalaburagi, Karnataka, India
- Coordinates: 17°18′50″N 76°47′51″E
- Composition method: Permanent bench; Presidential appointment on advice of the Chief Justice of India and the Governor of Karnataka
- Authorised by: Constitution of India
- Appeals to: Supreme Court of India
- Judge term length: Mandatory retirement at age 62
- Number of positions: 5 (sanctioned); 3 (current)
- Language: Kannada, English
- Website: karnatakajudiciary.kar.nic.in

The High Court of Karnataka, Kalaburagi Bench (Hindi: ಕರ್ನಾಟಕ ಹೈಕೋರ್ಟ್, ಕಲಬುರಗಿ ಪೀಠ)is a permanent bench of the Karnataka High Court established in 2013 to serve northern Karnataka, India.

== History ==
The Kalaburagi Bench was approved as a permanent bench by the Government of India on August 30, 2013, following recommendations from the Chief Justice of India and consultations with the state government. The bench was inaugurated on August 31, 2013 by Chief Justice P. Sathasivam and Karnataka Chief Minister Siddaramaiah.

The bench initially functioned from temporary facilities at the District Court complex, and faced several challenges including:

- Jurisdictional questions raised through a 2011 PIL
- Infrastructure deficits reported in 2016
- A 17-day lawyers' boycott in 2015

== Jurisdiction ==
The bench serves all six districts of northern Karnataka, including Bellary, Bidar, Kalaburagi, Koppal, Raichur and Yadgir.

== Operations ==
The judicial strength of the court is summarised as:

Year	Sanctioned	Actual	Notes
2013	4	4	
2017	4	2-3	
2023	5	3	

Since 2018, the bench has maintained special arrangements during court vacations with rotating judges from the principal bench.

A 2023 assessment noted that the court has dealt with 93,784 cases in the first decade of its operations, delivered a reduction of forty percent of case backlog for the northern districts, and improved access for women and marginalized communities.

== See also ==
- Dharwad Bench of the High Court
- Judiciary of India
