= L. Narayana Swamy =

Former Chief Justice of Himachal Pradesh High Court

Hon'ble Chief Justice (Retd.) L. Narayana Swamy

Member of Lokpal of India
- Incumbent
- Assumed office 12 March 2024
- Appointed by: Droupadi Murmu
- Chairperson: Ajay Manikrao Khanwilkar

Chaiperson of Karnataka State Human Rights Commission
- In office 25 November 2023 – 11 March 2024
- Appointed by: Thawar Chand Gehlot
- Preceded by: Dhirendra Hiralal Waghela
- Succeeded by: Dr. T. Sham Bhatt (acting)

25th Chief Justice of Himachal Pradesh High Court
- In office 6 October 2019 – 30 June 2021
- Nominated by: Ranjan Gogoi
- Appointed by: Ram Nath Kovind
- Preceded by: V. Ramasubramanian
- Succeeded by: Mohammad Rafiq

Judge of Karnataka High Court
- In office 4 July 2007 – 5 October 2019; Acting CJ : 18 January 2019 - 9 May 2019
- Nominated by: K. G. Balakrishnan
- Appointed by: A. P. J. Abdul Kalam

Personal details
- Born: 1 July 1959 (age 66) Bhadravathi, Karnataka

Lingappa Narayana Swamy (born 1 July 1959) is a retired Indian judge who is currently serving as Judicial member of Lokpal of India. He also served as the former Chief Justice of Himachal Pradesh High Court. He is former Judge of Karnataka High Court. He served as the Acting Chief Justice of Karnataka High Court from 18 January 2019 to 9 May 2019, after the elevation of Justice Dinesh Maheshwari to Supreme Court of India.

== Career ==
Swamy is B.A., LL.M. He was enrolled as an Advocate on 15 October 1987. He practised before the High Court of Karnataka, Karnataka Administrative Tribunal & Central Administrative Tribunal. He was appointed an Additional Judge of the Karnataka High Court on 4 July 2007 and Permanent Judge on 17 April 2009. He was appointed Acting Chief Justice of Karnataka High Court on 18 January 2019. He was appointed Chief justice of Himachal Pradesh High Court on 6 October 2019. He retired on 30 June 2021. In, February 2024 he was appointed as Judicial member of Lokpal where he served till 30 June 2029.
