= Huluvadi G. Ramesh =

Honourable Mr. Justice Huluvadi G. Ramesh

Judge, Madras High Court
- Incumbent
- Assumed office 11 April 2016
- Appointed by: Pranab Mukherjee

Judge of the High Court of Judicature at Allahabad
- In office 16 February 2015 – 10 April 2016
- Appointed by: Pranab Mukherjee

Judge, High Court of Karnataka
- In office 8 September 2003 – 15 February 2015
- Appointed by: A. P. J. Abdul Kalam

Personal details
- Born: 20 May 1957 (age 69)

Justice Huluvadi G. Ramesh (born 20 May 1957) is the second seniormost judge at the Madras High Court in India since April 2016. He briefly officiated as the Acting Chief Justice of the court from February 2017 till the appointment of Indira Banerjee as Chief Justice in April 2017. He was transferred to the Madhya Pradesh High Court principal seat at Jabalpur and assumed charge on 15.11.2018.

== Career ==
Ramesh started off as an advocate in March 1981. Initially, he used to practise in the courts at Mysore and Bangalore districts. He became a District Judge in Karnataka in February 1993 and was named as an additional judge at the Karnataka High Court in September 2004. Ramesh was transferred to Allahabad High Court in February 2015. He alleged a conspiracy behind the same during his farewell address. In 2016, he was brought to Mardas High Court at Chennai.

== Notable judgements ==
- As a judge at the Karnataka High Court in July 2008, Ramesh determined that the Bangalore Development Authority cannot acquire privately owned lands for industrial purposes. He termed such an action to be illegal, unconstitutional and "nothing but an exercise of power by the State." This was in response to more than 220 petitions by residents of 12 villages from Begur, Sarjapura, Varthur, Konappana Agrahara etc.
- In January 2015, a single judge Karnataka HC bench headed by Ramesh expressed displeasure at the Government of Karnataka's amendment to the Motor Vehicles Rules which sought to levy a lifetime tax on owners of automobiles registered outside Karnataka if they remain in the state for more than 30 days. The state was deemed to have not followed the necessary procedure, curtailing the freedom of movement guaranteed by the Constitution and contrary to the parent Motor Vehicles Act, 1988. In an interim order, the judge noted,"The [transport] department does nothing to keep the roads in good condition but is interested in collecting tax." The stay order came as a relief to thousands of people whose cars were being seized and after the transport department had collected more than ₹25 crores as part of their tax collection drive.
- A Division Bench of the Madras High Court made up of Justices Ramesh and M. V. Muralidaran held in October 2016 that Annamalai University is not a state university and as such, its Syndicate is empowered to decide the fee structure for the university.
- In March 2017, the First Bench of Madras HC consisting of Ramesh and R. M. T. Teekaa Raman JJ. ruled that the appointment of law officers of the government is a prerogative of the State as long as they are done as per the Supreme Court of India's guidelines.
