= Humchadakatte G. Ramesh =

Indian jurist (born 1957)

Honourable Justice H. G. Ramesh

Judge of Karnataka High Court
- In office 12 May 2003 – 15 January 2019
- Appointed by: Ram Nath Kovind
- Preceded by: Subhro Kamal Mukherjee
- Succeeded by: Dinesh Maheshwari

Acting Chief Justice of Karnataka High Court
- In office 10 October 2017 – 12 February 2018
- Appointed by: A. P. J. Abdul Kalam

Personal details
- Born: 16 January 1957 (age 69)

Justice Humchadakatte Gopalaiah Ramesh (born 16 January 1957) is an Indian jurist. He served as the acting Chief Justice at the High Court of Karnataka between 10 October 2017 and 12 February 2018.

== Career ==
Justice Ramesh enrolled as an advocate in 1982 and began his practice at Karnataka High Court. He was appointed an additional judge of the Court in May 2003 and confirmed as a permanent judge in September 2004. In February 2017, he turned down the Supreme Court collegium's offer to be made the Chief Justice of Madras High Court.

== Notable judgements ==
- A single-judge bench consisting of Justice Ramesh ordered the Kempegowda Institute of Medical Sciences to pay ₹1 crore as compensation to each of the three students who had to be denied the last remaining seat at the college. The judge also noted his reservations about the functioning of the educational institution and asked the Medical Council of India to take corrective action.

== Controversy ==
The Economic Times reported in March 2017 that Justice Ramesh was upset over being denied a promotion to the Supreme Court of India in favour of Justice S. Abdul Nazeer. In protest, he wrote to the then Chief Justice of India Jagdish Singh Khehar, stating that "My supersession on ground of giving representation to a minority in the Supreme Court by recommending the name of a judge, who is junior to me, is certainly not correct." Justice Ramesh also said, "I request lordships to deny me the honour of becoming the chief justice of Madras High Court." Justice Indira Banerjee of the High Court of Delhi was subsequently appointed in his place.
