= Vibhu Bakhru =

35th Chief Justice of Karnataka High Court

Hon'ble Chief Justice Vibhu Bakhru
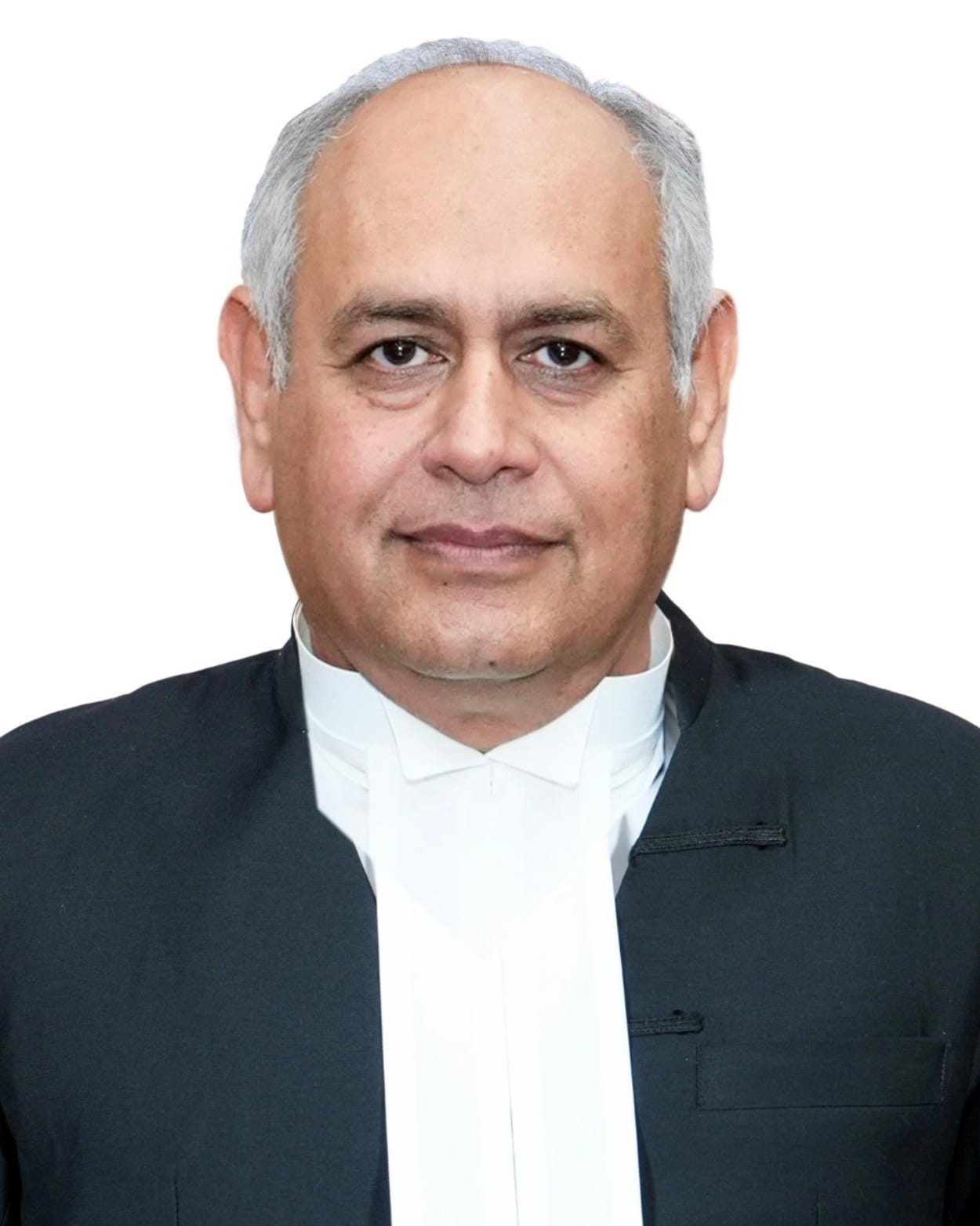

35th Chief Justice of Karnataka High Court
- Incumbent
- Assumed office 19 July 2025
- Nominated by: B. R. Gavai
- Appointed by: Droupadi Murmu
- Preceded by: N. V. Anjaria; V. Kameswar Rao (acting)

Judge of Delhi High Court
- In office 17 April 2013 – 18 July 2025; Acting CJ : 5 December 2024 – 20 January 2025
- Nominated by: Altamas Kabir
- Appointed by: Pranab Mukherjee

Personal details
- Born: 2 November 1966 (age 59) Nagpur
- Education: B.Com. C.A.
- Alma mater: Delhi University, Institute of Chartered Accountants of India

Vibhu Bakhru (born 2 November 1966) is an Indian jurist, currently serving as the Chief Justice of the Karnataka High Court. Previously, he has also served as a judge of the Delhi High Court. He had also served as Acting Chief Justice of the Delhi High Court. On 26 May 2025 the Supreme Court collegium recommended his appointment as chief justice of the Karnataka High Court.
