= P. S. Dinesh Kumar =

Former Chief Justice of Karnataka High Court

Hon'ble Chief Justice (Retd.) Pratinidhi Srinivasacharya Dinesh Kumar

Chief Justice of Karnataka High Court
- In office 3 February 2024 – 24 February 2024
- Nominated by: Dhananjaya Y. Chandrachud
- Appointed by: Droupadi Murmu

Acting Chief Justice of Karnataka High Court
- In office 25 January 2024 – 2 February 2024
- Appointed by: Droupadi Murmu

Judge of Karnataka High Court
- In office 2 January 2015 – 24 January 2024
- Nominated by: H. L. Dattu
- Appointed by: Pranab Mukherjee

Personal details
- Born: 25 February 1962 (age 64)

Pratinidhi Srinivasacharya Dinesh Kumar (born 25 February 1962) is an Indian judge and a former Chief Justice of Karnataka High Court.

== Early life ==
Kumar did his schooling at National High School in Bengaluru where he got a National Merit Scholar Certificate. Later, he attended National College and BMS College for his graduation.

== Career ==
Kumar became Additional Judge of Karnataka High Court on 2 January 2015 and was made a permanent judge on 30 December 2016. In 1990, he started his legal practice in the High Court of Karnataka. In 1998, he became an Additional Central Government Standing Counsel and in 2003, he was elevated as Senior Standing Counsel. He was the senior panel counsel for CBI and senior standing counsel for several other organisations like BSNL, UPSC, UGC, AICTE and NCTE. He was appointed as the Acting Chief Justice of Karnataka High Court on 25 January 2024 and was appointed as the Chief Justice of Karnataka High Court on 3 February 2024. He was retired on 24 February 2024. He was later appointed as the Presiding Officer of Securities Appellate Tribunal (SAT) for a period of 4 years.
