= R. V. Raveendran =

Indian judge (born 1946)

Raju Varadarajulu Raveendran

Judge of the Supreme Court of India
- In office 9 September 2005 – 15 October 2011

18th Chief Justice of the Madhya Pradesh High Court
- In office 8 July 2004 – 8 September 2005

Judge of the Karnataka High Court
- In office 22 February 1993 – 7 July 2004

Personal details
- Born: 15 October 1946 (age 79) India

Raju Varadarajulu Raveendran also known as R. V. Raveendran (born 15 October 1946) is a former judge of the Supreme Court of India. On 13 October 2011, a Supreme Court bench headed by Raveendran, inexplicably, nearly halved the sum of compensation awarded to victims and families of the deceased in the Uphaar Cinema fire by the [Delhi High Court], and slashed punitive damages to be paid by cinema owners, the Ansal brothers, from ₹2.5 crore (equivalent to ₹4.4 crore or US$550,000 in 2020) to ₹25 lakh (equivalent to ₹44 lakh or US$55,000 in 2020). Raveendran retired the next day, 14 October 2011, upon reaching superannuation. On 27 October 2021, the Supreme Court of India appointed Raveendran to supervise a three-member committee that will examine the allegations of unauthorised surveillance using Israeli spyware Pegasus.

== Career ==
Raveendran holds a bachelor's degree in Science and Law. He became an advocate in 1968. He was elevated to the Karnataka High Court in 1993. He became the Chief Justice of the Madhya Pradesh High Court in 2004, and was elevated to the Supreme Court of India in October 2005.

He has seen several high-profile cases like the OBC reservation, 1993 Bombay bombings and the Krishna Godavari basin dispute. He recused himself from the Krishna Godavari basin dispute case citing conflict of interest.
