= Subhro Kamal Mukherjee =

Indian judge (born 1955)

Vice-Chancellor of the Rabindra Bharati University
- Acting
- In office 7 July 2023 – 1 August 2025
- Appointed by: Governor of West Bengal
- Preceded by: Nirmalya Narayan Chakraborty
- Succeeded by: Sonali Chakravarti Banerjee

Vice-Chancellor of the Presidency University
- Acting
- In office 4 September 2023 – 4 June 2024
- Appointed by: Governor of West Bengal
- Preceded by: Anuradha Lohia
- Succeeded by: Nirmalya Narayan Chakraborty

28th Chief Justice of the Karnataka High Court
- In office 23 February 2016 – 9 October 2017
- Appointed by: Pranab Mukherjee, President of India
- Preceded by: Dhirendra Hiralal Waghela
- Succeeded by: H. G. Ramesh (acting)

Judge of the Karnataka High Court
- In office 15 April 2015 – 22 February 2016
- Appointed by: Pranab Mukherjee, President of India

Judge of the Calcutta High Court
- In office 15 September 2000 – 14 April 2015
- Appointed by: K. R. Narayanan, President of India

Personal details
- Born: 10 October 1955 (age 70) Bhagalpur, Bihar
- Spouse: Krishna Mukherjee (m. 1981)
- Children: 2
- Education: University of Calcutta

Subhro Kamal Mukherjee (born 10 October 1955) is a retired Indian judge and a former chief justice of the High Court of Karnataka. He was appointed as the interim Vice-Chancellor of Presidency University, Kolkata in September 2023. In July 2023, the Governor of West Bengal appointed him as the interim Vice-Chancellor of Rabindra Bharati University.

== Background ==
Mukherjee comes from a family of lawyers and is a sixth-generation lawyer. He completed his Master of Arts in history and LLB from Calcutta University. He joined the Calcutta High Court as an advocate in 1982 practising mainly in civil and writ matters.

== Judicial career ==
Mukherjee was appointed a permanent judge of the Calcutta High Court on 15 September 2000. He was transferred to Karnataka High Court on 15 April 2015. Upon transfer of the then chief justice, Dhirendra Hiralal Waghela, to Odisha High Court, he was appointed the acting chief justice of Karnataka High Court on 1 June 2015. He took the oath as the chief justice on 23 February 2016. His oath was administered by the governor of Karnataka, Vajubhai Vala.

== Controversies ==
In 2017, the Bar Council of Karnataka sought action against Mukherjee after he commented that Tipu Sultan was not a freedom fighter, but a monarch who fought to safeguard his interests. On his retirement as chief justice, he was not accorded the customary farewell following a resolution passed by the Karnataka State Bar Council.

Mukherjee's appointment by Governor C. V. Ananda Bose as the acting Vice-Chancellor of both Rabindra Bharati University and Presidency University took place amidst centre-state tensions between the governor and the Government of West Bengal. The West Bengal education minister, Bratya Basu, said, "The Governor's recent action is aimed at bankrupting the higher education system. He is destroying the statutes of respective state universities. Such appointments have been made without consulting anybody. He is acting in a dictatorial manner."

In August 2023, Mukherjee stopped going to his office in Rabindra Bharati University "out of fear" after a section of staff members accused him of consuming alcohol inside his office. Mukherjee denied the allegation and claimed that it was he who was abused by the staff members of the university.

In September 2023, the student organisations Independents' Consolidation and Students' Federation of India expressed scepticism over Mukherjee's appointment as acting VC of Presidency University. The student bodies alleged interference by the union government in university appointments and raised questions over Mukherjee's lack of academic qualifications to head a university.
