= N. Venkatachala =

Indian judge (1930–2019)

- Born: 3 July 1930; Mittur village, Mulabagal taluk, Kolar, Kingdom of Mysore
- Died: 30 October 2019 (aged 89); Bangalore, Karnataka, India
- Education: Bachelor of Law from Mysore university
- Occupations: Former Justice of the Supreme Court India and former Lokayukta of Karnataka
- Title: LokAyukta

Nanje Gowda Venkatachala (3 July 1930 – 30 October 2019) was a judge of the Supreme Court of India and Lokayukta of state of Karnataka. He was known for his approach of taking action in each and every case he caught, many times red-handed by personally leading the raid while he was serving as Lokayukta. He became the first of the four Lokayuktas to take the oath of office and secrecy in Kannada language with the governor also administering the oath in Kannada. He is survived by his wife Anasuya Chala and children M.V. Seshachala, M.V. Vedachala, Aruna Ramesh and Arjuna Chala.

== Early life ==
N. Venkatachala was born in Mittur village of Mulabagal taluk in Kolar district in a respectable agriculturist's family. After completing his schooling from Mulbagal and Kolar he moved to Bengaluru to pursue his college education. He obtained Bachelor of Science and Bachelor of Law degrees from Mysore University. He was married to Anasuya.

== Career ==
Venkatachala enrolled as an advocate in the then High Court of Mysore on 16 November 1955. He served as a part-time reader in Mercantile Law from 1958 to 1970 and a legal adviser to the University of Agricultural Sciences, Hebbal from 1963 to 1973 and Bangalore University from 1970 to 1973. He was elected as high Court government pleader in 1968 and continued in that position till 1973 and when he was promoted to high court government advocate which he served till 1977. He was appointed additional judge for Karnataka High Court on 28 November 1977 and a permanent judge on 8 September 1978. He functioned as a tribunal for prevention of unlawful activities under the unlawful activities prevention act during the year 1990. He was appointed the acting chief justice for Karnataka High Court in May, 1992. On 1 July 1992 he was sworn in as judge of the Supreme Court of India which he remained until 22 July 1995.

== Lokayukta ==
Venkatachala was best known for rejuvenating the department of Karnataka LokAyukta, the anti corruption agency. The then CM, S M Krishna, chose him as the Lokayukta on 2 July 2001. Sri Venkatachala revamped the working of Lokayukta. In spite of not having suo-moto powers to investigate, Sri Venkatachala used the appeals coming to Lokayukta, to initiate probe and raid. Due to his pro-active approach, number of complaints the office of Lokayukta was receiving dramatically increased from 20–25 per day to 200–250 per day while Venkatachala was in tenure. He personally led hundreds of raids often lashing out at corruption in political life. In his four and a half years in office, he had looked into more than 50,000 cases of misconduct and complaints from members of the public. While purists questioned his model of raiding government officials without notices, he was lauded in equal measure for acting as a deterrent towards corruption. He even drew lot of criticism often from politicians who accused him of tarnishing all politicians with the same brush. He was discontinued as Lokayukta for the second term because of legal hurdles although a huge campaign was done in favor of him. Owing to his popularity he was featured in a Kannada film Lancha Samrajya as an officer fighting the corruption.
