= S. R. Bannurmath =

Indian judge

Justice S. R. Bannurmath

Personal details
- Citizenship: Indian

Justice S. R. Bannurmath (Kannada:ಎಸ್. ಆರ್. ಬನ್ನೂರ್ ಮಠ) (born 23 January 1948 in Dharwad) is a former Chief Justice of Kerala High Court and he was Chairman of Maharashtra State Human Rights Commission from September 2013 to January 2018. Bannurmath was also a judge of Karnataka High Court and served as State Public Prosecutor and Government Advocate of the Government of Karnataka. He is a graduate of Raja Lakhamgouda Law College, Belgaum. He is the first chief justice in India to declare his assets in 2009 along with all judges.
