= H. L. Dattu =

42nd Chief Justice of India

Hon'ble Chief Justice H. L. Dattu
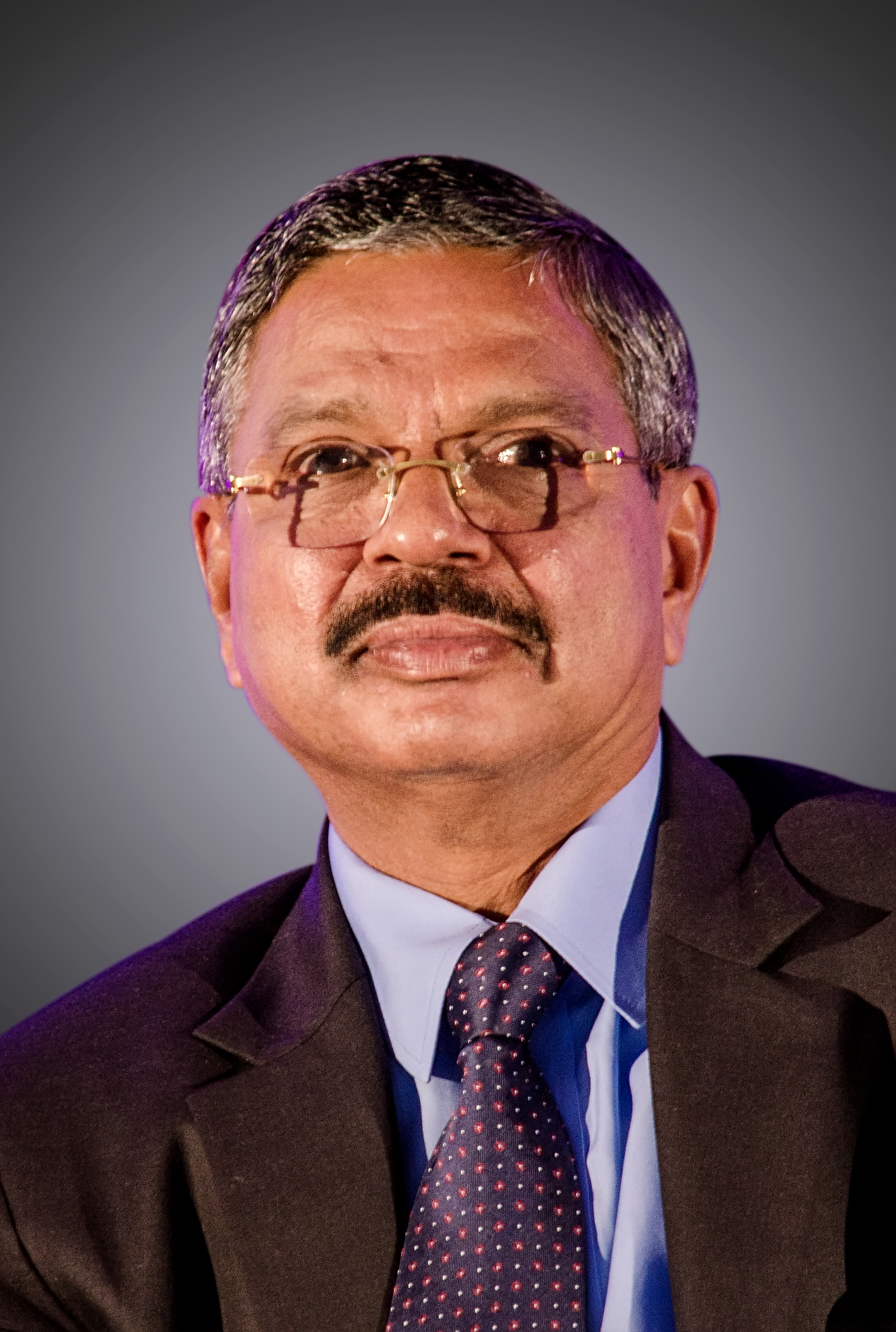

7th Chairperson of National Human Rights Commission of India
- In office 29 February 2016 – 2 December 2020
- Appointed by: Pranab Mukherjee
- Preceded by: K. G. Balakrishnan
- Succeeded by: Arun Kumar Mishra

42nd Chief Justice of India
- In office 28 September 2014 – 2 December 2015
- Appointed by: Pranab Mukherjee
- Preceded by: Rajendra Mal Lodha
- Succeeded by: T. S. Thakur

Judge of Supreme Court of India
- In office 17 December 2008 – 28 September 2014
- Nominated by: K. G. Balakrishnan
- Appointed by: Pratibha Patil

27th Chief Justice of Kerala High Court
- In office 18 May 2007 – 16 December 2008
- Nominated by: K. G. Balakrishnan
- Appointed by: A. P. J. Abdul Kalam
- Preceded by: V. K. Bali; K. S. Radhakrishnan (acting)
- Succeeded by: S. R. Bannurmath; J. B. Koshy (acting)

6th Chief Justice of Chhattisgarh High Court
- In office 12 February 2007 – 17 May 2007
- Nominated by: Y. K. Sabharwal
- Appointed by: A. P. J. Abdul Kalam
- Preceded by: S. R. Nayak; L. C. Bhadoo (acting)
- Succeeded by: Rajiv Gupta; Jagadish Bhalla (acting)

Judge of Karnataka High Court
- In office 18 December 1995 – 11 February 2007
- Nominated by: A. M. Ahmadi
- Appointed by: Shankar Dayal Sharma

Personal details
- Born: 3 December 1950 (age 75) Chikkapattanagere, Chikmagalur, Mysore State (present-day Karnataka), India

Handyala Lakshminarayanaswamy Dattu (born 3 December 1950) is a former Chief Justice of India, and former chairman of the National Human Rights Commission. As the chief justice, he served for nearly 14 months, from 28 September 2014 to 2 December 2015. Before his elevation as a judge of the Supreme Court of India on 17 December 2008, he had served as the Chief Justice of the Kerala High Court and Chhattisgarh High Court.

== Early life and education ==
Dattu was born in Chikkapattanagere village in Chikmagalur district of Mysore State (present-day Karnataka). His father H L Narayanaswamy was an English teacher. He completed his early education in Kadur, Tarikere, and Birur, before moving to Bengaluru where he completed his Bachelor of Laws.

== Career ==
=== As a lawyer ===
Dattu was enrolled as an advocate at the bar on 23 October 1975. He practised at Bengaluru in civil, criminal, constitutional, and taxation matters. He appeared as government counsel in the Karnataka High court for the sales tax department from 1983 to 1990, government advocate from 1990 to 1993, standing counsel for the income tax department from 1992 to 1993, and a senior standing counsel for the Income Tax department from 1993 to 1995.

=== As a judge ===
Dattu was appointed a judge of the Karnataka High Court on 18 December 1995. Thereafter, on 12 February 2007; he was elevated as Chief Justice of the Chhattisgarh High Court. On 18 May 2007, he was transferred to head the Kerala High Court. On 5 September 2014, the President of India appointed Dattu as the next Chief Justice of India, on the recommendation of CJI Rajendra Mal Lodha. On 28 September 2014, he was sworn in as the 42nd Chief Justice of India. He held the post for a little over a year until his retirement on 2 December 2015, on turning 65 years of age – one of the longer tenures for a CJI in recent years.

Over the course of his tenure on the Supreme Court, Dattu authored 117 judgments.

In February 2014, Dattu was nominated by then CJI P Sathasivam as the CJI's nominee to the five-member panel to appoint the Lokpal. He is a visitor of Hidayatullah National Law University, Raipur.

In February 2016, Dattu began serving as the chairperson of the National Human Rights Commission of India and where he served till 2 December 2020.

== Personal life ==
Dattu is a connoisseur of Carnatic music. He is known for his hard work and, is considered as a disciplinarian.

== Allegations ==
Dattu had corruption charges levelled against him before he became chief justice. Justice Katju has taken up the issue in his blog posts, where he called for Dattu's impeachment on charges of corruption.

Dattu was also involved in controversy after he asked for the names of whistleblowers to be revealed in the 2G spectrum case.

Legal offices
Preceded by Rajendra Mal Lodha	Chief Justice of India; 2014–2015	Succeeded by T. S. Thakur
