= Karnataka High Court =

High Court for Indian state of Karnataka

High Court of Karnataka
- Karnāṭaka Ućća Nyāyālaya
- Logo of Karnataka High Court with the Emblem of Karnataka

- Flag of India
- Interactive map of High Court of Karnataka
- 12.9779°N 77.5926°E
- Established: 1884 (142 years ago)
- Jurisdiction: Karnataka
- Location: Principal bench: Bengaluru; Additional benches: Dharwad; Kalaburagi
- Coordinates: 12.9779°N 77.5926°E
- Composition method: Presidential appointment on advice of the Chief Justice of India and the Governor of Karnataka.
- Authorised by: Constitution of India
- Judge term length: Mandatory retirement at age 62
- Number of positions: 62
- Language: Kannada, English
- Website: https://judiciary.karnataka.gov.in

Chief Justice
- Currently: Vibhu Bakhru
- Since: 19 July 2025

The High Court of Karnataka (IAST: Karnāṭaka Ućća Nyāyālaya, commonly referred to as the Karnataka High Court and formerly known as the Mysore High Court, is the highest judicial authority of the Indian state of Karnataka. The court's principal bench is located in Bengaluru, the capital city of Karnataka, with additional benches in Hubballi-Dharwad and Kalaburagi. In Bengaluru, the High Court operates from a red-painted brick building known as the Attara Kacheri, located opposite the Vidhana Soudha, the seat of the Karnataka Legislature.

== Composition ==
The High Court is composed of the Chief Justice of Karnataka and other judges, who are appointed by the President of India. As of February 2022, there are 45 judges in the High Court, against a sanctioned maximum strength of 62. Valluri Kameswar Rao has been the Acting Chief Justice since 30 May 2025.

== Powers and jurisdiction ==
The High Court is the highest judicial authority within the State of Karnataka. It has superintendence over all courts and tribunals, such as district courts, operating within Karnataka, except those of the armed forces. Appeals against judgments of lower courts, such as district-level civil and sessions courts, are heard in the High Court. Appeals against judgments of the High Court are heard by the Supreme Court of India.

The High Court is a court of record and has the authority to prosecute for contempt of itself.

The Karnataka High Court has permanent benches at Hubballi-Dharwada (operational on 24 August 2013) and Kalaburagi (operational on 31 August 2013). Prior to the establishment of permanent benches, Hubballi-Dharwada and Kalaburagi had circuit benches of Karnataka High Court starting in 2008. The Hubballi-Dharwada bench was inaugurated by then Chief Justice of India K.G. Balakrishnan on 4 July 2008 and became operational on 7 July 2008.

== Premises ==
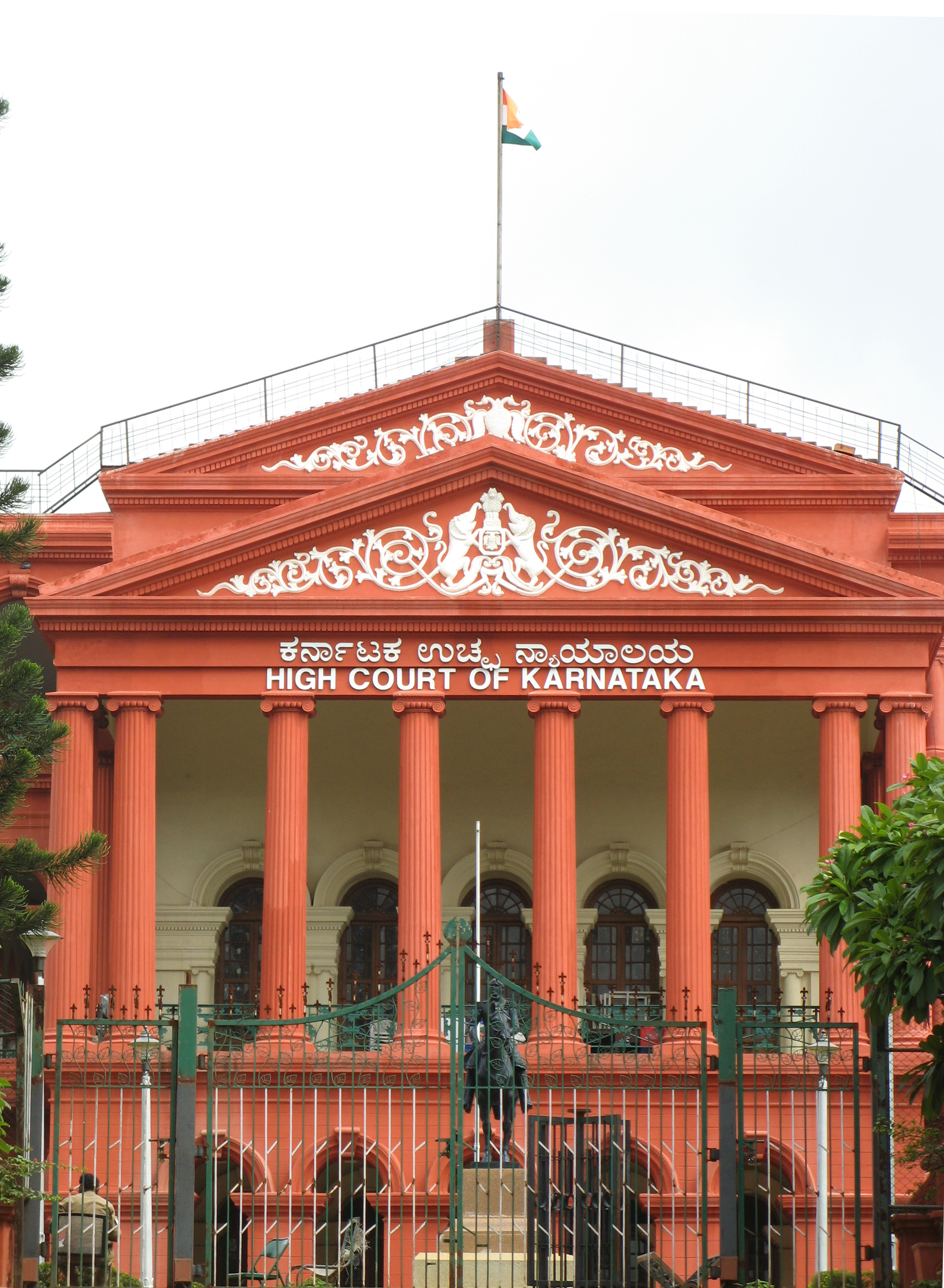
Rear facade of Attara Kacheri, the Bengaluru seat of the Court's principal bench (in Neoclassical architecture style)

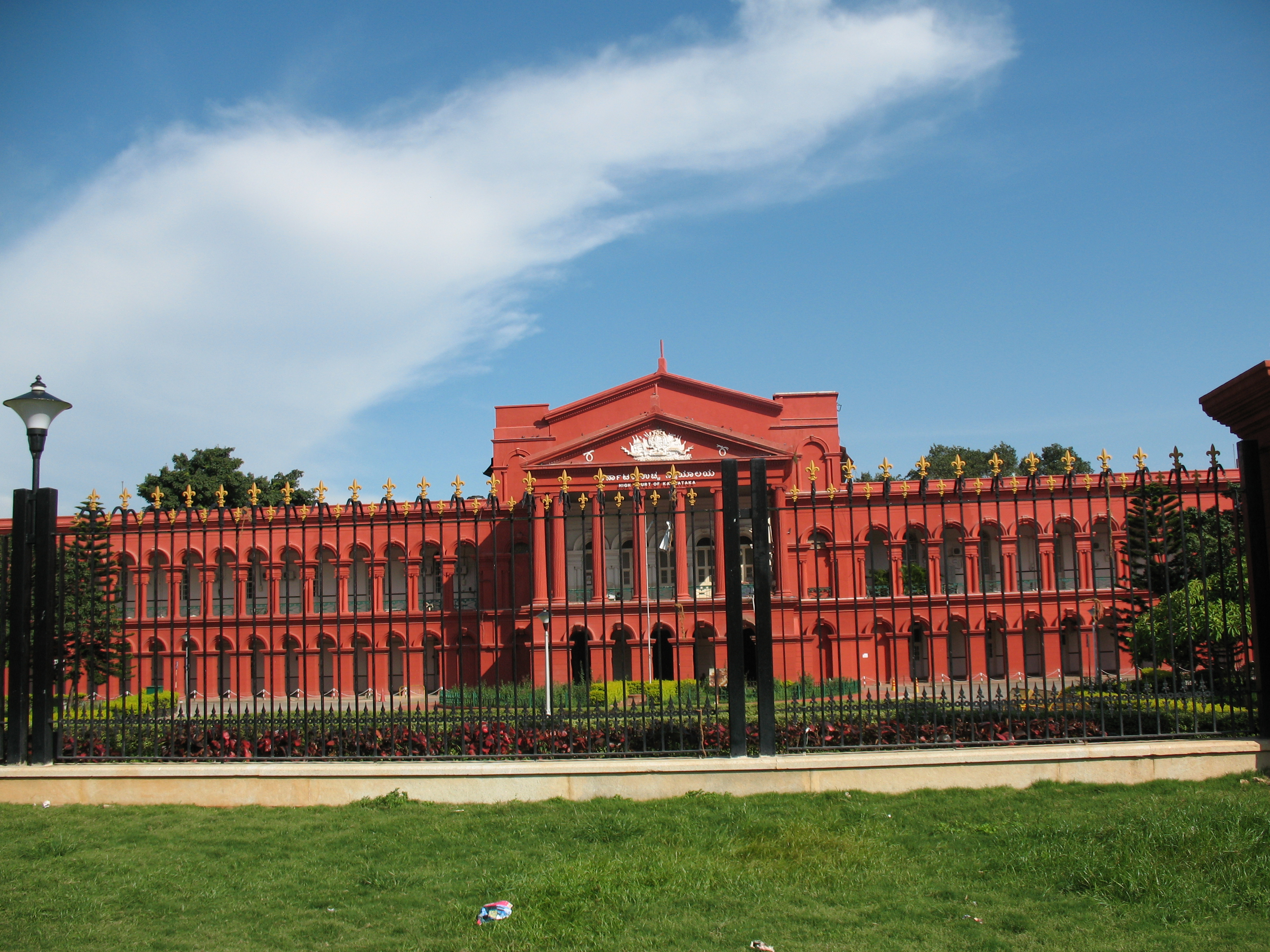
Attara Kacheri, the Bengaluru seat of the Court's principal bench

The High Court's principal bench is located in Bengaluru, in a building called the Attara Kacheri. It is a two-storey building made of stone and brick, painted red, in the neoclassical style. The building was constructed between 1864 and 1868 and is located in Bengaluru's Cubbon Park.

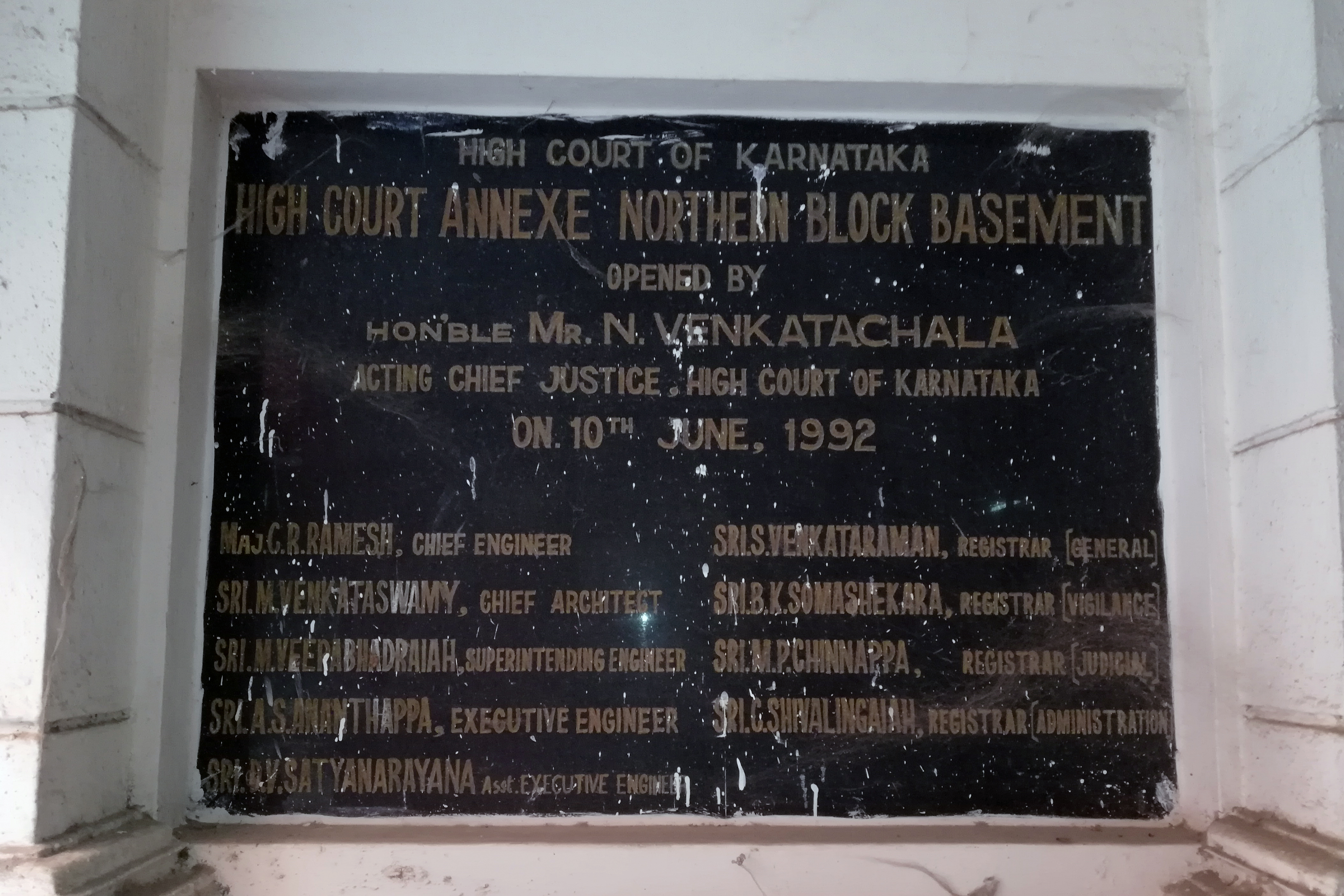
Karnataka High Court Plaque

In 1982, it was proposed to demolish this building. A public interest litigation (PIL) was filed in the High Court to prevent demolition. This was the first PIL ever filed in the court, and the case was heard in the same building that was supposed to be demolished. The petition was dismissed by the High Court, but in 1985 the proposal to demolish the building was dropped after the Supreme Court directed the state government to reconsider demolition.

=== Heritage ===
Lord Cubbon, the then Viceroy of Colonial India was responsible for building Attara Kacheri. The building features Greco-Roman styled architecture with red paint and a sprawling expansive layout, marked by a distinguished central structure. A portion of the High Court building served as Attara Kacheri, during the Mysore Kingdom era, housing various public offices.

The entrance of the Attara Kacheri building now faces the side opposite to the Vidhana Soudha, which was originally the rear side of the former Attara Kacheri. Over a hundred years later, when the building became the High Court, it began to show signs of age and wear. This led to the proposal for its demolition during the tenure of Kengal Hanumanthaiah and again in 1984, when there was a plan to replace it with a new structure. These proposals faced significant protests from citizens who opposed dismantling the colonial-era building.

A Public Interest Litigation (PIL) was filed, but the High Court dismissed the petition. The case was subsequently taken to the Supreme Court. In consideration of the public concerns, the government decided not to demolish the building but instead to renovate and expand it to meet modern needs. The government of Karnataka assigned the task to the engineers of the Public Works Department (PWD). Preparations began in 1986 to renovate the old structure and add a new parallel block, designed in the same style as the original Attara Kacheri.

In 1990s, the Karnataka Government successfully rejuvenated the Attara Kacheri building, adding new blocks alongside the existing structure. The old building was reinforced to accommodate the updated requirements. The Northern Block was formally Inaugurated by Lokayuktha Venkatachala, with a plaque installed during the event.

== Chief Justice and Judges ==
The current sitting judges of the court are as follows:

== List of Chief Justices ==
P. Mahadevayya, M. Sadasivayya, Nittoor Srinivasa Rau, Sam Piroj Bharucha and G. T. Nanavati were among the notable Chief Justices who presided over this court.

=== List of former Chief Justices ===
High Court of Mysore

N	Chief Justice	Term
1	Charles George Plumer	1884 – July 1890
2	Sir T. R. A. Thumboo Chetty	July 1890 – 4 November 1895
3	James William Best	4 November 1895 – 1907
4	Stanley Ismay	1908–1912
5	P. Mahadevayya	1931–1934
6	Palecanda Belliappa Medapa	1948 - 10 April 1955

High Court of Karnataka

#	Portrait	Chief Justice	Term
1		Rudrapatna Venkataramaiah	1 November 1956 – 16 July 1957
2		Subodh Ranjan Das Gupta	25 July 1957 – 13 August 1961
3		Nittoor Srinivasa Rau	29 March 1962 – 7 August 1963
4		Arni Ramasvami Somanath Iyer	23 November 1969 – 29 December 1969
5		Mahadevayya Sadasivayya	30 December 1969 – 16 September 1970
6		Ammembal Narayana Pai	17 September 1970 – 6 June 1973
7		Guthu Konethota Govinda Bhat	7 June 1973 – 14 December 1977
8		Deshmudre Mallappa Chandrashekhar	22 March 1978 – 25 September 1982
9		Koratagere Bhimaiah	28 October 1982 – 10 April 1983
10		Vijaykumar Siddheshwaraswami Malimath	6 February 1984 – 24 October 1985
11		Prem Chand Jain	28 August 1986 – 16 September 1989
12		Shanmughasundaram Mohan	26 October 1989 – 7 October 1991
13	S. P. Bharucha	Sam Piroj Bharucha	1 January 1991 – 30 June 1992
14		Shailesh Bhadrayulal Majumdar	2 July 1993 – 13 September 1994
15		Girish Thakorlal Nanavati	28 September 1994 – 4 March 1995
16		Madhav Laxman Pendse	28 July 1995 – 25 March 1996
17		Syed Abdul Hakeem	3 May 1996 – 9 May 1996
18		Ram Prakash Sethi	29 June 1996 – 6 January 1999
19		Yarabati Bhaskar Rao	9 March 1999 – 26 June 2000
20		Ponaka Venkatarama Reddi	21 October 2000 – 16 August 2001
21		Nagendra Kumar Jain	31 August 2001 – 20 October 2004
22		Nauvdip Kumar Sodhi	19 November 2004 – 29 November 2005
23		Cyriac Joseph	7 January 2006 – 6 July 2008
24		Paul Daniel Dinakaran Premkumar	8 August 2008 – 7 August 2010
25	J. S. Khehar	Jagdish Singh Khehar	8 August 2010 – 12 September 2011
26		Vikramajit Sen	24 December 2011 – 24 December 2012
27		Dhirendra Hiralal Waghela	7 March 2013 – 1 June 2015
28		Subhro Kamal Mukherjee	23 February 2016– 9 October 2017
29		Dinesh Maheshwari	12 February 2018 – 17 January 2019
30		Abhay Shreeniwas Oka	10 May 2019 – 30 August 2021
31		Ritu Raj Awasthi	11 October 2021 – 2 July 2022
32		Prasanna Bhalachandra Varale	15 October 2022 – 24 January 2024
33		Pratinidhi Srinivasacharya Dinesh Kumar	3 February 2024 – 24 February 2024
34		Nilay Vipinchandra Anjaria	25 February 2024 – 29 May 2025
35		Vibhu Bakhru	19 July 2025 – Incumbent

== Judges elevated as Chief Justices ==
This sections contains list of only those judges elevated as chief justices whose parent high court is Karnataka. This includes those judges who, at the time of appointment as chief justice, may not be serving in Karnataka High Court but this list does not include judges who at the time of appointment as chief justice were serving in Karnataka High Court but does not have Karnataka as their Parent High Court.

Colour Key

- Female Chief Justice
- Served as Chief Justice of India

Symbol Key

- ^{‡} Elevated to Supreme Court of India
- ^{RES} Resigned
- ^{†} Died in office

Name	Image	Appointed as CJ in HC of	Date of appointment		Date of retirement (Note: this includes date of resignation, death and elevation to supreme court)	Tenure		Ref..
Name	Image	Appointed as CJ in HC of	As Judge	As Chief Justice	Date of retirement	As Chief Justice	As Judge (Note: also includes tenure as Chief Justice)	Ref..
Rudrapatna Venkataramaiah		Karnataka	25 February 1946	10 April 1955	16 July 1957	2 years, 98 days	11 years, 142 days	
Nittoor Srinivasa Rau		Karnataka	11 June 1955	29 March 1962	7 August 1963	1 year, 132 days	8 years, 58 days	
Arni Ramasvami Somanath Iyer		Karnataka	11 July 1957	23 November 1969	29 December 1969	37 days	12 years, 172 days	
Mahadevayya Sadasivayya		Karnataka	26 August 1957	30 December 1969	16 September 1970	261 days	13 years, 22 days	
Kowdoor Sadananda Hegde		Delhi	26 August 1957	31 October 1966	16 July 1967^{[‡]}	259 days	9 years, 325 days	
Ammembal Narayana Pai		Karnataka	14 March 1958	17 September 1970	6 June 1973	2 years, 263 days	15 years, 85 days	
Guthu Konethota Govinda Bhat		Karnataka	9 April 1962	7 June 1973	14 December 1977	4 years, 191 days	15 years, 250 days	
Deshmudre Mallappa Chandrashekhar		Allahabad, transferred to Karnataka	20 September 1963	10 May 1977	25 September 1982	5 years, 139 days	19 years, 6 days	
Closepet Honniah		Rajasthan	15 March 1965	27 April 1978	22 September 1978	149 days	13 years, 192 days	
Koratagere Bhimaiah		Karnataka	19 July 1965	28 October 1982	10 April 1983	165 days	17 years, 266 days	
Mahadevayya Sadanand Swami		Gauhati	2 June 1967	1 October 1977	5 July 1978	278 days	11 years, 34 days	
Vijaykumar Siddheshwaraswami Malimath		Karnataka, transferred to Kerala	5 March 1970	6 February 1984	10 June 1991	7 years, 125 days	21 years, 98 days	
Kalmanje Jagannatha Shetty		Allahabad	25 June 1970	1 October 1986	30 April 1987^{[‡]}	212 days	16 years, 310 days	
Mandagadde Rama Jois		Punjab & Haryana	28 November 1977	3 May 1992	31 August 1992^{[RES]}	121 days	14 years, 278 days	
Kudarikoti Annadanayya Swamy		Madras	1 January 1979	1 July 1993	19 March 1997	3 years, 262 days	18 years, 78 days	
Muniyallapa Ramakrishna		Jammu & Kashmir, transferred to Gauhati	10 January 1983	10 October 1994	12 April 1998	3 years, 185 days	15 years, 93 days	
Syed Abdul Hakeem		Karnataka	25 May 1984	3 May 1996	9 May 1996	7 days	11 years, 352 days	
Shivaraj Virupanna Patil		Rajasthan	29 March 1990	22 January 1999	14 March 2000^{[‡]}	1 year, 53 days	9 years, 352 days	
Nyaka Yellapa Hanumanthappa		Orissa	29 March 1990	17 February 2001	24 September 2001	220 days	11 years, 180 days	
Korategere Hanumanthayya Narasimha Kuranga		Chhattisgarh	22 February 1993	6 February 2002	10 May 2004	2 years, 95 days	11 years, 79 days	
Raju Varadarajulu Raveendran		Madhya Pradesh	22 February 1993	8 July 2004	8 September 2005^{[‡]}	1 year, 63 days	12 years, 199 days	
Subray Rama Nayak		Chhattisgarh	25 February 1994	17 November 2005	31 December 2006	1 year, 45 days	12 years, 310 days	
Handyala Lalshminarayanaswamy Dattu	H. L. Dattu	Chhattisgarh, transferred to Kerala	18 December 1995	12 February 2007	15 December 2008^{[‡]}	1 year, 308 days	12 years, 364 days	
Samindar Rudrayya Bannurmath		Kerala	11 June 1997	18 March 2009	22 January 2010	311 days	12 years, 226 days	
Venkate Gopala Gowda		Orissa	11 June 1997	25 March 2010	23 December 2012^{[‡]}	2 years, 274 days	15 years, 196 days	
Manjula Chellur		Kerala, transferred to Calcutta then to Bombay	21 February 2000	26 September 2012	4 December 2017	5 years, 70 days	17 years, 287 days	
Mohan Shantanagoudar		Kerala	12 May 2003	22 September 2016	16 February 2017^{[‡]}	148 days	13 years, 281 days	
Ajjikuttira Somaiah Bopanna		Gauhati	6 January 2006	29 October 2018	23 May 2019^{[‡]}	207 days	13 years, 138 days	
Lingappa Narayana Swamy		Himachal Pradesh	4 July 2007	6 October 2019	30 June 2021	1 year, 268 days	13 years, 362 days	
Ravi Vijayakumar Malimath		Madhya Pradesh	18 February 2008	14 October 2021	24 May 2024	2 years, 224 days	16 years, 97 days	
Aravind Kumar		Gujarat	26 June 2009	13 October 2021	12 February 2023^{[‡]}	1 year, 123 days	13 years, 232 days	
Guhanathan Narendar		Uttarakhand	2 January 2015	26 December 2024	9 January 2026	1 year, 15 days	11 years, 8 days	
Pratinidhi Srinivasacharya Dinesh Kumar		Karnataka	2 January 2015	3 February 2024	24 February 2024	22 days	9 years, 54 days	
Pavankumar Bhimappa Bajanthri		Patna	2 January 2015	21 September 2025	22 October 2025	32 days	10 years, 294 days	
Kempaiah Somashekar		Manipur	14 November 2016	22 May 2025	14 September 2025	116 days	8 years, 305 days	

=== Judges appointed as Acting Chief Justice ===
Name	Appointed as ACJ in HC of	Date of appointment as Judge	Period as Acting Chief Justice	Date of retirement	Tenure as ACJ	Tenure as Judge	Remarks	Ref..
N. Srinivasa Rau	Karnataka	11 June 1955	16 Jul 1957 – 24 Jul 1957	7 August 1963	9 days	8 years, 58 days	--	
N. Srinivasa Rau	Karnataka	11 June 1955	13 Aug 1961 – 28 Mar 1962	7 August 1963	228 days	8 years, 58 days	Became permanent	
Hombe Gowda	Karnataka	11 June 1955	7 Aug 1963 – 1 Aug 1969	1 August 1969^{[†]}	5 years, 360 days	14 years, 52 days	Died in office	
A. R. Somanath Iyer	Karnataka	11 July 1957	1 Aug 1969 – 22 Nov 1969	29 December 1969	114 days	12 years, 172 days	Became permanent	
C. Honniah	Karnataka	15 March 1965	15 Dec 1977 – 21 Mar 1978	22 September 1978	97 days	13 years, 192 days	--	
K. Bhimaiah	Karnataka	19 July 1965	26 Sep 1982 – 27 Oct 1982	10 April 1983	32 days	17 years, 266 days	Became permanent	
M. Sadanand Swami	Gauhati	2 June 1967	1 Jul 1977 – 30 Sep 1977	5 July 1978	92 days	11 years, 34 days	Became permanent	
V. S. Malimath	Karnataka	5 March 1970	11 Apr 1983 – 5 Feb 1984	10 June 1991	301 days	21 years, 98 days	Became permanent	
K. Jagannatha Shetty	Karnataka	25 June 1970	24 Oct 1985 – 27 Aug 1986	30 April 1987^{[‡]}	308 days	16 years, 310 days	--	
M. Rama Jois	Karnataka	28 November 1977	17 Sep 1989 – 25 Oct 1989	31 August 1992^{[RES]}	39 days	14 years, 278 days	--	
M. Rama Jois	Karnataka	28 November 1977	7 Oct 1991 – 31 Oct 1991	31 August 1992^{[RES]}	25 days	14 years, 278 days	--	
K. A. Swamy	Karnataka	1 January 1979	1 Jul 1992 – 1 Jul 1993	19 March 1997	1 year, 1 day	18 years, 78 days	Elevated as CJ of Madras	
M. Ramakrishna	Karnataka	10 January 1983	19 Sep 1994 – 27 Sep 1994	12 April 1998	9 days	15 years, 93 days	--	
S. A. Hakeem	Karnataka	25 May 1984	6 Mar 1995 – 27 Jul 1995	9 May 1996	144 days	11 years, 352 days	--	
S. A. Hakeem	Karnataka	25 May 1984	26 Mar 1996 – 2 May 1996	9 May 1996	38 days	11 years, 352 days	Became permanent	
S. Rajendra Babu	Karnataka	19 February 1988	10 May 1996 – 28 Jun 1996	24 September 1997	50 days	9 years, 218 days	--	
Shivaraj Patil	Madras	29 March 1990	28 Dec 1998 – 19 Jan 1999	14 March 2000^{[‡]}	23 days	9 years, 352 days	Elevated as CJ of Rajasthan	
S. R. Nayak	Karnataka	25 February 1994	20 Oct 2004 – 18 Nov 2004	31 December 2006	30 days	12 years, 310 days	Elevated as CJ of Chhattisgarh	
B. Padmaraj	Karnataka	30 November 1994	29 Nov 2005 – 6 Jan 2006	5 October 2006	39 days	11 years, 310 days	--	
Manjula Chellur	Kerala	21 February 2000	9 Nov 2011 – 25 Sep 2012	4 December 2017	322 days	17 years, 287 days	Became permanent	
Karanam Sreedhar Rao	Karnataka	21 February 2000	25 Dec 2012 – 6 Mar 2013	20 October 2015	72 days	15 years, 242 days	--	
Karanam Sreedhar Rao	Gauhati	21 February 2000	13 Aug 2014 – 20 Oct 2015	20 October 2015	1 year, 69 days	15 years, 242 days	Retired as ACJ	
Humchadakatte G. Ramesh	Karnataka	12 May 2003	10 Oct 2017 – 12 Feb 2018	15 January 2019	126 days	15 years, 249 days	--	
Mohan Shantanagoudar	Kerala	12 May 2003	1 Aug 2016 – 21 Sep 2016	16 February 2017^{[‡]}	52 days	13 years, 281 days	Became permanent	
Huluvadi G. Ramesh	Madras	8 September 2003	16 Feb 2017 – 4 Apr 2017	19 May 2019	48 days	15 years, 254 days	--	
Huluvadi G. Ramesh	Madras	8 September 2003	7 Aug 2018 – 11 Aug 2018	19 May 2019	5 days	15 years, 254 days	--	
L. N. Swamy	Karnataka	4 July 2007	18 Jan 2019 – 9 May 2019	30 June 2021	112 days	13 years, 362 days	--	
Ravi Malimath	Uttarakhand	18 February 2008	28 Jul 2020 – 6 Jan 2021	24 May 2024	132 days	16 years, 97 days	Transferred to Himachal Pradesh	
Ravi Malimath	Himachal Pradesh	18 February 2008	1 Jul 2021 – 13 Oct 2021	24 May 2024	105 days	16 years, 97 days	Elevated as CJ of Madhya Pradesh	
P. S. Dinesh Kumar	Karnataka	2 January 2015	25 Jan 2024 – 2 Feb 2024	24 February 2024	9 days	9 years, 54 days	Became permanent	
P. B. Bajanthri	Patna	2 January 2015	29 Aug 2025 – 20 Sep 2025	22 October 2025	23 days	10 years, 294 days	Became permanent	

== Judges elevated to Supreme Court ==
This section includes the list of only those judges whose parent high court was Karnataka. This includes those judges who, at the time of elevation to Supreme Court of India, may not be serving in Karnataka High Court but this list does not include judges who at the time of elevation were serving in Karnataka High Court but does not have Karnataka as their Parent High Court.

Colour Key

- Female Judge
- Served as Chief Justice of India

Key

- ^{RES} Resigned
- ^{†} Died in office

#	Name of the Judge	Image	Date of Appointment		Date of Retirement	Tenure			Immediately preceding office
#	Name of the Judge	Image	In Parent High Court	In Supreme Court	Date of Retirement	In High Court(s)	In Supreme Court	Total tenure (Note: Includes both tenure as High Court Judge as well as Supreme Court Judge)	Immediately preceding office
1	Kowdoor Sadananda Hegde		26 August 1957	17 July 1967	30 April 1973^{[RES]}	9 years, 325 days	5 years, 288 days	15 years, 248 days	1st CJ of Delhi HC
2	Engalaguppe Seetharamiah Venkataramiah		25 June 1970	8 March 1979	17 December 1989	8 years, 256 days	10 years, 285 days	19 years, 176 days	Judge of Karnataka HC
3	Kalmanje Jagannatha Shetty		25 June 1970	1 May 1987	14 December 1991	16 years, 310 days	4 years, 228 days	21 years, 173 days	27th CJ of Allahabad HC
4	Manepalli Narayanarao Venkatachaliah		6 November 1975	5 October 1987	24 October 1994	11 years, 333 days	7 years, 20 days	18 years, 353 days	Judge of Karnataka HC
5	Nanje Gowda Venkatachala		28 November 1977	1 July 1992	2 July 1995	14 years, 216 days	3 years, 2 days	17 years, 217 days	Judge of Karnataka HC
6	Sanjeevalu Rajendra Babu		19 February 1988	25 September 1997	31 May 2004	9 years, 218 days	6 years, 250 days	16 years, 103 days	Judge of Karnataka HC
7	Shivaraj Virupanna Patil		29 March 1990	15 March 2000	11 January 2005	9 years, 352 days	4 years, 303 days	14 years, 289 days	21st CJ of Rajasthan HC
8	Raju Varadarajulu Raveendran		22 February 1993	9 September 2005	15 October 2011	12 years, 199 days	6 years, 37 days	18 years, 236 days	18th CJ of Madhya Pradesh HC
9	Handyala Lakshminarayanaswamy Dattu		18 December 1995	17 December 2008	2 December 2015	12 years, 365 days	6 years, 351 days	19 years, 350 days	27th CJ of Kerala HC
10	Venkate Gopala Gowda		11 June 1997	24 December 2012	5 October 2016	15 years, 196 days	3 years, 287 days	19 years, 117 days	24th CJ of Orissa HC
11	Mohan Shantanagoudar		12 May 2003	17 February 2017	24 April 2021^{[†]}	13 years, 281 days	4 years, 67 days	17 years, 348 days	32nd CJ of Kerala HC
12	Syed Abdul Nazeer		12 May 2003	17 February 2017	4 January 2023	13 years, 281 days	5 years, 322 days	19 years, 238 days	Judge of Karnataka HC
13	Ajjikuttira Somaiah Bopanna		6 January 2006	24 May 2019	19 May 2024	13 years, 138 days	4 years, 362 days	18 years, 135 days	37th CJ of Gauhati HC
14	Bengaluru Venkataramaiah Nagarathna		18 February 2008	31 August 2021	Incumbent	13 years, 194 days	5 years, 59 days	18 years, 253 days	Judge of Karnataka HC
15	Aravind Kumar		26 June 2009	13 February 2023	Incumbent	13 years, 232 days	3 years, 259 days	17 years, 125 days	26th CJ of Gujarat HC

== Additional Benches ==
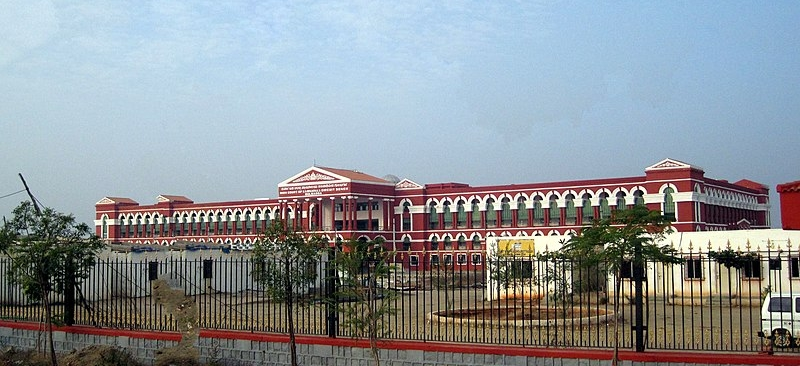
Karnataka High court bench in Kalaburagi.

The Karnataka High Court currently operates in Bengaluru, Hubballi-Dharwada and Kalaburagi. For many years there was a demand for additional benches due to the difficulty faced by people from northern regions of the state, as Bengaluru is located in the southeastern corner. This issue led to agitation, including boycott of court proceedings by lawyers in the northern region. In response, the government decided to establish circuit benches in Hubballi-Dharwada and Kalaburagi in 2006. The new benches were inaugurated on 4 and 5 July 2008, respectively. Subsequently, there was a push to make both the Hubballi-Dharwada and Kalaburagi benches permanent. As a result, the Hubballi-Dharwadaa bench became permanent on from 25 August 2013, followed by the Kalaburagi bench on 31 August 2013.

== Controversies ==
In late 2002, 14 newspapers and periodicals reported allegations of a sex scandal involving some judges of the Karnataka High Court in Mysore. In response, the Chief Justice formed a high-level judicial inquiry committee to investigate the matter. The committee later acquitted the judges, as no substantial evidence could be found to support the allegations.

As of 2023, approximately 2.7 lakh cases were pending in Karnataka High Court, which is facing a significant backlog. The court has struggled with delays due to challenges in adhering to the Karnataka Civil Procedure Code and delivering timely justice.

As of August 2024, approximately 20 Lakh cases are pending across the state, with the High Court serving as the final custodian of justice in these matters.

== See also ==
- Dharwad Bench of the High Court
- Kalaburagi Bench of the High Court
