= K. G. Balakrishnan =

37th Chief Justice of India

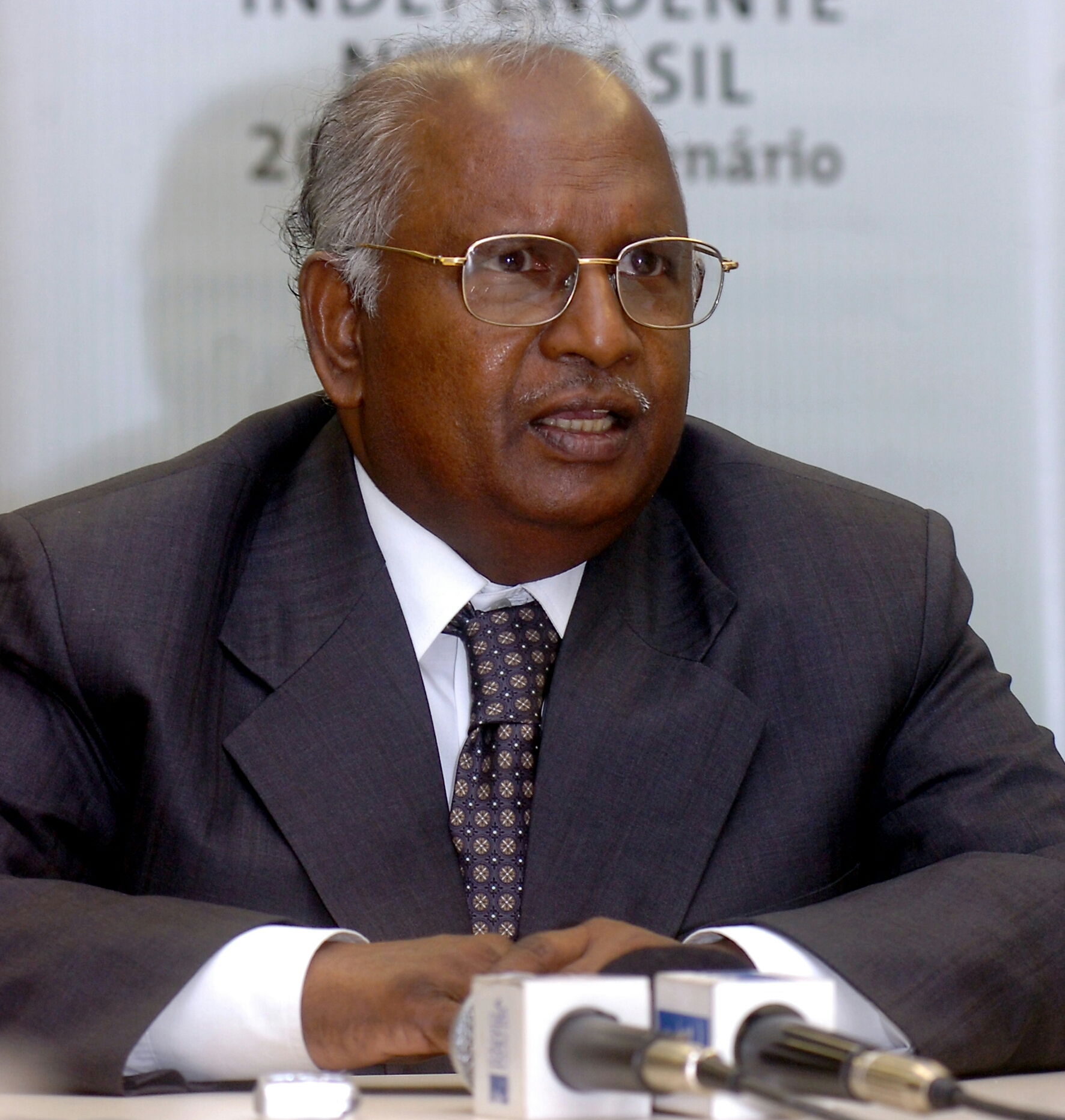
- Justice K. G. Balakrishnan, during an official visit to Brasília in 2008

6th Chairperson of National Human Rights Commission of India
- In office 7 June 2010 – 11 May 2015
- Appointed by: Pratibha Patil
- Preceded by: S. Rajendra Babu
- Succeeded by: H. L. Dattu

37th Chief Justice of India
- In office 14 January 2007 – 11 May 2010
- Appointed by: A. P. J. Abdul Kalam
- Preceded by: Y. K. Sabharwal
- Succeeded by: Sarosh Homi Kapadia

Judge of Supreme Court of India
- In office 8 June 2000 – 14 January 2007
- Nominated by: Adarsh Sein Anand
- Appointed by: K. R. Narayanan

29th Chief Justice of Madras High Court
- In office 9 September 1999 – 5 June 2000
- Nominated by: Adarsh Sein Anand
- Appointed by: K. R. Narayanan
- Preceded by: Ashok Chhotelal Agarwal
- Succeeded by: Nagendra Kumar Jain

16th Chief Justice of Gujarat High Court
- In office 16 July 1998 – 8 September 1999
- Nominated by: M. M. Punchhi
- Appointed by: K. R. Narayanan
- Preceded by: Kumar Sreedharan
- Succeeded by: D. M. Dharmadhikari

Judge of Gujarat High Court
- In office 24 November 1997 – 15 July 1998
- Nominated by: J. S. Verma
- Appointed by: K. R. Narayanan

Judge of Kerala High Court
- In office 26 June 1985 – 23 November 1997
- Nominated by: P. N. Bhagwati
- Appointed by: Zail Singh

Personal details
- Born: 12 May 1945 (age 81) Kaduthuruthy, Travancore, British India
- Spouse: Nirmala Balakrishnan
- Education: Government Law College, Ernakulam

Konakuppakatil Gopinathan Balakrishnan (born 12 May 1945) is an Indian judge who served as the Chief Justice of the Supreme Court of India from 2007 to 2010, and later as chairperson of the National Human Rights Commission of India. He was the first judge from Kerala and the first Dalit to become the Chief Justice of the Supreme Court. He remained the only Dalit to have held the position until the elevation of Bhushan Ramkrishna Gavai as Chief Justice in 2025. His tenure lasting more than three years has been one of the longest in the Supreme Court. While being Chief Justice of Gujarat High Court, he was appointed the acting governor of Gujarat from 16 January 1999 to 18 March 1999. In 2010, he was conferred with an honorary doctorate by Cochin University of Science and Technology.

== Early life and education ==
K. G. Balakrishnan was born as the second son of Sarada and Gopinathan of the Konakuppakkattil house at Appanchira, Kaduthuruthy, near Vaikom, Kingdom of Travancore. According to Balakrishnan, "Though my father was only a matriculate and my mother had her schooling only up to the seventh standard, they wanted to give their children the best education." His father was a clerk in the Vaikom munsiff court and was a classmate of K. R. Narayanan who hailed from Uzhavoor, a village near Vaikom.

After completing his primary education in Thalayolaparambu, he finished school at the Government High School, Vaikom. Subsequently, he joined the Maharaja's College, Ernakulam, where he studied for his B.Sc. He took his Bachelor of Laws (LL.B.) degree from the Government Law College, Ernakulam, and enrolled as an advocate in the Kerala Bar Council in 1968, beginning practice at the Munsiff's court, Vaikom. He then completed his LL.M. in 1971.

== Career ==
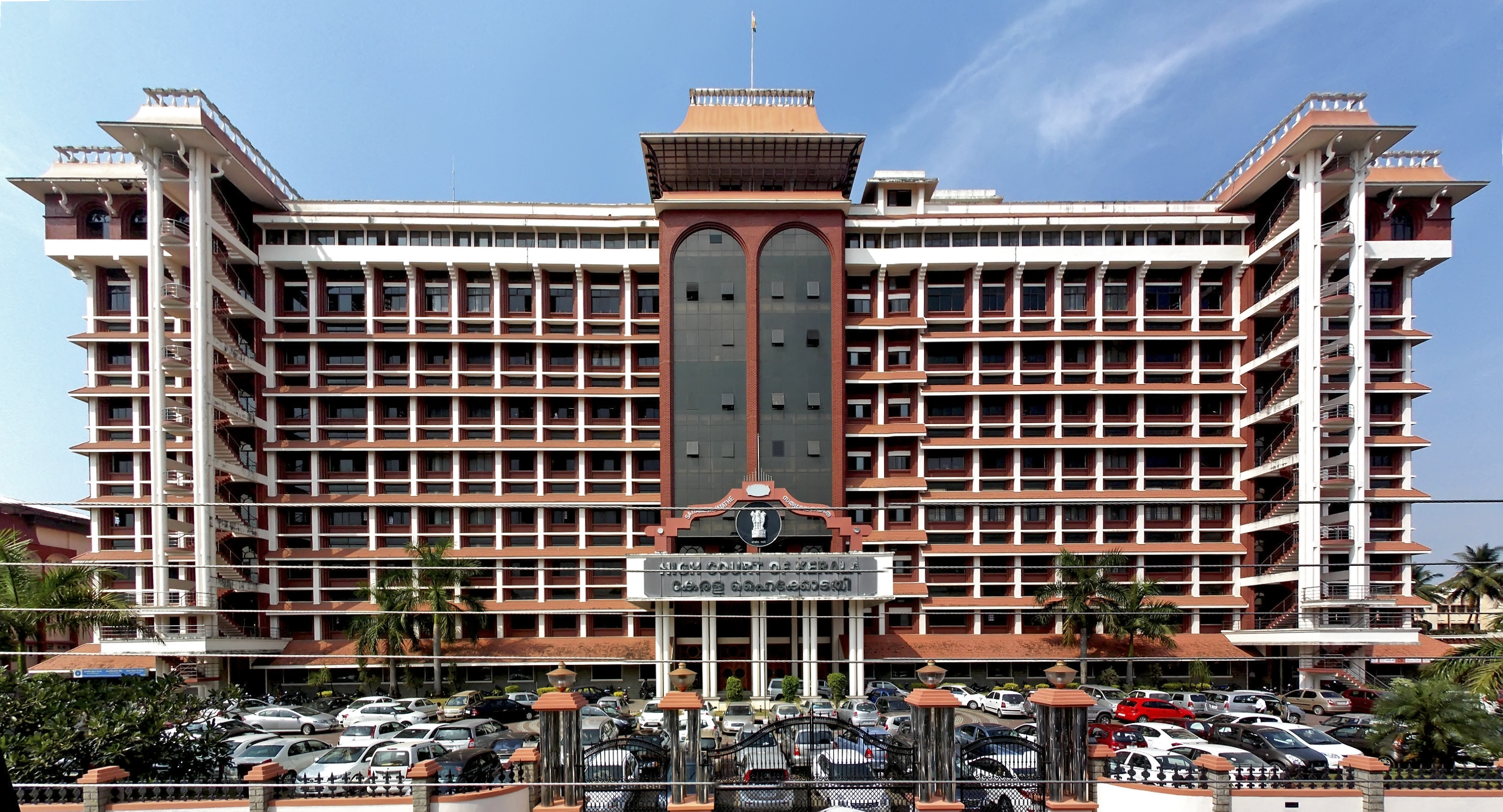
Kerala High Court

As an advocate he pleaded both criminal and civil cases in the Ernakulam court. He was later appointed a Munsiff in the Kerala Judicial Services in 1973. He later resigned from the services and resumed practice as an advocate in the Kerala High Court. In 1985, he was appointed a judge of the Kerala High Court, and was transferred to the Gujarat High Court in 1997. He became the Chief Justice of Gujarat High Court in 1998, and in 1999, he assumed charge as the Chief Justice of the High Court of Judicature at Madras. While being Chief Justice of Gujarat High Court, he was appointed the Acting Governor of Gujarat from 16 January 1999 to 18 March 1999. He also served as Patron in Chief and Executive Chairman of National Legal Service Authority.

He was also served as the Member of the General Council of the Gujarat National Law University.

On 8 June 2000, he was appointed a judge of the Supreme Court. He was sworn in as the Chief Justice of India on 14 January 2007, by then President A. P. J. Abdul Kalam. He became the first Dalit judge to be appointed Chief Justice, and would remain the only Dalit to have held the position until the elevation of Bhushan Ramkrishna Gavai to the position of Chief Justice in May 2025. He retired on 12 May 2010, and served as the Chairman of the National Human Rights Commission from 7 June 2010 till 11 May 2015.

Over the course of his Supreme Court tenure, Justice Balakrishnan authored 219 judgments and sat on 787 benches.

By virtue of being Chief Justice of India, he also administered oath of office to 12th President of India Pratibha Patil.

== Public stances, opinions and views ==
Justice Balakrishnan has tried to exempt the Office of the Chief Justice of India from the purview of the Right to Information Act. He ordered the Supreme Court registry to file an appeal before the Supreme Court against the Delhi High Court judgement making the office of the CJI amenable to the RTI act. He has also spoken about the need for amending the RTI act in the interests of the right to privacy.

Balakrishnan has said "due regard" must be given to the "personal autonomy" of rape victims to decide on whether they should marry the perpetrator or choose to give birth to a child conceived through forced crime. Lawyers and women's rights activists have expressed some reservations.

Justice K. G. Balakrishnan has stated that pornography sites and hate speeches should be banned from the internet. He also passed a judgment stating that journaling on the web any thing hateful even against a political party is liable for censorship.

On a visit to Kasaragode as NHRC Chairman initiating suo motu complaint, Balakrishnan felt there had been violations of human rights against the populace by the harmful spraying of the pesticide Endosulfan, and recommended the founding of a super-speciality hospital for the relief of the victims.

== Notable judgments ==
In a Kerala High Court judgement he asked the election commission to debar the political parties which impose hartals on the public causing them suffering.

Making distribution of lunch compulsory in schools.

He was a part of the three-member Supreme Court bench that decided a public interest litigation (PIL) filed by two National Democratic Alliance leaders seeking the cancellation of bail of Rashtriya Janata Dal chief Lalu Prasad and his wife and former Bihar Chief Minister Rabri Devi for their interference in the judicial process in the disproportionate assets (DA) and Income Tax cases against them. The verdict (2-1) went in favour of Prasad. Justice Balakrishnan and Justice Lakshmanan said according to Article 233 of the Constitution of India the Governor has power to appoint a judge in the subordinate judiciary in consultation with the High Court Administration and held that it was the prerogative of the government to appoint any lawyer as public prosecutor. However, Justice S H Kapadia gave a dissenting judgement saying the income tax department should have filed an appeal against the Income Tax Appellate Tribunal (ITAT) order. On the issue of promotion of judge Munni Lal Paswan, he said, while competence and suitability of two other judges, who were promoted to the post of Special Judge along with Paswan, were determined on the basis of annual confidential report (ACRs) and inspecting the judges' reports, the criteria were not applied while promoting Paswan who had been found to be slow in disposing cases.

In 2010, he passed a judgement prohibiting narcoanalysis in interrogations.

== Controversies ==
Justice H. L. Gokhale of the Supreme Court has accused Balakrishnan of misrepresenting facts to conceal sacked telecom minister A. Raja's attempt to influence Justice R. Reghupathy of the Madras High Court, on behalf of two murder accused known to the DMK leader. A petition-seeking vigilance probe into the allegations of "amassment of wealth disproportionate to their sources of income" by Balakrishnan's family members, was filed before the Income Tax Vigilance and Anti-Corruption Bureau. In February 2012, the Supreme Court of India in a case filed by the NGO Common Cause, inquired of the government as to the progress in the probe against Justice Balakrishnan.

== Personal life ==
Justice K. G. Balakrishnan is married to Nirmala and they have a son and two daughters - Pradeep, Sony and Rani. He has 5 brothers and 2 sisters. His younger brother K. G. Bhaskaran was government pleader in Kerala High Court and another brother K. G. Raju was conferred IAS by Kerala Government and served as District Collector for Wayanad, Kerala.

== Quotes ==
- "Really, it is a matter of pride for us, but what I achieved is the result of hard labour and integrity."
- "Both advocates and judges have an equal responsibility towards the society. So both deserve equal respect from the people."
- "The forcible strikes by political parties has a very bad effect on common people. You can see how patients, passengers, and children suffer during strikes."
- "Trial and defence lawyers should not terrorise witnesses. A judge should be alert and caring."
- "Any dilution of the right to a fair trial for all individuals, however heinous their crimes may be, will be a moral loss against those who preach hatred and violence."
- "In India, different types of crimes are on the increase. The death penalty will have a deterrent effect on the people. If you analyse [the cases], many of those who were given death penalty really deserved it in the cases imposed [on them]."

Legal offices
Preceded by Yogesh Kumar Sabharwal	Chief Justice of India; 14 January 2007 – 12 May 2010	Succeeded by S. H. Kapadia
Government offices
Preceded by Anshuman Singh	Governor of Gujarat (Acting); Jan 1999 – March 1999	Succeeded by Sunder Singh Bhandari
