= List of sitting judges of the Supreme Court of India =

Current sitting judges of the Supreme Court of India

Insignia of the Supreme Court of India

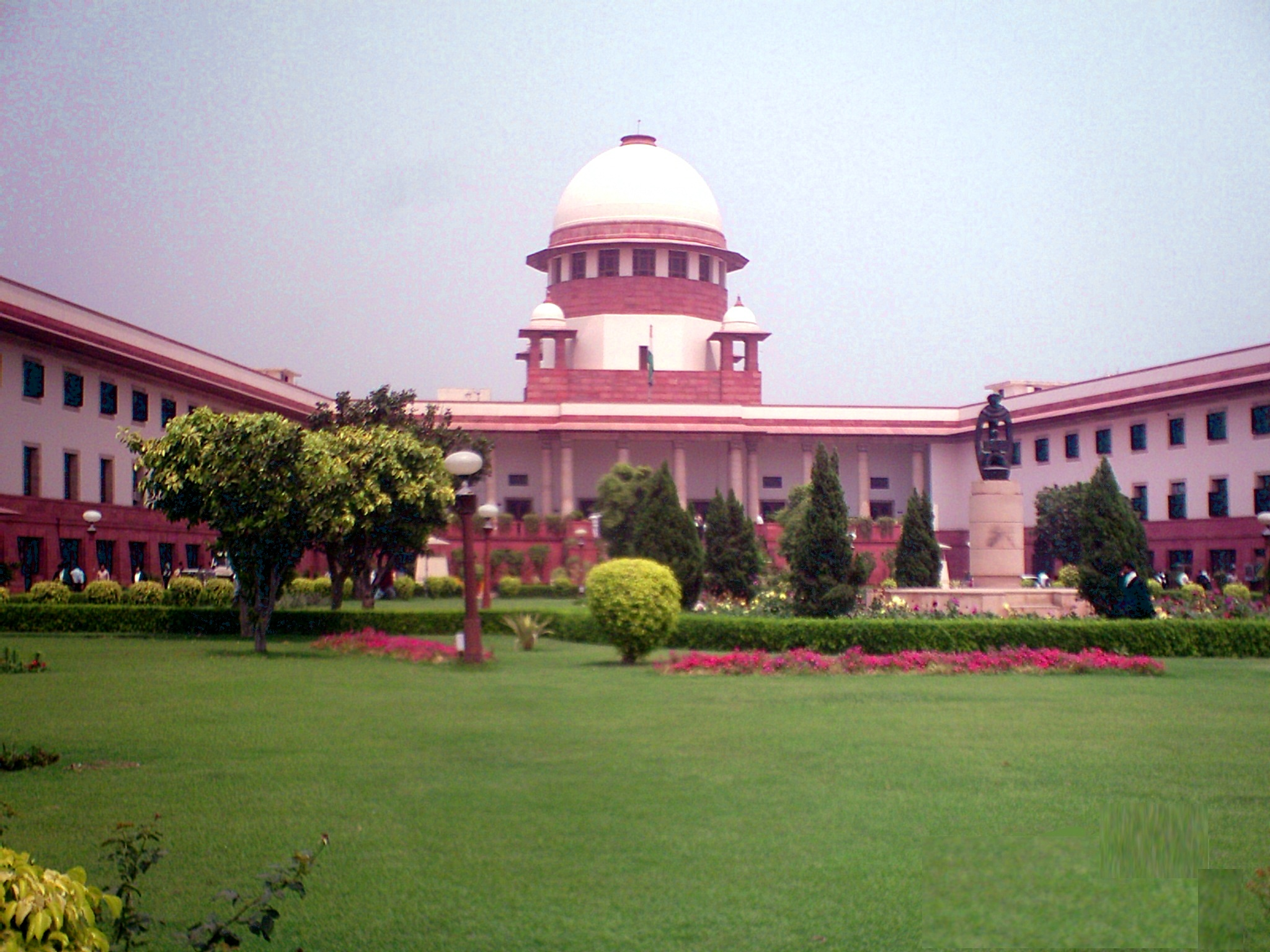
The Supreme Court of India, in New Delhi

The Supreme Court of India is the highest court in the country. The Court's maximum sanctioned strength is 38, comprising the Chief Justice and 37 judges. According to the Constitution of India, the judges of the Supreme Court must retire at the age of 65. There are currently 37 judges (including the Chief Justice) in the Supreme Court of India.

President Droupadi Murmu has given her assent to the supreme court (Numbers of Judges) Amendment Act 2026, which increases sanctioned strength of Supreme Court judges from 34 to 38, including the Chief Justice of India. The Act was approved on August 11, 2026.

At present, the Chief Justice of India is Surya Kant. He was sworn in as the 53rd CJI on 24 November 2025.The Supreme Court at present has 3 female judges: B. V. Nagarathna, V. Mohana and Sunita Agarwal.

== List of judges ordered by seniority ==
Sr. No.	Image	Name	Date of Appointment	Becomes CJI on	Date of Retirement	Tenure Length	Parent High Court	Appointed by	Date of appointment as High Court Judge	Seniority rank on the date of elevation
1		Surya Kant (Chief Justice of India)	24 May 2019 (7 years, 156 days); Appointed as CJI on 24 November 2025 (337 days)	24 November 2025	9 February 2027 (−105 days)	7 years, 262 days Tenure length as CJI; 1 year, 78 days	Punjab and Haryana	Ram Nath Kovind; Appointed as CJI by Droupadi Murmu	9 January 2004 (22 years, 291 days)	11
2		Vikram Nath	31 August 2021 (5 years, 57 days)	10 February 2027	23 September 2027 (−331 days)	6 years, 24 days	Allahabad	Ram Nath Kovind	24 September 2004 (22 years, 33 days)	4
3		Bengaluru Venkataramiah Nagarathna	31 August 2021 (5 years, 57 days)	24 September 2027	29 October 2027 (−1 year, 2 days)	6 years, 60 days	Karnataka	Ram Nath Kovind	18 February 2008 (18 years, 251 days)	29
4		M. M. Sundresh	31 August 2021 (5 years, 57 days)	-	20 July 2027 (−266 days)	5 years, 324 days	Madras	Ram Nath Kovind	31 March 2009 (17 years, 210 days)	46
5		Pamidighantam Sri Narasimha	31 August 2021 (5 years, 57 days)	30 October 2027	2 May 2028 (−1 year, 188 days)	6 years, 246 days	Bar Council	Ram Nath Kovind	N/A	N/A
6		Jamshed Burjor Pardiwala	9 May 2022 (4 years, 171 days)	3 May 2028	11 August 2030 (−3 years, 288 days)	8 years, 95 days	Gujarat	Ram Nath Kovind	17 February 2011 (15 years, 252 days)	49
7		Dipankar Datta	12 December 2022 (3 years, 319 days)	-	8 February 2030 (−3 years, 104 days)	7 years, 59 days	Calcutta	Droupadi Murmu	22 June 2006 (20 years, 127 days)	6
8		Puligoru Venkata Sanjay Kumar	6 February 2023 (3 years, 263 days)	-	13 August 2028 (−1 year, 291 days)	5 years, 190 days	Telangana	Droupadi Murmu	8 August 2008 (18 years, 80 days)	20
9		Ahsanuddin Amanullah	6 February 2023 (3 years, 263 days)	-	10 May 2028 (−1 year, 196 days)	5 years, 95 days	Patna	Droupadi Murmu	20 June 2011 (15 years, 129 days)	42
10		Manoj Misra	6 February 2023 (3 years, 263 days)	-	1 June 2030 (−3 years, 217 days)	7 years, 116 days	Allahabad	Droupadi Murmu	21 November 2011 (14 years, 340 days)	52
11		Aravind Kumar	13 February 2023 (3 years, 256 days)	-	13 July 2027 (−259 days)	4 years, 152 days	Karnataka	Droupadi Murmu	26 June 2009 (17 years, 123 days)	23
12		Prashant Kumar Mishra	19 May 2023 (3 years, 161 days)	-	28 August 2029 (−2 years, 305 days)	6 years, 102 days	Chhattisgarh	Droupadi Murmu	10 December 2009 (16 years, 321 days)	21
13		Kalpathy Venkataraman Viswanathan	19 May 2023 (3 years, 161 days)	12 August 2030	25 May 2031 (−4 years, 210 days)	8 years, 7 days	Bar Council	Droupadi Murmu	N/A	N/A
14		Ujjal Bhuyan	14 July 2023 (3 years, 105 days)	-	1 August 2029 (−2 years, 278 days)	6 years, 19 days	Gauhati	Droupadi Murmu	17 October 2011 (15 years, 10 days)	31
15		Sarasa Venkatanarayana Bhatti	14 July 2023 (3 years, 105 days)	-	5 May 2027 (−190 days)	3 years, 296 days	Andhra Pradesh	Droupadi Murmu	12 April 2013 (13 years, 198 days)	49
16		Satish Chandra Sharma	9 November 2023 (2 years, 352 days)	-	29 November 2026 (−33 days)	3 years, 21 days	Madhya Pradesh	Droupadi Murmu	18 January 2008 (18 years, 282 days)	2
17		Augustine George Masih	9 November 2023 (2 years, 352 days)	-	11 March 2028 (−1 year, 136 days)	4 years, 124 days	Punjab and Haryana	Droupadi Murmu	10 July 2008 (18 years, 109 days)	7
18		Sandeep Mehta	9 November 2023 (2 years, 352 days)	-	10 January 2028 (−1 year, 75 days)	4 years, 63 days	Rajasthan	Droupadi Murmu	30 May 2011 (15 years, 150 days)	23
19		Prasanna Bhalachandra Varale	25 January 2024 (2 years, 275 days)	-	22 June 2027 (−238 days)	3 years, 149 days	Bombay	Droupadi Murmu	18 July 2008 (18 years, 101 days)	6
20		Nongmeikapam Kotiswar Singh	18 July 2024 (2 years, 101 days)	-	29 February 2028 (−1 year, 125 days)	3 years, 227 days	Manipur	Droupadi Murmu	17 October 2011 (15 years, 10 days)	17
21		R. Mahadevan	18 July 2024 (2 years, 101 days)	-	9 June 2028 (−1 year, 226 days)	3 years, 328 days	Madras	Droupadi Murmu	25 October 2013 (13 years, 2 days)	51
22		Manmohan	5 December 2024 (1 year, 326 days)	-	16 December 2027 (−1 year, 50 days)	3 years, 12 days	Delhi	Droupadi Murmu	13 March 2008 (18 years, 228 days)	2
23		Krishnan Vinod Chandran	16 January 2025 (1 year, 284 days)	-	24 April 2028 (−1 year, 180 days)	3 years, 100 days	Kerala	Droupadi Murmu	8 November 2011 (14 years, 353 days)	13
24		Joymalya Bagchi	17 March 2025 (1 year, 224 days)	26 May 2031	2 October 2031 (−4 years, 340 days)	6 years, 200 days	Calcutta	Droupadi Murmu	27 June 2011 (15 years, 122 days)	11
25		Nilay Vipinchandra Anjaria	30 May 2025 (1 year, 150 days)	-	22 March 2030 (−3 years, 146 days)	4 years, 297 days	Gujarat	Droupadi Murmu	21 November 2011 (14 years, 340 days)	14
26		Vijay Bishnoi	30 May 2025 (1 year, 150 days)	-	25 March 2029 (−2 years, 149 days)	3 years, 300 days	Rajasthan	Droupadi Murmu	8 January 2013 (13 years, 292 days)	18
27		Atul Sharachchandra Chandurkar	30 May 2025 (1 year, 150 days)	-	6 April 2030 (−3 years, 161 days)	4 years, 312 days	Bombay	Droupadi Murmu	21 June 2013 (13 years, 128 days)	29
28		Alok Aradhe	29 August 2025 (1 year, 59 days)	-	12 April 2029 (−2 years, 167 days)	3 years, 227 days	Madhya Pradesh	Droupadi Murmu	29 December 2009 (16 years, 302 days)	5
29		Vipul Manubhai Pancholi	29 August 2025 (1 year, 59 days)	3 October 2031	27 May 2033 (−6 years, 212 days)	7 years, 272 days	Gujarat	Droupadi Murmu	1 October 2014 (12 years, 26 days)	57
30		Sheel Nagu	2 June 2026 (147 days)	-	31 December 2029 (−3 years, 65 days)	3 years, 213 days	Madhya Pradesh	Droupadi Murmu	27 May 2011 (15 years, 153 days)	3
31		Shree Chandrashekhar	2 June 2026 (147 days)	-	24 May 2030 (−3 years, 209 days)	3 years, 357 days	Jharkhand	Droupadi Murmu	17 January 2013 (13 years, 283 days)	12
32		Sanjeev Sachdeva	2 June 2026 (147 days)	-	25 December 2029 (−3 years, 59 days)	3 years, 207 days	Delhi	Droupadi Murmu	17 April 2013 (13 years, 193 days)	14
33		Arun Palli	2 June 2026 (147 days)		17 September 2029 (−2 years, 325 days)	3 years, 108 days	Punjab and Haryana	Droupadi Murmu	28 December 2013 (12 years, 303 days)	28
34		Venkita Subramani Mohana	2 June 2026 (147 days)	-	26 June 2031 (−4 years, 242 days)	5 years, 25 days	Bar Council	Droupadi Murmu	N/A	N/A
35		Sunita Agarwal	6 October 2026 (21 days)	-	29 April 2031 (−4 years, 184 days)	4 years, 206 days	Allahabad	Droupadi Murmu	21 November 2011 (14 years, 340 days)	4
36		Devendra Kumar Upadhyaya	6 October 2026 (21 days)	-	15 June 2030 (−3 years, 231 days)	3 years, 253 days	Allahabad	Droupadi Murmu	21 November 2011 (14 years, 340 days)	5
37		Aparesh Kumar Singh	6 October 2026 (21 days)	-	6 July 2030 (−3 years, 252 days)	3 years, 274 days	Jharkhand	Droupadi Murmu	24 January 2012 (14 years, 276 days)	6

== Members of the Collegium ==
Sr. No.	Member	Since	
Sr. No.	Member	For Appointment in Supreme Court	For Appointment in High Courts
1	Surya Kant (CJI)	18 June 2023 (3 years, 131 days); JoR – Ajay Rastogi	11 November 2024 (1 year, 350 days); JoR – D. Y. Chandrachud (CJI)
2	Vikram Nath	1 February 2025 (1 year, 268 days); JoR – Hrishikesh Roy	25 May 2025 (1 year, 155 days); JoR – A. S. Oka
3	Bengaluru Venkataramiah Nagarathna	25 May 2025 (1 year, 155 days); JoR – A. S. Oka	29 June 2026 (120 days); JoR – J. K. Maheshwari
4	M. M. Sundresh	24 November 2025 (337 days); JoR – B. R. Gavai (CJI)	Not a member
5	Pamidighantam Sri Narasimha	29 June 2026 (120 days); JoR – J. K. Maheshwari	Not a member

JoR - Joined on retirement of

== Additional Information about the Sitting Judges ==
CJ - Chief Justice

HC - High Court

Sr. No.	Name	Image	Nominated by the Collegium (led by CJI)		Office at the time of elevation (Period)	Other previous offices (Period)
Sr. No.	Name	Image	As Judge of Supreme Court	As Judge of High Court	Office at the time of elevation (Period)	Other previous offices (Period)
1	Surya Kant (Chief Justice of India)		46th CJI Ranjan Gogoi	33rd CJI Vishweshwar Nath Khare	23rd CJ of Himachal Pradesh HC (5 October 2018 – 23 May 2019)	Judge of Punjab & Haryana HC (2004 – 2018)
1	Surya Kant (Chief Justice of India)		46th CJI Ranjan Gogoi	33rd CJI Vishweshwar Nath Khare	23rd CJ of Himachal Pradesh HC (5 October 2018 – 23 May 2019)	Advocate General of Haryana (2000 – 2004)
2	Vikram Nath		48th CJI Nuthalapati Venkata Ramana	35th CJI Ramesh Chandra Lahoti	25th CJ of Gujarat HC (10 September 2019 – 30 August 2021)	Judge of Allahabad HC (2004 – 2019)
3	Bengaluru Venkataramiah Nagarathna		48th CJI Nuthalapati Venkata Ramana	37th CJI Konakuppakatil Gopinathan Balakrishnan	Judge of Karnataka HC (18 February 2008 – 30 August 2021)	
4	M. M. Sundresh		48th CJI Nuthalapati Venkata Ramana	37th CJI Konakuppakatil Gopinathan Balakrishnan	Judge of Madras HC (31 March 2009 – 30 August 2021)	
5	Pamidighantam Sri Narasimha		48th CJI Nuthalapati Venkata Ramana	N/A	--	Additional Solicitor General of India (2014 – 2018)
6	Jamshed Burjor Pardiwala		48th CJI Nuthalapati Venkata Ramana	38th CJI Sarosh Homi Kapadia	Judge of Gujarat HC (17 February 2011 – 8 May 2022)	
7	Dipankar Datta		49th CJI Uday Umesh Lalit	36th CJI Yogesh Kumar Sabharwal	45th CJ of Bombay HC (28 April 2020 – 11 December 2022)	Judge of Calcutta HC (2006 – 2020)
8	Puligoru Venkata Sanjay Kumar		50th CJI Dhananjaya Yeshwant Chandrachud	37th CJI Konakuppakatil Gopinathan Balakrishnan	6th CJ of Manipur HC (14 February 2021 – 5 February 2023)	Judge of Punjab & Haryana HC (2019 – 2021)
8	Puligoru Venkata Sanjay Kumar		50th CJI Dhananjaya Yeshwant Chandrachud	37th CJI Konakuppakatil Gopinathan Balakrishnan	6th CJ of Manipur HC (14 February 2021 – 5 February 2023)	Judge of Telangana HC (2008 – 2019)
9	Ahsanuddin Amanullah		50th CJI Dhananjaya Yeshwant Chandrachud	38th CJI Sarosh Homi Kapadia	Judge of Patna HC (20 June 2022 – 6 February 2023) Also from (Jun 2011 – Jan 2021)	Judge of Andhra Pradesh HC (2021 – 2022)
10	Manoj Misra		50th CJI Dhananjaya Yeshwant Chandrachud	38th CJI Sarosh Homi Kapadia	Judge of Allahabad HC (21 November 2011 – 5 February 2023)	
11	Aravind Kumar		50th CJI Dhananjaya Yeshwant Chandrachud	37th CJI Konakuppakatil Gopinathan Balakrishnan	26th CJ of Gujarat HC (13 October 2021 – 12 February 2023)	Judge of Karnataka HC (2009 – 2021)
12	Prashant Kumar Mishra		50th CJI Dhananjaya Yeshwant Chandrachud	37th CJI Konakuppakatil Gopinathan Balakrishnan	3rd CJ of Andhra Pradesh HC (13 October 2021 – 18 May 2023)	Judge of Chhattisgarh HC (2009 – 2021)
12	Prashant Kumar Mishra		50th CJI Dhananjaya Yeshwant Chandrachud	37th CJI Konakuppakatil Gopinathan Balakrishnan	3rd CJ of Andhra Pradesh HC (13 October 2021 – 18 May 2023)	Advocate General of Chhattisgarh (2007 – 2009)
13	Kalpathy Venkataraman Viswanathan		50th CJI Dhananjaya Yeshwant Chandrachud	N/A	--	Additional Solicitor General of India (2013 – 2014)
14	Ujjal Bhuyan		50th CJI Dhananjaya Yeshwant Chandrachud	38th CJI Sarosh Homi Kapadia	5th CJ of Telangana HC (28 June 2022 – 13 July 2023)	Judge of Telangana HC (2021 – 2022)
14	Ujjal Bhuyan		50th CJI Dhananjaya Yeshwant Chandrachud	38th CJI Sarosh Homi Kapadia	5th CJ of Telangana HC (28 June 2022 – 13 July 2023)	Judge of Bombay HC (2019 – 2021)
14	Ujjal Bhuyan		50th CJI Dhananjaya Yeshwant Chandrachud	38th CJI Sarosh Homi Kapadia	5th CJ of Telangana HC (28 June 2022 – 13 July 2023)	Judge of Gauhati HC (2011 – 2019)
15	Sarasa Venkatanarayana Bhatti		50th CJI Dhananjaya Yeshwant Chandrachud	39th CJI Altamas Kabir	37th CJ of Kerala HC (1 June 2023 – 14 July 2023)	Judge of Kerala HC (2019 – 2023)
15	Sarasa Venkatanarayana Bhatti		50th CJI Dhananjaya Yeshwant Chandrachud	39th CJI Altamas Kabir	37th CJ of Kerala HC (1 June 2023 – 14 July 2023)	Judge of Andhra Pradesh HC (2013 – 2019)
16	Satish Chandra Sharma		50th CJI Dhananjaya Yeshwant Chandrachud	37th CJI Konakuppakatil Gopinathan Balakrishnan	32nd CJ of Delhi HC (28 June 2022 – 8 November 2023)	4th CJ of Telangana HC (11 October 2021 – 27 June 2022)
16	Satish Chandra Sharma		50th CJI Dhananjaya Yeshwant Chandrachud	37th CJI Konakuppakatil Gopinathan Balakrishnan	32nd CJ of Delhi HC (28 June 2022 – 8 November 2023)	Judge of Karnataka HC (2021)
16	Satish Chandra Sharma		50th CJI Dhananjaya Yeshwant Chandrachud	37th CJI Konakuppakatil Gopinathan Balakrishnan	32nd CJ of Delhi HC (28 June 2022 – 8 November 2023)	Judge of Madhya Pradesh HC (2008 – 2021)
17	Augustine George Masih		50th CJI Dhananjaya Yeshwant Chandrachud	37th CJI Konakuppakatil Gopinathan Balakrishnan	41st CJ of Rajasthan HC (30 May 2023 – 8 November 2023)	Judge of Punjab & Haryana HC (2008 – 2023)
18	Sandeep Mehta		50th CJI Dhananjaya Yeshwant Chandrachud	38th CJI Sarosh Homi Kapadia	41st CJ of Gauhati HC (15 February 2023 – 8 November 2023)	Judge of Rajasthan HC (2011 – 2023)
19	Prasanna Bhalachandra Varale		50th CJI Dhananjaya Yeshwant Chandrachud	37th CJI Konakuppakatil Gopinathan Balakrishnan	32nd CJ of Karnataka HC (15 October 2022 – 24 January 2024)	Judge of Bombay HC (2008 – 2022)
20	Nongmeikapam Kotiswar Singh		50th CJI Dhananjaya Yeshwant Chandrachud	38th CJI Sarosh Homi Kapadia	36th CJ of Jammu & Kashmir and Ladakh HC (15 February 2023 – 17 July 2024)	Judge of Gauhati HC (2011 – 2013) Also from (Oct 2018 – Feb 2023)
20	Nongmeikapam Kotiswar Singh		50th CJI Dhananjaya Yeshwant Chandrachud	38th CJI Sarosh Homi Kapadia	36th CJ of Jammu & Kashmir and Ladakh HC (15 February 2023 – 17 July 2024)	Judge of Manipur HC (2013 – 2018)
20	Nongmeikapam Kotiswar Singh		50th CJI Dhananjaya Yeshwant Chandrachud	38th CJI Sarosh Homi Kapadia	36th CJ of Jammu & Kashmir and Ladakh HC (15 February 2023 – 17 July 2024)	Advocate General of Manipur (2007 – 2011)
21	R. Mahadevan		50th CJI Dhananjaya Yeshwant Chandrachud	40th CJI Palanisamy Sathasivam	Acting CJ of Madras HC (24 May 2024 – 17 July 2024)	Judge of Madras HC (2013 – 2024)
22	Manmohan		51st CJI Sanjiv Khanna	37th CJI Konakuppakatil Gopinathan Balakrishnan	33rd CJ of Delhi HC (29 September 2024 – 4 December 2024)	Judge of Delhi HC (5 October 2018 – 2024)
23	Krishnan Vinod Chandran		51st CJI Sanjiv Khanna	38th CJI Sarosh Homi Kapadia	44th CJ of Patna HC (29 March 2023 – 15 January 2025)	Judge of Kerala HC (2011 – 2023)
24	Joymalya Bagchi		51st CJI Sanjiv Khanna	38th CJI Sarosh Homi Kapadia	Judge of Calcutta HC (8 November 2021 – 16 March 2025) Also from (Jun 2011 – Jan 2021)	Judge of Andhra Pradesh HC (2021)
25	Nilay Vipinchandra Anjaria		52nd CJI Bhushan Ramkrishna Gavai	38th CJI Sarosh Homi Kapadia	34th CJ of Karnataka HC (25 February 2024 – 29 May 2025)	Judge of Gujarat HC (2011 – 2024)
26	Vijay Bishnoi		52nd CJI Bhushan Ramkrishna Gavai	39th CJI Altamas Kabir	42nd CJ of Gauhati HC (5 February 2024 – 29 May 2025)	Judge of Rajasthan HC (2013 – 2024)
27	Atul Sharachchandra Chandurkar		52nd CJI Bhushan Ramkrishna Gavai	39th CJI Altamas Kabir	Judge of Bombay HC (21 June 2013 – 29 May 2025)	
28	Alok Aradhe		52nd CJI Bhushan Ramkrishna Gavai	37th CJI Konakuppakatil Gopinathan Balakrishnan	48th CJ of Bombay HC (21 January 2025 – 28 August 2025)	6th CJ of Telangana HC (23 July 2023 – 20 January 2025)
28	Alok Aradhe		52nd CJI Bhushan Ramkrishna Gavai	37th CJI Konakuppakatil Gopinathan Balakrishnan	48th CJ of Bombay HC (21 January 2025 – 28 August 2025)	Judge of Karnataka HC (2018 – 2023)
28	Alok Aradhe		52nd CJI Bhushan Ramkrishna Gavai	37th CJI Konakuppakatil Gopinathan Balakrishnan	48th CJ of Bombay HC (21 January 2025 – 28 August 2025)	Judge of Jammu & Kashmir and Ladakh HC (2016 – 2018)
28	Alok Aradhe		52nd CJI Bhushan Ramkrishna Gavai	37th CJI Konakuppakatil Gopinathan Balakrishnan	48th CJ of Bombay HC (21 January 2025 – 28 August 2025)	Judge of Madhya Pradesh HC (2009 – 2016)
29	Vipul Manubhai Pancholi		52nd CJI Bhushan Ramkrishna Gavai	41st CJI Rajendra Mal Lodha	45th CJ of Patna HC (21 July 2025 – 28 August 2025)	Judge of Patna HC (2023 – 2025)
29	Vipul Manubhai Pancholi		52nd CJI Bhushan Ramkrishna Gavai	41st CJI Rajendra Mal Lodha	45th CJ of Patna HC (21 July 2025 – 28 August 2025)	Judge of Gujarat HC (2014 – 2023)
30	Sheel Nagu		53rd CJI Surya Kant	38th CJI Sarosh Homi Kapadia	36th CJ of Punjab and Haryana HC (9 July 2024 – 1 June 2026)	Judge of Madhya Pradesh HC (2011 – 2024)
31	Shree Chandrashekhar		53rd CJI Surya Kant	39th CJI Altamas Kabir	49th CJ of Bombay HC (5 September 2025 – 1 June 2026)	Judge of Bombay HC (2025)
31	Shree Chandrashekhar		53rd CJI Surya Kant	39th CJI Altamas Kabir	49th CJ of Bombay HC (5 September 2025 – 1 June 2026)	Judge of Rajasthan HC (2024 – 2025)
31	Shree Chandrashekhar		53rd CJI Surya Kant	39th CJI Altamas Kabir	49th CJ of Bombay HC (5 September 2025 – 1 June 2026)	Judge of Jharkhand HC (2013 – 2024)
32	Sanjeev Sachdeva		53rd CJI Surya Kant	39th CJI Altamas Kabir	29th CJ of Madhya Pradesh HC (17 July 2025 – 1 June 2026)	Judge of Madhya Pradesh HC (2024 – 2025)
32	Sanjeev Sachdeva		53rd CJI Surya Kant	39th CJI Altamas Kabir	29th CJ of Madhya Pradesh HC (17 July 2025 – 1 June 2026)	Judge of Delhi HC (2013 – 2024)
33	Arun Palli		53rd CJI Surya Kant	40th CJI Palanisamy Sathasivam	38th CJ of Jammu & Kashmir and Ladakh HC (16 April 2025 – 1 June 2026)	Judge of Punjab and Haryana HC (2013 – 2025)
34	Venkita Subramani Mohana		53rd CJI Surya Kant	N/A	--	--
35	Sunita Agarwal		53rd CJI Surya Kant	38th CJI Sarosh Homi Kapadia	28th CJ of Gujarat HC (23 July 2023 – 5 October 2026)	Judge of Allahabad HC (2011 – 2023)
36	Devendra Kumar Upadhyaya		53rd CJI Surya Kant	38th CJI Sarosh Homi Kapadia	34th CJ of Delhi HC (21 January 2025 – 5 October 2026)	47th CJ of Bombay HC (29 July 2023 – 20 January 2025)
36	Devendra Kumar Upadhyaya		53rd CJI Surya Kant	38th CJI Sarosh Homi Kapadia	34th CJ of Delhi HC (21 January 2025 – 5 October 2026)	Judge of Allahabad HC (2011 – 2023)
37	Aparesh Kumar Singh		53rd CJI Surya Kant	39th CJI Altamas Kabir	7th CJ of Telangana HC (19 July 2025 – 5 October 2026)	8th CJ of Tripura HC (17 April 2023 – 18 July 2025)
37	Aparesh Kumar Singh		53rd CJI Surya Kant	39th CJI Altamas Kabir	7th CJ of Telangana HC (19 July 2025 – 5 October 2026)	Judge of Jharkhand HC (2012 – 2023)

== See also ==
- List of chief justices of India
- List of former judges of the Supreme Court of India
- List of female judges of the Supreme Court of India
- List of sitting judges of the high courts of India
