= List of chief justices of India =

List of Chief Justices of the Supreme Court of India

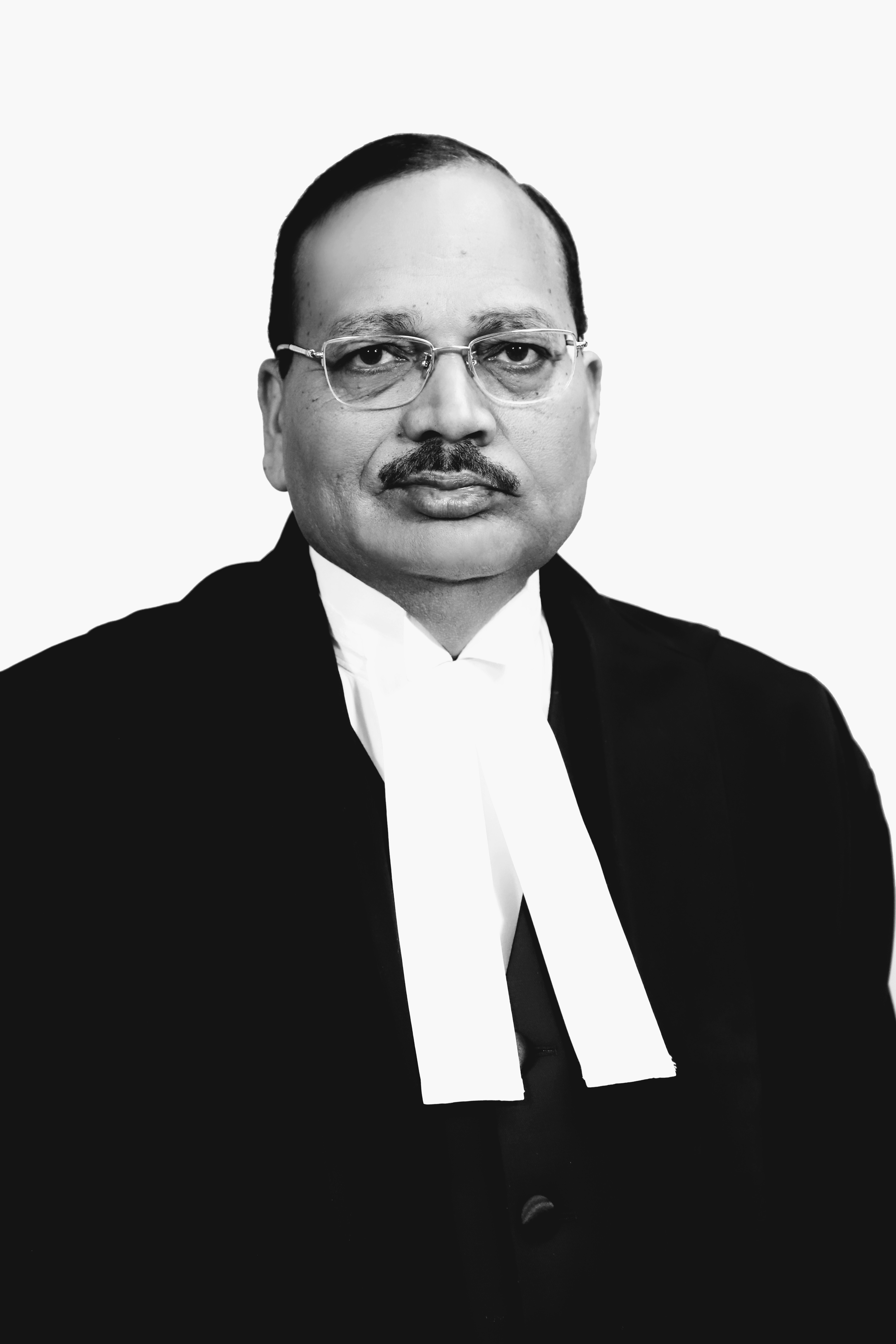
Surya Kant, the current CJI since 24 November 2025

The chief justice of India is the highest-ranking officer of the Indian judiciary and the chief judge of the Supreme Court of India. As head of the Supreme Court, the chief justice is responsible for the allocation of cases and appointment of constitutional benches which deal with important matters of law. In accordance with Article 145 of the Constitution of India and the Supreme Court Rules of Procedure of 1966, the chief justice allocates all work to the other judges.

A new chief justice is appointed by the president of India with recommendations by the outgoing chief justice in consultation with other judges. The chief justice serves in the role until they reach the age of sixty-five or are removed by the constitutional process of impeachment. As per convention, the name suggested by the incumbent chief justice is almost always the next senior-most judge in the Supreme Court. This convention has been broken twice: in 1973, Justice A. N. Ray was appointed superseding three senior judges and in 1977, Justice Mirza Hameedullah Beg was appointed as the chief justice superseding Justice Hans Raj Khanna.

A total of 53 chief justices have served in the office since the Supreme Court of India superseded the Federal Court of India in 1950. Yeshwant Vishnu Chandrachud, the 16th chief justice, is the longest-serving chief justice, serving over seven years (February 1978 – July 1985), while Kamal Narain Singh, the 22nd chief justice, is the shortest-serving, for 17 days in 1991. As of 2025, there has been no woman who has served as chief justice of India. The current and 53rd chief justice is Surya Kant who entered office on 24 November 2025. He will have a term of 15 months which is due to end on 9 February 2027.

== List ==
=== Chief Justices of the Federal Court of India ===
The Federal Court of India came into being on 1 October 1937. The seat of the court was in Delhi and it functioned until the establishment of the Supreme Court of India on 28 January 1950. The first chief justice was Sir Maurice Gwyer.

Key

‡ Acting Chief Justice

Chief Justices of the Federal Court of India
No.	Name (birth–death)	Image	Start of Term	End of Term	Length of term	Parent Bar / High Court	Appointed by (Governor-General of India)	Ref.
1	Sir Maurice Linford Gwyer (1878–1952)	Maurice Linford Gwyer	1 October 1937	25 April 1943	5 years, 206 days	Inner Temple	Victor Hope	
—	Sir Srinivas Varadachariar^{‡} (1881–1970)	—	25 April 1943	7 June 1943	43 days	Madras	Victor Hope	
2	Sir William Patrick Spens (1885–1973)	William Patrick Spens	7 June 1943	13 August 1947	4 years, 68 days	Inner Temple	Victor Hope	
3	Harilal Jekisundas Kania (1890–1951)	Harilal Jekisundas Kania	14 August 1947	26 January 1950	2 years, 165 days	Bombay	Louis Mountbatten	

=== Chief Justices ===
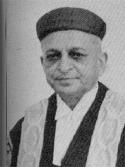
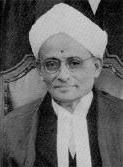
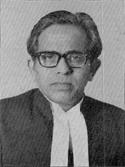
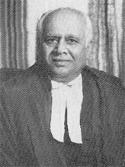
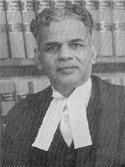
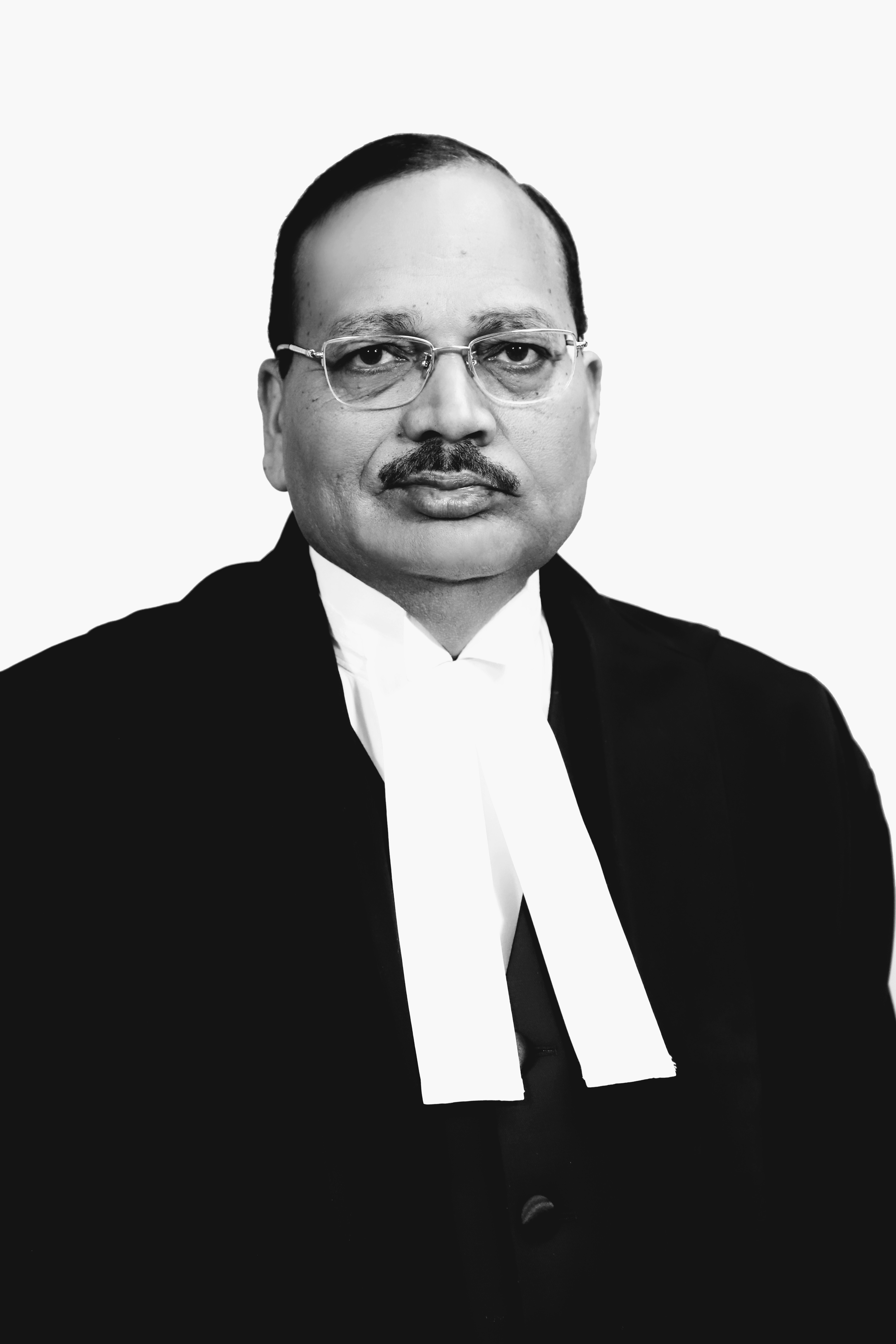
- Top left: H. J. Kania was the first Chief Justice of India.
- Top centre: M. Patanjali Sastri was the first Chief Justice elevated from South India.
- Top right: Y. V. Chandrachud was the longest serving Chief Justice (seven years).
- Bottom left: Kamal Narain Singh was the shortest serving Chief Justice (seventeen days).
- Bottom centre: E. S. Venkataramiah was the first Chief Justice elevated from Karnataka.
- Bottom right: Surya Kant is the present Chief Justice.

Key
†	Died in office
‡	Resigned

No.	Image	Name (birth–death)	Start of Term	End of Term	Length of Term	Parent High Court	Appointed by (President of India)	Ref.
1	Harilal Jekisundas Kania	Harilal Jekisundas Kania (1890–1951)	26 January 1950	6 November 1951^{†}	1 year, 284 days	Bombay	Rajendra Prasad	
2	Mandakolathur Patanjali Sastri	Mandakolathur Patanjali Sastri (1889–1963)	7 November 1951	3 January 1954	2 years, 57 days	Madras	Rajendra Prasad	
3	Mehr Chand Mahajan	Mehr Chand Mahajan (1889–1967)	4 January 1954	22 December 1954	352 days	Lahore	Rajendra Prasad	
4	Bijan Kumar Mukherjea	Bijan Kumar Mukherjea (1891–1956)	23 December 1954	31 January 1956^{‡}	1 year, 39 days	Calcutta	Rajendra Prasad	
5	Sudhi Ranjan Das	Sudhi Ranjan Das (1894–1977)	1 February 1956	30 September 1959	3 years, 241 days	Calcutta	Rajendra Prasad	
6	Bhuvaneshwar Prasad Sinha	Bhuvaneshwar Prasad Sinha (1899–1986)	1 October 1959	31 January 1964	4 years, 122 days	Patna	Rajendra Prasad	
7	Pralhad Balacharya Gajendragadkar	Pralhad Balacharya Gajendragadkar (1901–1981)	1 February 1964	15 March 1966	2 years, 42 days	Bombay	Sarvepalli Radhakrishnan	
8	Amal Kumar Sarkar	Amal Kumar Sarkar (1901–2001)	16 March 1966	29 June 1966	105 days	Calcutta	Sarvepalli Radhakrishnan	
9	Koka Subba Rao	Koka Subba Rao (1902–1976)	30 June 1966	11 April 1967^{‡}	285 days	Madras	Sarvepalli Radhakrishnan	
10	Kailas Nath Wanchoo	Kailas Nath Wanchoo (1903–1988)	12 April 1967	24 February 1968	318 days	Allahabad	Sarvepalli Radhakrishnan	
11	Mohammad Hidayatullah	Mohammad Hidayatullah (1905–1992) (Note: Also served as acting President of India and Vice President of India)	25 February 1968	16 December 1970	2 years, 294 days	Nagpur	Zakir Hussain	
12	Jayantilal Chhotalal Shah	Jayantilal Chhotalal Shah (1906–1991)	17 December 1970	21 January 1971	35 days	Bombay	V. V. Giri	
13	Sarv Mittra Sikri	Sarv Mittra Sikri (1908–1992)	22 January 1971	25 April 1973	2 years, 93 days	Bar Council	V. V. Giri	
14	Ajit Nath Ray	Ajit Nath Ray (1912–2009)	26 April 1973	28 January 1977	3 years, 276 days	Calcutta	V. V. Giri	
15	Mirza Hameedullah Beg	Mirza Hameedullah Beg (1913–1988)	29 January 1977	21 February 1978	1 year, 24 days	Allahabad	Fakhruddin Ali Ahmed	
16	Yeshwant Vishnu Chandrachud	Yeshwant Vishnu Chandrachud (1920–2008)	22 February 1978	11 July 1985	7 years, 139 days	Bombay	Neelam Sanjiva Reddy	
17	Prafullachandra Natwarlal Bhagwati	Prafullachandra Natwarlal Bhagwati (1921–2017)	12 July 1985	20 December 1986	1 year, 161 days	Gujarat	Zail Singh	
18	Raghunandan Swarup Pathak	Raghunandan Swarup Pathak (1924–2007)	21 December 1986	18 June 1989^{‡}	2 years, 209 days	Allahabad	Zail Singh	
19	E. S. Venkataramiah	Engalaguppe Seetharamiah Venkataramiah (1924–1997)	19 June 1989	17 December 1989	181 days	Karnataka	Ramaswamy Venkataraman	
20	Sabyasachi Mukharji	Sabyasachi Mukharji (1927–1990)	18 December 1989	25 September 1990^{†}	281 days	Calcutta	Ramaswamy Venkataraman	
21	Ranganath Misra	Ranganath Misra (1926–2012)	26 September 1990	24 November 1991	1 year, 59 days	Orissa	Ramaswamy Venkataraman	
22	Kamal Narain Singh	Kamal Narain Singh (1926–2022)	25 November 1991	12 December 1991	17 days	Allahabad	Ramaswamy Venkataraman	
23	Madhukar Hiralal Kania	Madhukar Hiralal Kania (1927–2016)	13 December 1991	17 November 1992	340 days	Bombay	Ramaswamy Venkataraman	
24	Lalit Mohan Sharma	Lalit Mohan Sharma (1928–2008)	18 November 1992	11 February 1993	85 days	Patna	Shankar Dayal Sharma	
25	M. N. Venkatachaliah	Manepalli Narayanarao Venkatachaliah (born 1929)	12 February 1993	24 October 1994	1 year, 254 days	Karnataka	Shankar Dayal Sharma	
26	Aziz Mushabber Ahmadi	Aziz Mushabber Ahmadi (1932–2023)	25 October 1994	24 March 1997	2 years, 150 days	Gujarat	Shankar Dayal Sharma	
27	Jagdish Sharan Verma	Jagdish Sharan Verma (1933–2013)	25 March 1997	17 January 1998	298 days	Madhya Pradesh	Shankar Dayal Sharma	
28	Madan Mohan Punchhi	Madan Mohan Punchhi (1933–2015)	18 January 1998	9 October 1998	264 days	Punjab and Haryana	K. R. Narayanan	
29	Adarsh Sein Anand	Adarsh Sein Anand (1936–2017)	10 October 1998	31 October 2001	3 years, 21 days	Jammu and Kashmir	K. R. Narayanan	
30	Sam Piroj Bharucha	Sam Piroj Bharucha (born 1937)	1 November 2001	5 May 2002	185 days	Bombay	K. R. Narayanan	
31	Bhupinder Nath Kirpal	Bhupinder Nath Kirpal (born 1937)	6 May 2002	7 November 2002	185 days	Delhi	K. R. Narayanan	
32	Gopal Ballav Pattanaik	Gopal Ballav Pattanaik (born 1937)	8 November 2002	18 December 2002	40 days	Orissa	A. P. J. Abdul Kalam	
33	Vishweshwar Nath Khare	Vishweshwar Nath Khare (born 1939)	19 December 2002	1 May 2004	1 year, 134 days	Allahabad	A. P. J. Abdul Kalam	
34	S. Rajendra Babu	Sanjeevalu Rajendra Babu (born 1939)	2 May 2004	31 May 2004	29 days	Karnataka	A. P. J. Abdul Kalam	
35	Ramesh Chandra Lahoti	Ramesh Chandra Lahoti (1940–2022)	1 June 2004	31 October 2005	1 year, 152 days	Madhya Pradesh	A. P. J. Abdul Kalam	
36	Yogesh Kumar Sabharwal	Yogesh Kumar Sabharwal (1942–2015)	1 November 2005	13 January 2007	1 year, 73 days	Delhi	A. P. J. Abdul Kalam	
37	Konakuppakatil Gopinathan Balakrishnan	Konakuppakatil Gopinathan Balakrishnan (born 1945)	14 January 2007	11 May 2010	3 years, 117 days	Kerala	A. P. J. Abdul Kalam	
38	Sarosh Homi Kapadia	Sarosh Homi Kapadia (1947–2016)	12 May 2010	28 September 2012	2 years, 139 days	Bombay	Pratibha Patil	
39	Altamas Kabir	Altamas Kabir (1948–2017)	29 September 2012	18 July 2013	292 days	Calcutta	Pranab Mukherjee	
40	Palanisamy Sathasivam	Palanisamy Sathasivam (born 1949)	19 July 2013	26 April 2014	281 days	Madras	Pranab Mukherjee	
41	Rajendra Mal Lodha	Rajendra Mal Lodha (born 1949)	27 April 2014	27 September 2014	153 days	Rajasthan	Pranab Mukherjee	
42	Handyala Lakshminarayanaswamy Dattu	Handyala Lakshminarayanaswamy Dattu (born 1950)	28 September 2014	2 December 2015	1 year, 65 days	Karnataka	Pranab Mukherjee	
43	Tirath Singh Thakur	Tirath Singh Thakur (born 1952)	3 December 2015	3 January 2017	1 year, 31 days	Jammu and Kashmir	Pranab Mukherjee	
44	Jagdish Singh Khehar	Jagdish Singh Khehar (born 1952)	4 January 2017	27 August 2017	235 days	Punjab and Haryana	Pranab Mukherjee	
45	Dipak Misra	Dipak Misra (born 1953)	28 August 2017	2 October 2018	1 year, 35 days	Orissa	Ram Nath Kovind	
46	Ranjan Gogoi	Ranjan Gogoi (born 1954)	3 October 2018	17 November 2019	1 year, 45 days	Gauhati	Ram Nath Kovind	
47	Sharad Arvind Bobde	Sharad Arvind Bobde (born 1956)	18 November 2019	23 April 2021	1 year, 156 days	Bombay	Ram Nath Kovind	
48	Nuthalapati Venkata Ramana	Nuthalapati Venkata Ramana (born 1957)	24 April 2021	26 August 2022	1 year, 124 days	Andhra Pradesh	Ram Nath Kovind	
49	Uday Umesh Lalit	Uday Umesh Lalit (born 1957)	27 August 2022	8 November 2022	73 days	Bar Council	Droupadi Murmu	
50	Dhananjaya Yeshwant Chandrachud	Dhananjaya Yeshwant Chandrachud (born 1959)	9 November 2022	10 November 2024	2 years, 1 day	Bombay	Droupadi Murmu	
51	Sanjiv Khanna	Sanjiv Khanna (born 1960)	11 November 2024	13 May 2025	183 days	Delhi	Droupadi Murmu	
52	Bhushan Ramkrishna Gavai	Bhushan Ramkrishna Gavai (born 1960)	14 May 2025	23 November 2025	193 days	Bombay	Droupadi Murmu	
53	Surya Kant	Surya Kant (born 1962)	24 November 2025	Incumbent	120 days	Punjab and Haryana	Droupadi Murmu	

== See also ==
- List of current Indian chief justices
- List of female chief justices in India
- List of sitting judges of the Supreme Court of India
- List of former judges of the Supreme Court of India
- List of female judges of the Supreme Court of India
