= List of female judges of the Supreme Court of India =

List of Women Judges of India

Emblem of the Supreme Court of India

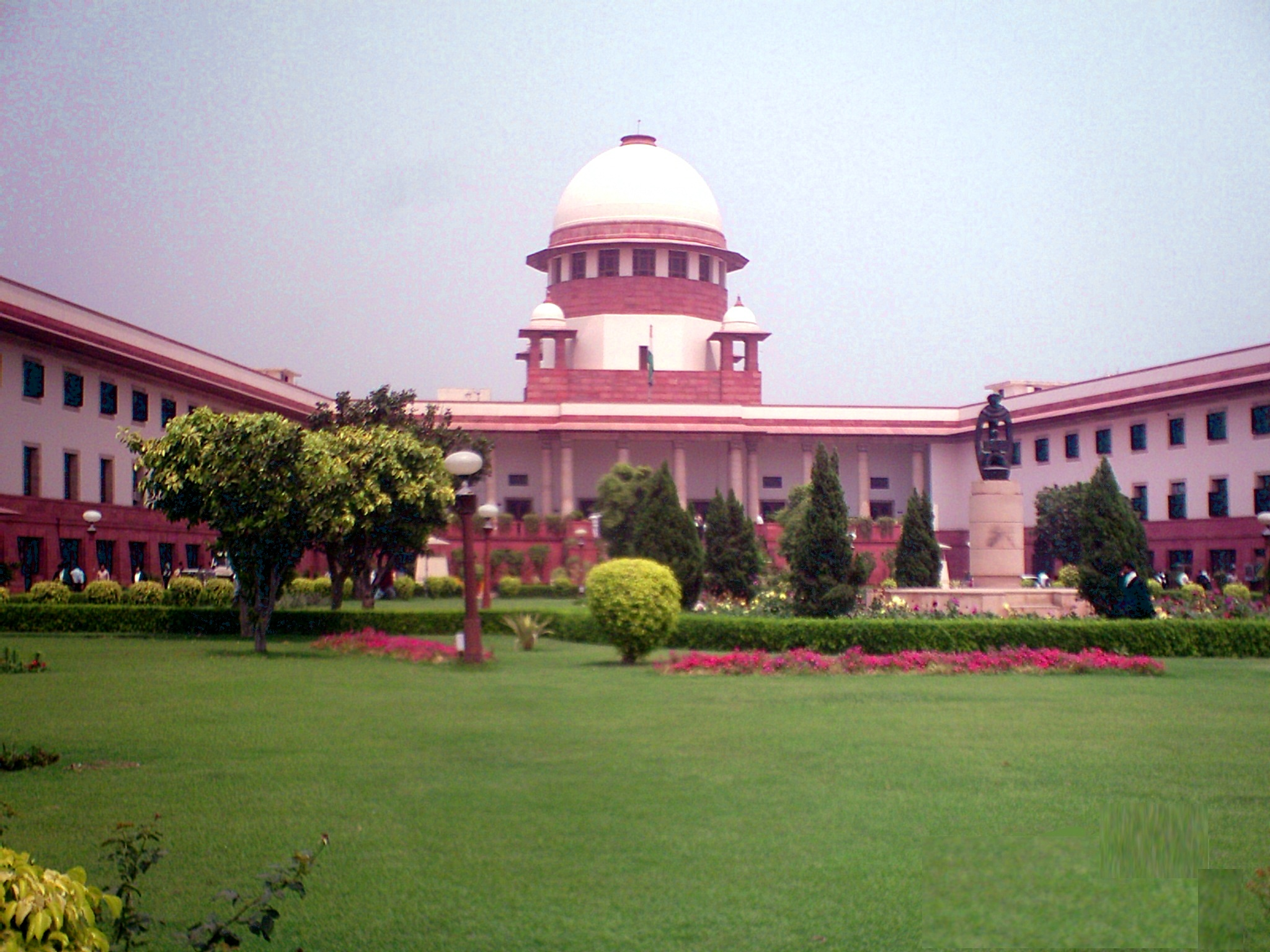
The Supreme Court of India, in New Delhi

This is a list of women judges of the Supreme Court of India, the highest court in the Republic of India. The list is arranged in chronological order.

The first woman to become a judge of the Supreme Court was Fathima Beevi, appointed on 6 October 1989. There have been 11 women justices in the court since then. Currently, there are just two sitting women judges out of the total 38 – Justices B. V. Nagarathna and V. Mohana. Justice Nagarathna is also set to be the first female Chief Justice of India in September 2027, with a tenure of just 36 days, the third shortest in history.

== List of Judges in chronology ==
Key

Incumbent

No.	Portrait	Name	Date of appointment	Date of retirement	Tenure	Immediate prior post before elevation to Supreme Court	Notes
1		Fathima Beevi	6 October 1989	29 April 1992	2 years, 206 days	Judge of the Kerala High Court	First female judge of the Supreme Court of India
2		Sujata Manohar	8 November 1994	27 August 1999	4 years, 292 days	Chief Justice of the Kerala High Court	
3		Ruma Pal	28 January 2000	2 June 2006	6 years, 125 days	Judge of the Calcutta High Court	Longest-serving female judge of the Supreme Court of India
4		Gyan Sudha Misra	30 April 2010	27 April 2014	3 years, 362 days	Chief Justice of the Jharkhand High Court	
5		Ranjana Desai	13 September 2011	29 October 2014	3 years, 46 days	Judge of the Bombay High Court	
6		R. Banumathi	13 August 2014	19 July 2020	5 years, 341 days	Chief Justice of the Jharkhand High Court	
7		Indu Malhotra	27 April 2018	13 March 2021	2 years, 320 days	Member of the High Level Committee in the Ministry of Law and Justice	First woman judge who was elevated directly from the Bar Council of India
8		Indira Banerjee	7 August 2018	23 September 2022	4 years, 47 days	Chief Justice of the Madras High Court	
9		Hima Kohli	31 August 2021	1 September 2024	3 years, 1 day	Chief Justice of the Telangana High Court	
10		Bela Trivedi	31 August 2021	9 June 2025	3 years, 282 days	Judge of the Gujarat High Court	
11		B. V. Nagarathna	31 August 2021	29 October 2027	6 years, 59 days	Judge of the Karnataka High Court	Assumed to be the first female Chief Justice of India in 2027.
12		V. Mohana	2 June 2026	26 June 2031	5 years, 24 days	Senior Advocate in the Supreme Court	Second woman judge who was elevated directly from the Bar Council of India
13		Sunita Agarwal	6 October 2026	29 April 2031	4 years, 205 days	Chief Justice of the Gujarat High Court	

== See also ==
- List of female governors in India
- List of female lieutenant governors and administrators in India
- List of female chief ministers in India
- List of female deputy chief ministers in India
- List of female legislative speakers and chairpersons in India
- List of female opposition leaders in India
- List of female chief justices in India
- List of chief justices of India
- List of sitting judges of the Supreme Court of India
- List of former judges of the Supreme Court of India
- List of first women lawyers and judges in Asia
