= ILS Law College =

Law college in Pune, India

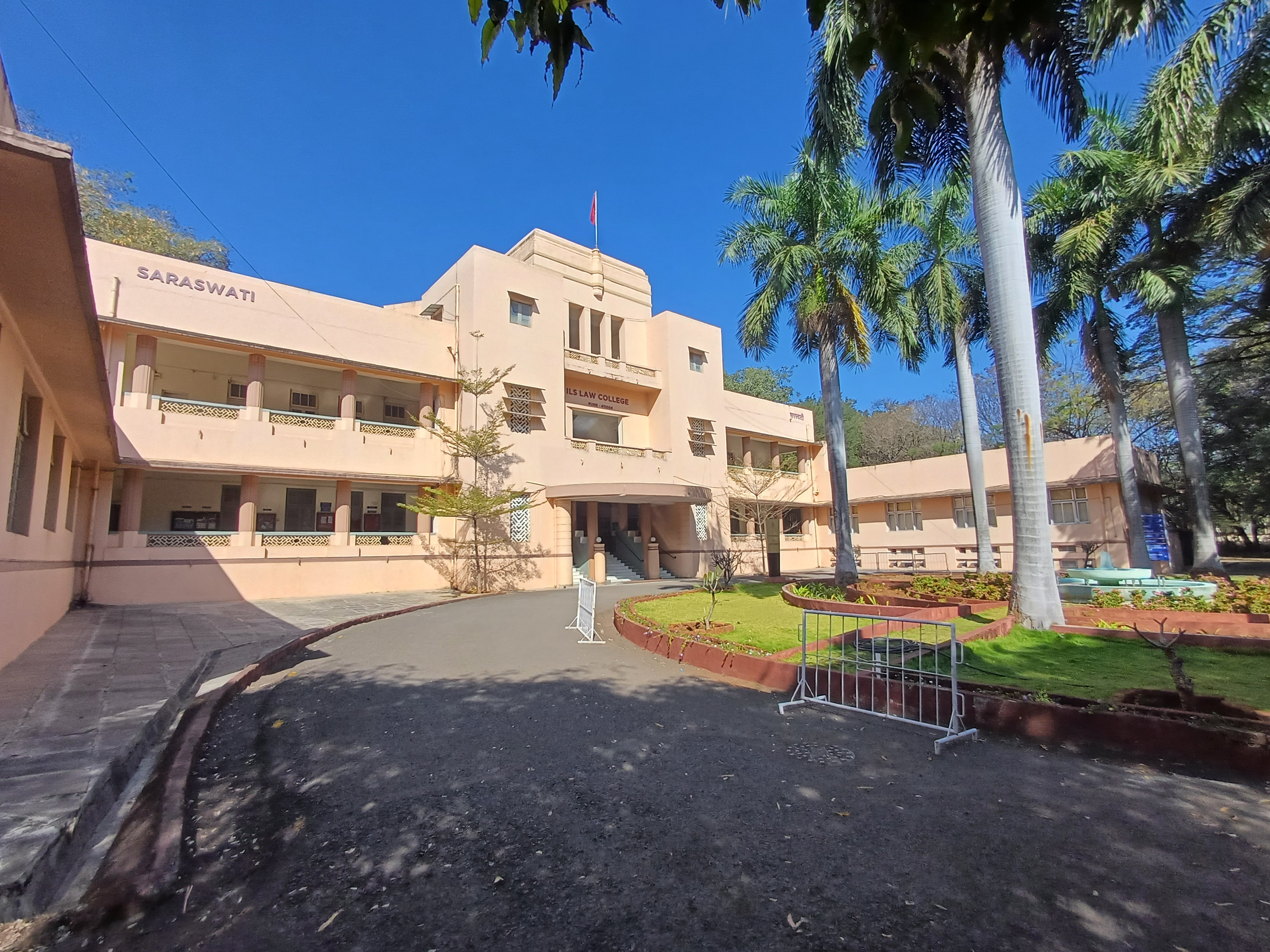
- ILS Law College in 2024
- Type: Government aided Law College
- Established: 20 June 1924; 101 years ago
- Affiliations: Savitribai Phule Pune University
- Principal: Deepa Jitendra Paturkar
- Location: Pune, Maharashtra, India; 18.517204°N 73.828393°E
- Campus: 154 acres; Urban
- Website: www.ilslaw.edu

ILS Law College, or in its full name Indian Law Society's Law College, is a government-aided law school in Pune, India. ILS is located on Law College Road, Pune. The college was aided by the Ford Foundation.

== History ==
The Indian Law Society was established on 4 March 1923 as a Public Charitable Trust registered under the Societies Registration Act. The society established the eponymous Law College with the objective of providing facilities for the study of law on a scientific basis with proper training.

The college was affiliated with the University of Bombay, but with the founding of the Savitribai Phule Pune University in 1948, the college became affiliated to it.

== Campus ==
The ILS campus is located at the centre of Law College Road between the FTII (Film and Television Institute) and the Bhandarkar Research Institute. The Sarswati Building houses the library, the reading room, the administrative office, the conference hall and the Principal's office, besides the chambers of other faculty members and computer facilities for research students. The Lakshmi Building has eighteen halls for regular lectures, the legal aid centre and an auditorium with a capacity of 400 people, used for guest lectures, college functions and presentations.

Apart from the academic and administrative buildings, the College facilities are further enriched with a huge residential complex for male students; the newly constructed Ladies Hostel, a gymnasium, a cricket and football ground, a sports pavilion housing the indoor sports facilities, tennis courts and a swimming pool to maintain physical health.

Housed on a floor of the Sarswati building, the ILS library includes over 45,000 books and volumes of periodicals, journals and magazines. It subscribes to over 95 Indian and foreign journals each year, including the All England Reports, The American Journal of Comparative Law, and The Cambridge and Oxford Law Journals. It offers computer and photocopying facilities to its students as well as an online search catalog. The library has an inter-library loan network with other libraries in Pune.

== Academics ==
=== Academic programmes ===
In addition to the five-year degree course and the three-year degree course (for graduates in any discipline), the college offers diplomas and distance-learning courses.

ILS is part of the EU Law Poros Programme, and students can apply for this diploma course. The best students from the programme get a chance to go on an exchange program to Greece for a semester of study there.

=== Rankings ===
University rankings

Law – India
- India Today (2022): 10

ILS Law College was ranked tenth by India Today's "India's Best Colleges 2022: Law", ninth in 2023 and eleventh in 2024.

== Student life ==
The college devotes attention to creating a Moot Court atmosphere; ILS has debating cells, cultural cells, a corporate cell, a center for public law, an alternate dispute resolution cell, Intellectual Property Rights Cell, International Law Cell, Hariyali cell etc.

The college has a legal aid programme involving final year students, and runs legal literacy programmes for lay people. For instance, in a project with the KEM Hospital research centre, a village is selected and students sent there to spread legal literacy. This project covers issues like human rights, gender and civil rights. Students also put on street plays to make citizens aware of legal issues.

In conjunction with the Rotary circuit, ILS students go to a legal centre four days a week. The centre gets clients through various NGOs active in Pune. The legal centre also has lawyers on hand to help people in need of counselling. However, the college advocates out-of-court settlements to lengthy litigation.

One of the institution's projects involves working with the National Commission for Women. The college is active in human rights projects which are handled by the student members Human Rights Cell of the college.

The institution has been a partner institute for Surana & Surana International Technology Law Moot Court Competition from 2002 to 2008.

== Notable alumni ==
- Yashwantrao Chavan, former deputy PM of India, First Chief Minister of Maharashtra
- Vilasrao Deshmukh, two time Chief Minister of Maharashtra and a former Union Minister
- Gopinathrao Munde, (Introduced MCOCA), former deputy Chief Minister of State of Maharashtra, Union Minister and Central Cabinet Minister.
- B. G. Kolse Patil, Former Bombay High Court Judge
- Sushil Kumar Shinde, Home Minister and former Chief Minister of Maharashtra.
- Yeshwant Vishnu Chandrachud, former Chief Justice of India
- E S Venkataramiah, 19th Chief Justice of India
- P. B. Gajendragadkar, 7th Chief Justice of India, serving from February 1964 to March 1966.
- A S Chandurkar, Judge Supreme Court of India
- Mohan Dharia (b. 1925), Padma Vibhushan, former Union Minister, social worker
- Prabha Atre Classical vocalist, Padma Shri, Padma Bhushan, Padma Vibhushan.
- Balasaheb Thorat, Minister for revenue in Maharashtra state
- Rajiv Satav, Member of Rajyasabha, Former Member of Loksabha
- Muhammed Hamdulla Sayeed, youngest Congress MP in India elected from the Lakshadweep Constituency
- Kona Prabhakara Rao, Governor of Sikkim
- Devesh Chandra Thakur, Member of Parliament in 18th Lok Sabha representing Sitamarhi Lok Sabha constituency, Former Chairman and Member of Bihar Legislative Council from Tirhut graduate constituency and Former Cabinet Minister of Bihar.
- Ramrao Adik, former Deputy Chief Minister of Maharashtra
- K. Hanumanthaiah, Second Chief Minister of Karnataka
- S. Nijalingappa, Fourth Chief Minister of Karnataka
- T. Madiah Gowda, Member of first Lok Sabha
- Vandana Chavan, Member of Rajya Sabha & former mayor of Pune
- Shankarrao Bajirao Patil, Politician
- Panchi Bora, TV actress
- Rahul Kul, Maharashtra Legislative Assembly representing Daund Assembly constituency in Pune District
- Ashok Chhotelal Agarwal, Former Chief Justice of Madras High Court
