= Petwar =

- Village
- Location within Haryana Location within India
- Coordinates: 29°10′20″N 76°09′49″E
- Country: India
- State: Haryana
- District: Hisar
- Subdistrict: Hansi
- Time zone: UTC+05:30 (IST)

Petwar is a village located in the Narnaund Tehsil of the Hisar District of Haryana, India.

== Notable people ==
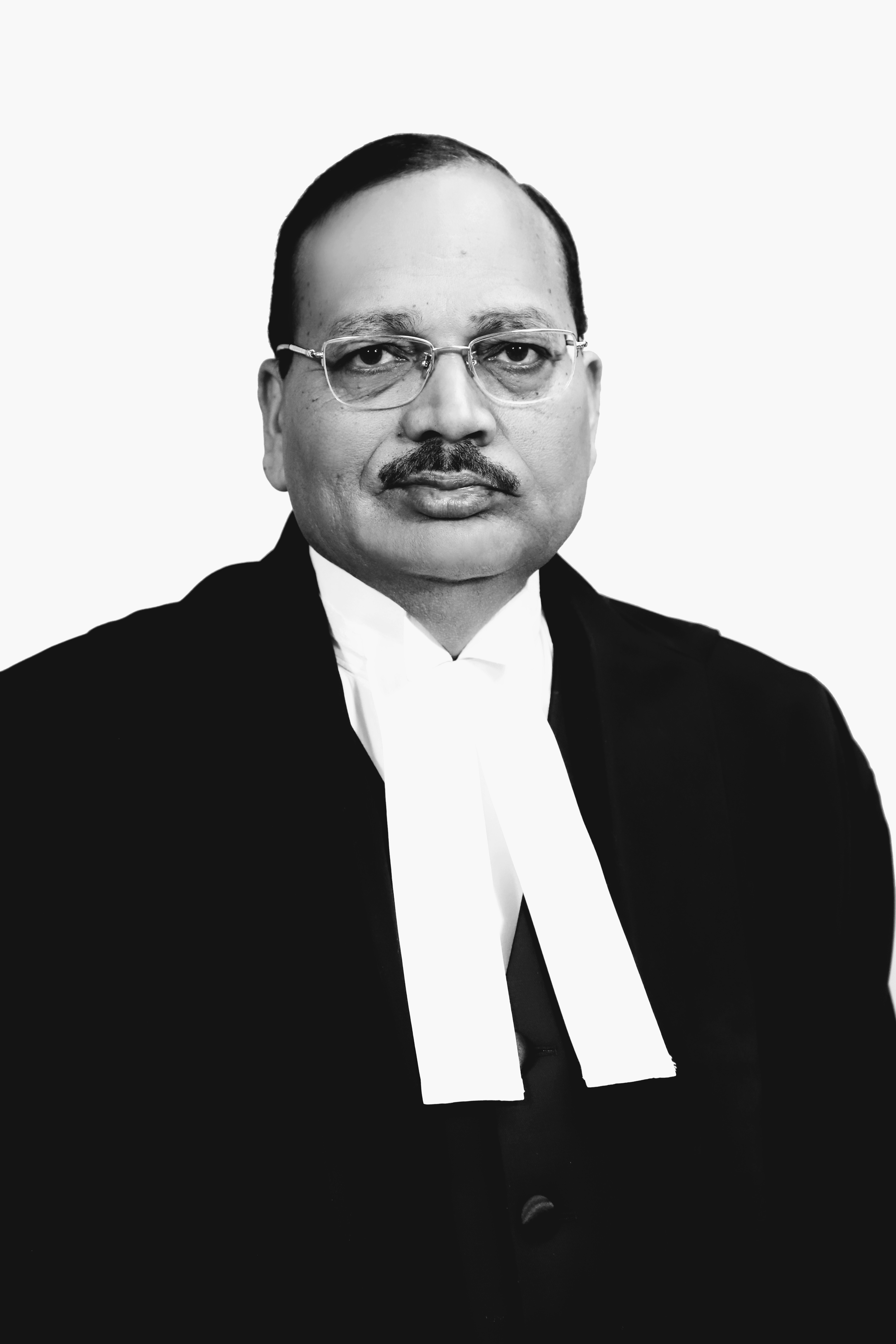
Surya Kant, native of Petwar and Chief Justice of India

- Surya Kant, the 53rd Chief Justice of India, was born and raised in Petwar village.
