= Vipul Pancholi =

Judge of the Supreme Court of India

Hon'ble Justice Vipul Manubhai Pancholi
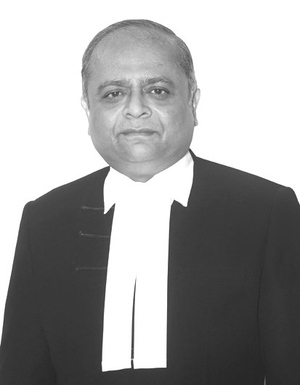
- Official portrait

Judge of Supreme Court of India
- Incumbent
- Assumed office 29 August 2025
- Nominated by: B. R. Gavai
- Appointed by: Droupadi Murmu

45th Chief Justice of Patna High Court
- In office 21 July 2025 – 28 August 2025
- Nominated by: B. R. Gavai
- Appointed by: Droupadi Murmu
- Preceded by: K. Vinod Chandran; Ashutosh Kumar (acting)
- Succeeded by: P. B. Bajanthri

Judge of Patna High Court
- In office 24 July 2023 – 20 July 2025
- Nominated by: U. U. Lalit
- Appointed by: Droupadi Murmu

Judge of Gujarat High Court
- In office 1 October 2014 – 23 July 2023
- Nominated by: R. M. Lodha
- Appointed by: Pranab Mukherjee

Personal details
- Born: 28 May 1968 (age 58) Ahmedabad
- Education: B.Sc, L.L.M
- Alma mater: St. Xavier's College, Ahmedabad, L.A. Shah Law College,Gujarat University

Vipul Manubhai Pancholi (born 28 May 1968) is a judge of the Supreme Court of India. He is a former Chief Justice of Patna High Court, and had also served as judge of the same high court, as well as of Gujarat High Court.

== Early life ==
Vipul M. Pancholi was born on 28 May 1968, in Ahmedabad, Gujarat. He did his B.Sc. degree in Electronics from St. Xavier's College, Ahmedabad. He then completed the LL.M. degree in Commercial Group at Sir L.A. Shah Law College, Ahmedabad.

== Career ==
He passed the bar in September 1991 and practiced as an advocate in Gujarat High Court. He served as Assistant Government Pleader and Additional Public Prosecutor at Gujarat High Court from 1999-2006. He worked as visiting faculty at Sir L.A. Shah Law College, Ahmedabad from 1993-2014. He conducted cases in branches of law including Criminal Law, Civil Law, Property Law, Service Law, Family Law, and Banking Law.

On 1 October 2014 he was elevated as an Additional Judge and confirmed as permanent Judge on 10 June 2016. He transferred to Patna High Court on 24 July 2023.

He was appointed as chief justice of Patna High Court and took oath as chief justice on 21 July 2025.

On 25 August 2025 Supreme court collegium led by CJI B. R. Gavai recommended him to be appointed as judge of Supreme Court of India along with Bombay High Court chief justice Alok Aradhe and this was cleared by central government on 27 August 2025. He would be in line to become 60th Chief Justice of India and would serve tenure of nearly 1.5 years if seniority convention is followed.

== Controversy ==
Justice Pancholi's elevation to the Supreme Court has been subject to significant controversy, with Justice Nagaratna issuing a rare detailed dissent against the 4:1 majority collegium decision. Justice Nagarathna stated that his appointment would be "counter-productive" to the administration of justice and would place at risk "whatever credibility the collegium system still holds." Central to her concerns were the circumstances surrounding Justice Pancholi's July 2023 transfer from Gujarat High Court to Patna High Court, which she noted was "not a routine move but followed due deliberation at the highest levels," urging examination of confidential minutes that suggested irregularities. The controversy first emerged in May 2025 when his elevation was initially shelved due to objections, with Justice Nagarathna expressing surprise when his name re-emerged within three months.

Justice Nagarathna's dissent highlighted Justice Pancholi's low seniority (57th in the all-India list) and the bypassing of "several meritorious and more senior judges." She flagged representation concerns, noting that Gujarat High Court would have three judges on the Supreme Court, which would "skew the balance when many high courts remain unrepresented." She also expressed concerns about his potential Chief Justice tenure from October 2031 to May 2033, stating that outcome "would not be in the institution's interest."

The controversy has been compounded by transparency and gender representation issues. The Campaign for Judicial Accountability and Reforms criticized the collegium's departure from previous transparency standards, calling the current process "a retrogression in transparency." Justice Nagarathna's request to publish her dissent has not been fulfilled. The appointment occurs amid poor gender representation, with Justice Nagarathna remaining the sole woman judge after Justice Bela M. Trivedi's retirement in June 2025. The last woman judge appointed to the Supreme Court was in 2021 under then CJI N.V. Ramana's collegium, and since then Chief Justices U.U. Lalit, D.Y. Chandrachud, Sanjiv Khanna, and B.R. Gavai have failed to appoint any woman judge to the Supreme Court.
