= A. S. Chandurkar =

Indian Supreme Court judge (born 1965)

Atul Sharachchandra Chandurkar
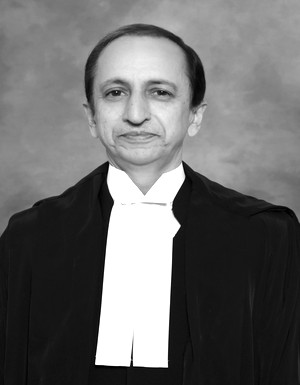
- Official Portrait 2025

Judge of the Supreme Court of India
- Incumbent
- Assumed office 30 May 2025
- Nominated by: Bhushan Ramkrishna Gavai
- Appointed by: Droupadi Murmu

Judge of Bombay High Court
- In office 21 June 2013 – 29 May 2025
- Nominated by: Altamas Kabir
- Appointed by: Pranab Mukherjee

Personal details
- Born: 7 April 1965 (age 61)
- Education: B.Com, L.L.B
- Alma mater: ILS Law College; University of Pune

Atul Sharachchandra Chandurkar (born 7 April 1965) is an Indian jurist who is currently serving as a judge of the Supreme Court of India. Atul Sharadchandra Chandurkar is 3rd Chancellor of Maharashtra National Law University, Nagpur. He is a former judge of Bombay High Court.

== Early life and career ==
Justice Chandurkar was born on 7 April 1965. He completed his schooling from St. Vincents' High School at Pune. He did his graduation from Ness Wadia College at Pune and obtained his L.L.B from I. L. S. Law College in Pune. He joined the Bar on 21 July 1988 and commenced practise in the Chambers of Senior Advocate Shri B. N. Naik in Mumbai who later elevated as Judge. He shifted to Nagpur in 1992. He started practising in various Courts and handled matters of various nature.

He has also authored two books on "The Maharashtra Municipal Council Nagar Panchayats & Industrial Townships Act, 1965 and The Maharashtra Rent Control Act, 1999.

He was elevated as Additional Judge of the Bombay High Court on 21 June 2013 and was confirmed as permanent judge on 2 March 2016.

On 26 May 2025, Supreme court collegium led by CJI Bhushan Ramkrishna Gavai recommended him to be appointed as Judge of Supreme Court of India. This was cleared by central government on 29 May 2025 and he took the oath as a judge of Supreme court of India on 30 May 2025.
