= Raghunandan Swarup Pathak =

18th Chief Justice of India

Raghunandan Pathak
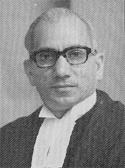

Judge of International Court of Justice
- In office 1989–1991

18th Chief Justice of India
- In office 21 December 1986 – 18 June 1989
- Appointed by: Giani Zail Singh
- Preceded by: P. N. Bhagwati
- Succeeded by: E.S. Venkataramiah

Judge of Supreme Court of India
- In office 20 February 1978 – 20 December 1986
- Nominated by: Mirza Hameedullah Beg
- Appointed by: Neelam Sanjiva Reddy

2nd Chief Justice of Himachal Pradesh High Court
- In office 18 March 1972 – 19 February 1978
- Nominated by: Sarv Mittra Sikri
- Appointed by: V. V. Giri
- Preceded by: M. H. Beg; Dhruva Bihari Lal (acting)
- Succeeded by: Tryambaklal Umedchand Mehta

Judge of Allahabad High Court
- In office 1 October 1962 – 17 March 1972
- Nominated by: B. P. Sinha
- Appointed by: S. Radhakrishnan

Personal details
- Born: 25 November 1924
- Died: 17 November 2007 (aged 82) New Delhi, India
- Parent: Gopal Swarup Pathak

Raghunandan Swarup Pathak (25 November 1924 – 17 November 2007) was an Indian judge, who served as the 18th Chief Justice of India. He was the son of Gopal Swarup Pathak, a former Vice President of India.

He was one of the four judges from India to have been on the International Court of Justice in The Hague (the others being Benegal Narsing Rau who served at the ICJ in 1952 -1953, Nagendra Singh who served as its President from 1985 to 1988 and former Supreme Court justice Dalveer Bhandari, who currently sits upon the World Court). He did his schooling from St. Joseph's College, Allahabad and had studied law at Allahabad University. After practising law at Allahabad, he became Judge at Allahabad High Court in 1962 and later Chief Justice of Himachal Pradesh High Court in 1972.

== At the Supreme Court of India ==
Pathak was made a judge at Supreme Court of India in 1978 and became its 18th Chief Justice on 21 December 1986. He is remembered as a judge who was a man of the middle and was able to bring relative peace to the Court. He served as Chief justice for two and a half years during which time a dozen judges were appointed to the Court. Five of them — Madhukar Hiralal Kania, Lalit Mohan Sharma, Manepalle Narayana Rao Venkatachaliah, Aziz Mushabber Ahmadi, and Jagdish Sharan Verma— went on to serve as Chief Justices between 1991 and 1998.

Over the course of his tenure on the Supreme Court, Pathak authored 267 judgments and sat on 812 benches.

By being Chief Justice of India, he also administered oath of office to 8th President of India Ramaswamy Venkataraman.

== Bhopal gas disaster ==
Pathak facilitated an out of court settlement between Union Carbide Corporation and the Government of India in 1989 regarding the compensation to be paid for the Bhopal gas tragedy. The government had sought $3.3 billion but received only $470 million and the settlement resulted in the dropping of criminal liability charges against Union Carbide in the case. Within three months of his retirement Pathak became a member of the International Court of Justice at The Hague. The Supreme Court in 1991 upheld the settlement in 1991 thus ending Union Carbide's liability in the case.

== Judge of the International Court of Justice ==
Pathak was elected a judge of the International Court of Justice and served in that position from 1989 to 1991. He was elected in "casual election" that was held following the death of M. Nagendra Singh, an Indian judge who was then serving his second term at the International Court. In 1991 India decided not to renominate Pathak, who however entered the fray with the backing of Ireland. After the Irish government came under attack in the Dáil from MPs who blamed Pathak for approving, as Chief Justice of India, the $470-million Bhopal gas disaster settlement with Union Carbide, Pathak withdrew from the race.

== Oil-for-Food Programme inquiry ==
In November 2005, Justice Pathak was appointed to inquire into alleged Indian links in the Oil-for-Food Programme. On 3 August 2006, he submitted his 90-page report which indicted suspended Congress leader and former External Affairs Minister K. Natwar Singh.

== Death ==
Pathak died on 17 November 2007, at the age of 82 following a heart attack in New Delhi. His death occurred a week before his 83rd birthday.

Legal offices
Preceded by Prafullachandra Natwarlal Bhagwati	Chief Justice of India; 21 December 1986– 6 June 1989	Succeeded by Engalaguppe Seetharamiah Venkataramiah
