= M. M. Sundresh =

Indian judge (born 1962)

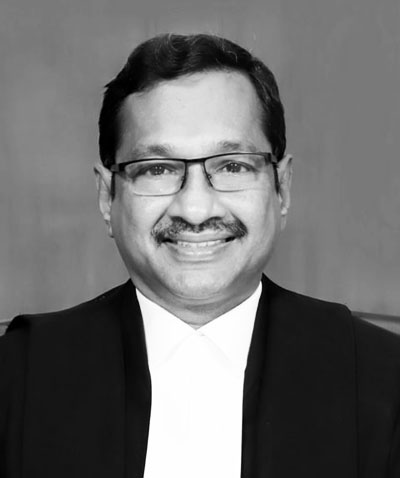

Judge of the Supreme Court of India
- Incumbent
- Assumed office 31 August 2021
- Nominated by: N. V. Ramana
- Appointed by: Ram Nath Kovind

Judge of the Madras High Court
- In office 31 March 2009 – 30 August 2021
- Nominated by: K. G. Balakrishnan
- Appointed by: Pratibha Patil

Personal details
- Born: M. M. Sundresh; 21 July 1962 (age 64) Erode, Tamil Nadu, India
- Parent: Advocate Mr. V K Muthusamy
- Education: Loyola College, Madras Law College

M. M. Sundresh (born 21 July 1962) is a judge of the Supreme Court of India. He previously served as a judge of the Madras High Court.

== Early life ==
M. M. Sudresh was born in Erode on 21 July 1962. Sundresh completed his schooling and P.U.C (Pre University Course) at Erode. He obtained a Bachelor of Arts in History degree from Loyola College, Chennai. Sundresh received a law degree from the Madras Law College.

== Advocate ==
Sundresh registered his name in the roll of advocates, in 1985 in the Bar Council of Tamil Nadu and Puducherry. The Government of Tamil Nadu appointed Sundresh as the counsel for the state government. He was working as government advocate from 1991 to 1996. Sundresh appeared for the TNSSIDC (Corporation for the Development of Small Scale Industries) and practiced on all the fields of law at Madras High Court. He joined the chamber of S. Sivasubramaniam. He also joined the chamber of his father V. K. Muthusamy. He was selected to the RO System Monitoring Committee to watch the erection of ROS (Reverse Osmosis System) in Thiruppur District, Karur District and Erode District.

== Judicial career ==
Sundresh was elevated to the Madras High Court from the bar, on 31 March 2009. On 29 March 2011, his appointment was made permanent.

Sundresh had participated in the inaugural function of the new building for Mediation and Conciliation, Lok Adalat and Arbitration Center at the Madras High Court premises, in the presence of the other administrative judges and judicial officers. He was elevated as a judge of the Supreme Court of India on 26 August 2021 and took his oath on 31 August 2021.

== Notable cases ==
=== Elephant poaching case ===
A division bench of Justices Sundresh and N. Sathish Kumar had ordered a Central Bureau of Investigation probe into a series of elephant poaching incidents reported in the State. They also observed the network involved was cutting across boundaries. The court order was passed on the basis of the report submitted by the Wildlife Crime Control Bureau, which carried out an extensive study in this regard.

=== Netaji's photo in currency note case ===
Justices Sundresh and S Ananthi of the Madras High Court has asked the central government to consider having Netaji Subhash Chandra Bose's photo on Indian currency notes. The bench lauded the sacrifices made by Netaji. Justices Sundresh and Ananthi said that Netaji's contribution towards the Indian freedom movement was unparalleled. The advocate for the Union Government opposed the plea stating that it was not maintainable. At last, the bench had refused to allow the request of the petitioner.

=== EWS certificate case ===
A batch of petitions were filed by 'Akhila Bharatha Brahmin Association' and others seeking issuance of the income certificate for EWS. Justices M M Sundresh and R Hemalatha, of the Madras High Court while hearing the case relating to the "Economically Weaker Section Certificate (EWS Certificates)" had asked the Advocate General Vijay Narayan to know as to why such a condition that the certificate would be valid only for getting central government jobs and admissions in the centrally-run educational institutions, was laid down?

Advocate General Vijay Narayan said it was for the Central Government to clarify.

Advocate for the Tamil Nadu government submitted to the High Court that the EWS certificate issued to the Economically Weaker Sections can be used only to apply for posts under the 10 per cent quota in Central Government jobs and educational institutions only.

=== RBI case ===
Seal of the Reserve Bank of India ( RBI )

Justice Sundresh and Justice R Hemalatha, of the Madras High Court issued a notice to the Reserve Bank of India (RBI). asking it to respond to a Public Interest Litigation (PIL) filed with the Court challenging. The Non-Performing Assets (NPA) norms set by the banking regulator was challenged by the Petitioner. in that Public Interest Litigation Petition, the Bench had ordered the RBI to file the Reply.

In this case a direction was sought for from the Court to direct RBI to form a committee consisting of experts, stake-holders, bankers, economists and chartered accountants to re-look at the income-recognition and asset-classification norms currently in force and recommend a new set of norms.

=== Private complaint acquittal case ===
The full bench of Justices Sundresh, Bharathidasan, and Venkatesh have ruled that a challenge to an acquittal order passed by a Magistrate Court in private complaint should be filed before the High court and not before the Sessions Court. It also observed that a private complainant (such as a complainant in a cheque bouncing case) is different from that of a victim in a police report.

Justice P. N. Prakash of the Madras High Court was hearing this case earlier. But later, he had referred the case to the larger bench to decide whether the Judgement in Ganapathy Case relying on Satya Pal Singh V. State of Madhya Pradesh and others (2015) was correct or not? In the Satya Pal case, the Supreme Court had found that the term 'victim' also includes 'a complainant'. Therefore, it was held that a complainant can also invoke the proviso to Section 372 of CrPC and file an appeal against an order of acquittal.

When answering the question, the larger bench ruled that the S Ganapathy judgment had been passed without considering an earlier three-Judge Bench ruling of the Supreme Court in Damodar S. Prabhu v. Sayed Babalal H (2010). In the Damodar case it was held by the Supreme Court that in the case of acquittal by the judicial magistrate first class, the complainant could appeal to the High Court under Section 378(4) of the CrPC, and thereafter for special leave to appeal to the Supreme Court under Article 136.

The judgment was delivered by Justice Sundresh on behalf of Justice Bharathidasan. Justice Venkatesh pronounced a judgement concurring with the main judgment by stating that a victim in a case rooted in a police report and a complainant in a case arising out of a private complaint have been given a separate path to work out their right of appeal and one cannot cross over into the path of the other.

Almost all the High courts have held that a complainant can file an Appeal against acquittal only before the High Court under Section 378 (4) of Cr.PC.
