= Uday Umesh Lalit =

49th Chief Justice of India

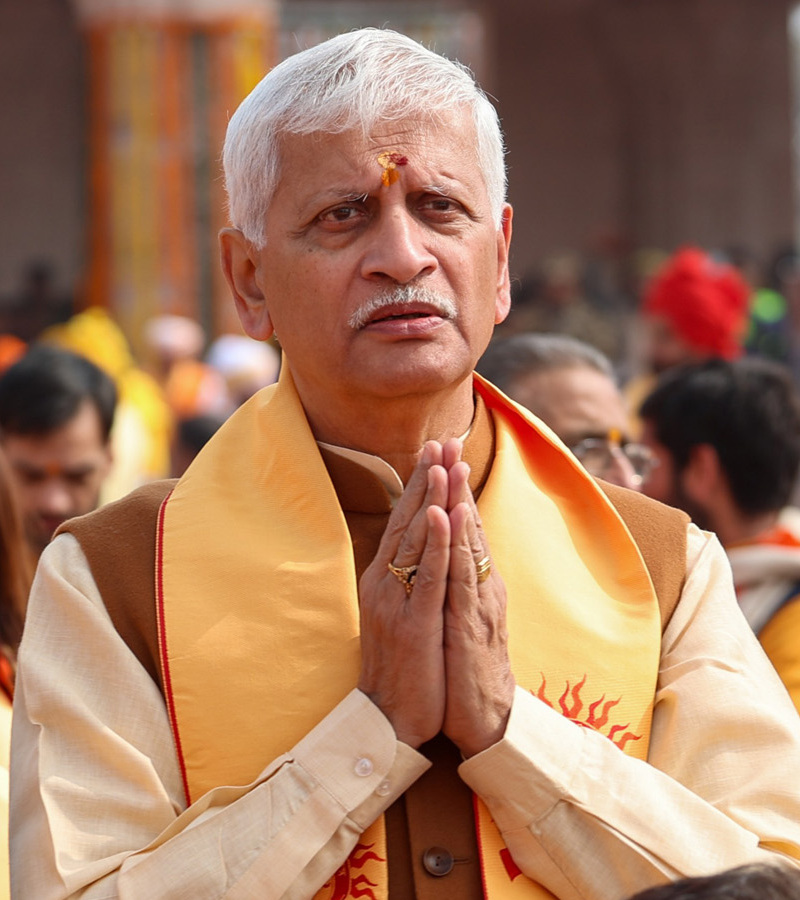
- Uday Lalit in 2024

49th Chief Justice of India
- In office 27 August 2022 – 8 November 2022
- President: Droupadi Murmu
- Preceded by: N. V. Ramana
- Succeeded by: Dhananjaya Y. Chandrachud

Judge of the Supreme Court of India
- In office 13 August 2014 – 26 August 2022
- Nominated by: Rajendra Mal Lodha
- Appointed by: Pranab Mukherjee

Personal details
- Born: 9 November 1957 (age 69) Solapur, Bombay State (present-day Maharashtra), India
- Spouse: Amita Lalit
- Parent: U.R. Lalit (father)
- Education: Government Law College, Mumbai, (LLB)

Uday Umesh Lalit (born 9 November 1957) is an Indian lawyer and former Supreme Court judge, who served as the 49th Chief Justice of India. Prior to his elevation as a judge of the Supreme Court, he practised as a senior advocate at the Supreme Court. Justice Lalit is one of the eleven senior counsels who have been directly elevated to the Supreme Court. He is currently ‘Distinguished Visiting Professor’ at Ashank Desai Centre for Policy Studies, Indian Institute of Technology, Bombay and Distinguished Visiting Professor at West Bengal National University of Juridical Sciences.

== Family and education ==
Lalit was born in Solapur to the family of U. R. Lalit, a former additional judge of the Bombay High Court Nagpur bench and a senior advocate practising at the Supreme Court of India. His family hails from Konkan but moved to Solapur when his grandfather, Ranganath Lalit, began practicing law. Ranganath Lalit chaired two separate civic receptions when Mahatma Gandhi and Jawaharlal Nehru visited Solapur. He is married to Amita Lalit.

Lalit attended Haribhai Deokaran High School in Solapur and is a law graduate from the Government Law College, Mumbai.

== Career ==
Lalit enrolled with the Bar Council of Maharashtra and Goa as an advocate in June 1983. He started his practice with advocate M.A. Rane, who was considered a proponent of the radical humanist school of thought who believed that social work was as important as building a solid legal practice. He shifted his practice to Delhi in 1985 and joined the chamber of senior advocate Pravin H. Parekh. From 1986 to 1992, Lalit worked with former Attorney General for India, Soli Sorabjee. On 3 May 1992, Lalit qualified and was registered as an Advocate-on-Record at the Supreme Court. On 29 April 2004, Lalit was designated as a senior advocate of the Supreme Court.

In 2011, a Supreme Court bench of Justices G. S. Singhvi and Asok Kumar Ganguly appointed Lalit as the special public prosecutor for the Central Bureau of Investigation (CBI) in the 2G spectrum cases, stating that "in the interest of a fair prosecution of the case, appointment of UU Lalit is eminently suitable". His professional strengths are described as 'thoroughness with the case, patience in explaining legal questions and the sober demeanour in presenting the case before the bench.

=== As a Supreme Court judge ===
In July 2014, the Supreme court collegium headed by then Chief Justice of India Rajendra Mal Lodha recommended his elevation to the Supreme Court as a judge. He was appointed as a judge on 13 August 2014 and became only the sixth lawyer to be directly elevated to the Supreme Court.

In 2017, he was part of the five-judge bench in the case against the unconstitutional nature of triple talaq, then being practiced by Indian Muslim men to divorce their wives by uttering the word "talaq" (divorce) three times. Along with Lalit, J S Khehar, Kurian Joseph, R F Nariman, and Abdul Nazeer delivered the verdict banning the practice.

On 10 January 2019, Justice Lalit recused himself from a five-judge bench constituted to hear the Ayodhya dispute case. His appearance for the erstwhile Chief Minister of Uttar Pradesh Kalyan Singh in a 'connected case' was brought to the notice of the court by Rajeev Dhavan, and the court in its order noted the 'disinclination' of Justice Lalit to participate in the matter. He has also recused himself from multiple other high-profile cases.

In May 2021, he was part of a bench which denied bail to 2018 Bhima Koregaon violence accused activist Gautam Navlakha.

He was part of the two-judge bench, along with Indu Malhotra, that upheld the Travancore royal family's right to administer the Padmanabhaswamy Temple on 13 July 2020.

=== As Chief Justice of India ===
On 10 August 2022, the President of India Droupadi Murmu appointed him the 49th Chief Justice of India. He took oath as the chief justice on 27 August 2022 in the Rashtrapati Bhavan. He is the second direct appointee from the Bar to be appointed as the Chief Justice of India.

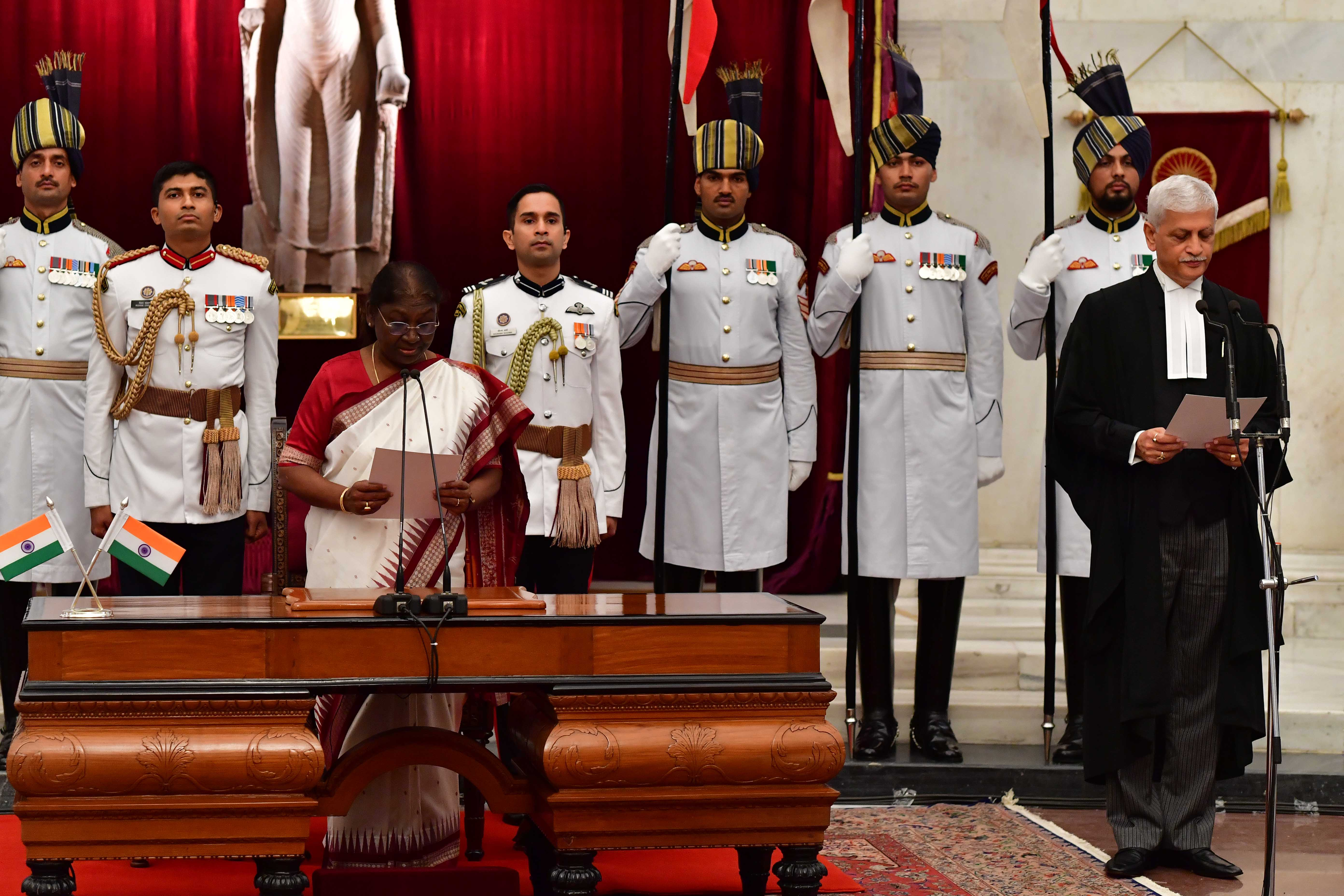
Justice UU Lalit Taking Oath as the Chief Justice of India

Chief Justice Lalit's tenure despite being short had brought major administrative changes to the court, a frantic pace of work with each bench of judges having to deal with 60-70 cases per day. Over the years Supreme Court's number of constitution bench judgements fell dramatically from an average of 134 in the 1960s to just 2 in 2021, this has led to 53 such critical constitutional cases being left unheard and pending. To reverse this trend Chief Justice U. U Lalit announced that a constitution bench would hear 25 constitutional cases on his first day of office, and under his tenure at least one constitutional bench functioned every day. The cases heard include the legality of the Citizenship Amendment Act, validity of demonetisation, setting up of regional benches of the supreme court, the declaring of Muslims as a socially and educationally backward community in Andhra Pradesh, right to a dignified death, protection of jallikattu, etc. There had also been a decline in the pendency of cases from 70,301 on September 1 to 69,461 on October 1. The supreme court began live streaming constitutional bench proceedings under his tenure. By the end of his tenure, the supreme court disposed of 10,000 cases while 8,700 cases were freshly filed which had resulted in a slight decrease in the pendency of cases and the court had set up 6 constitution benches.

Chief Justice Lalit could only recommend one new judge to the Supreme Court, thus his proposal to recommend four more judges to the court, to fill the vacancies in the court, failed to get approval of the collegium over procedural differences arising out of the proposal being sent by circulation instead of being presented in a face to face meeting, as the meeting scheduled on September 30 couldn't take place as one of its members Justice Dhananjaya Y. Chandrachud was busy hearing cases until 9:10 PM. As per procedure the Union Law Minister Kiren Rijiju wrote to the Chief Justice on October 7 almost a month before his retirement, asking for his recommendations for the appointment of his successor, by convention once this letter is sent the collegium freezes and no new decisions like induction of new judges will be taken until the appointment of next Chief Justice.

He was part of the dissenting opinion in the plea against the 103rd constitutional amendment which created 10% reservation for those designated to be part of the economically weaker section (EWS), the dissenting judges were of the view that the exclusion of SCs/STs, and OBCs from the quota was violation of equality and discriminatory, and that the judgement would act as a gateway to further infractions of the 50% ceiling set by the supreme court on reservation.

The supreme court under his tenure gave pro-civil liberties judgements like giving bail to activist Teesta Setalvad and the journalist Sidheeq Kappan. However his role in the unprecedented urgent Saturday morning hearing of the appeal against the acquittal of UAPA accused G. N. Saibaba by the Bombay High Court came into question, as the chief justice being the "master of the roster" has the power to decide when cases are listed and which bench of judges hears them.
