= V. Mohana =

Judge of Supreme Court of India

The Honourable Justice Venkita Subramani Mohana
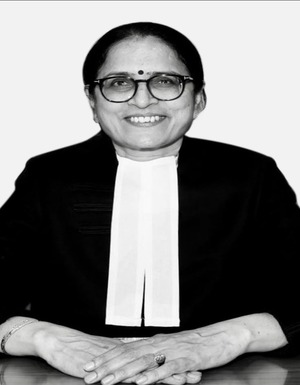
- Official portrait

Judge of Supreme Court of India
- Incumbent
- Assumed office 2 June 2026
- Nominated by: Surya Kant
- Appointed by: Droupadi Murmu

Personal details
- Born: 27 June 1966 (age 60) Pollachi, Madras State, India (present-day Tamil Nadu, India)
- Education: Coimbatore Law College

Venkita Subramani Mohana (born 27 June 1966) is a sitting judge of the Supreme Court of India since 2 June 2026. She has earlier served as a senior advocate in the Supreme Court of India.

== Career ==
Born on 27 June 1966 in Pollachi, Coimbatore district. Mohana is a first generation lawyer who graduated from Coimbatore Law College in 1988 as part of India's first batch of the five-year law course. She has worked with then advocate Indu Malhotra who later served as a Judge of the Supreme Court of India. Thereafter, she joined the chambers of Senior Advocate C. S. Vaidyanathan. In 1996, she became a Supreme Court Advocate-on-Record and practised in Supreme Court of India, Delhi High Court and various Tribunals in the capital. In 2015, she was designated as a Senior Advocate by the Supreme Court. She worked in constitutional, civil and criminal matters and also served as amicus curiae in many high profile cases. In Supreme Court, she appeared in cases such as 2022 Karnataka hijab row, permanent commission for women officers in the Indian Army. She also represented the Union of India in 2015 National Judicial Appointments Commission case. She was appointed as a Judge of the Supreme Court of India on 2 June 2026. She is the 12th female judge in the history of the Supreme Court of India and the 2nd female judge who was directly elevated from Bar to the Supreme Court bench.
