= Kamal Narain Singh =

22nd Chief Justice of India (1926–2022)

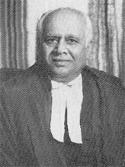

Chairman of 13th Law Commission of India
- In office 1991–1994
- Appointed by: R. Venkataraman
- Prime Minister: P. V. Narasimha Rao

22nd Chief Justice of India
- In office 25 November 1991 – 12 December 1991
- Appointed by: Ramaswamy Venkataraman
- Preceded by: Ranganath Misra
- Succeeded by: M.H. Kania

Judge of Supreme Court of India
- In office 10 March 1986 – 24 November 1991
- Nominated by: P. N. Bhagwati
- Appointed by: Zail Singh

Judge of Allahabad High Court
- In office 25 August 1970 – 9 March 1986
- Nominated by: M. Hidayatullah
- Appointed by: V. V. Giri

Advocate General of Uttar Pradesh
- In office 3 March 1970 – 3 May 1970
- Appointed by: Bezawada Gopala Reddy
- Chief Minister: Charan Singh

Personal details
- Born: 13 December 1926
- Died: 8 September 2022 (aged 95) Allahabad, Uttar Pradesh, India
- Education: University of Allahabad

Kamal Narain Singh (13 December 1926 – 8 September 2022) was an Indian jurist who served as the 22nd Chief Justice of India. He was educated at L.R.L.A. High School in Sirsa and Ewing Christian College in Allahabad and was a graduate of the University of Allahabad. At 17 days, his tenure as chief justice is the shortest.

== Legal career ==
As a lawyer, Singh practiced civil, constitutional and taxation law from 1957. His first judicial appointment was as additional judge of the Allahabad High Court in 1970. He was confirmed as permanent judge in 1972. He joined the Supreme Court in 1986 and served as Chief Justice of India from 25 November 1991 until 12 December 1991.

Over the course of his Supreme Court tenure, Singh authored 100 judgments and sat on 336 benches.

He was honored with "Proud Past Alumni" by the University of Allahabad Alumni Association.

Legal offices
Preceded by Ranganath Misra	Chief Justice of India; 25 November 1991–12 December 1991	Succeeded by Madhukar Hiralal Kania
