= Advocate-on-Record =

Role in the Supreme Court of India

Advocates-on-Record is an advocate who is entitled under the Order IV of the Supreme Court Rules, 2013 (previously Order IV of the Supreme Court of India Rules, 1966), framed by the Supreme Court of India under Article 145 of the Constitution, to act as well as to plead for a party in the Supreme Court of India. As per the rules, no advocate other than an advocate on record shall be entitled to file an appearance or act for a party in the Supreme Court of India. No advocate other than an advocate on record can appear and plead in any matter unless he is instructed by an advocate-on-record.

== Qualification ==
An advocate can be registered as an advocate-on-record if they qualify the requirements as laid down in the Supreme Court of India Rules, 2013 and 'Regulations regarding Advocates-on-Record Examination'. If an advocate wants to practice as an advocate-on-record in the Supreme Court, they need an additional qualification. The advocate has to practice for four years as an advocate and thereafter has to demonstrate to the Supreme Court that they have started taking training with a Senior Advocate on record because they intend to become an Advocate-on-record. After the expiry of one year's training, the advocate has to appear for an examination conducted by the Supreme Court itself. The examination is one of the toughest examination with pass percentage of 20%. After an advocate passes this examination they must have a registered office within a radius of 10 miles from the Supreme Court building and a registered clerk. It is after this that the Chamber Judge of the Supreme Court accepts them as an advocate-on-record.

A solicitor on the rolls of the Bombay Incorporated Law Society whose name has been borne on the roll of State Bar Council for the period of not less than seven years on the date of making the application for registration as an advocate-on-record is exempted from taking the above test.

== Association ==
Supreme Court Advocates-On-Record Association (SCAORA) is the official association of the Advocates-on-Record.
