= B. V. Nagarathna =

Judge of Supreme Court of India(born 1962)

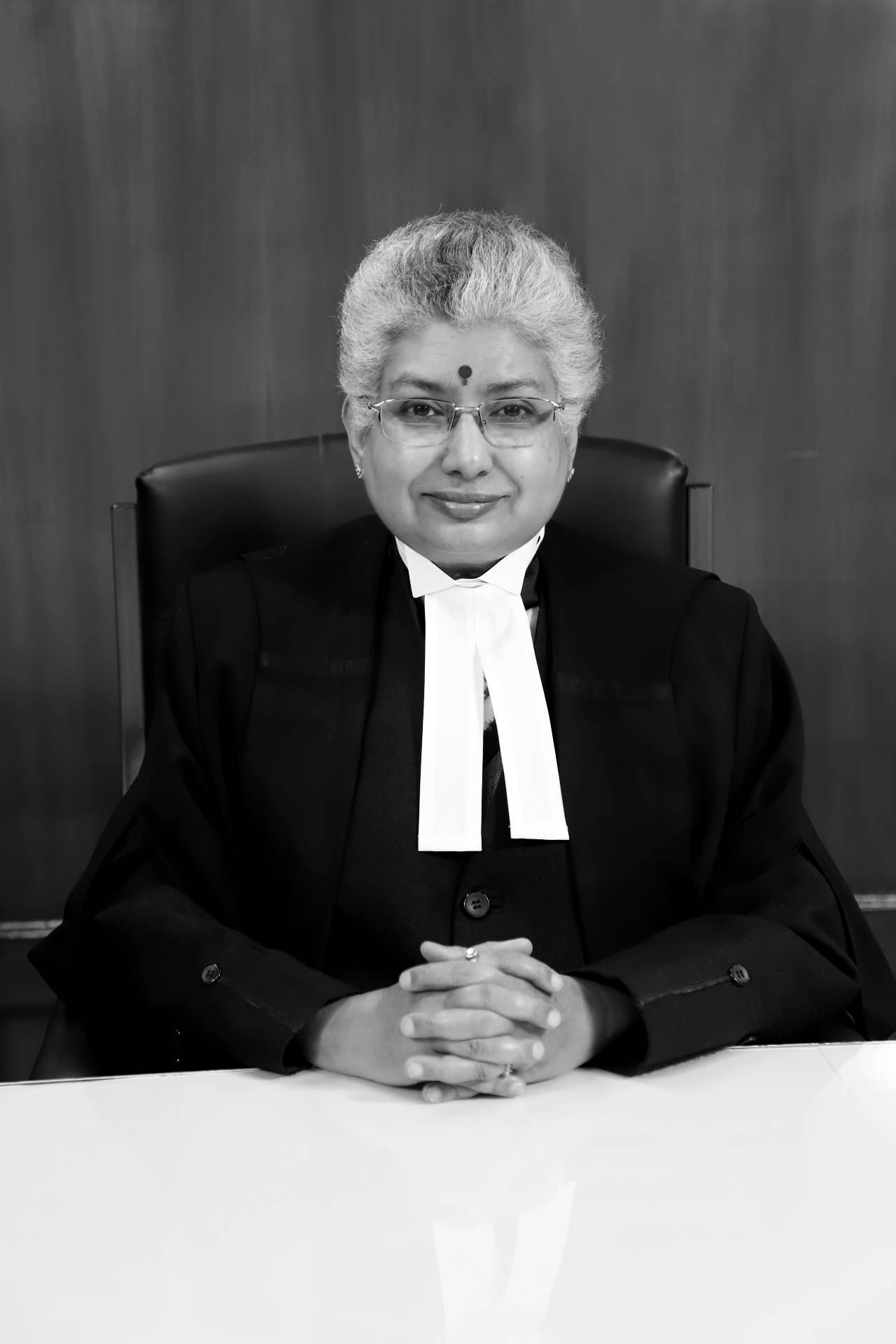
- Official portrait

Judge of the Supreme Court of India
- Incumbent
- Assumed office 31 August 2021
- Nominated by: N. V. Ramana
- Appointed by: Ram Nath Kovind

Judge of the Karnataka High Court
- In office 18 February 2008 – 30 August 2021
- Nominated by: K. G. Balakrishnan
- Appointed by: Pratibha Patil

Personal details
- Born: Engalaguppe Venkataramaiah Nagarathna; 30 October 1962 (age 63) Pandavapura, Mysore State, India
- Spouse: B. N. Gopala Krishna
- Parent: Engalaguppe Seetharamiah Venkataramiah (father)
- Education: Jesus and Mary College, Faculty of Law, University of Delhi

Bangalore Venkataramiah Nagarathna (née Engalaguppe, born 30 October 1962) is an Indian jurist who has served as a judge of the Supreme Court of India since 2021. She served as a judge of the Karnataka High Court from 2008 to 2021. Her father, Engalaguppe Seetharamiah Venkataramiah, was the Chief Justice of India in 1989.

She gained public attention in 2009 after being forcibly detained within the Karnataka High Court premises by a group of protesting lawyers. She has delivered a number of significant judgments relating to commercial and constitutional law in Karnataka.

She will be the first woman CJI in 2027. However, her tenure will only span 36 days.

== Early life and education ==
Nagarathna's father, E.S. Venkataramiah, was the 19th Chief Justice of India. She was educated at Sophia High School, Bangalore, and at Bharatiya Vidya Bhavan, New Delhi. She then completed her B.A. in History from Jesus and Mary College, New Delhi, in 1984. Later, she earned a degree in Law from the Faculty of Law, University of Delhi.

== Career ==
She enrolled with the Bar Council of Karnataka in 1987 and practiced constitutional and commercial law in Bangalore before being appointed as an additional judge of the Karnataka High Court in 2008. She was appointed as a permanent judge on 17 February 2010.

In May 2020, B.V. Nagarathna was reported as being considered for appointment to the Supreme Court of India, leading a number of commentators to note that this would make her eligible to become the first female chief justice of the India Supreme Court.

On 26 August 2021, she was appointed as a judge of the Supreme Court of India and took her oath on 31 August 2021. She is in line to become first woman Chief Justice of India in year 2027.

== Notable judgments and opinions ==
=== Dissent in the demonetisation judgement ===
Nagrathna, as a part of a five judge bench consisting of Justices S Abdul Nazeer, BR Gavai, AS Bopanna, V Ramasubramanian and herself had reserved the judgement on December 7, 2022. On 2 January 2023, the same was revealed. While the 4–1 majority judgement upheld the constitutional validity of the demonetisation, J. Nagarathna dissented.

In her dissenting view held that demonetisation of the whole series of Rs 500 and Rs 1000 currency notes is a serious matter and it could not be done by the centre by merely issuing a gazette notification.

She stated that her views on each of the questions as framed by Gavai J's majority judgement differed significantly. As per her judgement the measure was well-intentioned and well thought of. It targeted evils such as blackmoney, terror funding and counterfeiting. The measure is declared unlawful purely on legal grounds and not on the basis of objects.

=== Sensationalist news ===
In 2012, along with another judge, she ordered the union government to examine the possibility of regulating broadcast media in India, noting the rise of fake news. In a concurring opinion, she also warned against the risks of allowing government control over broadcast media, calling for a statutory framework that would allow self-regulation by the broadcast industry.

=== Vehicle taxation ===
In 2016, she ruled along with another judge that the Karnataka government could not require owners of vehicles bought outside the state to pay a "lifetime tax" in order to use their vehicles in Karnataka, holding the policy to be unconstitutional.

=== Non-commercial status of temples ===
In 2019, along with two other judges, she ruled that temples were not commercial institutions and accordingly, that provisions of labour laws relating to the payment of gratuities did not apply to temple employees.

=== Autonomy of private institutions ===
On 15 September 2020, she and another judge upheld a contested government policy to ensure the standardization of admissions into both, public and private colleges in Karnataka, citing the COVID-19 pandemic in India as a reason to limit the autonomy of private institutions.

=== Detention by lawyers ===
In 2009, she and another judge, Venkate Gopala Gowda, were unlawfully detained, along with the then-Chief Justice of the Karnataka High Court, P. D. Dinakaran, by a group of protesting lawyers in the Karnataka High Court. The incident occurred following the declaration of a boycott of courts by lawyers' association, who were protesting following allegations of corruption against P. D. Dinakaran. They were later released by the protesting lawyers. Following the incident, Nagarathna made a public statement, saying, "We cannot be cowed down like this. We have taken the oath of Constitution."

=== Status of education during the COVID-19 pandemic ===
Nagarathna was part of the bench that rejected the Karnataka government's proposal to halt mid-day meals in COVID-affected areas. The bench also coaxed the government to bridge the digital divide and ensure children have access to online classes. Further the bench directed teachers and non-teaching staff to be treated as frontline workers.
