= E. S. Venkataramiah =

19th Chief Justice of India

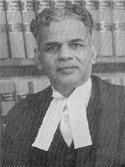

19th Chief Justice of India
- In office 19 June 1989 – 17 December 1989
- Appointed by: Ramaswamy Venkataraman
- Preceded by: R.S. Pathak
- Succeeded by: Sabyasachi Mukharji

Judge of Supreme Court of India
- In office 8 March 1979 – 18 June 1989
- Nominated by: Y. V. Chandrachud
- Appointed by: Neelam Sanjiva Reddy

Judge of Karnataka High Court
- In office 25 June 1970 – 7 March 1979
- Nominated by: M. Hidayatullah
- Appointed by: V. V. Giri

Advocate General of Karnataka
- In office 5 March 1970 – 24 June 1970
- Appointed by: Dharma Vira
- Chief Minister: Veerendra Patil
- Preceded by: V. S. Malimath
- Succeeded by: S. G. Sundara Swamy

Personal details
- Born: 18 December 1924
- Died: 24 September 1997 (aged 72)
- Children: B. V. Nagarathna
- Education: B. A., L.L.B

Engalaguppe Seetharamiah Venkataramiah (18 December 1924 – 24 September 1997) was an Indian judge, who served as the 19th Chief Justice of India, from 19 June 1989 until his retirement on 17 December 1989. He began his legal career in 1946, and was appointed as a judge of the Karnataka High Court in November 1970.

On 8 March 1979, he was appointed as judge of the Supreme Court of India, and became the Chief Justice of India in June 1989. He was the first judge from Karnataka to become the Chief Justice of India. Over the course of his Supreme Court tenure, Venkataramiah authored 256 judgments and sat on 720 benches. He died of a heart attack on 24 September 1997.

He also served as Advocate General for the Mysore State (now Karnataka) from March to June 1970. His daughter B. V. Nagarathna is a sitting judge of the Supreme Court of India.

Legal offices
Preceded by Raghunandan Swarup Pathak	Chief Justice of India; 19 June 1989– 17 December 1989	Succeeded by Sabyasachi Mukharji
