= Surya Kant =

53rd Chief Justice of India

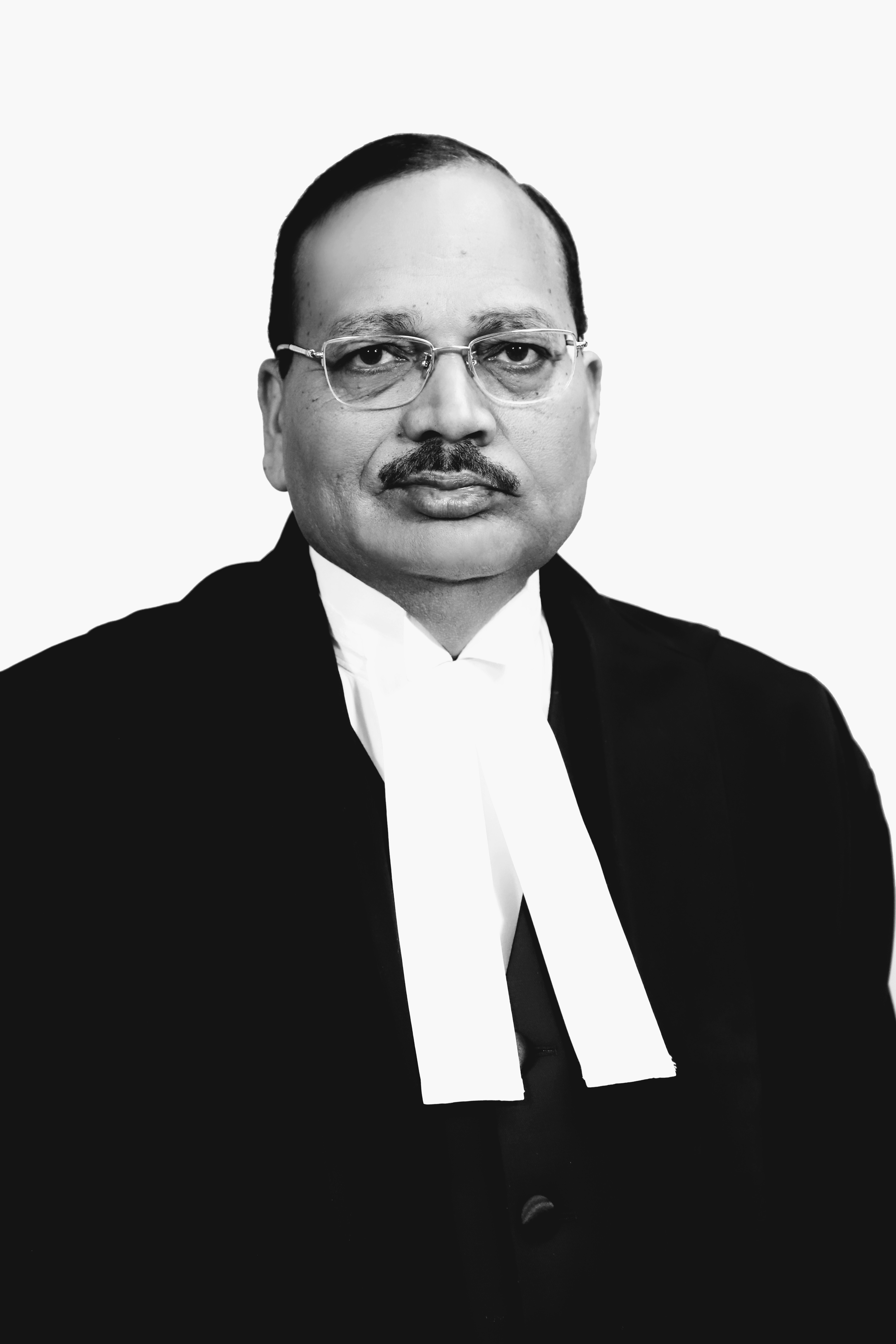
- Official portrait, 2019

53rd Chief Justice of India
- Incumbent
- Assumed office 24 November 2025
- Appointed by: Droupadi Murmu
- Preceded by: B. R. Gavai

Judge of Supreme Court of India
- In office 24 May 2019 – 23 November 2025
- Nominated by: Ranjan Gogoi
- Appointed by: Ram Nath Kovind

23rd Chief Justice of Himachal Pradesh High Court
- In office 5 October 2018 – 23 May 2019
- Nominated by: Dipak Misra
- Appointed by: Ram Nath Kovind
- Preceded by: Mansoor Ahmad Mir; Sanjay Karol (acting)
- Succeeded by: V. Ramasubramanian

Judge of Punjab and Haryana High Court
- In office 9 January 2004 – 4 October 2018
- Nominated by: V. N. Khare
- Appointed by: A. P. J. Abdul Kalam

Advocate-General of Haryana
- In office 7 July 2000 – 8 January 2004
- Appointed by: Babu Parmanand
- Chief Minister: Om Prakash Chautala
- Preceded by: Manmohan Lal Sarin
- Succeeded by: Ashok Aggarwal

Personal details
- Born: Surya Kant Sharma; 10 February 1962 (age 64) Petwar, Punjab, India
- Education: Govt. Post Graduate College, Hisar (B.A.); Maharishi Dayanand University (LL.B.); Kurukshetra University (LL.M.)

Surya Kant (born 10 February 1962) is an Indian jurist and the 53rd Chief Justice of India. Prior to his elevation as judge, Kant was a Senior Advocate and has served the Advocate General for Haryana. He is also the visitor of National University of Study and Research in Law, Ranchi, and the ex officio patron-in-chief of National Legal Services Authority.

== Early life and education ==
Surya Kant Sharma was born on 10 February 1962, in Petwar, Haryana, into a middle class family. His father, Madan Gopal Sharma, was a Sanskrit teacher. He graduated in (B.A. in Geography) from the Government Post Graduate College, Hisar in 1981 and earned his Bachelor of Laws from Maharishi Dayanand University in 1984. He stood First Class First in his Master of Laws from Kurukshetra University. On 7 July 2000 he became the youngest Advocate General of Haryana.

== Career ==
Kant was the youngest Advocate General of Haryana. He was made a judge of the Punjab & Haryana High Court on 9 January 2004. Kant was nominated as a member of the National Legal Services Authority on 23 February 2007 for two consecutive terms. Kant organised and attended several prestigious conferences. On 5 October 2018, he took oath as the Chief Justice of the Himachal Pradesh High Court. On 9 May 2019, the Supreme Court collegium headed by Chief Justice Ranjan Gogoi recommended his elevation to the Supreme Court of India. On 24 May 2019, Kant took oath as a judge of the Supreme Court, a position he served until 23 November 2025.

Kant took oath as the 53rd Chief Justice of India (CJI) on 24 November 2025 during a ceremony held at Rashtrapati Bhavan.

== Notable judgements ==
Kant has delivered numerous judgements on human rights, gender justice, education and prison reforms inter alia. During his tenure at the Punjab and Haryana High Court, he delivered the Jasvir Singh judgement, directing the State of Punjab to form a Jail Reforms Committee for creating a scheme for enabling conjugal and family visits for jail inmates keeping in mind the beneficial nature and reformatory goals of such amenities.

Justice Kant has been involved in several important decisions of the Supreme Court such as:

- Abrogation of Article 370 of the Constitution which removed the special status to the erstwhile State of Jammu and Kashmir.
- He was appointed in the initial 3-judge bench with CJI Bobde and Justice B. R. Gavai in 2020, hearing the Public Interest Litigation (PIL) petition, made by the Association for Democratic Reforms (ADR) and the Communist Party of India (Marxist) in 2018, against the constitutionality of the Electoral bonds scheme.
- Pegasus Project revelations in India case.
- Suspension of the sedition law.
- 16th Presidential Reference
- Article 212(1) does not put an embargo on ‘Legislative Decision’

== Controversies ==
=== Allegations of corruption ===
In 2019, Kant was alleged to have been involved in illegal property dealings, undervaluation, and cash transactions worth crores in 2012 along with a real-estate agent named Satish Kumar Jain. This claim was supported by sale deeds for four properties, two of which were obtained by Jain on behalf of Kant but never paid for. Jain also helped sell "benami" properties for Kant which were undervalued on paper and for which cash deals were made. In 2017, a Punjab prisoner filed complaints that Kant sought bribes to grant bail.

=== India Got Latent Case ===
In February 2025, Kant's involvement in the high-profile India's Got Latent case drew a lot of attention. The case stemmed from a controversy surrounding Indian comedian Ranveer Allahabadia, who was a participant in the comedy talent show India's Got Latent. During the show, Allahabadia posed a question to a contestant: "Would you rather watch your parents have sex every day for the rest of your life or join in once to make it stop forever?" The remark ignited a nationwide controversy, before it ultimately reached the Supreme Court. Kant, serving on the case, expressed strong disapproval of Allahabadia's remarks. During the hearing, he said that he knew how to "deal" with "youngsters who think we are outdated" and criticised them for "being oversmart." He asserted that "there is nothing like a fundamental right on a platter," and added that citizens must fulfill their "duty" in order to enjoy their fundamental rights.

=== NCERT curriculum ===
On 26 February 2026, Kant slammed the NCERT, after a class 8 social science textbook revealed a section on corruption in the judiciary. Calling it a deep-rooted conspiracy to defame and undermine the judiciary in a suo motu case hearing, Kant stated that the move to teach pupils about judicial corruption and pendency of cases as reckless, and ordered that the books should not be issued to students. Kant, along with several judges and lawyers, also issued warnings to a law student to take down an article criticizing the judiciary for the order against NCERT.

=== Cockroaches and parasites remark ===
On 15 May 2026, Kant faced criticism when he compared the unemployed youth to "cockroaches" and "parasites" who go on to attack institutions through social media activism and litigation. The remarks, made while hearing a petition concerning the designation of senior advocates by the Delhi High Court, drew backlash from critics who described the language as inappropriate and insensitive. A satirical political movement called the Cockroach Janta Party (CJP; transl. Cockroach People's Party), in direct reference to the remarks, was founded the following day. Kant later said that his comments were about those that entered "legal, media, social media, and other noble professions" with "fake and bogus degrees" and expressed that he held immense respect for the youth.

=== Remarks about Delhi Jantar Mantar protest ===
On 22 July 2026, the Supreme Court of India declined an urgent hearing of a petition alleging police brutality against protestors at the Jantar Mantar protests. The matter was mentioned before a bench led by Kant, comprising Justices Joymalya Bagchi and V. Mohana. When the petitioner's lawyer said video evidence of the alleged brutality was available and asked for the matter to be listed the next day, Kant said the bench was "not interested in videos" and had "no time to watch" them, adding, "don't waste our time."
