= Chief Justice of India =

Chief judge of the Supreme Court of India

- Supreme Court Emblem

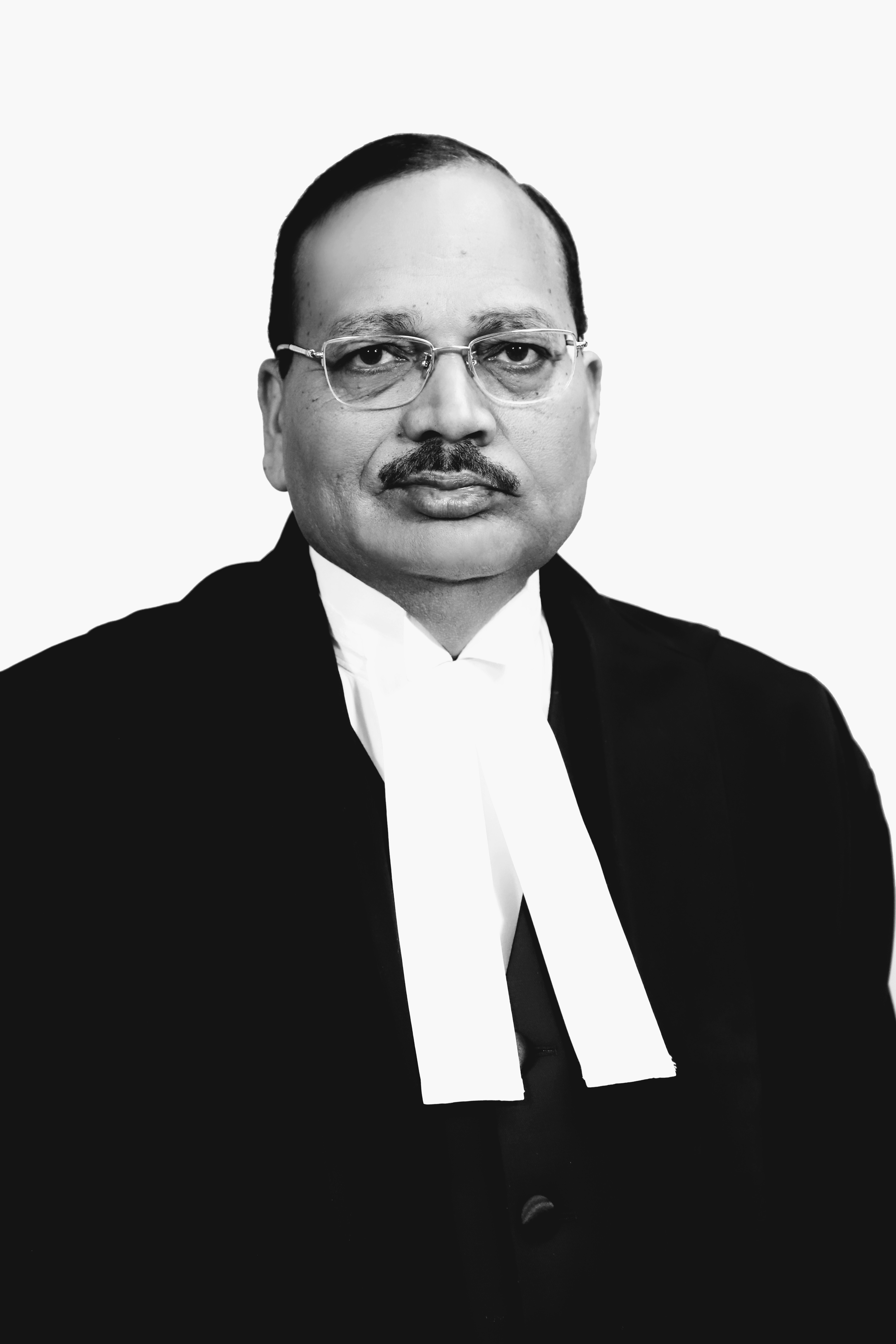
- Incumbent; Surya Kant since 24 November 2025
- Style: Honourable Justice
- Type: Chief Justice
- Status: Presiding Judge of Supreme Court of India
- Abbreviation: CJI
- Member of: Collegium
- Residence: 5, Krishna Menon Marg, Sunehri Bagh, New Delhi
- Seat: Supreme Court building, New Delhi
- Appointer: President of India
- Term length: No term limit; Serves until the age of 65 (Note: The chief justice can be impeached by the Parliament of India, and removed from office, before the end of the tenure.)
- Constituting instrument: Constitution of India (Article 124)
- Formation: 26 January 1950; 76 years ago
- First holder: H. J. Kania
- Succession: 6th (on the Indian order of precedence)
- Salary: ₹280,000 (US$2,900) (per month)
- Website: sci.gov.in

The chief justice of India (CJI) is the chief judge of the Supreme Court of India and the highest-ranking officer of the Indian judiciary. The Constitution of India grants power to the president of India to appoint the chief justice, as recommended by the outgoing chief justice in consultation with other judges of the Supreme Court. The chief justice serves until the age of 65 or if removed early by the constitutional process of impeachment. The chief justice ranks sixth in the Order of precedence in India. As head of the Supreme Court, the chief justice is responsible for the allocation of cases and other administrative functions of the court.

Surya Kant is the incumbent and 53rd chief justice of India, and was appointed on 24th November 2025.

== Appointment ==
The Constitution of India grants power to the president of India to appoint the chief justice, as recommended by the outgoing chief justice in consultation with other judges of the Supreme Court. As an incumbent chief justice approaches retirement, the ministry of law and justice seeks a recommendation for the next chief justice from the incumbent office holder. The recommendation is then presented to the prime minister, who will advice the president in the matter of appointment.

As per convention, the successor suggested by the incumbent chief justice is most often the next senior most judge of the Supreme Court by tenure. However, this convention has been broken twice, when A. N. Ray was appointed in 1973, superseding three senior judges–J. M. Shelat, A. N. Grover and K. S. Hegde, and when M. H. Beg was appointed in 1977, superseding H. R. Khanna.

== Tenure and removal ==
Once appointed, the chief justice remains in office until the age 65, unless removed earlier. As per the Article 124(4) of the Constitution of India, the procedure for the removal of a judge of the Supreme Court, is applicable to the chief justice as well. The chief justice can be removed through impeachment by the parliament.

A Judge of the Supreme Court shall not be removed from his office except by an order of the President passed after an address by each House of Parliament supported by a majority of the total membership of that House and by a majority of not less than two-thirds of the members of that House present and voting has been presented to the President in the same session for such removal on the ground of proved misbehaviour or incapacity.

— Article 124(4), Constitution of India,

For initiating impeachment proceedings against a chief justice, at least 50 members of Rajya Sabha or 100 members of Lok Sabha shall issue the notice as per the Judges (Inquiry) Act of 1968. Post the notice, a judicial committee would be formed to frame charges against the judge, to conduct a fair trial and to submit a report to parliament. When the judicial committee report finds the judge guilty of misbehavior or incapacity, further removal proceedings would be taken up by the parliament if the judge is not resigning himself. The judge upon proven guilty is also liable for punishment per applicable laws or for contempt of the constitution by breaching the oath under the Prevention of Insults to National Honour Act, 1971.

== Emoluments ==
As per the Article 125 of the constitution, the Indian parliament is responsible for determining the salary, and other emolutments of the judges. However, the parliament is not allowed alter any of these privileges rights to the judge's disadvantage after their appointment. Accordingly, such provisions have been laid down in The Supreme Court Judges (Salaries and Conditions of Service) Act, 1958. This remuneration was revised in 2006–2008 after the Sixth Central Pay Commission's recommendation, and increased further in 2016 as per the seventh pay commission. The chief justice earns basic salary of ₹280,000 (US$2,900) per month.

== Powers and functions ==
As the head of the Supreme Court, the chief justice is responsible for the allocation of cases to the other judges, and the appointment of constitutional benches that deal with important matters of law or the interpretation of the constitution. If the chief justice allocates a work to the other judges, they are bound to refer the matter back to the chief justice for re-allocation if it to be looked into by another group of experienced judges or conflict of interest. The chief justice carries out administrative functions such as the maintenance of the roster, appointment of court officials, and general and miscellaneous matters relating to the supervision and functioning of the Supreme Court, and is aided by the officials of the Court. The chief justice also serves as the de facto chancellor of National Law School of India University and West Bengal National University of Juridical Sciences.

=== Acting president ===
As per the President (Discharge of Functions) Act, 1969, the chief justice shall act as the president if the offices of both the president and the vice president are vacant. As per the convention, then the senior most judge of the Supreme Court takes over as the role of the chief justice. When president Zakir Hussain died in office in May 1969, vice president V. V. Giri acted as the president. Later, when Giri resigned as the vice president, to contest in the 1969 Indian presidential election, Mohammad Hidayatullah, then chief justice, became the acting president. When the newly elected president took office a month later, Hidayatullah reverted to his role as the chief justice.

== List of chief justices of India ==
=== Chief Justices of the Federal Court of India ===
The Federal Court of India came into being on 1 October 1937. The seat of the court was in Delhi and it functioned until the establishment of the Supreme Court of India on 28 January 1950. The first chief justice was Sir Maurice Gwyer.

Key

‡ Acting Chief Justice

Chief Justices of the Federal Court of India
No.	Name (birth–death)	Image	Start of Term	End of Term	Length of term	Parent Bar / High Court	Appointed by (Governor-General of India)	Ref.
1	Sir Maurice Linford Gwyer (1878–1952)	Maurice Linford Gwyer	1 October 1937	25 April 1943	5 years, 206 days	Inner Temple	Victor Hope	
—	Sir Srinivas Varadachariar^{‡} (1881–1970)	—	25 April 1943	7 June 1943	43 days	Madras	Victor Hope	
2	Sir William Patrick Spens (1885–1973)	William Patrick Spens	7 June 1943	13 August 1947	4 years, 68 days	Inner Temple	Victor Hope	
3	Harilal Jekisundas Kania (1890–1951)	Harilal Jekisundas Kania	14 August 1947	26 January 1950	2 years, 165 days	Bombay	Louis Mountbatten	

=== Chief Justices ===
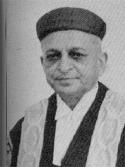
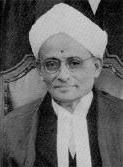
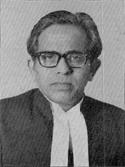
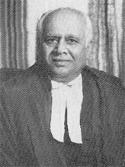
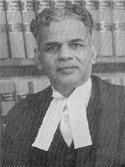
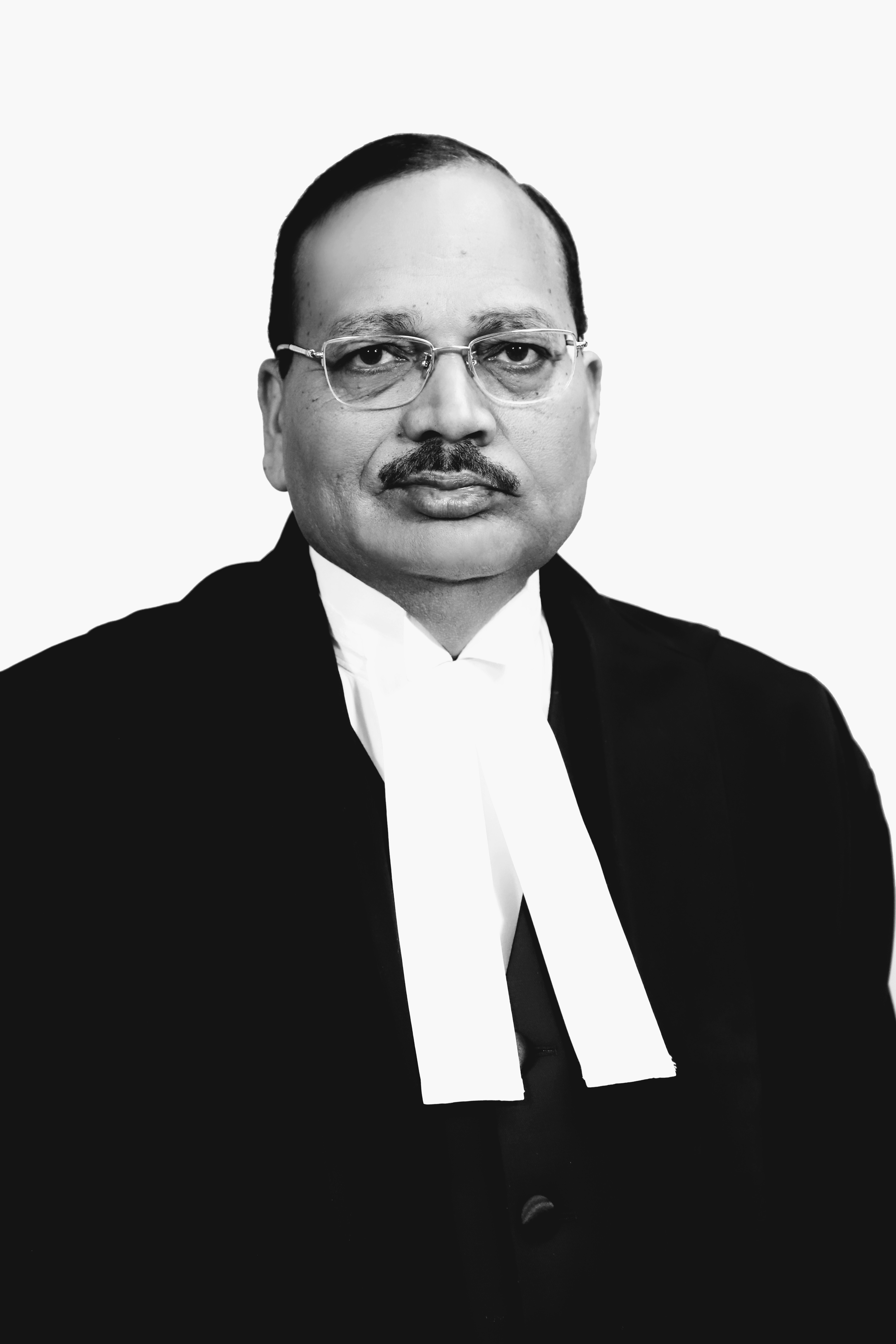
- Top left: H. J. Kania was the first Chief Justice of India.
- Top centre: M. Patanjali Sastri was the first Chief Justice elevated from South India.
- Top right: Y. V. Chandrachud was the longest serving Chief Justice (seven years).
- Bottom left: Kamal Narain Singh was the shortest serving Chief Justice (seventeen days).
- Bottom centre: E. S. Venkataramiah was the first Chief Justice elevated from Karnataka.
- Bottom right: Surya Kant is the present Chief Justice.

Key
†	Died in office
‡	Resigned

No.	Image	Name (birth–death)	Start of Term	End of Term	Length of Term	Parent High Court	Appointed by (President of India)	Ref.
1	Harilal Jekisundas Kania	Harilal Jekisundas Kania (1890–1951)	26 January 1950	6 November 1951^{†}	1 year, 284 days	Bombay	Rajendra Prasad	
2	Mandakolathur Patanjali Sastri	Mandakolathur Patanjali Sastri (1889–1963)	7 November 1951	3 January 1954	2 years, 57 days	Madras	Rajendra Prasad	
3	Mehr Chand Mahajan	Mehr Chand Mahajan (1889–1967)	4 January 1954	22 December 1954	352 days	Lahore	Rajendra Prasad	
4	Bijan Kumar Mukherjea	Bijan Kumar Mukherjea (1891–1956)	23 December 1954	31 January 1956^{‡}	1 year, 39 days	Calcutta	Rajendra Prasad	
5	Sudhi Ranjan Das	Sudhi Ranjan Das (1894–1977)	1 February 1956	30 September 1959	3 years, 241 days	Calcutta	Rajendra Prasad	
6	Bhuvaneshwar Prasad Sinha	Bhuvaneshwar Prasad Sinha (1899–1986)	1 October 1959	31 January 1964	4 years, 122 days	Patna	Rajendra Prasad	
7	Pralhad Balacharya Gajendragadkar	Pralhad Balacharya Gajendragadkar (1901–1981)	1 February 1964	15 March 1966	2 years, 42 days	Bombay	Sarvepalli Radhakrishnan	
8	Amal Kumar Sarkar	Amal Kumar Sarkar (1901–2001)	16 March 1966	29 June 1966	105 days	Calcutta	Sarvepalli Radhakrishnan	
9	Koka Subba Rao	Koka Subba Rao (1902–1976)	30 June 1966	11 April 1967^{‡}	285 days	Madras	Sarvepalli Radhakrishnan	
10	Kailas Nath Wanchoo	Kailas Nath Wanchoo (1903–1988)	12 April 1967	24 February 1968	318 days	Allahabad	Sarvepalli Radhakrishnan	
11	Mohammad Hidayatullah	Mohammad Hidayatullah (1905–1992) (Note: Also served as acting President of India and Vice President of India)	25 February 1968	16 December 1970	2 years, 294 days	Nagpur	Zakir Hussain	
12	Jayantilal Chhotalal Shah	Jayantilal Chhotalal Shah (1906–1991)	17 December 1970	21 January 1971	35 days	Bombay	V. V. Giri	
13	Sarv Mittra Sikri	Sarv Mittra Sikri (1908–1992)	22 January 1971	25 April 1973	2 years, 93 days	Bar Council	V. V. Giri	
14	Ajit Nath Ray	Ajit Nath Ray (1912–2009)	26 April 1973	28 January 1977	3 years, 276 days	Calcutta	V. V. Giri	
15	Mirza Hameedullah Beg	Mirza Hameedullah Beg (1913–1988)	29 January 1977	21 February 1978	1 year, 24 days	Allahabad	Fakhruddin Ali Ahmed	
16	Yeshwant Vishnu Chandrachud	Yeshwant Vishnu Chandrachud (1920–2008)	22 February 1978	11 July 1985	7 years, 139 days	Bombay	Neelam Sanjiva Reddy	
17	Prafullachandra Natwarlal Bhagwati	Prafullachandra Natwarlal Bhagwati (1921–2017)	12 July 1985	20 December 1986	1 year, 161 days	Gujarat	Zail Singh	
18	Raghunandan Swarup Pathak	Raghunandan Swarup Pathak (1924–2007)	21 December 1986	18 June 1989^{‡}	2 years, 209 days	Allahabad	Zail Singh	
19	E. S. Venkataramiah	Engalaguppe Seetharamiah Venkataramiah (1924–1997)	19 June 1989	17 December 1989	181 days	Karnataka	Ramaswamy Venkataraman	
20	Sabyasachi Mukharji	Sabyasachi Mukharji (1927–1990)	18 December 1989	25 September 1990^{†}	281 days	Calcutta	Ramaswamy Venkataraman	
21	Ranganath Misra	Ranganath Misra (1926–2012)	26 September 1990	24 November 1991	1 year, 59 days	Orissa	Ramaswamy Venkataraman	
22	Kamal Narain Singh	Kamal Narain Singh (1926–2022)	25 November 1991	12 December 1991	17 days	Allahabad	Ramaswamy Venkataraman	
23	Madhukar Hiralal Kania	Madhukar Hiralal Kania (1927–2016)	13 December 1991	17 November 1992	340 days	Bombay	Ramaswamy Venkataraman	
24	Lalit Mohan Sharma	Lalit Mohan Sharma (1928–2008)	18 November 1992	11 February 1993	85 days	Patna	Shankar Dayal Sharma	
25	M. N. Venkatachaliah	Manepalli Narayanarao Venkatachaliah (born 1929)	12 February 1993	24 October 1994	1 year, 254 days	Karnataka	Shankar Dayal Sharma	
26	Aziz Mushabber Ahmadi	Aziz Mushabber Ahmadi (1932–2023)	25 October 1994	24 March 1997	2 years, 150 days	Gujarat	Shankar Dayal Sharma	
27	Jagdish Sharan Verma	Jagdish Sharan Verma (1933–2013)	25 March 1997	17 January 1998	298 days	Madhya Pradesh	Shankar Dayal Sharma	
28	Madan Mohan Punchhi	Madan Mohan Punchhi (1933–2015)	18 January 1998	9 October 1998	264 days	Punjab and Haryana	K. R. Narayanan	
29	Adarsh Sein Anand	Adarsh Sein Anand (1936–2017)	10 October 1998	31 October 2001	3 years, 21 days	Jammu and Kashmir	K. R. Narayanan	
30	Sam Piroj Bharucha	Sam Piroj Bharucha (born 1937)	1 November 2001	5 May 2002	185 days	Bombay	K. R. Narayanan	
31	Bhupinder Nath Kirpal	Bhupinder Nath Kirpal (born 1937)	6 May 2002	7 November 2002	185 days	Delhi	K. R. Narayanan	
32	Gopal Ballav Pattanaik	Gopal Ballav Pattanaik (born 1937)	8 November 2002	18 December 2002	40 days	Orissa	A. P. J. Abdul Kalam	
33	Vishweshwar Nath Khare	Vishweshwar Nath Khare (born 1939)	19 December 2002	1 May 2004	1 year, 134 days	Allahabad	A. P. J. Abdul Kalam	
34	S. Rajendra Babu	Sanjeevalu Rajendra Babu (born 1939)	2 May 2004	31 May 2004	29 days	Karnataka	A. P. J. Abdul Kalam	
35	Ramesh Chandra Lahoti	Ramesh Chandra Lahoti (1940–2022)	1 June 2004	31 October 2005	1 year, 152 days	Madhya Pradesh	A. P. J. Abdul Kalam	
36	Yogesh Kumar Sabharwal	Yogesh Kumar Sabharwal (1942–2015)	1 November 2005	13 January 2007	1 year, 73 days	Delhi	A. P. J. Abdul Kalam	
37	Konakuppakatil Gopinathan Balakrishnan	Konakuppakatil Gopinathan Balakrishnan (born 1945)	14 January 2007	11 May 2010	3 years, 117 days	Kerala	A. P. J. Abdul Kalam	
38	Sarosh Homi Kapadia	Sarosh Homi Kapadia (1947–2016)	12 May 2010	28 September 2012	2 years, 139 days	Bombay	Pratibha Patil	
39	Altamas Kabir	Altamas Kabir (1948–2017)	29 September 2012	18 July 2013	292 days	Calcutta	Pranab Mukherjee	
40	Palanisamy Sathasivam	Palanisamy Sathasivam (born 1949)	19 July 2013	26 April 2014	281 days	Madras	Pranab Mukherjee	
41	Rajendra Mal Lodha	Rajendra Mal Lodha (born 1949)	27 April 2014	27 September 2014	153 days	Rajasthan	Pranab Mukherjee	
42	Handyala Lakshminarayanaswamy Dattu	Handyala Lakshminarayanaswamy Dattu (born 1950)	28 September 2014	2 December 2015	1 year, 65 days	Karnataka	Pranab Mukherjee	
43	Tirath Singh Thakur	Tirath Singh Thakur (born 1952)	3 December 2015	3 January 2017	1 year, 31 days	Jammu and Kashmir	Pranab Mukherjee	
44	Jagdish Singh Khehar	Jagdish Singh Khehar (born 1952)	4 January 2017	27 August 2017	235 days	Punjab and Haryana	Pranab Mukherjee	
45	Dipak Misra	Dipak Misra (born 1953)	28 August 2017	2 October 2018	1 year, 35 days	Orissa	Ram Nath Kovind	
46	Ranjan Gogoi	Ranjan Gogoi (born 1954)	3 October 2018	17 November 2019	1 year, 45 days	Gauhati	Ram Nath Kovind	
47	Sharad Arvind Bobde	Sharad Arvind Bobde (born 1956)	18 November 2019	23 April 2021	1 year, 156 days	Bombay	Ram Nath Kovind	
48	Nuthalapati Venkata Ramana	Nuthalapati Venkata Ramana (born 1957)	24 April 2021	26 August 2022	1 year, 124 days	Andhra Pradesh	Ram Nath Kovind	
49	Uday Umesh Lalit	Uday Umesh Lalit (born 1957)	27 August 2022	8 November 2022	73 days	Bar Council	Droupadi Murmu	
50	Dhananjaya Yeshwant Chandrachud	Dhananjaya Yeshwant Chandrachud (born 1959)	9 November 2022	10 November 2024	2 years, 1 day	Bombay	Droupadi Murmu	
51	Sanjiv Khanna	Sanjiv Khanna (born 1960)	11 November 2024	13 May 2025	183 days	Delhi	Droupadi Murmu	
52	Bhushan Ramkrishna Gavai	Bhushan Ramkrishna Gavai (born 1960)	14 May 2025	23 November 2025	193 days	Bombay	Droupadi Murmu	
53	Surya Kant	Surya Kant (born 1962)	24 November 2025	Incumbent	321 days	Punjab and Haryana	Droupadi Murmu	

== See also ==
- Collegium system
- List of landmark court decisions in India
- List of sitting judges of the Supreme Court of India
- National Judicial Appointments Commission
- High courts of India
- Tribunals in India
