= Jagadish Bhalla =

Indian judge (1948-2019)

Hon'ble Chief Justice (Retd.) Jagadish Bhalla

Chairman of Uttarakhand Human Rights Commission
- In office 8 December 2016 – 30 October 2018
- Appointed by: Krishna Kant Paul
- Preceded by: Vijender Jain
- Succeeded by: Vijay Kumar Bist

Chairman of Punjab Human Rights Commission
- In office 22 March 2011 – 22 March 2016
- Appointed by: Shivraj Patil
- Preceded by: R. S. Mongia
- Succeeded by: Iqbal Ahmed Ansari

29th Chief Justice of Rajasthan High Court
- In office 10 August 2009 – 31 October 2010
- Nominated by: K. G. Balakrishnan
- Appointed by: Pratibha Patil
- Preceded by: Deepak Verma; R. C. Gandhi (acting)
- Succeeded by: Arun Kumar Mishra

19th Chief Justice of Himachal Pradesh High Court
- In office 2 February 2008 – 9 August 2009
- Nominated by: K. G. Balakrishnan
- Appointed by: Pratibha Patil
- Preceded by: Vinod Kumar Gupta
- Succeeded by: Kurian Joseph; R. B. Misra (acting)

Chief Justice of Chhattisgarh High Court
- Acting
- In office 19 May 2007 – 1 February 2008
- Appointed by: A. P. J. Abdul Kalam
- Preceded by: H. L. Dattu
- Succeeded by: Rajiv Gupta

Judge of Allahabad High Court
- In office 5 April 1995 – 18 May 2007
- Nominated by: A. M. Ahmadi
- Appointed by: S. D. Sharma

Personal details
- Born: 1 November 1948
- Died: 27 January 2019 (aged 70)
- Citizenship: Indian
- Education: LL.B and M. A.
- Alma mater: Lucknow University

Jagadish Bhalla (1 November 1948 - 27 January 2019) was an Indian judge and former Chief Justice of Himachal Pradesh and Rajasthan High Court.

== Early life ==
Bhalla's father was a doctor who was posted as Chief Medical Officer in Nainital. Bhalla completed his earlier education there. He passed M.A. and LL.B. from Lucknow University in 1971.

== Career ==
Bhalla was enrolled as an Advocate in the Bar Council of Allahabad High Court on 11 November 1971 and started practising law in the Lucknow Bench of Allahabad High Court on Constitutional, Civil, Arbitration and Criminal matters. He worked as Special Counsel on behalf of the Government of Uttar Pradesh. In 1983 he became the Standing Counsel for the State government. He was Honorary Head of the Law faculty, D.A.V. College Lucknow, Member of the Executive Council of Lucknow University and King George's Medical University. In 1995, Bhalla was appointed a Judge of Allahabad High Court. In 2007 he was transferred to Chhattisgarh High Court thereafter appointed Chief Justice of Himachal Pradesh High Court. Justice Bhalla became the Chief Justice of Rajasthan High Court on 10 August 2009. He retired on 31 October 2010 from the post. From 22 March 2011 to 22 March 2016 he served as Chairperson of Punjab State Human Rights Commission. He also served as Chairperson of Uttarakhand Human Rights Commission from December 2016 to October 2018.
