= S. R. Nayak =

Indian judge (1944–2025)

Justice Subray Rama Nayak
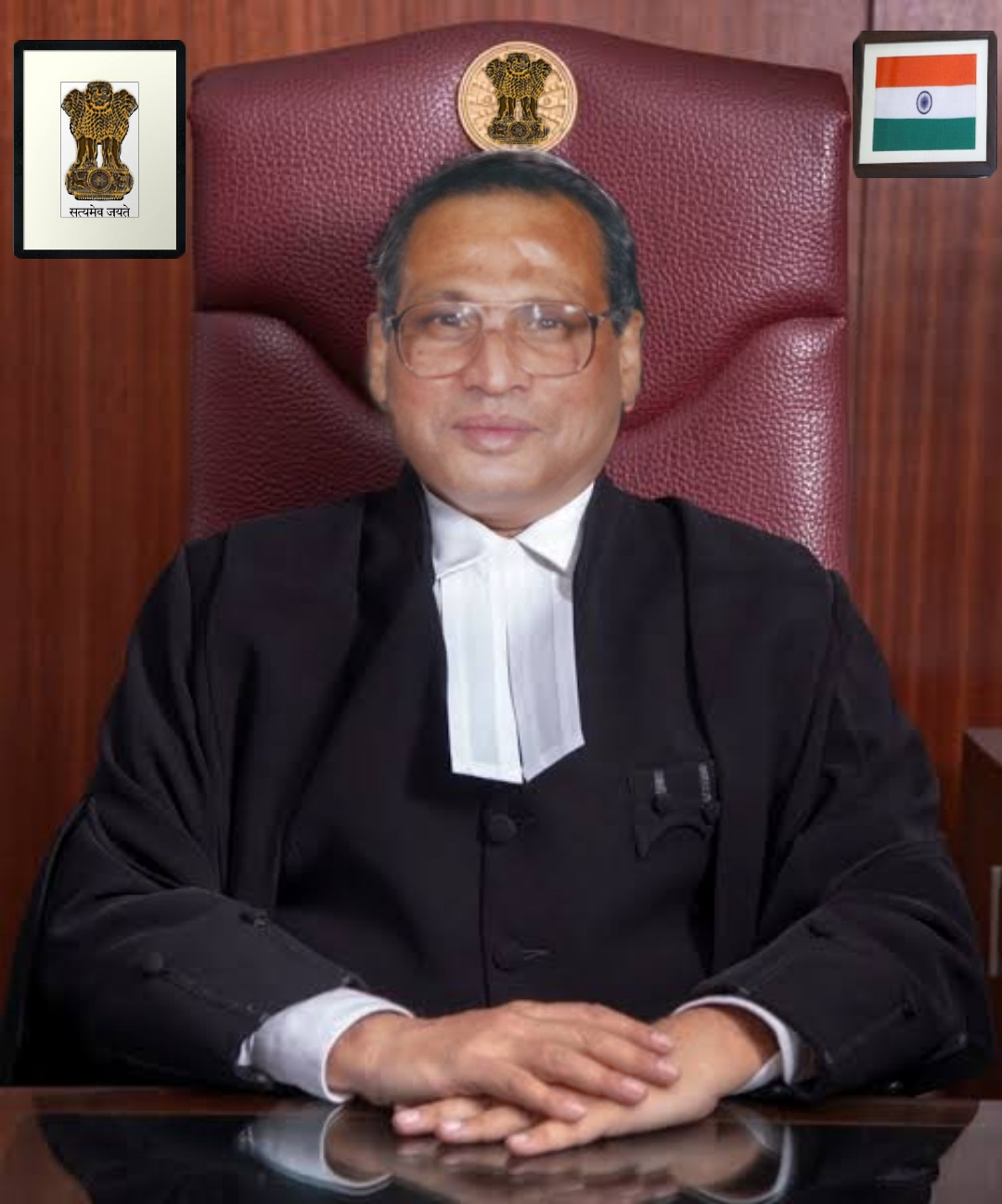

Chairman, Law Commission of Karnataka
- In office 27 June 2014 – 26 June 2019
- Appointed by: H. R. Bhardwaj

Chairperson of Karnataka Human Rights Commission
- In office 25 July 2007 – 25 July 2012
- Appointed by: T. N. Chaturvedi
- Preceded by: Office established
- Succeeded by: D. H. Waghela

5th Chief Justice of Chhattisgarh High Court
- In office 17 November 2005 – 31 December 2006
- Nominated by: R. C. Lahoti
- Appointed by: A. P. J. Abdul Kalam
- Preceded by: A. K. Pattnaik; Fakhruddin (acting)
- Succeeded by: H. L. Dattu; L. C. Bhadoo (acting)

Judge of Karnataka High Court
- In office 2 January 2003 – 17 November 2005
- Nominated by: G. B. Pattanaik
- Appointed by: A. P. J. Abdul Kalam
- Acting Chief Justice
- In office 20 October 2004 – 18 November 2004
- Appointed by: A. P. J. Abdul Kalam
- Preceded by: N. K. Jain
- Succeeded by: N. K. Sodhi

Judge of Andhra Pradesh High Court
- In office 21 March 1994 – 1 January 2003
- Nominated by: M. N. Venkatachaliah
- Appointed by: S. D. Sharma

Judge of Karnataka High Court
- In office 25 February 1994 – 20 March 1994
- Nominated by: M. N. Venkatachaliah
- Appointed by: S. D. Sharma

Personal details
- Born: 1 January 1944 Naadumaskeri, Uttara Kannada, Bombay Province, British India
- Died: 18 May 2025 (aged 81) Bengaluru, Karnataka
- Spouse: Shalini V. Kavari from Devarbhavi
- Education: LL.B and LL.M
- Occupation: Chief Justice of High Courts

Subray Rama Nayak (1 January 1944 – 18 May 2025) was an Indian judge who served as the chief justice of Chhattisgarh High Court from 17 November 2005 to 31 December 2006.

== Early life ==
Nayak was born in what is now the Uttara Kannada district Naadumaskeri village into an agriculturist family of the Nadavaru caste. His mother Nagamma Rama Nayak and father Rama Ranga Nayak along with other families from Ankola region were imprisoned by the British Government for participating in the Quit India Movement, a part of the freedom struggle of India.

== Education ==
Nayak completed his primary education in his native place and high school in Janata Vidyalaya, Dandeli. He received a B.Sc. degree and a LL.B. degree from Mysore University, and LL.M. degree from Bangalore University. Nayak was a part-time lecturer of law from 1975 until he was elevated to the bench. He taught at B.M.S. College of Law, Basavanagudi, Bangalore, and S.L.S.R.C., Havanur College of Law, Bangalore.

== As judge ==
He was elevated to the high court of Karnataka state, India, on 25 February 1994, and subsequently sworn in as judge of the high court of Andhra Pradesh state, India, on 21 March 1994. He was transferred back to Karnataka High Court and was sworn in as a Judge of Karnataka High Court on 2 January 2003. He was the acting chief justice of Karnataka High Court from 20 October 2004 to 18 November 2004.

Nayak assumed charge of the office of chief justice of the high court of Chhattisgarh at Bilaspur on 17 November 2005. He retired on 1 January 2007.

After his retirement as chief justice, Nayak had two politically appointed positions under the Congress rule in Karnataka. Justice Nayak was appointed the first Chairman of the newly formed Karnataka State Human Rights Commission from 2007 to 2012 and chairman of the Law Commission of Karnataka in June 2014 till June 2019.

== Death ==
Nayak died in Bengaluru on 18 May 2025, at the age of 81.

== Awards ==
The Kannada University at Hampi conferred on him the Naadoja award, The Bangalore University conferred on him the honorary doctorate (laws) in May 2009 and Other Awards.

== Photo gallery ==
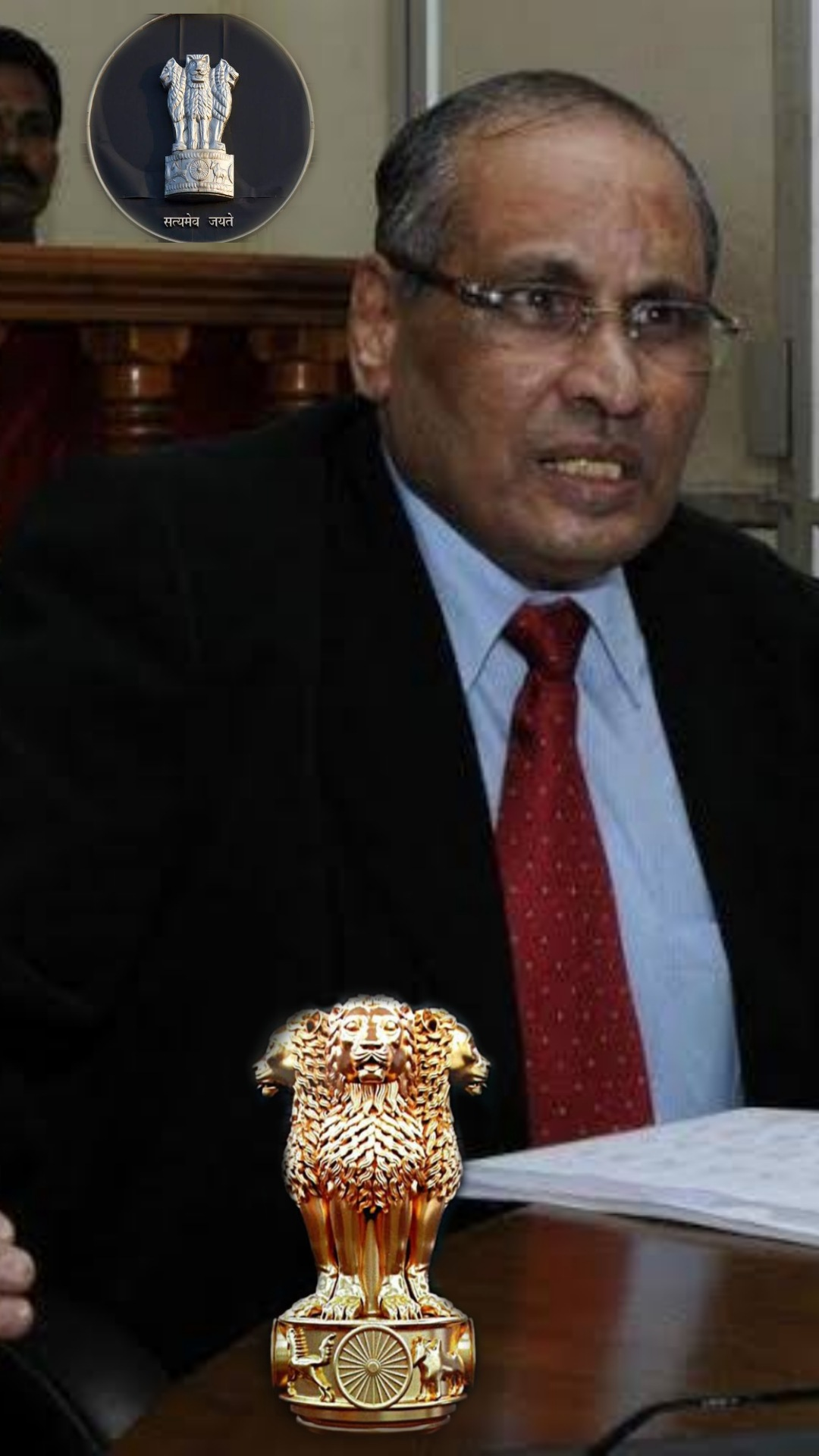

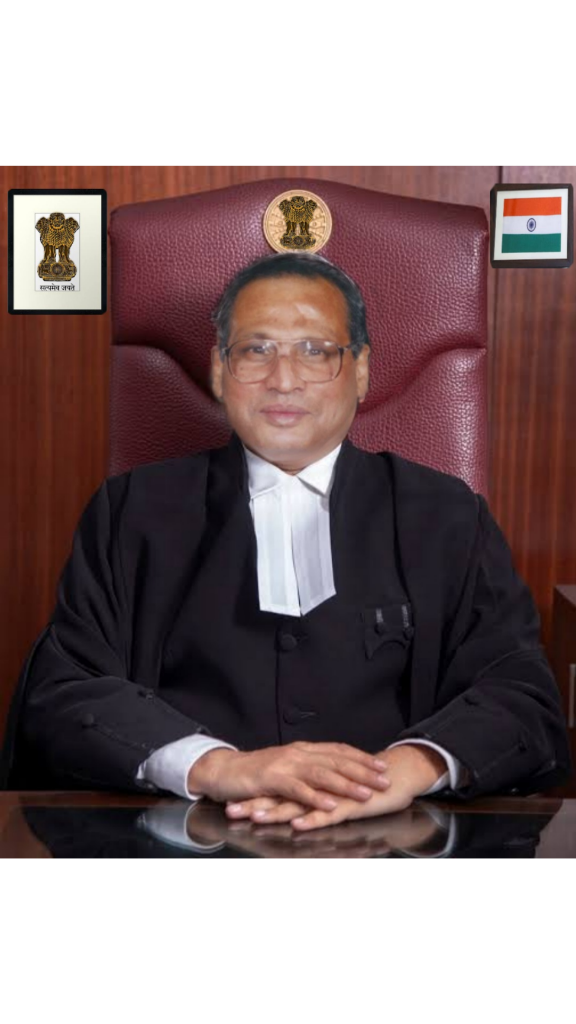
Justice Dr. S. R. Nayak

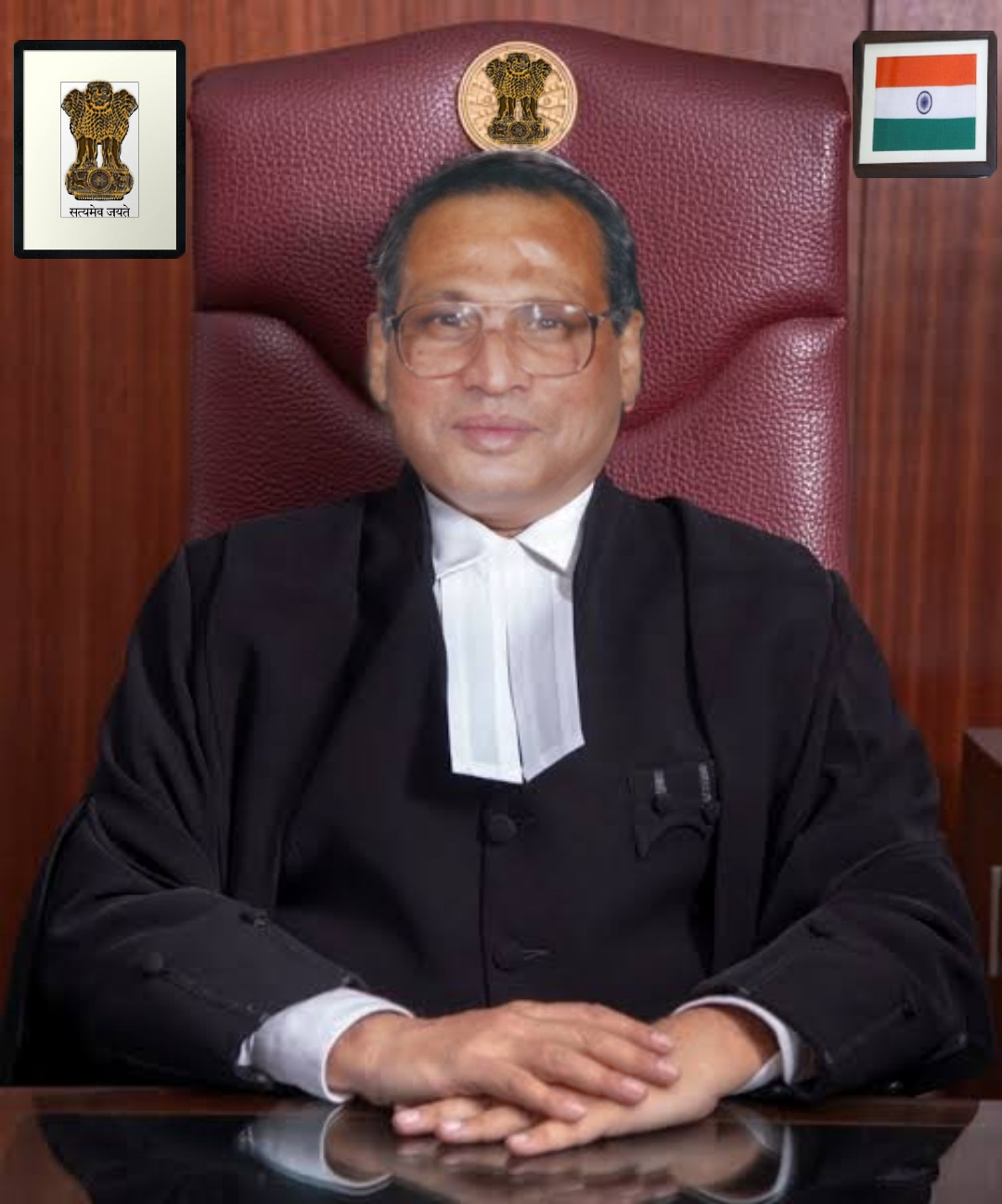

== Sources ==
- Judicial Activism or Judicial Tyranny, S. R. Nayak Former Chief Justice, High Court of Chhattisgarh
