= Cyriac Joseph =

Indian judge (born 1947)

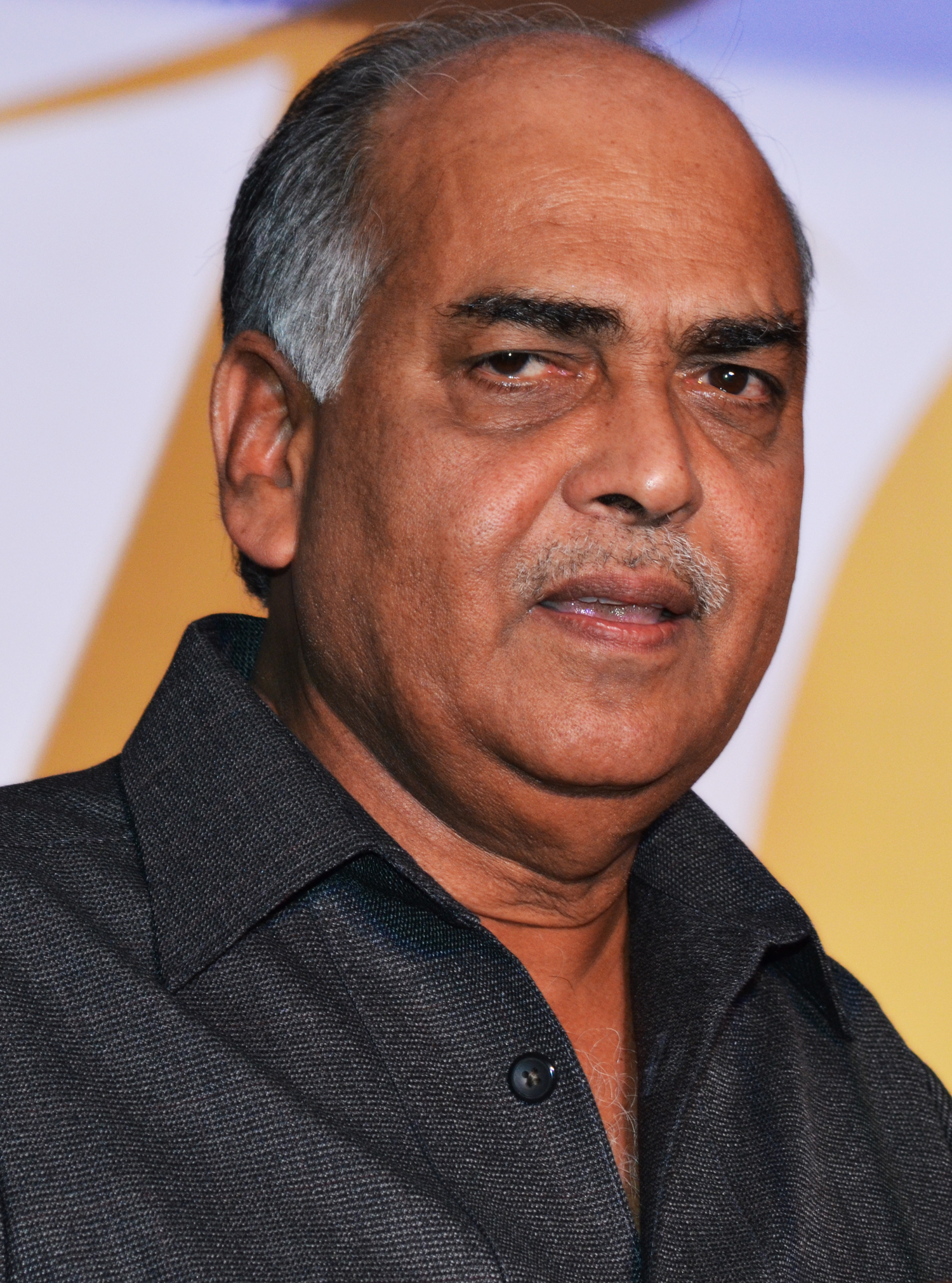

Member of National Human Rights Commission of India
- In office 27 May 2013 – 28 January 2017
- Appointed by: Pranab Mukherjee
- Chairperson: K. G. Balakrishnan
- Acting Chairperson
- In office 11 May 2015 – 28 February 2016
- Preceded by: K. G. Balakrishnan
- Succeeded by: H. L. Dattu

Judge of Supreme Court of India
- In office 7 July 2008 – 27 January 2012
- Nominated by: K. G. Balakrishnan
- Appointed by: Pratibha Patil

23rd Chief Justice of Karnataka High Court
- In office 7 January 2006 – 6 July 2008
- Nominated by: Y. K. Sabharwal
- Appointed by: A. P. J. Abdul Kalam
- Preceded by: N. K. Sodhi; B. Padmaraj (acting)
- Succeeded by: P. D. Dinakaran; Deepak Verma (acting)

4th Chief Justice of Uttarakhand High Court
- In office 20 March 2005 – 6 January 2006
- Nominated by: R. C. Lahoti
- Appointed by: A. P. J. Abdul Kalam
- Preceded by: V. S. Sirpurkar
- Succeeded by: Rajiv Gupta; Prakash Chandra Verma (acting)

Judge of Kerala High Court
- In office 24 September 2001 – 19 March 2005
- Nominated by: A. S. Anand
- Appointed by: K. R. Narayanan
- Acting Chief Justice
- In office 2 March 2005 – 18 March 2005
- Appointed by: A. P. J. Abdul Kalam
- Preceded by: B. Subhashan Reddy
- Succeeded by: Rajiv Gupta; K. S. Radhakrishnan (acting)
- In office 18 November 2004 – 20 November 2004
- Appointed by: A. P. J. Abdul Kalam
- Preceded by: N. K. Sodhi
- Succeeded by: B. Subhashan Reddy
- In office 2 October 2002 – 1 November 2002
- Appointed by: A. P. J. Abdul Kalam
- Preceded by: B. N. Srikrishna
- Succeeded by: Jawahar Lal Gupta

Judge of Delhi High Court
- In office 5 August 1994 – 23 September 2001
- Nominated by: M. N. Venkatachaliah
- Appointed by: S. D. Sharma

Judge of Kerala High Court
- In office 6 July 1994 – 4 August 1994
- Nominated by: M. N. Venkatachaliah
- Appointed by: S. D. Sharma

Personal details
- Born: 28 January 1947 (age 79) Kaipuzha, Kottayam
- Spouse: Smt. Biby
- Children: Four
- Education: B.Sc. & B.L.
- Alma mater: Government Law College, Thiruvananthapuram; St. Berchmans College Changanacherry

Cyriac Joseph (born 28 January 1947) is a retired judge of the Supreme Court of India, who served from 7 July 2008 to 27 January 2012.

== Early life ==
Joseph was born in Kaipuzha, Kottayam Kerala on 28 January 1947. He completed his education from Kaipuzha St. Margarette's U.P.School, Kaipuzha St. George's High School, Palai St Thomas College, St. Berchmans College Changanacherry and Trivandrum Government Law College. His marriage was held in Collective Wedding (Samooha vivaham) conducted by Knanaya Community, in which he was a leader, to give message to community to reduce marriage extravagances.

== Career ==
He started his career in advocacy on 12 October 1968 and started practicing in District Court Kottayam and then shifted to Kerala High Court at Ernakulam. He served as Government Pleader in Kerala High Court from 1976 to 1979, as Senior Government Pleader in Kerala High Court from 1979 to 1987, as Additional Advocate General of Kerala State from 6 July 1991 to 5 July 1994. He was appointed permanent judge of Kerala High Court on 6 July 1994. Thereafter, on 5 August 1994 he has been transferred to Delhi High Court and transferred back to Kerala High Court on 24 September 2001. He was the Chief Justice of Uttarakhand High Court and Karnataka High Court.

He became a judge of Supreme Court of India on 7 July 2008 and served until 27 January 2012. After retirement, he was supposed to have been nominated as the Chairman of the Telecom Disputes Settlement and Appellate Tribunal (TDSAT). That appointment was put on hold following Telecom Minister Kapil Sibal's reservations about the appointment since the judge had been criticised for his style of functioning by an intelligence agency of the government. Subsequently, the government has been trying to appoint him as a member of the National Human Rights Commission but the opposition BJP has been staunchly opposed to the idea. The Sunday Guardian reported that Justice Joseph delivered only 10 judgements during his tenure of 1300 days.
