= Mulea campaign =

MULEA (Magadh University Late Exam Aandolan) was a social media campaign primarily on YouTube and Twitter.

It was started as the students were fed up by the Magadh University, the lethargy of the Government of Bihar and the Central Government's non-intervention in the matters of the youth.

Prior to beginning the campaign, the students visited every high offices of the state ranging from the Governor, the Chief Minister, to the Bihar Human Rights Commission.

They were also denied to hold a peaceful protest by the administration citing the Model Code of Conduct in place for the 2019 Indian general election.

== Relevance of the Campaign ==
Due to the pressure of the campaign the university started taking exams in the month of May, 2019. when the Model Code of Conduct was in place due to Lok Sabha election citing which the university had postponed the already delayed exams. Subsequently, it also conducted the Traditional courses exams of 2016–19 session in the month of June 2019. Further, it also conducted the first year exam of UG 2017–20 sessions which was running by two year late.

Further, taking into account the lackadaisical approach of the University the then Governor of Bihar Lalji Tandon removed the exam controller and some other officers of the university. Subsequently, the Pro Vice Chancellor of the University also had to resign.

== Aftermath of the campaign ==
Netizens across the world voiced their support by sending videos. The campaign went nearly viral on social media. As a result, #mulea also trended on Twitter. Their lives are at dark. They have called themselves Zombies in a YouTube video.
