= Tarun Chatterjee =

Indian judge (1945–2023)

Judge of the Supreme Court of India
- In office 27 August 2004 – 14 January 2010
- Nominated by: S. Rajendra Babu
- Appointed by: A. P. J. Abdul Kalam

38th Chief Justice of the Allahabad High Court
- In office 31 January 2003 – 26 August 2004
- Nominated by: V. N. Khare
- Appointed by: A. P. J. Abdul Kalam
- Preceded by: Shyamal Kumar Sen
- Succeeded by: Ajoy Nath Ray

Judge of the Calcutta High Court
- In office 6 August 1990 – 30 January 2003
- Nominated by: Sabyasachi Mukharji
- Appointed by: R. Venkataraman

Personal details
- Born: Tarun Chatterjee; 14 January 1945 Maliara, Bankura district, Bengal Province, British India (now West Bengal, India)
- Died: 8 July 2023 (aged 78)
- Spouse: Kumkum Chatterjee
- Relations: Digambar Chatterjee (great grandfather); Sumitra Devi (aunt) (Note: Digambar Chatterjee was the brother of Pitambar Chattterjee, the grandfather of Indian actress Sumitra Devi.)
- Parent: Purshottam Chatterjee (father)
- Later work(s): Chairman, Uttar Pradesh Human Rights Commission

Tarun Chatterjee (14 January 1945 – 8 July 2023) was an Indian judge. He served as a justice of the Supreme Court of India and chairman of the Uttar Pradesh Human Rights Commission.

== Early life ==
Chatterjee was the son of Purshottam Chatterjee, a former judge of the Calcutta High Court. His grandfather Digambar Chatterjee was also a judge of the Calcutta High Court in British India. Chatterjee married Kumkum Chatterjee. Their son Aniruddha Chatterjee is a practicing advocate of Calcutta High Court.

== Career ==
Chatterjee obtained a Bachelor of Science, Bachelor of Laws, and enrolled as an advocate in 1970. He started practice in the Calcutta High Court in Civil, Criminal and Constitutional matters. He became the permanent judge in the same high court on 6 August 1990. In 2003 he was appointed chief justice of the Allahabad High Court. Chatterjee was elevated to the post of judge of the Supreme Court of India on 27 August 2004. He retired on 14 January 2010. After retirement he became chairman of the Uttar Pradesh Human Rights Commission.

== Controversy ==
In 2010, Central Bureau of Investigation investigated the fraudulent withdrawal of Rs 6.58 crore from the provident fund accounts of class III and IV employees in the Ghaziabad district court, implicating members of higher judiciary, including Chatterjee. The report submitted by the Central Bureau of Investigation officials was examined by a bench comprising justices D. K. Jain, V. S. Sirpurkar, and G. S. Singhvi. Chatterjee denied the allegations.

== Personal life and death ==
Chatterjee married Kumkum Chatterjee. Their son Aniruddha Chatterjee is a practicing advocate of the Calcutta High Court. Chatterjee died on 8 July 2023, at the age of 78.

== Bibliography ==
- Patel, Baburao (March 1949). Film India.
