= National Human Rights Commission of India =

Indian government agency in charge of protecting human rights

National Human Rights Commission राष्ट्रीय मानव अधिकार आयोग
- Motto: Sarve Bhavantu Sukhinaḥ (transl. "May All be Happy")

Agency overview
- Formed: 12 October 1993 (33 years ago)
- Annual budget: ₹7,553 crore (US$810 million) (in 2024–2025 budget)

Jurisdictional structure
- Federal agency (Operations jurisdiction): India
- Operations jurisdiction: India
- Map of National Human Rights Commission's jurisdiction
- Area: 3,287,263 km^{2} (1,269,219 sq mi)
- Population: 1,428,627,663
- Legal jurisdiction: India
- Constituting instrument: Protection of Human Rights Act, 1993
- General nature: Federal law enforcement

Operational structure
- Headquarters: Manav Adhikar Bhavan, Block-C, GPO Complex, INA, New Delhi - 110 023.
- Agency executives: Justice V. Ramasubramanian, Chairman; Piyush Goyal, Secretary General
- Child agencies: Andhra Pradesh State Human Rights Commission; Arunachal Pradesh State Human Rights Commission; Assam Human Rights Commission; Bihar Human Rights Commission; Chhattisgarh Human Rights Commission; Goa Human Rights Commission; Gujarat State Human Rights Commission; Haryana State Human Rights Commission; Himachal Pradesh State Human Rights Commission; Jharkhand Human Rights Commission; Karnataka State Human Rights Commission; Kerala State Human Rights Commission; Madhya Pradesh Human Rights Commission; Maharashtra State Human Rights Commission; Manipur State Human Rights Commission; Meghalaya State Human Rights Commission; Mizoram State Human Rights Commission; Nagaland State Human Rights Commission; Odisha Human Rights Commission; Punjab State Human Rights Commission; Rajasthan State Human Rights Commission; Sikkim State Human Rights Commission; Tamil Nadu Human Rights Commission; Telangana State Human Rights Commission; Tripura State Human Rights Commission; Uttar Pradesh Human Rights Commission; Uttarakhand Human Rights Commission; West Bengal Human Rights Commission

Notables
- Anniversary: 12 October

Website
- https://nhrc.nic.in/

The National Human Rights Commission of India (NHRC) is a statutory body constituted on 12 October 1993 under the Protection of Human Rights Ordinance of 28 September 1993. It was given a statutory basis by the Protection of Human Rights Act, 1993 (PHRA). The NHRC is responsible for the protection and promotion of human rights, which are defined by the act as "rights relating to life, liberty, equality and dignity of the individual guaranteed by the Constitution or embodied in the International Covenants and enforceable by courts in India".

== Functions of NHRC ==
The Protection of Human Rights Act mandates the NHRC to perform the following:

- Proactively or reactively inquire into violations of human rights by the government of India or negligence of such violation by a public servant
- The protection of human rights and recommend measures for their effective implementation
- Review the factors, including acts of terrorism that inhibit the enjoyment of human rights and recommend appropriate remedial measures
- To study treaties and other international instruments on human rights and make recommendations for their effective implementation
- Undertake and promote research in the field of human rights
- To visit jails and study the condition of inmates
- Engage in human rights education among various sections of society and promote awareness of the safeguards available for the protection of these rights through publications, the media, seminars and other available means
- Encourage the efforts of NGOs and institutions that work in the field of human rights voluntarily.
- Considering the necessity for the protection of human rights.
- Requisitioning any public record or copy thereof from any court or office.

== Composition ==
The NHRC consists of the chairperson and five members (excluding the ex-officio members)

- A Chairperson, who has been a Chief Justice of India or a Judge of the Supreme Court.
- One member who is, or has been, a judge of the Supreme Court of India and one member who is, or has been, the Chief Justice of a High Court.
- Three Members, out of which at least one shall be a woman to be appointed from amongst persons having knowledge of, or practical experience in, matters relating to human rights.
- In addition, the Chairpersons of National Commissions viz., National Commission for Scheduled Castes, National Commission for Scheduled Tribes, National Commission for Women, National Commission for Minorities, National Commission for Backward Classes, National Commission for Protection of Child Rights; and the Chief Commissioner for Persons with Disabilities serve as ex officio members.

A serving judge of the Supreme Court or incumbent Chief Justice of any High Court can be appointed only after the consultation with the Chief Justice of India.

=== Chairman and members ===
Justice V. Ramasubramanian is the current chairperson of the commission, serving since 23 December 2024 onwards.

The other members are:

- Dr. Justice Bidyut Ranjan Sarangi - Member
- Smt Vijaya Bharathi Sayani - Member
- Shri Priyank Kanoongo - Member

Ex-officio members:

- Chairperson, National Commission for Scheduled Castes
- Chairperson, National Commission for Scheduled Tribes
- Chairperson, National Commission for Minorities
- Chairperson, National Commission for Women
- Chairperson, National Commission for Backward Classes
- Chairperson, National Commission for Protection of Child Rights
- Chief Commissioner for Persons with Disabilities

=== Core Groups ===
- Core Group on Older Persons
- Core Advisory Group on Environment, Climate Change & Human Rights
- Core Group on Human Rights Defenders and NGOs
- Core Advisory Group on Bonded Labour
- Core group on LGBTI issues
- Core Advisory Group on Business and Human Rights
- Core Group on Disabilities
- Core group on Health and Mental Health
- Core Group on Right to Food
- Core Group on Rights of Women
- Core Group of NGOs in the Commission
- Core Advisory Group on Criminal Justice System Reforms
- Core Group on Mental Health in the Commission Order

== State Human Rights Commission ==
A state government may constitute a body known as the Human Rights Commission of that State to exercise the powers conferred upon and to perform the functions assigned to a State Commission. In accordance with the amendment brought in TPHRA, 1993 point No.10 below is the list of State Human Rights Commissions formed to perform the functions of the commission as stated under chapter V of TPHRA, 1993 (with amendment act 2006). At present, 25 states have constituted SHRC

State Commission	City	Date constituted
Assam Human Rights Commission	Guwahati	19 January 1996
Andhra Pradesh State Human Rights Commission	Kurnool	2 August 2006
Bihar Human Rights Commission	Patna	3 January 2000
Chhattisgarh Human Rights Commission	Raipur	16 April 2001
Gujarat State Human Rights Commission	Gandhinagar	12 September 2006
Goa Human Rights Commission	Panaji	2011
Meghalaya State Human Rights Commission	Shillong	July 2016
Himachal Pradesh State Human Rights Commission	Shimla	--
Kerala State Human Rights Commission	Thiruvananthapuram	11 December 1998
Karnataka State Human Rights Commission	Bangalore	28 June 2005
Madhya Pradesh Human Rights Commission	Bhopal	1 September 1995
Maharashtra State Human Rights Commission	Mumbai	6 March 2001
Manipur State Human Rights Commission	Imphal	2003
Nagaland State Human Rights Commission	Kohima	--
Odisha Human Rights Commission	Bhubaneswar	27 January 2000
Punjab State Human Rights Commission	Chandigarh	17 March 1997
Rajasthan State Human Rights Commission	Jaipur	18 January 1999
State Human Rights Commission Tamil Nadu	Chennai	17 April 1997
Uttar Pradesh Human Rights Commission	Lucknow	7 October 2002
West Bengal Human Rights Commission	Kolkata	8 January 1994
Jharkhand State Human Rights Commission	Ranchi	2010
Sikkim State Human Rights Commission	Gangtok	18 October 2008
Uttarakhand Human Rights Commission	Dehradun	13 May 2013
Haryana Human Rights Commission	Chandigarh	2012
Tripura Human Rights Commission	Agartala	2015
Telangana State Human Rights Commission	Hyderabad	2019

== Appointment ==
Sections 2, 3 and 4 of TPHRA lay down the rules for appointment to the NHRC. The chairperson and members of the NHRC are appointed by the President of India, on the recommendation of a committee consisting of:

- The Prime Minister (chairperson)
- The Home Minister
- The Leader of the Opposition in the Lok Sabha (Lower House)
- The Leader of the Opposition in the Rajya Sabha (Upper House)
- The Speaker of the Lok Sabha (Lower House)
- The Deputy Chairman of the Rajya Sabha (Upper House)

== List of Chairpersons of the National Human Rights Commission of India ==
Sr. No.	Portrait	Name	Tenure	
1.		Justice Ranganath Misra	12 October 1993	24 November 1996
2.		Justice M N Venkatachaliah	26 November 1996	24 October 1999
3.		Justice J S Verma	4 November 1999	17 January 2003
4.		Justice A S Anand	17 February 2003	31 October 2006
-		Justice Shivaraj Patil (Acting)	1 November 2006	1 April 2007
5.		Justice S. Rajendra Babu	2 April 2007	31 May 2009
-		Justice G. P. Mathur (Acting)	1 June 2009	6 June 2010
6.		Justice K G Balakrishnan	7 June 2010	11 May 2015
-		Justice Cyriac Joseph (Acting)	11 May 2015	28 February 2016
7.		Justice H.L. Dattu	29 February 2016	2 December 2020
–		Justice Prafulla Chandra Pant (Acting)	25 April 2021	1 June 2021
8.		Justice Arun Kumar Mishra	2 June 2021	1 June 2024
_		Vijaya Bharathi Sayani (Acting)	2 June 2024	30 December 2024
9.		Justice V. Ramasubramanian	30 December 2024	Incumbent

== Controversy ==
A report concerning how the Shivani Bhatnagar murder case was rejected, a case involving high-ranking officials, opened the organisation up to questioning over the usefulness of human rights commissions set up by the government at the national and state levels. In mid-2011, the chairman of the NHRC, ex-Chief Justice K.G. Balakrishnan came under a cloud for allegedly owning assets disproportionate to his income. His son-in-law P. V. Srinijan, an Indian National Congress politician, had to resign for suddenly coming into possession of land worth Rs. 25 lakhs. Many prominent jurists, including former CJ J. S. Verma, SC ex-Judge V. R. Krishna Iyer, noted jurist Fali S. Nariman, former NHRC member Sudarshan Agrawal and prominent activist lawyer Prashant Bhushan, have called on Balakrishnan's resignation pending from the NHRC pending inquiry. In February 2012, the Supreme Court of India inquired of the government regarding the status of the inquiry.

The National Human Rights Commission of India (NHRC) had its accreditation with the U.N recognised Global Alliance of National Human Rights Institutions (GANHRI) deferred for a second consecutive year in 2024, due to concerns regarding its compliance with the Paris Principles. The deferral was attributed to issues such as a lack of transparency in the appointment of NHRC members, the inclusion of police officers in human rights investigations, and inadequate gender and minority representation within the commission’s composition and political meddling.

== Human Rights Campaign's recommendations ==
The NHRC held that 16 out of 19 police encounters with suspected Maoists in Guntur and Kurnool districts of Andhra Pradesh, prior to 2002, were fake and recommended the Government payment of compensation of ₹5 lakh each to the kin of the families.
