= Rajiv Gupta (judge) =

Hon'ble Chief Justice (Retd.) Rajiv Gupta
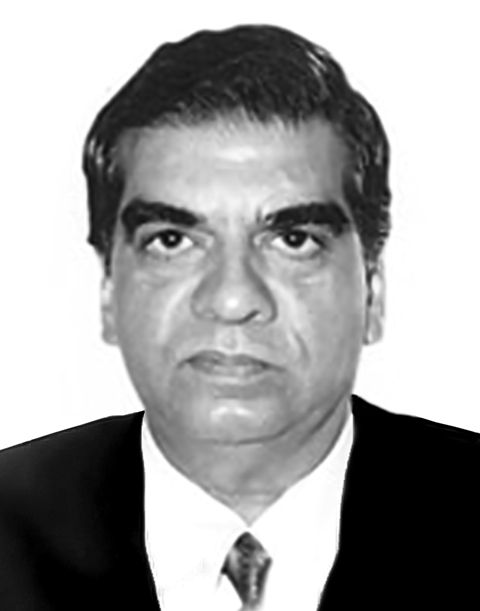

Chairman of Chhattisgarh Human Rights Commission
- In office 19 November 2012 – 19 November 2017
- Appointed by: Shekhar Dutt
- Preceded by: Y. K. S. Thakur
- Succeeded by: Mahendra Pal Singhal

7th Chief Justice of Chhattisgarh High Court
- In office 2 February 2008 – 9 October 2012
- Nominated by: K. G. Balakrishnan
- Appointed by: Pratibha Patil
- Preceded by: H. L. Dattu; Jagadish Bhalla (acting)
- Succeeded by: Yatindra Singh; A. M. Sapre (acting)

5th Chief Justice of Uttarakhand High Court
- In office 14 January 2006 – 1 February 2008
- Nominated by: Y. K. Sabharwal
- Appointed by: A. P. J. Abdul Kalam
- Preceded by: Cyriac Joseph; Prakash Chandra Verma (acting)
- Succeeded by: Vinod Kumar Gupta

25th Chief Justice of Kerala High Court
- In office 27 April 2005 – 13 January 2006
- Nominated by: R. C. Lahoti
- Appointed by: A. P. J. Abdul Kalam
- Preceded by: B. Subhashan Reddy; Cyriac Joseph (acting); K. S. Radhakrishnan (acting)
- Succeeded by: V. K. Bali; K. S. Radhakrishnan (acting)

Judge of Madhya Pradesh High Court
- In office 27 September 1994 – 26 April 2005
- Nominated by: M. N. Venkatachaliah
- Appointed by: S. D. Sharma
- Acting Chief Justice
- In office 13 March 2004 – 7 July 2004
- Appointed by: A. P. J. Abdul Kalam
- Preceded by: Kumar Rajarathnam
- Succeeded by: R. V. Raveendran
- In office 24 August 2003 – 5 September 2003
- Appointed by: A. P. J. Abdul Kalam
- Preceded by: Bhawani Singh
- Succeeded by: Kumar Rajarathnam

Personal details
- Born: 10 October 1950 (age 76) Gwalior, Madhya Bharat, India
- Citizenship: Indian
- Education: B.A. and LL.B
- Alma mater: Jiwaji University
- Website: hrc.cg.gov.in

Rajiv Gupta (born 10 October 1950) is a retired Indian judge who is former chairman of the Chhattisgarh Human Rights Commission and former Chief Justice of the High Courts of Chhattisgarh, Uttarakhand and Kerala.

== Early life and education ==
Justice Gupta was born at Gwalior in Madhya Pradesh on 10 October 1950. He completed his LL.B. from Jiwaji University, Gwalior.

== Career ==
Rajiv Gupta started practice in Madhya Pradesh High Court in November 1973 and continued to practise there till 1994. He was appointed Judge of the Madhya Pradesh High Court on 27 September 1994. He also served as acting chief justice of Madhya Pradesh High court in 2003 and 2004.

He assumed charge as Chief Justice of Kerala High Court on 27 April 2005. He was then transferred to High Court of Uttarakhand at Nainital and he assumed charge on 14 January 2006. Later on he was transferred to Chhattisgarh High Court on 2 February 2008. He replaced Justice Jagdish Bhalla, who has been transferred to Himachal Pradesh High Court. In October 2012, he was appointed the Chairman of the Chhattisgarh Human Rights Commission and served there till 19 November 2017.
