= Nauvdip Kumar Sodhi =

Indian judge (1943–2021)

Justice N. K. Sodhi

Presiding Officer of Securities Appellate Tribunal
- In office 21 December 2005 – 28 November 2011
- Preceded by: Kumar Rajarathnam
- Succeeded by: J.P. Devadhar

Chief Justice of Kerala High Court
- In office 19 November 2004 – 29 November 2005
- Preceded by: Nagendra Kumar Jain
- Succeeded by: Cyriac Joseph

Chief Justice of Karnataka High Court
- In office 5 April 2004 – 17 November 2004
- Preceded by: Jawahar Lal Gupta
- Succeeded by: B. Subhashan Reddy

Judge of Punjab and Haryana High Court
- In office March 1991 – January 2004

Personal details
- Born: 29 November 1943
- Died: 28 December 2021 (aged 78) Chandigarh
- Cause of death: COVID-19
- Citizenship: Indian
- Spouse: Neelam Sodhi

Nauvdip Kumar Sodhi was an Indian judge who served as Chief Justice of the Kerala and Karnataka High Courts. After his retirement as judge he was appointed the Presiding Officer of the Securities Appellate Tribunal.

== Career ==
Sodhi graduated in law from Panjab University in 1965 and started practicing as an advocate in civil, constitutional, labour, tax, transport and corporate laws in Chandigarh. He also served as editor of the Indian Law Reports (Punjab and Haryana series) and was a part-time law faculty at the Panjab University. In March 1991 he was elevated as Judge of the Punjab and Haryana High Court, later transferred to Kerala High Court where he served as acting Chief Justice and became Chief Justice of the Kerala High Court and was transferred to Karnataka as Chief Justice from where Justice Sodhi demitted his office upon attaining age of superannuation on 29 November 2005. After retirement he was appointed as the Presiding Officer of the Securities Appellate Tribunal at Mumbai, for a period of six years.

== Death ==
After he contracted COVID-19, he developed acute respiratory distress syndrome and was moved to the Post Graduate Institute of Medical Education and Research in Chandigarh. He succumbed to COVID-19, on 28 December 2021, at the age of 78.
