= Jharkhand Human Rights Commission =

Jurisdictional structure
- Federal agency: India
- Operations jurisdiction: India
- General nature: Federal law enforcement

Operational structure
- Headquarters: TOWN ADMINISTRATIVE BUILDING, NEAR GOLCHAKAR, DHURWA, RANCHI-834004.
- Agency executive: Santosh Kumar Satpathy, Chairman

Website
- Official website

Jharkhand Human Rights Commission is a statutory organisation created as per "The Protection of Human Rights Act of 1993 for India" for the state of Jharkhand to inquire into human rights violations for subjects referred in the state list and concurrent list mentioned in the seventh schedule of the constitution of India. The Chairman and other members of the Jharkhand Human Rights Commission are appointed by The Governor of the state on the recommendations of a committee having the Chief Minister of the state as its head, and other members include, Legislative Assembly speaker of the state, home minister in State Government and the leader of the opposition in the state Legislative Assembly. In the states having legislative council, The chairman of legislative council and the leader of the opposition of legislative council would also be the members forming part of the committee.

== History and Objective ==
Jharkhand Human Rights Commission was created as per the Protection of Human Rights Act of 1993 with provisions to inquire into violation of human rights related to concurrent list in the seventh schedule of the Indian constitution and subjects covered under Himachal state list.

Jharkhand Human Rights Commission office is situated in TOWN ADMINISTRATIVE BUILDING, NEAR GOLCHAKAR, DHURWA RANCHI-834004.

== Composition ==
Jharkhand Human Rights Commission as per Human Rights (Amendment) Act, 2006 should consist of at least three members including a chairperson, who should be a retired Chief Justice of any Indian High Court.

The other members should be:

(i) A serving or retired judge of a High Court or a District Judge in the state with a minimum of seven years experience as District judge.

(ii) A person having practical experience or knowledge related to human rights.

Jharkhand State Human Rights Commission chairperson and other members are appointed by The Governor of the state on the recommendations of a committee having the Chief Minister of the state as its head, and other members include, Legislative Assembly speaker of the state, home minister in State Government and the leader of the opposition in the state Legislative Assembly. In the states having legislative council, The chairman of legislative council and the leader of the opposition of legislative council would also be the members forming part of the committee.

The term of the chairperson and members of the commission is fixed for five years or until attainment of the age of 70 years, whichever is earlier. The members including chairman will not be eligible to take up any employment under the state government or the central government after the completion of their term in the commission, excluding the eligibility for another term in the commission subject to the attainment of the prescribed age limit.

Justice Shri Santosh Kumar Satpathy is the current Chairman of Himachal Pradesh Human Rights Commission.

== Functions ==
Jharkhand Human Rights Commission is created with below functions, according to the protection of Human Rights Act, 1993:

- Inquire either on a petition presented to it, by a victim, or suo motu or by any person or on his behalf into complaints of human rights violation or violation by a public servant due to negligence in the prevention of such offences.
- Make visits to any jail or other places of detention of people, which is under the control of the State Government and observe the living conditions of the inmates and make recommendations for improvement, if any.
- Recommend appropriate remedial measures after reviewing the factors, which prevents the enjoyment of human rights through any actions including acts of terrorism.
- The commission should encourage the efforts of Non-Governmental organizations or any other institutions working in the field of human rights development.
- In case of allegations of violation of human rights before a Court, the commission should intervene in the proceedings involved with the approval from Court.
- Commission should Undertake and promote research in the area of human rights.
- Commission should make efforts to promote awareness of the various safeguards available for the protection of human rights and spread human rights literacy among general public .
- Commission should also review the provision of safeguards relating to protection of human rights under the constitution of any law which is in force for time being and recommend measures for their effective implementation.
- For the promotion of human rights, commission may undertake such other functions as it may consider necessary.

Goa State Human Rights Commission has below powers:

• Powers to regulate its own procedure.

• All the powers of a civil court and with its proceedings being judicial.

• Call for details of information or report from the state government or any other authority subordinate to them.

• Powers to require any person who is subject to any privilege which may be claimed under any law for the time being in force, to furnish information on points or matters useful for, or relevant to the subject matter of inquiry.

• The commission can look into a matter within one year of its occurrence.

== Limitations ==
Jharkhand Human Rights Commission has limited powers and functions as they are subject to only advising, and does not have power to punish the violators of human rights or award any relief including monetary, to the victim.

The recommendations of Goa State Human Rights Commission are not binding on the state government or authority, except that the commission should be informed about the action taken by the state government on its recommendation within one month from the date of complaint.

== See also ==
National Human Commission of India
