= West Bengal Human Rights Commission =

West Bengal Human Rights Commission পশ্চিমবঙ্গ মানব অধিকার আয়োগ

Agency overview
- Formed: 31 January 1995; 31 years ago (Notification: No. 42 & 180 HS/HRC)
- Preceding agency: National Human Rights Commission of India

Jurisdictional structure
- Federal agency: India
- Operations jurisdiction: India
- Area: 88,752 km^{2} (34,267 sq mi)
- Population: 91,347,736 (2011)
- General nature: Federal law enforcement

Operational structure
- Headquarters: Kolkata, West Bengal
- Agency executives: Justice Indra Prasanna Mukerji, Chairperson; Justice Madhumati Mitra, Mr Basudeb Banerji

Website
- Official website

The West Bengal Human Rights Commission is a statutory body dedicated to protecting and promoting human rights in the State. West Bengal Human Rights Commission was constituted on 31 January 1995 vide Notification No. 42-HS/HRC in accordance with the Protection of Human Rights Act, 1993. The subsequent Notification No. 180-HS/HRC dated 13 March 1995 set the terms and conditions of service of its chairperson and members. The Commission became fully operational after its first chairperson and members were appointed on 14 March 1995. The commission works with a vision to creating a culture of human rights where every individual lives with dignity and respect, providing a crucial link between people and Government.

== Functions ==
According to TPHRA, 1993 (with amendment act 2006), the commission is entitled to perform any of the following functions:

- Autonomously investigate on a petition filed by a victim or any person on his/her behalf as a complaint of

1. Violation of human rights and instigation or
2. Negligence in the prevention of such violations by any public servant.

- Get involved in any proceeding under allegation or violation of human right pending before a court with the approval of that court.
- Inspect living conditions of the inmates in any jail or any other institution under the control of the State Government where persons are detained or lodged for purposes of treatment, reformation or protection.
- Review the safeguards provided in the constitution or any other law for the time it is in force to ensure the protection of human rights
- Review the factors that inhibit the enjoyment of human rights
- Undertake and promote research and awareness programs in the field of human right
- Promote human right awareness through literacy campaigns, publications, seminars etc. for the protection and safeguards available under human rights practices.
- Encourage involvement of Non-Government Organizations and individuals for expansion work in the field of human rights awareness.
- Perform any other functions that may be considered necessary for the promotion of human rights.

It is clarified that though the commission has the power to inquire in violation of human rights (or instigation thereof) by a public servant. Instances where the human rights are violated by any individual citizen then the commission can intervene, if there is failure or negligence on the part of a public servant to prevent any such violation.
