= R. S. Mongia =

Chief Justice of Guwahati High Court

Chief Justice of Guwahati High Court
- In office 21 September 2001 – 10 June 2002
- Preceded by: N. C. Jain
- Succeeded by: P. P. Naolekar

Chairperson of Punjab State Human Rights Commission
- In office 12 November 2007 – 9 June 2010
- Preceded by: N. C. Jain
- Succeeded by: Jagadish Bhalla

Personal details
- Born: 10 June 1940
- Died: 21 August 2017

Justice R. S. Mongia (1940–2017) was the Chief Justice of Guwahati High Court and Chairperson of Punjab State Human Rights Commission.

== Career ==
Justice Mongia obtained his law degree from Panjab University, Chandigarh in 1963 before he was enrolled as an Advocate in Punjab and Haryana High Court in the year 1964. On 15 June 1990 he was elevated as Judge of Punjab and Haryana High Court.

On 21 June 2001 he was transferred to Guwahati High Court as Acting Chief Justice and appointed as Chief Justice on 21 September 2001. He retired on 10 June 2002.

After this he was appointed the Chairperson of Punjab State Human Rights Commission on 12 November 2007 and served till 9 June 2010.

He died after long illness on 21 August 2017 in Delhi.
