= Naadumaskeri =

- village
- Country: India
- State: Karnataka

Languages
  - Official: Kannada
- Time zone: UTC+5:30 (IST)

Naadumaskeri is a village in Uttar Kannada next to Gokarna.

== Notable people ==
- S. R. Nayak
