= Odisha Human Rights Commission =

Commission in India

Agency overview
- Formed: 27 January 2000 (Notification: No. 5144/27.8.2000 )
- Preceding agency: National Human Rights Commission of India

Jurisdictional structure
- Federal agency: India
- Operations jurisdiction: India
- Area: 155,820 km^{2} (60,160 sq mi)
- Population: 41,947,358 (2011)
- General nature: Federal law enforcement

Operational structure
- Headquarters: Bhubaneswar, Odisha
- Agency executive: Justice B.K. Misra, Acting Chairperson

Website
- Official website

Odisha Human Rights commission was constituted on 27 January 2000 via home department notification No. 5144 Dt: 27.8.2000. However, it became formally operational on 11 July 2003 with the appointment of Justice D. P. Mohapatra, a former Chief Justice of the Allahabad High Court and former Judge of the Supreme Court of India joined as its first chairperson of the commission via notification No. 8438 Dt: 24.6.2003. He was supported by Shri S.M. Patnaik, a former Chief Secretary to Government of Orissa via notification No. 8441 Dt: 24.6.2003.

== Functions ==
According to TPHRA, 1993 (with amendment act 2006), the commission is entitled to perform any of the following functions:

- Autonomously investigate on a petition filed by a victim or any person on his/her behalf as a complaint of

1. Violation of human rights and instigation or
2. Negligence in the prevention of such violations by any public servant.

- Get involved in any proceeding under allegation or violation of human right pending before a court with the approval of that court.
- Inspect living conditions of the inmates in any jail or any other institution under the control of the State Government where persons are detained or lodged for purposes of treatment, reformation or protection.
- Review the safeguards provided in the constitution or any other law for the time it is in force to ensure the protection of human rights
- Review the factors that inhibit the enjoyment of human rights
- Undertake and promote research and awareness programs in the field of human right
- Promote human right awareness through literacy campaigns, publications, seminars etc. for the protection and safeguards available under human rights practices.
- Encourage involvement of Non-Government Organizations and individuals for expansion work in the field of human rights awareness.
- Perform any other functions that may be considered necessary for the promotion of human rights.

It is clarified that though the Commission has the power to inquire in violation of human rights (or instigation thereof) by a public servant. Instances where the human rights are violated by any individual citizen then the Commission can intervene, if there is failure or negligence on the part of a public servant to prevent any such violation.
