= Abhay Manohar Sapre =

Indian judge (born 1954)

Hon'ble Justice (Retd.) Abhay Manohar Sapre
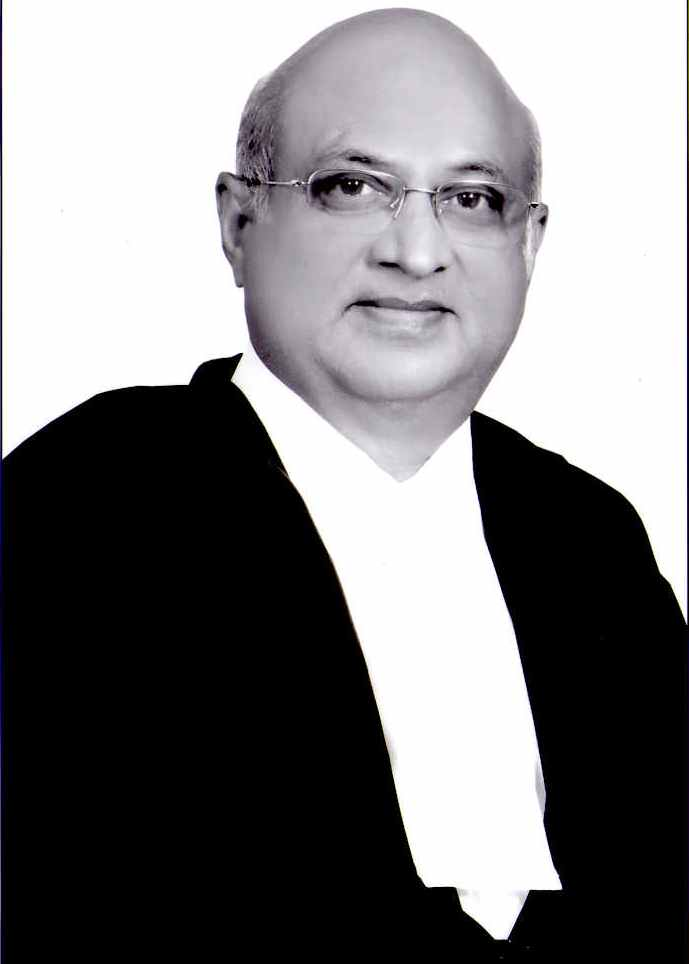

Judge of the Supreme Court of India
- In office 13 August 2014 – 27 August 2019
- Nominated by: R. M. Lodha
- Appointed by: Pranab Mukherjee

35th Chief Justice of Gauhati High Court
- In office 19 October 2013 – 12 August 2014
- Nominated by: P. Sathasivam
- Appointed by: Pranab Mukherjee
- Preceded by: Adarsh Kumar Goel
- Succeeded by: Ajit Singh; T. Vaiphei (acting); K. Sreedhar Rao (acting)

1st Chief Justice of Manipur High Court
- In office 23 March 2013 – 18 October 2013
- Nominated by: Altamas Kabir
- Appointed by: Pranab Mukherjee
- Preceded by: Position established
- Succeeded by: Laxmi Kanta Mohapatra

Judge of the Chhattisgarh High Court
- In office 23 April 2012 – 22 March 2013
- Nominated by: S. H. Kapadia
- Appointed by: Pratibha Patil
- Acting Chief Justice
- In office 10 October 2012 – 21 October 2012
- Appointed by: Pranab Mukherjee
- Preceded by: Rajeev Gupta
- Succeeded by: Yatindra Singh

Judge of the Rajasthan High Court
- In office 11 February 2010 – 22 April 2012
- Nominated by: K. G. Balakrishnan
- Appointed by: Pratibha Patil

Judge of the Madhya Pradesh High Court
- In office 25 October 1999 – 10 February 2010
- Nominated by: A. S. Anand
- Appointed by: K. R. Narayanan

Personal details
- Born: 28 August 1954 (age 71) Jabalpur
- Education: LL.B.
- Alma mater: Government Arts College, Jabalpur; University of Jabalpur

Abhay Manohar Sapre (born 28 August 1954) is a retired judge of the Supreme Court of India. He served as the chief justice of the Gauhati High Court and First Chief Justice of Manipur High Court. He was formerly also a judge of the Chhattisgarh High Court, Rajasthan High Court and Madhya Pradesh High Court.

== Early life and education ==
Justice Sapre was born on 28 August 1954 at Jabalpur. Sapre studied at Government Arts College, Jabalpur. He obtained an LL.B. degree from the University Teaching Department (VTD) Jabalpur, University of Jabalpur.

== Career ==
He enrolled as an advocate on 21 January 1978. He practiced on civil, constitutional and labour sides in the Madhya Pradesh High Court. He was elevated as an additional judge of the Madhya Pradesh High Court on 25 October 1999 and made permanent on 24 October 2001.

He was transferred as judge of the Rajasthan High Court on 11 February 2010. He was transferred as judge of the Chhattisgarh High Court on 23 April 2012. Here he also served as acting chief justice when the then chief justice Rajiv Gupta retired and remained as such till the appointment of Yatindra Singh as new permanent chief justice.

He was elevated as the first chief justice of the Manipur High Court upon its creation on 23 March 2013. He was transferred as chief justice of the Gauhati High Court on 19 October 2013. He was elevated as a judge of the Supreme Court of India on 13 August 2014. He retired on 27 August 2019.

He remained active in legal profession post retirement by accepting court appointments such as member of expert committee, acting as mediator for resolving disputes and assisting courts as and when asked.
