= Maharashtra State Human Rights Commission =

Maharashtra State Human Rights Commission महाराष्ट्र राज्य मानवी हक्क आयोग

Agency overview
- Formed: 6 March 2001 (Notification: )
- Preceding agency: National Human Rights Commission of India

Jurisdictional structure
- Federal agency: India
- Operations jurisdiction: India
- Area: 307,713 km^{2} (118,809 sq mi)
- Population: 112,372,972 (2011)
- General nature: Federal law enforcement

Operational structure
- Headquarters: Mumbai, Maharashtra
- Agency executives: Shri. A. M. Badar (retired ,Kerala high court judge since march 2025), Chairperson; Shri. Bhagwantrao D. More, Member chief3name = Shri. M. A. Sayeed

Website
- Official website

The Maharashtra State Human Rights Commission (MSHRC) was constituted on 6 March 2001 with the appointment of Justice Arvind Sawant from Bombay High Court as the first Chairperson along with Dr.Vijay Chitnis and Shri. M. R. Patil as the supporting members of the commission.

In January 2021, Tukaram Mundhe appointed as Maharashtra State Human Rights Commission secretary

== Functions ==
According to TPHRA, 1993 (with amendment act 2006), the commission is entitled to perform any of the following functions:

- Autonomously investigate on a petition filed by a victim or any person on his/her behalf as a complaint of

1. Violation of human rights and instigation or
2. Negligence in the prevention of such violations by any public servant.

- Get involved in any proceeding under allegation or violation of human right pending before a court with the approval of that court.
- Inspect living conditions of the inmates in any jail or any other institution under the control of the State Government where persons are detained or lodged for purposes of treatment, reformation or protection.
- Review the safeguards provided in the constitution or any other law for the time it is in force to ensure the protection of human rights
- Review the factors that inhibit the enjoyment of human rights
- Undertake and promote research and awareness programs in the field of human right
- Promote human right awareness through literacy campaigns, publications, seminars etc for the protection and safeguards available under human rights practices.
- Encourage involvement of Non-Government Organizations and individuals for expansion work in the field of human rights awareness.
- Perform any other functions that may be considered necessary for the promotion of human rights.

It is clarified that though the Commission has the power to inquire in violation of human rights (or instigation thereof) by a public servant. Instances where the human rights are violated by any individual citizen then the Commission can intervene, if there is failure or negligence on the part of a public servant to prevent any such violation.
