= V. Ramasubramanian =

Chairperson of National Human Rights Commission of India

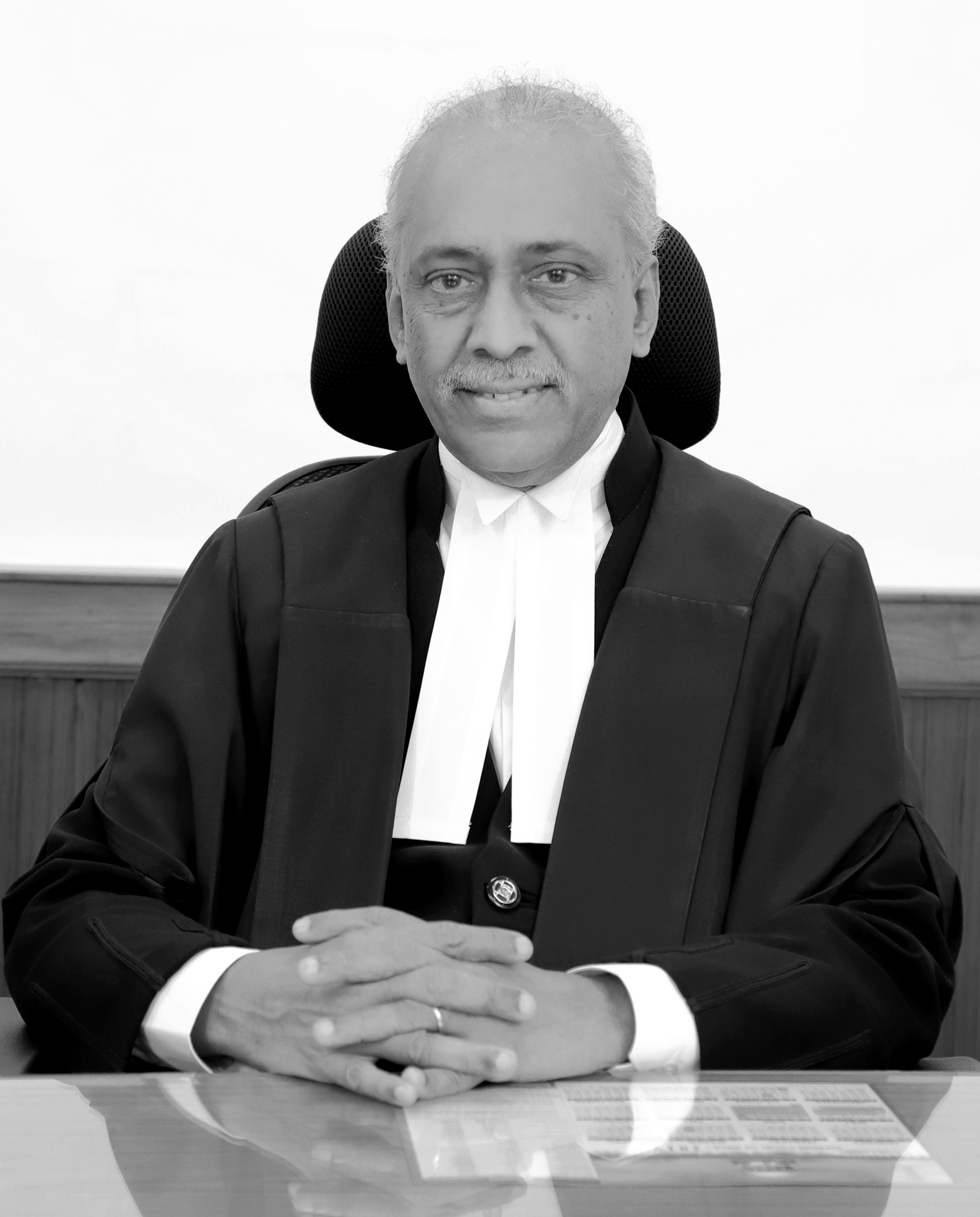

9th Chairperson of National Human Rights Commission of India
- Incumbent
- Assumed office 30 December 2024
- Appointed by: Droupadi Murmu
- Preceded by: Arun Kumar Mishra

Judge of Supreme Court of India
- In office 23 September 2019 – 29 June 2023
- Nominated by: Ranjan Gogoi
- Appointed by: Ram Nath Kovind

24th Chief Justice of Himachal Pradesh High Court
- In office 22 June 2019 – 22 September 2019
- Nominated by: Ranjan Gogoi
- Appointed by: Ram Nath Kovind
- Preceded by: Surya Kant
- Succeeded by: L. Narayana Swamy

Judge of Telangana High Court
- In office 27 April 2016 – 21 June 2019
- Nominated by: T. S. Thakur
- Appointed by: Pranab Mukherjee

Judge of Madras High Court
- In office 31 July 2006 – 26 April 2016
- Nominated by: Y. K. Sabharwal
- Appointed by: A. P. J. Abdul Kalam

Personal details
- Born: 30 June 1958 (age 68) Mannargudi, Tamil Nadu
- Education: Ramakrishna Mission Vivekananda College, Madras Law College
- Website: www.sci.gov.in

V. Ramasubramanian (born 30 June 1958) is the incumbent chairperson of National Human Rights Commission of India and a former judge of Supreme Court of India. He is a former chief justice of Himachal Pradesh High Court and former judge of Madras High Court and Telangana High Court. Ramasubramanian retired from the Supreme Court on 29 June 2023.

Over the course of his Supreme Court tenure, Ramasubramanian wrote 102 judgments. Ramasubramanian was a member of benches that heard arguments concerning the 2016 Demonetization policy and the validity of circumstantial evidence in bribery cases.

He was appointed as the 9th chairperson of the National Human Rights Commission of India.
