= Punjab State Human Rights Commission =

Statutory public body to protect human rights

Agency overview
- Formed: 17 March 1997
- Preceding agency: National Human Rights Commission of India

Jurisdictional structure
- Operations jurisdiction: Punjab, India
- Area: 50,362 km^{2} (19,445 sq mi)
- Population: 27,704,236 (2011)
- Legal jurisdiction: Punjab, India
- Constituting instrument: Protection of Human Rights Act 1993

Operational structure
- Headquarters: Chandigarh, India
- Agency executives: Justice Sant Prakash, Chairperson.; Justice Gurbir Singh, Judicial Member.; Jitender Singh Shunty, Member.

Website
- Official website

The Punjab State Human Rights Commission (PSHRC) of Punjab, India is a statutory public body constituted on 17 March 1997. It was given a statutory basis by the Protection of Human Rights Act, 1993 (PHRA). The PSHRC is the State Human Rights Commission of Punjab, responsible for the protection and promotion of human rights, defined by the Act as "Rights Relating To Life, liberty, equality and dignity of the individual guaranteed by the Constitution or embodied in the International Covenants and enforceable by courts in India."

== Background ==
The decision to set up Punjab State Human Rights Commission was taken vide notification by State Government on 17 March 1997 under the Protection of Human Rights Act 1993 No.10 of 1994 to protect human rights as granted by Constitution of India. The Commission started functioning on 16 July 1997.

== List of Chairpersons ==
S. No.	Name	Tenure		
1	Justice V. K. Khanna	16 July 1997	16 July 2002	5 years
2	Justice N. C. Jain	27 February 2003	28 February 2006	3 years, 1 day
3	Justice R. S. Mongia	12 November 2007	9 June 2010	2 years, 209 days
4	Justice Jagadish Bhalla	22 March 2011	22 March 2016	5 years
5	Justice Iqbal Ahmed Ansari	1 August 2017	1 August 2022	5 years
6	Justice Sant Prakash	31 March 2023	Incumbent	3 years, 228 days
