= State Human Rights Commission Tamil Nadu =

Human Rights Commission in India

Agency overview
- Formed: 17 April 1997 (Notification: G.O.Ms. 1465/1466)
- Preceding agency: National Human Rights Commission of India

Jurisdictional structure
- Federal agency: India
- Operations jurisdiction: India
- Area: 130,058 km^{2} (50,216 sq mi)
- Population: 72,147,030 (2011)
- General nature: Federal law enforcement

Operational structure
- Headquarters: Chennai, Tamil Nadu
- Agency executives: Justice S.Manikumar, Chairperson; Thiru. D.Jayachandran, Member

Website
- Official website

The State Human Rights Commission of Tamil Nadu become functional vied notification G.O.Ms: 1466 on 17 April 1997. It was constituted by the earlier notification G.O.Ms 1465 Dt: 20 December 1996.

Tamil Nadu is one of the very few States which has constituted a Commission for the Human Rights.

== Composition of Commission ==
- Under section 21 of the above Act, the Government in its order in G.O.Ms. 1465 1466 Public (L&O) Dept. dated 20.12.1996, Constituted the State Human Rights Commission with the following members: a) A Chairperson who has been a Chief Justice of the High Court or Justice of the High Court. (b) One member who is or has been a judge of the High Court. (c) One Member who is or has been a judge of the District Court. (d) Two members to be appointed from amongst persons having knowledge of or practical experience, in matters relating to human rights. (e) One Secretary not below the rank of the Secretary to Government who shall be the ( Executive Officer of the State Commission.

== Officers and staff of the State Commission. ==
The State Government shall make available to the commission:

(a) such police and investigative staff under an Officer not below the rank of an Inspector General of Police and such other Officers and staff as may be necessary for the efficient performance of the functions of the State Commission.

(b) Subject to such rules as may be made by the State Government in this behalf, the State Commission may appoint such other administrative, technical and scientific staff as it may consider necessary.
