= Yatindra Singh =

8th Chief Justice of Chhattisgarh High Court

Hon'ble the Chief Justice (Retd.) Yatindra Singh
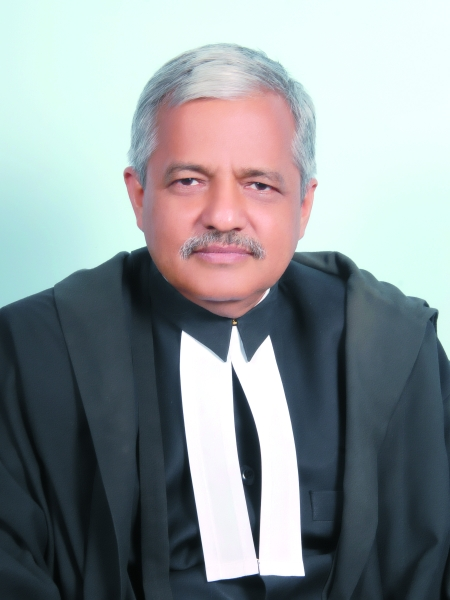

8th Chief Justice of Chhattisgarh High Court
- In office 22 October 2012 – 8 October 2014
- Nominated by: Altamas Kabir
- Appointed by: Pranab Mukherjee
- Preceded by: Rajeev Gupta; A. M. Sapre (acting)
- Succeeded by: Navin Sinha

Judge of Allahabad High Court
- In office 5 February 1999 – 21 October 2012
- Nominated by: A. S. Anand
- Appointed by: K. R. Narayanan

Personal details
- Born: 9 October 1952 (age 73)
- Education: B.Sc and LL.B.
- Alma mater: Allahabad University

Yatindra Singh (born 9 October 1952) is a retired Indian judge, who served as the 8th Chief Justice of the Chhattisgarh High Court from 2012 to 2014. He is also former judge of the Allahabad High Court.

== Background and education ==
He belongs to the family of lawyers, his father V. K. S. Chaudhary was a senior advocate at Allahabad High Court and former Advocate general of Uttar Pradesh. His grandfather K. C. S. Chaudhary was a leading advocate at Banda, Uttar Pradesh, where his uncles also practised. He passed High school and intermediate with first division. He completed his graduation in science with distinction from Allahabad University in 1970 by securing 6th rank in order of merit. He represented Uttar Pradesh in Table Tennis. He is a champion, captain and cardholder of the University of Allahabad in Table Tennis and Squash.

== Career ==
He registered with Bar Council of Uttar Pradesh on 18 October 1973 and went on to serve as Additional Advocate General of Uttar Pradesh from 26 March 1997 to 4 February 1999. Among other important cases as additional advocate general, he was the main counsel at the Allahabad High Court in the case, where government of chief minister Kalyan Singh was reinstated, after its dismissal by the then Governor Romesh Bhandari.

He was appointed as judge of Allahabad High Court on 5 February 1999 and served as such till his elevation as chief justice of Chhattisgarh High Court in 2012. he took oath on 22 October 2012 and retired in 8 October 2014. Post retirement he is practising senior advocate in Supreme Court of India. He has written two books entitled Cyberlaws & A Lawyer's World and Childhood dreams.
