= Uttarakhand Human Rights Commission =

Agency overview
- Formed: 13 May 2013 (Notification: No. 2388-89 )
- Preceding agency: National Human Rights Commission of India

Jurisdictional structure
- Federal agency: India
- Operations jurisdiction: India
- Area: 53,483 km^{2} (20,650 sq mi)
- Population: 10,116,752 (2011)
- General nature: Federal law enforcement

Operational structure
- Headquarters: Dehradun, Uttarakhand
- Agency executive: Justice Akhilesh Chandra Sharma, Chairperson

The Uttarakhand Human Rights Commission is the human rights watchdog in the state of Uttarakhand. It became functional after the appointment of Justice Vijender Jain, a former Chief Justice of Punjab and Haryana High Court who took charge as the first Chairperson on 13 May 2013 and served there till 16 August 2018.

He was joined by Justice Rajesh Tandon, a former judge of Allahabad High Court and Uttarakhand High Court on 7 June 2013 as a supporting member of the commission and served there till 30 June 2016. The chairperson is Akhilesh Chandra Sharma. In October 2026, HC Semwal is a member of the Commission.

== Functions ==
According to TPHRA, 1993, the commission is entitled to perform any of the following functions:

- Independently investigate a petition filed by a victim or another person on their behalf concerning

1. Violation of human rights and instigation or
2. Negligence in the prevention of such violations by any public servant.

- Get involved in any proceeding under allegation or violation of human rights pending before a court with the approval of that court.
- Inspect living conditions of the inmates in any jail or any other institution under the control of the State Government where persons are detained or lodged for purposes of treatment, reformation or protection.
- Review the safeguards provided in the constitution or any other law for the time it is in force to ensure the protection of human rights
- Review the factors that inhibit the enjoyment of human rights
- Undertake and promote research and awareness programs in the field of human rights
- Promote human rights awareness through literacy campaigns, publications, seminars etc. for the protection and safeguards available under human rights practices.
- Encourage involvement of Non-Government Organizations and individuals for expansion work in the field of human rights awareness.
- Perform any other functions that may be considered necessary for the promotion of human rights.

It is clarified that though the Commission has the power to inquire in violation of human rights (or instigation thereof) by a public servant. Instances where the human rights are violated by any individual citizen then the Commission can intervene, if there is failure or negligence on the part of a public servant to prevent any such violation.
