= Bihar Human Rights Commission =

Government agency in India

Bihar Human Rights Commission बिहार मानवाधिकार आयोग

Agency overview
- Formed: 3 January 2000 (Notification: 207)
- Preceding agency: National Human Rights Commission of India

Jurisdictional structure
- Federal agency: India
- Operations jurisdiction: India
- Area: 94,163 km^{2} (36,357 sq mi)
- Population: 103,804,637 (2015)
- Constituting instrument: TPHRA, 1993
- General nature: Federal law enforcement

Operational structure
- Headquarters: Patna, Bihar
- Agency executives: Justice Bilal Nazki, Chairperson; Justice Mandhata Singh, Member

Website
- Official website

Bihar Human Rights Commission was established on 3 January 2000 by Notification No. 207. The Commission became functional by notification No. 6896 on 25 January 2008 with the appointment of its first chairperson, Justice S. N. Jha, former Chief Justice of the Jammu & Kashmir and Rajasthan High Court, along with Justice Rajendra Prasad, a former Judge of the Patna High Court and R. R. Prasad, a former Director General of Police, Bihar as members of the commission.

== Functions ==
According to the Protection of Human Rights Act, 1993 (with amendment act 2006), the commission is entitled to perform any of the following functions:

- Autonomously investigate on a petition filed by a victim or any person on his/her behalf as a complaint of

1. Violation of human rights and instigation or
2. Negligence in the prevention of such violations by any public servant.

- Get involved in any proceeding under allegation or violation of human rights pending before a court with the approval of that court.
- Inspect living conditions of the inmates in any jail or any other institution under the control of the State Government where persons are detained or lodged for purposes of treatment, reformation, or protection.
- Review the safeguards provided in the constitution or any other law for the time it is in force to ensure the protection of human rights.
- Review the factors that inhibit the enjoyment of human rights.
- Undertake and promote research and awareness programs in the field of human rights.
- Promote human rights awareness through literacy campaigns, publications, seminars etc. for the protection and safeguards available under human rights practices.
- Encourage involvement of Non-Government Organizations and individuals for expansion work in the field of human rights awareness.
- Perform any other functions that may be considered necessary for the promotion of human rights.

It is clarified that, though the commission has the power to inquire in violation of human rights (or instigation thereof) by a public servant, in instances where human rights are violated by a private citizen, the commission can intervene if there is failure or negligence on the part of a public servant to prevent any such violation.
