= Arun Kumar Mishra =

Indian judge (born 1955)

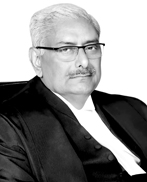

Chairperson of the National Human Rights Commission of India
- In office 2 June 2021 – 1 June 2024
- Appointed by: Ram Nath Kovind
- Preceded by: H. L. Dattu
- Succeeded by: V. Ramasubramanian

Judge of the Supreme Court of India
- In office 7 July 2014 – 2 September 2020
- Nominated by: Rajendra Mal Lodha
- Appointed by: Pranab Mukherjee

Chief Justice of the Calcutta High Court
- In office 14 December 2012 – 6 July 2014
- Nominated by: Altamas Kabir
- Appointed by: Pranab Mukherjee

Chief Justice of the Rajasthan High Court
- In office 26 November 2010 – 13 December 2012
- Nominated by: S. H. Kapadia
- Appointed by: Pratibha Patil

Judge of the Madhya Pradesh High Court
- In office 25 October 1999 – 12 September 2010
- Nominated by: Adarsh Sein Anand
- Appointed by: Kocheril Raman Narayanan

Personal details
- Born: 3 September 1955 (age 70) Gwalior

Arun Kumar Mishra (born 3 September 1955) is the Ombudsman and Ethics Officer of the Board of Control for Cricket in India and former chairperson of the National Human Rights Commission of India. He is a former judge of the Supreme Court of India and a former chief justice of the Calcutta High Court and Rajasthan High Court. He is also a former judge of the Madhya Pradesh High Court.

== Early life and education ==
Born on September 3, 1955, in Gwalior, Mishra's father, Hargovind Mishra, was a judge of the Madhya Pradesh High Court. Mishra pursued a diverse educational path, completing his graduation in science followed by a law degree and a master’s degree simultaneously. He practiced from 1978 to October 1999 in constitutional, civil, industrial, criminal and service matters in the bench of High Court of Madhya Pradesh at Gwalior. He worked as a part-time lecturer in law from 1986 to 1993 and was a member of the faculty of law of Jiwaji University, Gwalior from 1991 to 1996.

Mishra was appointed additional judge of the High Court of Madhya Pradesh on 25 October 1999 and permanent judge on 24 October 2001. He was transferred to Rajasthan High Court, Jodhpur and took oath on 12 September 2010. He became acting chief justice of Rajasthan High Court on 1 November 2010. He took oath of the office of the Chief Justice of Rajasthan on 26 November 2010.

== Achievements ==
Mishra has taken several steps to dovetail technology in functions of Rajasthan High Court. His initiatives include publication of first ever Newsletter of Rajasthan High Court and inauguration of a Museum.

== Calcutta High Court ==
He was appointed the Chief Justice of the Calcutta High Court on 14 December 2012 and served until 2014 and was later elevated as a judge of the Supreme Court.

== Chairperson of NHRC ==
On 2 June 2021, he was appointed the chairperson of the National Human Rights Commission of India and served there till 1 June 2024.

His appointment was criticised by opposition leader Mallikarjun Kharge, who requested to appoint a member of the Scheduled Caste or Scheduled Tribe communities, arguing that most complaints lodged with NHRC deal with atrocities committed against these communities.

Mishra issued advisories on:

- The protection and rehabilitation of beggars.
- Self-harm and suicide attempts by prisoners.
- The welfare of transgender persons.
- Ocular trauma and rehabilitation of low vision persons.
- The rights of truck drivers and for halting places and medical check-ups.
- Pollution.
- Persons affected by leprosy (Hansen's diseases).
- Bonded labourers.
- Rights of people cleaning septic tanks & sewers, and for providing mechanical cleaning.

== Cricket ==
On 1 January 2025, he was appointed as the Ombudsman and Ethics Officer of the Board of Cricket Control of India.

== Decisions by Ombudsman of BCCI ==
- BCCI Ombudsman imposes lifetime ban on Mumbai's cricket league team owner over match-fixing charges.

== Notable Decisions ==
- As to Anticipatory Bail, held Right to Liberty is valuable, should not be interfered with lightly. Once pre-arrest bail is granted, should not be for a limited period.
- Rendered a landmark judgment overruling earlier decisions with respect to land acquisition in view of 2013 Act. This saved the land acquisitions made decades before from lapsing under the new Act.
- Held an accused is not entitled to acquittal merely on technical ground because informant was an investigation officer for an offence under NDPS Act. However, cautioned that the evidence has to be scrutinized stringently in such cases.
- Held that the State has power to make reservation for in-service doctors for post graduate courses to increase efficiency of service.
- SARFAESI Act was held applicable to co-operative Banks as it does to commercial banks. Earlier decision to the contrary was overruled.
- He dissented holding that to a trickle down benefit it is as permissible to provide for the reservation within a reserved class as that class is not homogeneous class. The opinion was recently accepted by a 7 judge bench and the earlier decision was overruled.
- Dealing with a legal recusal, that a judge can be part of a larger bench even if he has expressed his opinion on a legal issue in a smaller bench.
- Rights conferred on religious and linguistic minorities to administer educational institutions under Article 30 - held that the state can impose reasonable restrictions. The holding of National level entrance exam in MBBS was upheld. Putting national interest above religious and linguistic minority community’s right to administer educational institutions, ruled that single window National Eligibility-cum-Entrance Test (NEET) would be mandatory for admissions to medical and dental courses offered by private unaided minority medical/dental colleges.
- Dealt with Section 6 of the Hindu succession Act and in a landmark judgment held that a daughter has an equal right in coparcenary property even if she was born before the 2005 amendment.
- Judicial officers can’t be appointed as District Judges as against direct recruitment quota reserved for practicing advocates.
- Decision imposing various restrictions for registration of FIR and arrest of accused for offences under SC/ST (Prevention of Atrocities) Act were set aside holding that different yard stick cannot be applied because the complainant belongs to down trodden class of SC/ST.
- In case concerning violation of coastal zone regulation which prohibited raising of structures, a high-rise building at Maradu, Kerala was directed to be demolished for lack of clearance, and ordered buyers to be compensated by the builders.
- Dealt with Green Bench in Supreme Court - M.C. Mehta, with respect to environment and control of Pollution issued various directions for Delhi and various parts of country, in particular in Delhi-NCR region. Relied upon various principles embodied in the chapters of Directive Principles and Fundamental Duties in the Constitution. Directions were issued keeping in view scientific knowledge and expert opinion. These included directions qua stubble burning, demolition and construction activities, road dust (installation of water sprinklers), waste and garbage disposal and re-cycling, halting of non-conforming polluting industries, etc. Concrete action plans were called for. Responsibility and accountability of different stakeholders and agencies were fixed.
- Dealing with preservation of the environment - Invoking the public trust doctrine, quashed the environmental clearance granted to housing project within the catchment area of the Sukhna lake to Members of Legislative assembly of Punjab.
- In the Orthodox Syrian Malankara Church dispute in Kerala, inter-alia dealing with vicars appointment, drew a distinction between spiritual and temporal matters and held appointment of vicars is not a spiritual but a secular matter. Also, held that the 1934 constitution fully governs the parish churches and stopped running of parallel churches from the same premises.
- Held the executive instructions regarding free treatment of poor people are binding. It is the obligation of hospitals to provide free treatment to weaker sections of society as the government grants them land at “concessional rates” for “charitable purpose” without further stipulation in the agreement.
- Voluntary retirement is not a right. Government employee cannot seek voluntary retirement as a matter of right, government can deny prayer in larger public interest. The decision of State Government was held to be justified due to severe shortage of doctors in the state.
- Held- in view of fraud and negligence of Builder and non-action of Noida Authority and financer bank of builder failed to check siphoning of money. They cannot claim money from innocent flat buyers. Amrapali Project was given to NBCC who has revived the project by constructing 42,000 flats.
- Decided matter of Jagannath Puri Temple. Issued various directions including those relating to providing facilities to pilgrims, and to prevent desecration of deities, prescribed Rituals and role to be performed.
- Punished an Advocate of Supreme Court for Contempt of Court via a well-reasoned and elaborate judicial order. Imposed fine of Rs.1.
- Quashed order providing 100% reservation in Andhra Pradesh to Scheduled Tribe candidates in teaching job in scheduled areas. 100 per cent reservation would be “unfair” and “unreasonable” and no law mandates that only tribal teachers can teach in the scheduled areas. Reservation should not exceed 50%.
- Directed that devotees should not rub the Shivalingam at Mahakal temple. It also directed that the committee would ensure that the pH value, which is used to specify the acidity or basicity, of ‘Bhasma’ during ‘Bhasma Aarti’ is improved and the Shivalingam is preserved from further deterioration. Also directed that encroachment within 500 metres of the area of the temple premises be removed. While observing that the Court cannot direct as to what kind of Pooja-Archana is to be performed, however, rituals should be performed, the Court also stated that there is no scope for commercialization” of temples.
- It is the quantity not purity of narcotic drugs/banned substance seized that will decide punishment.
- Supreme Court cannot issue blanket order against invoking NSA on anti-CAA protestors.
- Directed Delhi Govt. to release Rs.1,000 cr. for eastern and western peripheral expressways. The traffic on both these expressways is expected to grow further in times to come, relieving the city of Delhi from vehicular congestion, carbon emissions and the net reduction to vehicular pollution to a substantial extent.
- Held that modification of ‘desi model vehicle’ to satiate a penchant for making it resemble any sleek foreign brand, would not be allowed and transport authorities would refuse to register the vehicle. Only the prototype of the vehicle manufactured is tested for road-worthiness and safety features and hence, no vehicle which does not match the original specifications of manufacturer could be permitted to be registered under Motor Vehicles Act.
- Girl with disability was given MBBS seat – holding executive action cannot be against rules. Disabled should be given full opportunity.
- Held- in view of fraud and negligence of Builder and non-action of Noida Authority and financer bank of builder failed to check siphoning of money. They cannot claim money from innocent flat buyers. Amrapali Project was given to NBCC who has revived the project by constructing 42,000 flats.
- Upheld the validity of the Act enacted by the state legislature of West Bengal as to the appointment of teachers in Madarsas through state level commission wound not infringe rights of minorities institutions ensured under article 29 of the constitution of India.
- Held that if a prima facie case against the accused is not made out, anticipatory bail can be granted even under the SC/ST Act.
- Overruling earlier decisions held that not only defendant but plaintiff can also raise a plea of adverse possession to protect his title by filing a suit for declaration or for permanent injunction.
- Defined AGR and upheld the recovery of AGR dues of Rs. 1,69,000 crores by the government from Telecom Companies.
- Held that the Good Samaritan should not be harassed or called by police, and guidelines for protection of the bystanders who assisted motor accident victims will have the force of law. These directions were passed under Article 142 of the Constitution later on amendments were made accordingly in statutory provisions.
- ESI ACT a beneficial legislation was held applicable to the Royal Western India Turf Club Ltd. Bangalore and the test for constituting industry was dealt with.

== Controversies ==
In February 2020, the Supreme Court Bar Association (SCBA) condemned Justice Mishra's statements to praise Prime Minister Narendra Modi. On 22 February 2020, at the inaugural ceremony of the International Judicial Conference, Mishra said, "India is a responsible and most friendly member of the international community under the stewardship of the internationally acclaimed visionary Prime Minister Shri Narendra Modi." He described Modi as "a versatile genius who thinks globally and acts locally".

In response on 26 February 2020, SCBA condemned Mishra's sycophantic remarks for Modi and in a resolution it said such statements reflect poorly on the independence of judiciary which is a basic feature of the Constitution of India. The resolution asserted that if judges show their proximity to politicians, it will influence their judgments in the courts.

On 31 August 2020, a former minister in the Government of India Yashwant Sinha ridiculed Mishra’s slavish behaviour toward Modi. He suggested in a contemptuous tenor that after Mishra’s retirement, Modi should reward him with a job that is more than a Rajya Sabha seat. In October 2021, Sinha criticized Mishra again for his sycophancy for Modi's colleague Amit Shah who is the Home Minister of India.

In an article titled "The Shadow of Haren Pandya's Case Lies Long Over Justice Arun Mishra" published on 30 August 2020, The Wire news site critically analyzed Mishra's judgments.

In an article on 23 April 2020, The Hindu newspaper suggested enacting a law to stop appointments of retired judges by the government in order to restore confidence in the judiciary.
