= Uttar Pradesh Human Rights Commission =

Uttar Pradesh Human Rights Commission उत्तर प्रदेश मानव अधिकार आयोग

Agency overview
- Formed: 7 October 2002 (Notification: No. 2388-89)
- Preceding agency: National Human Rights Commission of India

Jurisdictional structure
- Federal agency: India
- Operations jurisdiction: India
- Area: 243,286 km^{2} (93,933 sq mi)
- Population: 199,581,477 (2011)
- General nature: Federal law enforcement

Operational structure
- Headquarters: Lucknow, Uttar Pradesh
- Agency executive: Justice B. K. Narayana, Former Judge Alld. HC, Chairperson

Website
- Official website

In the State of Uttar Pradesh, the State Human Rights Commission was established on 4 April 1996. However, the Commission was formally constituted vide notification No. 2388-89 Dt: 7.10.2002 when Justice A.P. Mishra, a former Chief Justice of Delhi High Court and former Judge of Supreme Court of India was appointed as first Chairperson along with Justice V. Saran, Mr. S.R. Arya, Mr. S.V.M. Tripathi and Mr. Sukh Lal Adarsh as supporting members of the Commission. Currently, UPHRC is headed by Justice (Retired) Bala Krishna Narayan.

== Functions ==
According to TPHRA, 1993 (with amendment act 2006), the commission is entitled to perform any of the following functions:

- Autonomously investigate on a petition filed by a victim or any person on his/her behalf as a complaint of

1. Violation of human rights and instigation or
2. Negligence in the prevention of such violations by any public servant.

- Get involved in any proceeding under allegation or violation of human right pending before a court with the approval of that court.
- Inspect living conditions of the inmates in any jail or any other institution under the control of the State Government where persons are detained or lodged for purposes of treatment, reformation or protection.
- Review the safeguards provided in the constitution or any other law for the time it is in force to ensure the protection of human rights
- Review the factors that inhibit the enjoyment of human rights
- Undertake and promote research and awareness programs in the field of human right
- Promote human right awareness through literacy campaigns, publications, seminars etc. for the protection and safeguards available under human rights practices.
- Encourage involvement of Non-Government Organizations and individuals for expansion work in the field of human rights awareness.
- Perform any other functions that may be considered necessary for the promotion of human rights.

It is clarified that though the Commission has the power to inquire in violation of human rights (or instigation thereof) by a public servant. Instances where the human rights are violated by any individual citizen then the Commission can intervene, if there is failure or negligence on the part of a public servant to prevent any such violation.
