= Jawahar Lal Gupta =

Indian judge

Hon'ble Justice Jawahar Lal Gupta

Chief Justice of Kerala High Court
- In office November 2002 – January 2004

Judge of Punjab and Haryana High Court
- In office March 1991 – November 2002

Personal details
- Died: 3 January 2016 Delhi
- Cause of death: cancer
- Citizenship: Indian

Jawahar Lal Gupta was an Indian judge and a former Chief Justice of the Kerala High Court.

== Career ==
Gupta was enrolled as an advocate on 28 February 1963 and started practice in the Punjab and Haryana High Court. He was designated senior advocate in December 1982. While practising in the High Court he served as a part-time teacher of the faculty at the Law College. Gupta was a member of Panjab University’s law faculty and member of the Board of Studies in Law. On 15 March 1991 he was elevated as an additional judge of the Punjab and Haryana High Court. In November 2002 he was appointed Chief Justice of the Kerala High Court and retired on 22 January 2004. During his tenure Justice Gupta delivered some landmark judgments. He was an eminent blogger and known as Bold Judge as a man without fear or favour. Justice Gupta died on 3 January 2016 at the age of 74 in Delhi due to cancer.
