= Karnataka State Human Rights Commission =

Agency overview
- Formed: 25 July 2007 (Notification: LAW 20 LAG 05)

Jurisdictional structure
- Federal agency (Operations jurisdiction): India
- Operations jurisdiction: India
- Legal jurisdiction: Karnataka
- General nature: Federal law enforcement

Operational structure
- Headquarters: Bangalore, Karnataka
- Agency executive: L narayanaswamy, Chairperson

Website
- kshrc.kar.nic.in

The Karnataka State Human Rights Commission was formally constituted by the Government order No. LAW 20 LAG 05 dated 28 June 2005. However, the present chairperson and members were appointed by the Governor of Karnataka vide notification No. LAW 17 HRC 2005 Dt. 23.07.2007 & 28.07.2007

== Functions ==
Members: Three members, one is chairperson (who is retired chief justice of high court) and member -1 (who is In-service or retired judge of high court or 7 years experience as a judge in any district court of the state), member-2 (who should have practical knowledge and experience related to human rights).

According to TPHRA, 1993 (with amendment act 2006), the commission is entitled to perform any of the following func:ions:

- Autonomously investigate on a petition filed by a victim or any person on his/her behalf as a complaint of

1. Violation of human rights and instigation or
2. Negligence in the prevention of such violations by any public servant.

- Get involved in any proceeding under allegation or violation of human right pending before a court with the approval of that court.
- Inspect living conditions of the inmates in any jail or any other institution under the control of the State Government where persons are detained or lodged for purposes of treatment, reformation or protection.
- Review the safeguards provided in the constitution or any other law for the time it is in force to ensure the protection of human rights
- Review the factors that inhibit the enjoyment of human rights
- Undertake and promote research and awareness programs in the field of human right
- Promote human right awareness through literacy campaigns, publications, seminars etc. for the protection and safeguards available under human rights practices.
- Encourage involvement of Non-Government Organizations and individuals for expansion work in the field of human rights awareness.
- Perform any other functions that may be considered necessary for the promotion of human rights.

It is clarified that though the Commission has the power to inquire in violation of human rights (or instigation thereof) by a public servant. Instances where the human rights are violated by any individual citizen then the Commission can intervene, if there is failure or negligence on the part of a public servant to prevent any such violation.
