= B. Subhashan Reddy =

Indian judge (1943–2019)

Lokayukta Of Andhra Pradesh and Telangana
- In office 10 October 2012 – 10 October 2017

Chief Justice of Kerala High Court
- In office 21 November 2004 – 2 March 2005
- Succeeded by: Rajiv Gupta

Chief Justice of Madras High Court
- In office 12 September 2001 – 21 November 2004
- Preceded by: Nagendra Kumar Jain
- Succeeded by: Markandey Katju

Personal details
- Born: 2 March 1943 Hyderabad, Hyderabad State, British India
- Died: 1 May 2019 (aged 76) Gachibowli, Hyderabad, India
- Education: Osmania University

B. Subhashan Reddy (2 March 1943 — 1 May 2019) was an Indian judge who served as Chief Justice of two High Courts of India and Chairperson of the first Human Rights Commission of Andhra Pradesh.

== Career ==
Reddy was born at Bagh Amberpet in Hyderabad in 1943. He studied at Sultan Bazar and Chadarghat High Schools in Hyderabad, New Science College and passed law from Osmania University. In 1966, he started practice in the Andhra Pradesh High Court on Constitutional, Civil, Criminal, Revenue and Taxation matters. Reddy practiced in the Supreme Court of India also. On 25 November 1991 he was appointed a judge of the Andhra Pradesh High Court. He was elevated as Chief Justice of Madras High Court on 12 September 2001, thereafter transferred to Kerala High Court on 21 November 2004. Justice Reddy retired from the post on 2 March 2005. He also served as the first Chairman of Andhra Pradesh State Human Rights Commission and in October 2012, Reddy took charge in the post of Lokayukta of Andhra Pradesh. He died on 1 May 2019 at AIG Hospital in Gachibowli, Hyderabad.
