= Chief Justice of India shoe-throwing incident =

2025 incident in the Supreme Court of India

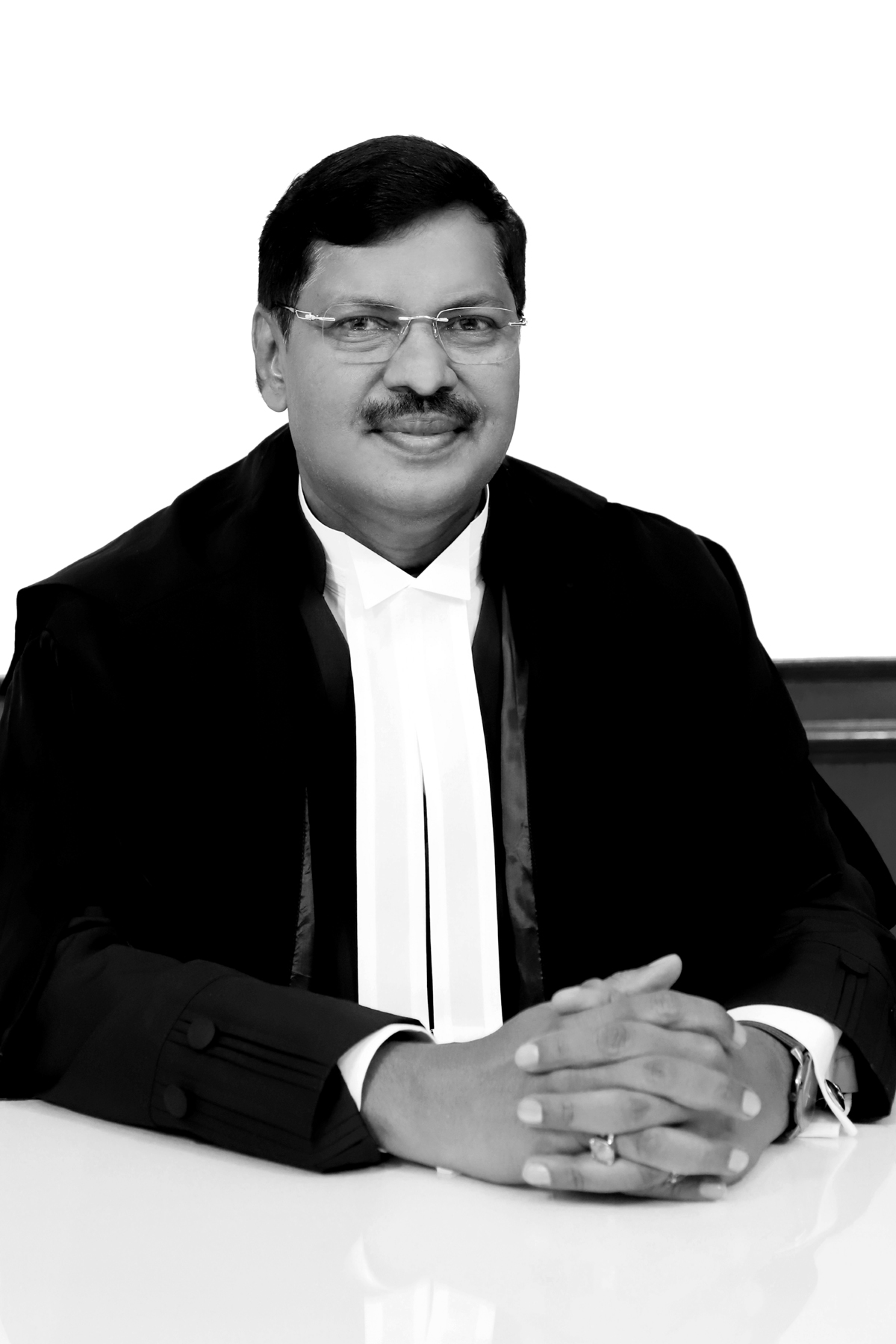
Chief Justice of India B. R. Gavai

The attempted shoe-hurling at then Chief Justice B. R. Gavai was an incident that occurred on 6 October 2025, in the Supreme Court of India when a lawyer, Rakesh Kishore, attempted to throw a shoe at the incumbent Chief Justice of India (CJI), Justice Bhushan Ramkrishna Gavai, during an open court proceeding. The incident, which was quickly contained by security personnel, was a rare and unprecedented breach of security and decorum in the highest judicial court of the country.

== Background ==
Rakesh Kishore, a 71-year-old advocate, was reportedly motivated by his disapproval of remarks made by CJI Gavai, (whose father R. S. Gavai led a faction of Republican Party of India, a Dalit Buddhist outfit that had been established by Dr. B. R. Ambedkar) in a previous hearing in which he made derogatory comments about Hinduism in India. Kishore, a Hindu nationalist, was unhappy with these blasphemous remarks, which he perceived as an "insult to Sanatan Dharma." As he was being restrained by security personnel, he was heard shouting the slogan, “Sanatan ka apmaan nahi sahenge” (We will not tolerate any insult to Sanatan in Hindi).

== The incident ==
On the morning of 6 October 2025, during court proceedings before the Chief Justice Court, Kishore suddenly approached the dais and attempted to remove and hurl a shoe towards Justice Gavai. Security personnel immediately intervened and overpowered the advocate before the shoe could reach the bench.

== Aftermath and reactions ==
=== Contempt proceedings ===
The Supreme Court Bar Association (SCBA) sought to initiate criminal contempt proceedings against Rakesh Kishore, calling the act a grave affront to the dignity of the institution. However, Justice Gavai refused any action and said that “he would rather let the incident die a natural death than fuel further social media debates.” SCBA obtained permission from the Attorney General of India R. Venkataramani initiate criminal contempt proceedings against Kishore under articles 129 and 142 of the Constitution of India. After obtaining Venkatramani's approval, SCBA filed a case with the Supreme Court. Court, however, refrained from issuing noticing in the matter and was not inclined to initiate contempt action. The court instead focused on asking the Attorney General and bar bodies to provide suggestions to formulate pan-India guidelines to prevent such occurrences in court premises.

=== Bar Council ===
Bar Council of India suspended Kishore from practice, and Supreme Court Bar Association (SCBA) terminated his temporary membership.

=== Political and social reaction ===
Prime Minister Narendra Modi condemned the act, calling the act "utterly condemnable" and adding that it "angered every Indian." Modi, through a post on X (formerly Twitter), also mentioned that he had spoken to the CJI and appreciated "the calm" displayed by him during the incident.

== See also ==
- List of shoe-throwing incidents
