= Gavai =

Gavai or Gawai is the surname of the following people

- B. R. Gavai, current Chief Justice of India
- Panchakshara Gawai (1892–1944), Indian blind singer
  - Sangeetha Sagara Ganayogi Panchakshara Gavai, a 1995 Indian Kannada biographical film
- Puttaraj Gawai (1914–2010), Indian musician
- R. S. Gavai (1929–2015), Indian politician
- Rajendra Gavai, Indian politician, son of R. S. Gavai
- Szonja Gávai (born 1993), Hungarian handball player
