= Association for Democratic Reforms v. Union of India =

2024 case about Electoral Bonds Scheme

- Court: Supreme Court of India
- Full case name: Association for Democratic Reforms and Ors. v. Union of India and Ors
- Decided: 15 February 2024
- Docket nos.: Writ Petition (C) No. 880 of 2017
- Citation: 2024 INSC 113

Court membership
- Judges sitting: D. Y. Chandrachud (CJI), Sanjiv Khanna, B. R. Gavai, J.B. Pardiwala, Manoj Misra

Case opinions
- The Supreme Court struck down the Electoral Bonds Scheme of 2018 as unconstitutional, citing violations of voters’ right to information and democratic transparency.

Keywords
- Electoral Bonds Scheme, Political Funding, Right to Information, Article 19(1)(a), Transparency

Association for Democratic Reforms v. Union of India., 2024 INSC 113, also known as Electoral Bonds case, was a landmark judgement by the Supreme Court of India that struck down the Electoral Bonds Scheme of 2018 finding it unconstitutional and in violation of the voters' right to information enshrined in Article 19(1)(a) of the Constitution. The court also struck down amendments to Section 182 of the Companies Act, 2013 which regulates contributions to political parties by companies as well as amendments made to the Income Tax Act and the Representation of People Act which had made the donations anonymous.

The judgement was delivered by a five-judge constitution bench led by Chief Justice Chandrachud with Justices Sanjiv Khanna, B.R. Gavai, J.B. Pardiwala, and Manoj Misra.
