= Gawai =

Gawai may refer to:

- Gawai, A village in Chitwan, Nepal
- Gawai Dayak, annual festival celebrated by the Dayak people in Sarawak, Malaysia

== See also ==
- Gavai, a surname
