= Arvind Singh Sangwan =

Indian Judge

Judge of Punjab and Haryana High Court
- In office 10 July 2017 – 1 November 2023
- Nominated by: Sanjiv Khanna
- Appointed by: Droupadi Murmu

Judge of Allahabad High Court
- Incumbent
- Assumed office 2 November 2023

Personal details
- Born: 23 December 1962 (age 63)
- Education: Lucknow University

Arvind Singh Sangwan (born 23 December 1962) is an Indian judge, currently serving on the Allahabad High Court in the state of Uttar Pradesh.

== Education & career ==
Arvind Singh Sangwan completed his schooling at D.A.V. Higher Secondary School, Karnal, and earned a Bachelor of Arts degree from Dayal Singh College, Karnal. He obtained his Bachelor of Laws from Kurukshetra University in 1984 and began his legal practice at the District Courts, Kurukshetra.

After his appointment as Assistant Advocate General of Haryana, Sangwan shifted his practice to the Punjab and Haryana High Court at Chandigarh in 1989 and was promoted to Deputy Advocate General in 1990.

He was elevated as an Additional Judge of the Punjab and Haryana High Court on 10 July 2017 and was sworn in as a Permanent Judge on 3 December 2018. He was transferred to the Allahabad High Court on 2 November 2023.
