= Tej Pratap Tiwari =

Judge of The High Court of Judicature at Allahabad

Judge of Allahabad High Court
- Incumbent
- Assumed office 7 August 2025
- Nominated by: Sanjiv Khanna
- Appointed by: Droupadi Murmu

Personal details
- Born: 2 August 1971 (age 55)
- Education: Lucknow University

Tej Pratap Tiwari (born 2 August 1971) is an Indian judge, currently serving on the Allahabad High Court in the state of Uttar Pradesh.

== Career ==
Manoj Kumar graduated in Law from Lucknow University in 1987. He enrolled as an Advocate in 1997. He served as the secretary of the U.P. State Legal Services Authority from 2012 to 2016. He took oath as Permanent Judge on August 7, 2025.
