= B. R. Gavai =

52nd Chief Justice of India (from May to November 2025)

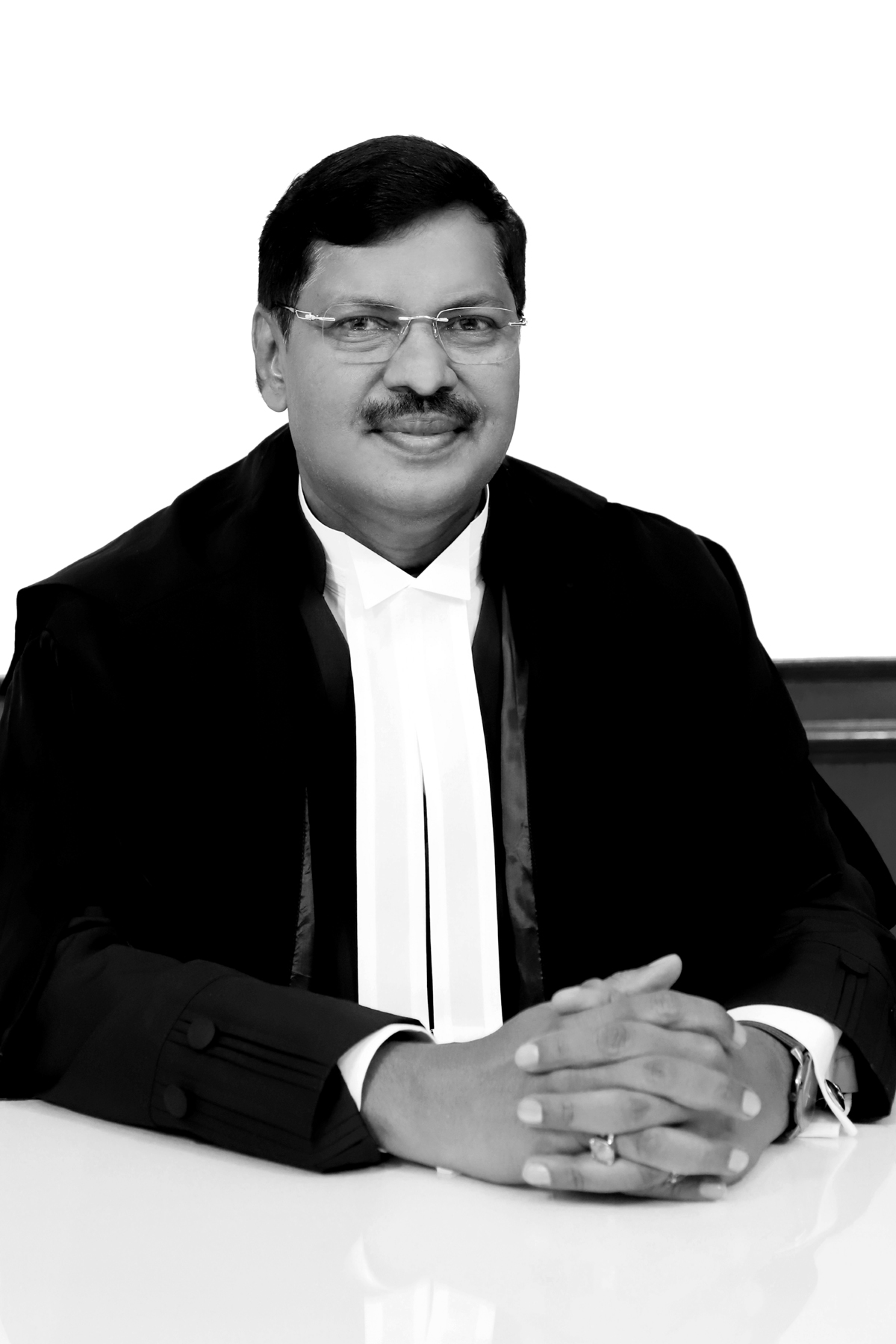
- Former Chief Justice of India BR Gavai

52nd Chief Justice of India
- In office 14 May 2025 – 23 November 2025
- Appointed by: Droupadi Murmu
- Preceded by: Sanjiv Khanna
- Succeeded by: Surya Kant

Judge of Supreme Court of India
- In office 24 May 2019 – 13 May 2025
- Nominated by: Ranjan Gogoi
- Appointed by: Ram Nath Kovind

Judge of Bombay High Court
- In office 14 November 2003 – 23 May 2019
- Nominated by: Vishweshwar Nath Khare
- Appointed by: A. P. J. Abdul Kalam

Personal details
- Born: Bhushan Ramkrishna Gavai; 24 November 1960 (age 65) Amravati, Maharashtra, India
- Parent: R. S. Gavai (father)
- Education: Amravati University, (BCom, LLB)

Bhushan Ramkrishna Gavai (born 24 November 1960) is a retired Indian jurist who had served as the 52nd Chief Justice of India (CJI) from 14 May to 23 November 2025. He is a former judge of the Bombay High Court and also served as the chancellor of some National Law Universities (NLUs). He is the second-ever CJI to be from the Scheduled Castes. During his term as CJI, he also served as ex officio patron-in-chief of the National Legal Services Authority.

== Early life and education ==
Gavai was born on 24 November 1960 in Amravati, Maharashtra, and studied at a primary municipal school in Amravati. He then studied at Chikitsak Samuha Shirolkar Madhyamik Shala and at Holy Name High School in Mumbai. After earning degrees in commerce and in law from Amravati University, he joined the legal profession in 1985.

== Career ==
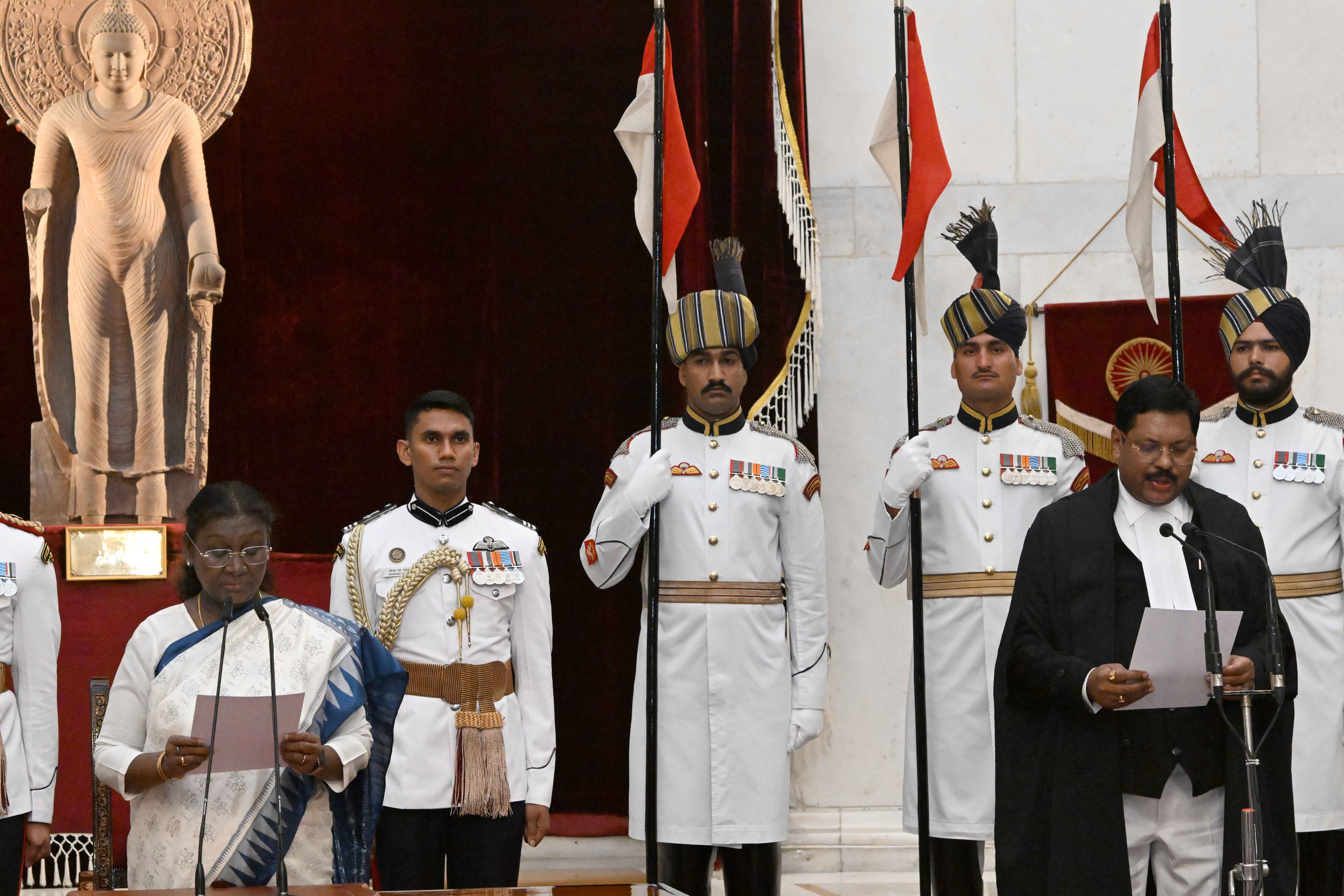
President Droupadi Murmu administering the oath of office to Justice BR Gavai as the Chief Justice of India on 14 May 2025.

Gavai worked with Bar under Raja S. Bhonsale, former advocate general and judge of the High Court. He practiced independently at Bombay High Court (HC) from 1987 to 1990. After 1990, he practiced mainly before the Nagpur Bench of the Bombay HC. He also practiced constitutional law and administrative law.

Gavai was standing counsel for the Nagpur Municipal Corporation, Amravati Municipal Corporation, and Amravati University. He regularly represented as counsel various autonomous bodies and corporations like SICOM, DCVL, etc., and various municipal councils in the Vidarbha region. He was appointed as assistant government pleader and additional public prosecutor in the Bombay HC's Nagpur Bench, from August 1992 to July 1993. Later, he was appointed as government pleader and public prosecutor for the Nagpur Bench on 17 January 2000. He was elevated as an additional judge of the High Court on 14 November 2003. On 12 November 2005, he became a permanent judge of the Bombay HC. After serving as a HC judge for 14 years, he was appointed as a judge of the Supreme Court of India on 24 May 2019, a position he held until 13 May 2025.

On 14 May 2025, Justice Bhushan Ramkrishna Gavai was sworn in as the 52nd Chief Justice of India by President Droupadi Murmu. He was the first Chief Justice of India from the Buddhist community. He was also the second Dalit (Scheduled Caste) to hold the office, following Justice K. G. Balakrishnan, who previously served as Chief Justice from 2007 to 2010. As of January 2025, the Supreme Court of India had three sitting judges from the Scheduled Castes – Justice Gavai, Justice C. T. Ravikumar, and Justice Prasanna Varale. This marked the highest representation of the SC community in the history of the Supreme Court. Notably, both Justice B. R. Gavai and Justice Prasanna Varale belong to the Buddhist faith, making it the first time in the Court's history that two Buddhist judges served simultaneously. Justice Gavai retired on 23 November 2025, and was succeeded by Justice Surya Kant.

In January 2026, Gavai participated as an eminent jurist in the Vasudhaiva Kutumbakam Ki Oar 4.0 conclave, held from 16 to 22 January at August Kranti Maidan, Mumbai, organised by Jyot India Foundation with support from the Ministry of External Affairs and themed around India's constitutional transition.

== Notable judgements ==
Justice B.R. Gavai has authored and contributed to several landmark decisions of the Supreme Court of India. His judgments span a wide range of constitutional, criminal, and administrative matters.

=== Article 370 abrogation ===
Justice Gavai was a member of the five-judge Constitution Bench that upheld the abrogation of Article 370, which granted special status to the erstwhile state of Jammu and Kashmir. The Court ruled unanimously that the Presidential orders and the subsequent changes by Parliament were constitutionally valid. The Bench also directed that statehood be restored and that elections be conducted by September 2024.

=== Electoral bonds scheme struck down ===
In Association for Democratic Reforms v. Union of India, Justice Gavai was part of the Constitution Bench that unanimously struck down the Electoral Bonds Scheme, holding it to be violative of citizens' right to information under Article 19(1)(a) of the Constitution.

=== Bulldozer demolitions without due process ===
Justice Gavai co-authored a decision that condemned demolition of homes of accused persons by state authorities without following due process. The Court held that such actions violated the principles of the rule of law and separation of powers.

=== Sub-classification among scheduled castes ===
Justice Gavai was part of the seven-judge Constitution Bench in State of Punjab v. Davinder Singh, which held that sub-classification among Scheduled Castes for more equitable affirmative action is permissible. He emphasized the need to identify and exclude the creamy layer within SC/ST categories to ensure substantive equality.

=== Stay on conviction of Rahul Gandhi ===
In 2023, Justice Gavai was part of the Bench that stayed the conviction of Rahul Gandhi in a criminal defamation case. The Court noted that the conviction had far-reaching consequences, including disqualification from Parliament.

=== Presidential reference ===
The Supreme Court, in a unanimous advisory opinion on Presidential Reference No. 1 of 2025, held that courts cannot impose timelines on the President or Governors to act on bills, rejected the idea of deemed assent, and concluded that gubernatorial and presidential actions under Articles 200 and 201 are generally non-justiciable before a bill becomes law, subject to a narrow exception for prolonged constitutional inaction inviting limited directions to act.

== Personal life ==
Bhushan Ramkrishna Gavai was born to Ramkrishna Suryabhan Gavai and Kamala on 24 November 1960. His father led the Republican Party of India (Gavai) faction and had been an MP and Governor. His daughter Karishma Gavai works as an assistant professor in National Law University, Nagpur. His brother Rajendra Gavai is also a politician. His family is inspired by B. R. Ambedkar and follows Buddhism.

== Controversies ==
In September 2025, CJI Gavai created controversy and received severe criticism on social media for his remarks in a public interest litigation (PIL) case concerning the restoration of an idol of the Hindu god Vishnu damaged during the Mughal invasions at a temple in the Khajuraho complex in Madhya Pradesh. Gavai mocked the petition by calling it a "Publicity Interest Litigation". He told the petitioner, "Go and ask the deity himself to do something. If you say that you are a staunch devotee of Lord Vishnu, then pray and meditate." However, CJI Gavai later clarified that he respects all religions.

On 6 October 2025, advocate Rakesh Kishore attempted to attack Gavai with a shoe, outraged over his remarks on Vishnu and "insult to Sanatana Dharma". While being made to leave the court, Kishore made the statement, "Sanatan Dharam Ka Apman, Nahi Sahega Hindustan" (India will not tolerate an insult to Sanatan Dharam).
