= Vivek Kumar Birla =

Indian Judge

Judge of Allahabad High Court
- In office 3 February 2014 – 17 September 2025
- Nominated by: Sanjiv Khanna
- Appointed by: Pranab Mukherjee

Personal details
- Born: September 18, 1963 (age 62)

Vivek Kumar Birla (born 18 September 1963) is a retired Indian judge, who served as the Judge of Allahabad High Court.

== Career ==
Vivek Kumar Birla was elevated as Additional Judge of the Allahabad High Court on 3 February 2014 and was appointed as permanent Judge on 1 February 2016. Later he joined as the administrative judge for the Aligarh district court. He retired from the Judiciary on 17 September 2025.
