= State of Punjab v. Davinder Singh =

2024 Indian Supreme Court case

The State of Punjab v. Davinder Singh
- Court: Supreme Court of India
- Full case name: The State of Punjab & Ors. v. Davinder Singh & Ors.
- Decided: 1 August 2024
- Citation: 2024 INSC 562
- Transcripts: (Indian Kanoon) (SCObserver)

Case history
- Prior actions: Appeal against the judgment of the Punjab and Haryana High Court which had struck down Section 4(5) of the Punjab Scheduled Castes and Backward Classes (Reservation in Services) Act, 2006, relying on E. V. Chinnaiah v. State of Andhra Pradesh.

Court membership
- Judges sitting: D. Y. Chandrachud (CJI), B. R. Gavai, Vikram Nath, Bela M. Trivedi, Pankaj Mithal, Manoj Misra, and Satish Chandra Sharma

Case opinions
- Decision by: D. Y. Chandrachud
- Concurrence: B. R. Gavai, Vikram Nath, Pankaj Mithal, Manoj Misra, and Satish Chandra Sharma
- Dissent: Bela M. Trivedi

Laws applied
- This case overturned a previous ruling
- E. V. Chinnaiah v. State of Andhra Pradesh

The State of Punjab v. Davinder Singh., 2024 INSC 562, is a landmark Supreme Court of India judgment by a seven-judge Constitution bench, which held that state governments have the power to create sub-classifications within the Scheduled Castes (SCs) and Scheduled Tribes (STs) for the purpose of reservation in public employment and education. In a 6:1 majority verdict delivered on 1 August 2024, the Court overruled its previous 2004 decision in E. V. Chinnaiah v. State of Andhra Pradesh, which had held that Scheduled Castes form a homogenous group and cannot be subdivided for reservation benefits. The judgement affirmed state's power to make sub-classifications for the benefit of the most disadvantaged groups within the SC and ST lists under Articles 15 and 16 of the Constitution of India, acknowledging that judicial decisions should not be divorced from 'social and economic reality'.

== Background ==
The case originated from a 1975 notification by the Punjab government that allocated 50% of the reserved seats for Scheduled Castes to the Valmiki and Mazhabi Sikh communities, which were considered the most backward among the SCs in the state.

In 2000, Andhra Pradesh legislature passed a similar law called "Andhra Pradesh Scheduled Castes (Rationalisation of Reservations) Act, 2000" organising SCs into sub-groups. However, the constitutionality of this law was challenged in the High Court, where it was upheld, and appealed to Supreme Court of India. In 2004, a five-judge bench of the Supreme Court in its judgement E. V. Chinnaiah v. State of Andhra Pradesh, held that the President's list of Scheduled Castes under Article 341 constitutes a single, homogenous group, struck down the law as unconstitutional.

Following the Chinnaiah decision, the Punjab government passed the Punjab Scheduled Castes and Backward Classes (Reservation in Services) Act, 2006 in which Section 4(5) codified the "first-preference" reservation policy from 1975. The constitutionality of the act was challenged by the Chamar Mahasabha represented by Davinder Singh, and it was struck down by the Punjab and Haryana High Court in several rulings relying on precedent in Chinnaiah. The state subsequently appealed the high court ruling in the Supreme Court which was heard by a five-judge bench in 2020 led by Justice Arun Mishra and comprising Justices Indira Banerjee, Vineet Saran, M.R. Shah, and Aniruddha Bose.

The division bench of the Supreme Court, hearing the appeal, expressed doubt about the correctness of the Chinnaiah verdict, noting its inconsistency with the principles laid down by a larger nine-judge bench in Indra Sawhney & Others v. Union of India. The bench observed that both caste and class are dynamic, and that the benefits of reservation were often being cornered by a few dominant castes within the SC list, leaving the most marginalized without representation. Consequently, the matter was referred to a seven-judge bench to authoritatively decide the issue.

== Judgment ==
The seven-judge bench, headed by Chief Justice D. Y. Chandrachud, delivered its judgment on 1 August 2024, with a 6:1 majority after hearing the arguments for three days. The majority opinion, authored by Chandrachud, held that the sub-classification of Scheduled Castes and Scheduled Tribes is constitutionally permissible. Justices B. R. Gavai, Vikram Nath, Pankaj Mithal, Manoj Misra, and Satish Chandra Sharma wrote separate, concurring opinions.

=== Majority opinion ===
The judgment located the state's authority to sub-classify within Articles 15 and 16 of the Constitution, which it described as enabling provisions for the state to create special measures for backward classes. The Court distinguished this legislative power from the President's distinct power under Article 341, which is limited to identifying which castes are included in the SC list. The states, the Court held, are empowered to apportion reservation benefits among those identified castes to ensure equitable outcomes. Based on this reasoning, the majority explicitly overruled the five-judge bench decision in E.V. Chinnaiah, stating its interpretation was flawed because it did not recognize that equality principles require the state to address inequalities even within a broader class. However, the Court mandated that any such sub-classification by a state must be justified by quantifiable and empirical data that demonstrates the relative backwardness of a subgroup and its inadequate representation in public service. In a further significant observation, the majority also endorsed the application of the "creamy layer" exclusion principle to Scheduled Castes and Scheduled Tribes to ensure affirmative action benefits reach the most deserving members of these communities.

=== Dissenting opinion ===
Justice Bela M. Trivedi delivered the sole dissenting opinion. She argued that the Constitution makers intended the Scheduled Castes list to be a single, homogenous class for the purpose of reservations. In her view, any sub-classification by states would amount to tinkering with the Presidential list under Article 341, a power exclusively vested in the Parliament of India. She opined that allowing states to sub-classify would lead to political fragmentation and that the E.V. Chinnaiah judgment laid down the correct position of law.

== Significance ==
The judgment is considered a major development in India's reservation jurisprudence. It empowers state governments to implement targeted affirmative action policies focusing on the most deprived sections within the Scheduled Castes and Scheduled Tribes. By allowing sub-quotas, the verdict aims to ensure a more equitable distribution of reservation benefits, which were allegedly being disproportionately accessed by more advanced groups within these communities.

The decision has also sparked debate on federalism. By interpreting Articles 15 and 16 as independent sources of legislative power for states to sub-classify, some legal analysts argue the Court has created potential for conflicts between Union and state laws concerning social welfare policies.

The Court's strong endorsement of applying the creamy layer principle to SCs/STs is another significant outcome, potentially paving the way for future legislative or judicial action to exclude the most affluent individuals from the ambit of reservation.

== See also ==
- Reservation in India
- E. V. Chinnaiah v. State of Andhra Pradesh
- Indra Sawhney & Others v. Union of India
- Scheduled Castes and Scheduled Tribes
