= Prashant Bhushan =

Indian activist, lawyer and politician (born 1956)

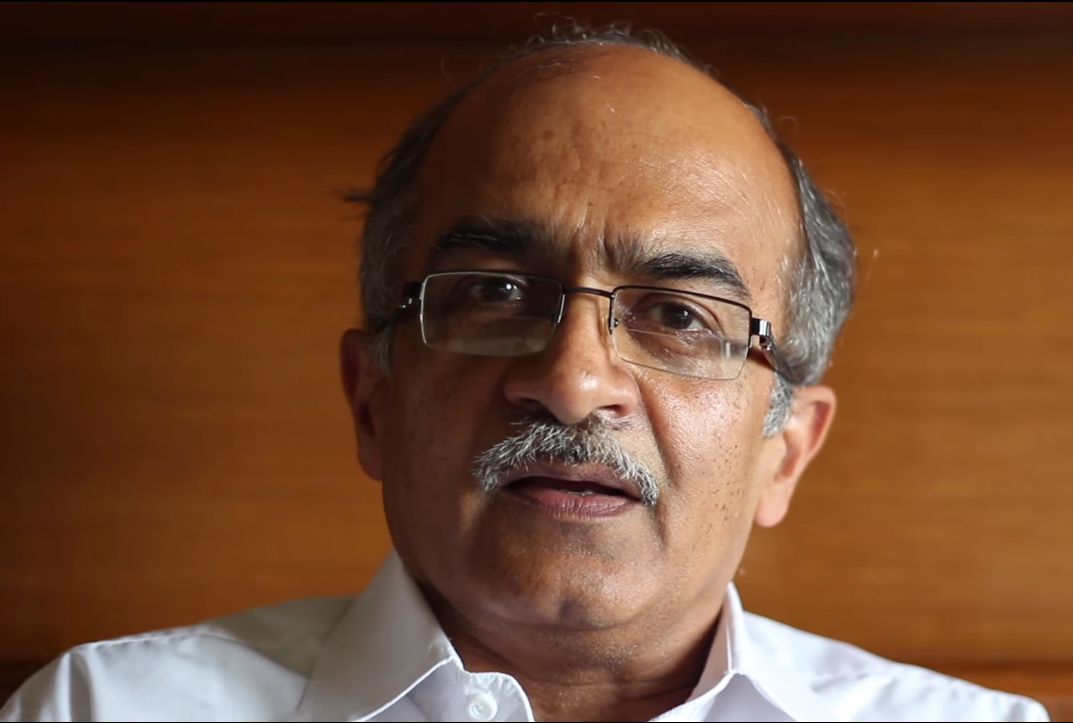
- Born: 15 October 1956 (age 70); Allahabad, Uttar Pradesh, India
- Education: IIT Madras (dropout); Allahabad University (BA, LLB), Princeton University (MA)
- Occupation: Advocate-on-Record
- Spouse: Deepa Bhushan
- Children: 3

Prashant Bhushan (born 15 October 1956) is an Indian author and a public interest lawyer in the Supreme Court of India. He was a member of the faction of the India Against Corruption (IAC) movement known as Team Anna which supported Anna Hazare's campaign for the implementation of the Jan Lokpal Bill. After a split in IAC, he helped Team Anna form the Aam Aadmi Party. In 2015, he made several allegations against the party's leadership, its functioning and its deviation from the core ideology, values and commitments. He is one of the founders of Swaraj Abhiyan and Sambhaavnaa, an Institute of Public Policy and Politics.

== Early life and education ==
Prashant Bhushan is the oldest of the three children of Shanti Bhushan and Kumud Bhushan. His father was a lawyer-activist and a former Union Law Minister in the Morarji Desai government.

Bhushan was educated at St. Joseph's High School, Prayagraj, and at the St Joseph's College, Allahabad. Bhushan, who dropped out of IIT Madras after first semester and briefly attended Princeton University has a degree in law from Allahabad University. While still a student, Bhushan wrote The Case That Shook India, a book on the case that set aside Indira Gandhi's election in 1974. Bhushan has a B.A. and LL.B. degree from Allahabad University. He dropped out of Princeton University's Ph.D. program, but was granted an M.A. in philosophy of science in 1982.

== Legal activism ==
Bhushan was drawn to public activism, influenced by his father. His main areas of interest have been human rights, environmental protection and accountability of the public servants. He is associated with various organisations, including the Centre for Public Interest Litigation (CPIL), People's Union for Civil Liberties (PUCL), and Transparency International (India). He is also the convenor of the Working Committee of the Campaign for Judicial Accountability and Judicial Reforms.

Bhushan states that he has taken up about 500 cases dealing with "good causes". His family background allowed him to work on a pro-bono basis for such cases: according to him, he effectively spends only 25 per cent of his time on paid cases, charging 5 per cent of what other lawyers charge. He has criticised the other professional lawyers as "amoral" and claims that he never takes up a case unless he feels that his client is "morally right".

=== Judicial accountability ===
Bhushan says that he envisages a transparent and honest legal system, where people can negotiate their own cases without the need of any lawyers. In 1990, he and his father formed the Committee on Judicial Accountability (CJA) to fight corruption in the judiciary. The organisation comprised some lawyers and ex-judges. Prashant Bhushan started focusing more on this issue in 1993, after the Supreme Court Justice V. Ramaswami was not impeached by parliament on corruption charges. In 2007, the Bhushans expanded CJA to include citizens and form the Campaign for Judicial Accountability and Reform (CJAR).

In 2009, Prashant Bhushan represented activist Subhash Chandra Agrawal, asking for the Supreme Court and High Court judges to be brought under RTI. The judges were forced to declare their assets and post it on the court websites.

In a 2009 interview, Bhushan alleged that at least half of the 16 former chief justices in the Supreme Court were corrupt. Harish Salve filed a contempt case against him in 2010, and the Supreme Court asked Bhushan to apologise. In response, Bhushan submitted an explanation stating why he felt those judges were corrupt. The Bhushans noted the difficulty of getting documentary evidence because judges are immune from investigation. V.R. Krishna Iyer, a former Supreme Court judge, said that either the Bhushans should be punished for making "false charges" or an independent authority should be set up to scrutinise their allegations.

Bhushan has recommended amendment to the Contempt of Court Act clause, stating that some of its clauses effectively prevent the press from exposing the corruption in the judiciary. He has also opposed the rule which prevents people from registering a First Information Report against a judge without the permission of the chief justice of India.

=== Government accountability ===
In 1990, Bhushan wrote a book Bofors, the selling of a nation (1990) on the Bofors scandal.

CPIL won a major victory in 2003 when the Supreme Court restrained the Union government from privatising Hindustan Petroleum and Bharat Petroleum without the approval of Parliament. As counsel for the CPIL, Rajinder Sachar and Bhushan argued that the only way to disinvest in the companies would be to repeal or amend the Acts by which they were nationalised in the 1970s.

Bhushan represented the CPIL in a petition asking for the removal of Neera Yadav from office as Chief Secretary of Uttar Pradesh for alleged corruption. Yadav had been named in five CBI corruption cases and 23 departmental proceedings. In October 2005 the Supreme Court directed the Mulayam Singh state government to remove her from her position. The case became the first in which an Indian Administrative Service officer in Uttar Pradesh was convicted of corruption.

In February 2006, as counsel for Lok Sevak Sangh, Bhushan submitted to the Supreme Court that the MP Local Area Development Scheme (MPLADS) might not be constitutionally valid. A TV channel had recently aired video of a sting in which it appeared that some MPs had taken bribes under the scheme. Bhushan said none of the normal controls were being applied, and the scheme was breeding corruption. The same year, Bhushan also represented the CPIL in a petition alleging that PepsiCo and Coca-Cola were failing to warn the public of harmful ingredients in their beverages, and were luring young children through misleading advertising.

Bhushan filed a PIL challenging the appointment of P.J. Thomas as Central Vigilance Commissioner, after Thomas had been charged in the Palmolein Oil Import Scam. In March 2011, SC struck down the appointment.

Prashant Bhushan acted for the CPIL when it took the lead in filing a suit against the Government of India for irregularities in a major award of spectrum for 2G mobile telephones. The CPIL petition alleged that the government had lost $15.53 billion by issuing spectrum in 2008 based on 2001 prices, and by not following a competitive bidding process. The Supreme Court asked the CBI to probe the irregularities in the auction of 2G spectrum. The inquiry resulted in the resignation of the telecom minister A. Raja, who was later arrested along with others including the DMK MP Kanimozhi, officials of Unitech wireless and officials of Reliance ADAG. In September 2011 Bhushan presented evidence that appeared to disprove the claim by the CBI that Dayanidhi Maran, the former telecom minister, had not applied undue pressure to the owner of Aircel to sell to the Maxis group of Malaysia. Bhushan said the CBI's investigation had been "less than honest". In January 2012 Bhushan questioned why the CBI had failed to lay charges under the Prevention of Corruption Act against companies such as Essar Group and Loop Mobile despite strong evidence against them. In February 2012 the Supreme Court declared the allocation of spectrum had been illegal.

In 2012, Bhushan filed a PIL seeking cancelation of coal block allocations by the government on the grounds that certain companies had been illegally favoured by the politicians. In response to the PIL, the Supreme Court (SC) scrutinised coal block allocation since 1993. Bhushan also filed a PIL against illegal iron ore extraction in Goa, which led to the Supreme Court halting all the mining operations in the state.

He successfully challenged the prime minister and home minister's decision to appoint PJ Thomas as the head of the Central Vigilance Commission (CVC). Acting on his PIL, SC directed the CVC to apprise it of actions taken on complaints by whistleblowers in the country.

Prashant Bhushan also represents whisteblower Anand Rai in the ongoing PIL regarding Vyapam scam in the Supreme Court.

Before K V Chowdary's appointment Prashant Bhushan raised a red flag, asking the prime minister not to go ahead with his appointment, raising severe objections on Chowdary's tenure as CBDT Chief. After Chowdary being appointed, NGO Common Cause represented by Prashant Bhushan has filed a petition in Supreme Court of India challenging K V Chowdary's appointment as CVC and T M Bhasin's appointment as VC on 22 July.

Bhushan argued the Electoral Bonds case representing Association for Democratic Reforms, thereby successfully getting the scheme declared unconstitutional by the Supreme Court of India.

Bhushan's role in some public-interest litigations has also attracted judicial criticism. In April 2018, the Supreme Court dismissed petitions seeking an investigation into the death of special CBI court judge B. H. Loya and criticised Bhushan and the Centre for Public Interest Litigation (CPIL), stating that attempts had been made to misrepresent and mislead the court. Bhushan rejected the criticism, saying that the court had unjustly imputed motives to him and CPIL. In January 2024, the Supreme Court dismissed a petition argued by Bhushan on behalf of a businessman, describing it as a personal-interest petition presented as a public-interest litigation.

=== Naxalism ===
Prashant Bhushan has criticised the use of violence against the Naxal insurgents in the tribal-dominated areas. He has alleged that the actual intention of the Operation Green Hunt was to clear the tribal lands for mining operations and industrialisation. According to him, the rapid industrialization has led to "destructive development" in the tribal areas through pollution and displacement of people.

After the April 2010 Maoist attack in Dantewada, which led to the death of 76 policemen, he stated that such "retaliation" was expected because the government had declared the anti-Naxal operations as a war. He stated that to de-escalate the situation, the government should suspend the armed operations against the Naxals, and instead focus on providing food and infrastructure to the tribals.

In April 2012 Bhushan drew criticism from Congress leaders when he refused to act as a mediator in negotiating with Maoists who were holding a District Collector hostage. He appealed to the Maoists to release the Govt. officer without conditions. He also said that the government should investigate and address legitimate demands.

=== Death penalty ===
Bhushan is against death penalty, and spoke against the hanging of Ajmal Kasab, who was the lone captured terrorist in the 2008 Mumbai attacks. Along with Nitya Ramakrishnan, he was the counsel for the banned documentary 13 December, which is a reconstruction of the events that led to the attacks on Parliament, based on the chargesheet filed by the special police cell.

=== Other issues ===
In 1990, he successfully got the criminal liability aspect in the Bhopal gas tragedy reopened by SC, by challenging the settlement in the case of compensation to the victims. This reopened the case against the former chairman of Union Carbide Corporation Warren Anderson (now deceased).

Bhushan assisted the Narmada Bachao Andolan activists opposed to the Sardar Sarovar Dam. After six years of hearings, in October 2000 the Supreme Court ruled to allow the massive project to recommence. Bhushan criticised the decision for having been made "without any evidence of the facts [being presented] before the judges". In February 2001 a criminal petition was filed with the Supreme Court of India accusing Medha Patkar, Prashant Bhushan and Arundhati Roy of contempt of court for having demonstrated in front of the Supreme Court in protest against the judgement on the Sardar Sarovar dam. Bhushan defended Arundhati Roy when she was charged with contempt of court for publicly criticising judges in the dam hearings. In March 2002 she was sentenced to one day in jail. According to Bhushan the judges were "just affronted by the fact that somebody has dared to criticise them".

Bhushan is opposed to the Indo-US civilian nuclear agreement. He is opposed to nuclear energy and supported the People's Movement Against Nuclear Energy against establishment of the Kudankulam Nuclear Power Plant.

In August 2015, Bhushan filed a PIL in the Supreme Court against the alleged corruption and nepotism in the selection of lower court judges in the Delhi Judicial Services Examination conducted in October 2014. As a result of the PIL, the Supreme Court ordered that the papers be checked by P. V. Reddi, a former SC judge and former Law Commission Chairman Justice. He subsequently recommended that 12 more judges should be inducted into the services. The Supreme Court has to issue guidelines for long-term systemic reform such as increasing transparency in the recruitment procedures.

The attorney general of India and the Government of India initiated contempt proceedings against advocate Bhushan for his tweets on 1 February 2019 in relation to the hearings before the Supreme Court of India in the case involving appointment of CBI chief. Later, however, the Attorney General sought to withdraw the proceedings, indicating that the comments had been a "genuine mistake" by Bhushan.

In August 2020, the Supreme Court of India held that Bhushan was guilty of contempt of court, in relation to two posts made by him on Twitter. The first post was a criticism of the role played by the previous four chief justices of India, and the second criticised the chief justice of India in relation to a photograph of him posing on a motorcycle without a mask while the court was in lockdown during the COVID-19 pandemic in India. Justice Arun Mishra, writing for the bench, held that these tweets were not just personal opinions, and that they tended to "shake the public confidence in the institution of judiciary". The proceedings were criticised widely by multiple former judges of the Supreme Court and High Courts, including Supreme Court Justices Kurian Joseph, Ruma Pal, G.S. Singhvi, A.K. Ganguly, Gopala Gowda, Aftab Alam, Jasti Chelameswar and Vikramjit Sen. Bhushan was also supported with statements published by senior advocates and civil servants. During the proceedings, the attorney general of India had objected to the Supreme Court, noting that contempt proceedings required his consent, which had not been obtained in this case. The Supreme Court declined to hear him and initially published an order that did not record his appearance, although it was later amended to correct this error. On 31 August 2020, the Supreme Court fined him ₹1 for contempt of court, which he paid the same day.

His anti-vaccine tweets and criticism of mask mandates has invited him heavy criticism from across the political spectrum in India.

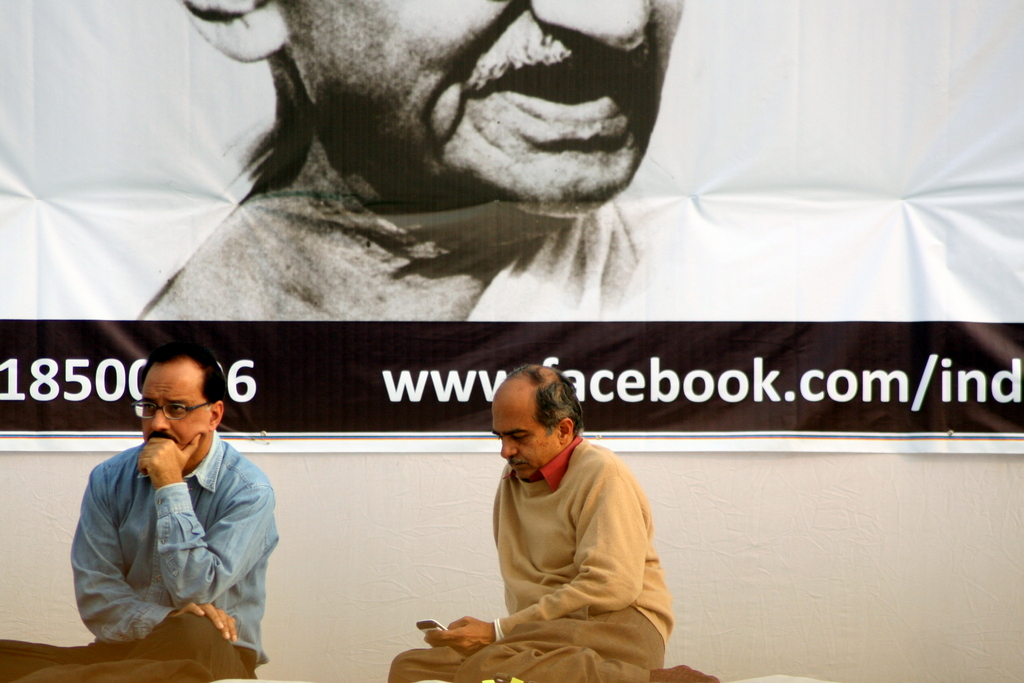
Prashant Bhushan on Fast

== Team Anna and Jan Lokpal movement ==
In 2010, there were a series of anti-corruption demonstrations in India, after high-profile cases like Commonwealth Games scam and Adarsh scam were highlighted in the media. An anti-corruption crusade which included a demand for a Jan Lokpal Bill took place and became known as the India Against Corruption movement. Prashant Bhushan was one of the several activists who participated in the anti-corruption crusade.

In March, the prime minister's office (PMO) invited Hazare, the most prominent leader of the movement, for talks. Prashant Bhushan and his father Shanti Bhushan, along with Swami Agnivesh and Kiran Bedi, accompanied Hazare to the meeting. Subsequently, in April 2011, Hazare nominated the Bhushans as members of the joint committee constituted to draft a final version of the Lokpal Bill.

A few days after the committee began work, a CD was released that appeared to be a recording of conversation between Shanti Bhushan and Amar Singh of the Samajwadi Party. The recording, related to 2G spectrum case, would discredit Shanti Bhushan, if found to be genuine. Prashant Bhushan stated that labs had shown the CD was doctored, and that its purpose was to obstruct the anti-corruption movement. Later, Singh claimed that Bhushan telephoned him and tried to stop him from talking, a charge which Bhushan denied.

The committee met the government representatives several times to discuss the proposed bill. Prashant Bhushan stated that the Lokpal should have full autonomy and power to prosecute all public servants, and that this principle was non-negotiable. Team Anna activists disagreed with the government's attempt to keep the prime minister out of the Lokpal's purview. The government did not want the Lokpal to have the power to investigate the prime minister, the higher judiciary, the defence services, the CBI and the CVC and the conduct of MPs inside Parliament. The government's draft of the bill also excluded several other Lokpal powers proposed by Team Anna's draft such as the powers to tap phones.

On 4 August 2011, the government's version of the Lokpal bill was tabled in the Lok Sabha. Prashant Bhushan and other IAC activists criticised the bill as weak, stating that it would provide protection to the corrupt officials. Hazare staged a demonstration against the government's version of the bill, but was detained. The other activists, including Prashant Bhushan, then organised peaceful protests across the country. Following a hunger strike by Hazare and more failed negotiations with the government representatives, a section of Team Anna activists led by Kejriwal and Bhushan decided to enter politics to pass the bill themselves.

=== Himachal land controversy ===
In 2011, the Congress leader Digvijaya Singh alleged that the two Bhushans had failed to pay taxes due when they bought an investment property in Allahabad. Bhushan denied the charge, calling it a "very organised and concerted attempt to smear members of the civil society in the Lokpal drafting committee with allegations".

In a similar accusation, the former BJP Chief Minister, Prem Kumar Dhumal, had rejected those charges, defending the grant of relaxations to the educational trust.

=== Kashmir issue controversy ===
In 2011, at a press conference in Varanasi, Bhushan stated that he wanted the Armed Forces Special Powers Act to be revoked in Jammu and Kashmir. He added that the government should try to persuade the people of the Kashmir valley to align with India but that they should be allowed to separate if they wish to do so. On 12 October 2011, he was attacked by the members of Bhagat Singh Kranti Sena inside the Supreme Court complex, for these remarks. The group accused him of trying to break up India. He was dragged out of his chair, and repeatedly kicked and punched. Bhushan described his attackers as having a "fascist mindset" and stood by his statements. Several politicians and activists condemned the attack on Bhushan, while some others criticised him. The Shiv Sena called for a police case to be registered against Bhushan, accusing him of supporting the anti-national elements. Hazare distanced Team Anna from Bhushan's remarks, saying that these were his personal views.

== Political views ==
Bhushan had long been a critic of the United Progressive Alliance (UPA) government. In 2012, he co-founded the Aam Aadmi Party, stating that the other political parties were corrupt.

Bhushan accused BJP's prime ministerial candidate Narendra Modi of being corrupt and a "puppet" of Reliance Industries. He also accused RSS of supporting terror activities, and criticised BJP for its association with the RSS.

Before the 2015 Delhi elections, Bhushan accused party's chief Arvind Kejriwal of selecting candidates of his own choice. After the elections, on 4 March 2015, Bhushan and Yogendra Yadav were voted out of Political Affairs Committee of Aam Aadmi Party for alleged anti-party activities and for working toward the party's defeat in the Delhi elections. Both Bhushan and Yadav denied the charges. On 28 March 2015, they were dropped from the National Executive Council of the AAP following a vote, at a meeting the conduct of which was afterwards disputed by Bhushan. He and Yadav then formed a new political movement called Swaraj Abhiyan. In April 2015, they were expelled from the party by AAP's disciplinary committee.

=== Views on calls for regime change ===
In October 2026, Prashant Bhushan described the protests over alleged irregularities in the revision of electoral rolls as a “fight for regime change” and said that seeking a change of government was a democratic right. Speaking at a press conference in New Delhi, he linked the demand to concerns about electoral democracy and the government's handling of the protests. The Bharatiya Janata Party (BJP) criticised the remarks, alleging that the agitation was intended to remove the government without an electoral mandate.

== Personal life ==
Prashant Bhushan is married to Deepa Bhushan, a former lawyer. The couple has three sons.

== Bibliography ==
- Bhushan, Prashant (1978). The Case That Shook India. Vikas Pub. House. p. 294. ISBN 0-7069-0594-6.
- Bhushan, Prashant (1990). Bofors, the selling of a nation. Vision Books. p. 275. ISBN 81-7094-066-4.
