= Contempt of court in India =

In India, the offence of contempt of court is committed when a person either disobeys a court order (civil contempt), or when a person says or does anything that scandalizes, prejudices, or interferes with judicial proceedings and the administration of justice (criminal contempt). Contempt of court can be punished with imprisonment or a fine, or both.

== History and legislation ==
The offence of contempt of courts was established in common law, and can also be traced to colonial legislation, with the earliest recorded penalties contained in the Regulating Act 1773, which stated that the newly formed Mayor's Court of Calcutta would have the same powers as a court of the English King's Bench to punish persons for contempt. Courts established in India under colonial rule followed the common law principle that all "courts of record" had the inherent power to punish for contempt. High courts established in Bombay, Calcutta, and Madras as courts of record subsequently exercised the power of contempt to penalise persons for interfering with the administration of justice.

The Contempt of Courts Act 1926 was enacted to resolve a conflict of opinions between high courts in India on whether they had the power to penalise offences of contempt committed against other, subordinate courts that fell under their jurisdiction. The 1926 act specifically affirmed this power, and allowed the high courts to penalise contempt against subordinate courts as well as against their own judgments and proceedings. In 1952, the Contempt of Courts Act was replaced by a new legislation of the same name, which expanded the power to punish for contempt from high courts to other courts as well.

The Constitution of India, enacted in 1950, specifically established the Supreme Court of India as well as high courts in the states of India as courts of record with the power to punish for acts of contempt. Contempt of court is also a ground on which the right to freedom of speech in India can be restricted.

In 1961, a committee headed by H. N. Sanyal, an additional solicitor general for the government of India, was appointed to examine the application of contempt laws in India. The Sanyal Committee recommended that contempt proceedings should be initiated not by the courts themselves, but on the recommendation of a law officer of the government. These recommendations were incorporated in the Contempt of Courts Act 1971, enacted by the Parliament of India, which is the current legislation governing contempt of courts in India. The Contempt of Courts Act 1971 defines civil and criminal contempt, and lays down the powers and procedures by which courts can penalise contempt, as well as the penalties that can be given for the offence of contempt. The act was amended in 2006, to limit the power of courts to punish for contempt, only when such contempt "interfered with the due course of justice", and to allow truth as a defense to contempt.

== Commission of contempt of court ==
The Contempt of Courts Act 1971 categorises the offence of contempt into civil and criminal contempt. The act specifies that high courts and the Supreme Court of India have the power to try and punish the offence of contempt, and high courts have the power to punish acts of contempt against courts subordinate to them; however, the Supreme Court of India has clarified that any court of record has the inherent power to punish for contempt. In addition to these courts, certain administrative tribunals also have been given the power to punish for contempt, in their governing statutes.

=== Civil contempt ===
Civil contempt, defined in Section 2(b) of the Contempt of Courts Act, is "wilful disobedience to any judgment, decree, direction, order, writ or other process of a court or wilful breach of an undertaking given to a court".

=== Criminal contempt ===
Criminal contempt, defined in Section 2(c), is committed when anything is published, or done, which "scandalises, or tends to scandalise, or lowers or tends to lower the authority of, any court", or "prejudices, or interferes or tends to interfere with, the due course of any judicial proceeding", or "interferes or tends to interfere with, or obstructs or tends to obstruct, the administration of justice in any other manner". The offence of criminal contempt has been held to cover false statements made to or about the judiciary, coercion and attempts to pervert judicial proceedings by attacking witnesses, parties, or judges, recording court proceedings without permission from the court, obstructing officers of the court from performing their functions, as well as verbal abuse and accusations of incompetence or bias against judges.

=== Procedure ===
The procedure for trying cases of contempt of court is provided in the Contempt of Courts Act 1971. Proceedings can be initiated by courts suo motu, i.e. by themselves, and require a notice in writing to be sent to person alleged to have committed contempt to appear before the court, when the contemptuous act or words occur in the presence of the court. Courts are required to conduct these hearings as soon as possible, and preferably on the same day when it concerns acts of contempt committed in their presence. Persons accused of contempt have the right to be heard in their defence and courts can hear evidence regarding the case as well. Detention in custody is permissible during a trial for contempt.

When contemptuous acts or words are alleged to have occurred outside of a courtroom, proceedings for contempt in the high courts or supreme courts can only be carried out if with the permission of the relevant law officer. In the case of high courts, the consent of the state's advocate general is required, and in the case of the Supreme Court, the consent of either the Attorney General of India or the Solicitor General of India is required. Proceedings for contempt in the Supreme Court are also subject an additional set of regulations, known as the "Rules to Regulate Proceedings for Contempt of Supreme Court".

=== Defenses ===
The Contempt of Courts Act allows three defenses to charges of contempt. It allows an exemption for those who innocently publish or commit acts that would otherwise amount to contempt, if they reasonably believed that there were no ongoing judicial proceedings regarding these acts, or if they reasonably believe that the content of their words or actions did not contain anything contemptuous. The act also specifically exempts fair and accurate reporting on judicial proceedings, and fair criticism of the judiciary. In 2006, the Contempt of Courts Act 1971 was amended to allow truth as a defense to contempt, provided that the person claiming this defence was acting in public interest.

== Punishment and sentencing ==
Both civil and criminal contempt share the same punishment under the Contempt of Courts Act 1971. The act allows for a maximum term of imprisonment for six months, and this can be supplemented with a fine of up to ₹2000. The Contempt of Courts Act 1971 also specifically allows courts to forgo the punishment if an apology is made to the court, and may use their discretion to determine whether the apology has been sufficient.

== Criticism ==
In 1969, a challenge to the constitutional validity of the Contempt of Courts Act 1971 was dismissed by the Supreme Court of India, which found the law to be substantively valid. In 2020, lawyer and activist Prashant Bhushan, along with journalist and politician Arun Shourie, and publisher N. Ram, filed a petition challenging the constitutional validity of the Contempt of Courts Act again

Courts' powers to punish for criminal contempt have been repeatedly criticized by former judges and lawyers as having a chilling effect on freedom of speech, being too broad and vague in its definition and lending itself to misuse to shield the judiciary from criticism. Senior advocate Sanjay Hegde has argued that the offence of "scandalizing the court" is "incapable of precise definition", and that it derives from English law, where it has since been abolished.

In 2011, retired Supreme Court judge and former Press Council of India Chairman, Markandeya Katju, called for amendments to the Contempt of Courts Act 1971 in order to allow the media to report better on law and judiciary-related matters.

In March 2018, the Law Commission of India was tasked by the government of India with re-examining Section 2 of the Contempt of Courts Act 1971, which defines the offence of contempt. The commission was asked to examine a proposal that suggested that contempt of court should be limited to cases of civil contempt, i.e. disobedience of court orders, and should not include the offence of "scandalising the court", i.e. criminal contempt. The commission recommended the retention of the offence of "criminal contempt" in India, noting that courts in India continue to use it widely, unlike other countries in which offences such as "scandalising the court" have fallen into disuse. The commission also noted that the power of courts to penalise contempt was inherent, and would continue to exist even if the act was amended or deleted altogether.

== Notable cases ==
- In 1978, two newspaper editors from the Times of India and the Indian Express were charged with contempt following the publication of articles that contained criticisms of the Supreme Court's decision in ADM Jabalpur v. Shivkant Shukla, a case in which the Supreme Court refused to protect the right to habeas corpus during the Emergency. The case was ultimately dropped after Chief Justice M. H. Beg, who had initiated the proceedings, was not supported by the two other judges on the bench in his opinion that contempt had been committed.
- In 1981, V. K. Krishna Iyer, a former Supreme Court judge, delivered a public speech in which he criticised the functioning of the judiciary in India. The Kerala High Court tried him for criminal contempt after receiving a complaint from a person who heard the speech, but found him not guilty of the charges.
- In 1997, Shiv Sena leader Bal Thackeray was convicted of contempt of court by the Bombay High Court, after he accused a judge of corruption in a public speech. The Supreme Court set aside his conviction on appeal, in 2004.
- In 2010, Communist Party of India (Marxist) leader, M. V. Jayarajan was convicted of contempt of court after he criticized a Kerala High Court decision banning meetings in certain public places. The Kerala High Court sentenced him to six months' imprisonment, which was reduced to four months on appeal to the Supreme Court.
- In 2001, the Delhi High Court issued a notice to editor and journalist Madhu Trehan as well as four other people, in connection with an article published in the (now defunct) magazine, Wah India. The article in question had asked senior advocates in Delhi to anonymously rate Delhi High Court judges on various grounds, including their perceived honesty. The Delhi High Court found them to be guilty of contempt, but accepted an apology and did not penalise the offence.
- In 2002, writer Arundhati Roy was arrested and charged with contempt of court by the Supreme Court of India, after she wrote an article criticising one of the court's judgments concerning the Narmada Dam, and participated in a protest regarding this outside the Court. Following her arrest, Roy made a further statement questioning the Supreme Court's initiation of contempt proceedings against her, and turned down the Court's offer to allow her to escape punishment with an apology. She was imprisoned for one day and fined ₹2,000 (equivalent to ₹7,600 or US$79 in 2023). In 2016, Roy faced contempt of court proceedings again after she criticised the arrest of Delhi University professor G.N. Saibaba, who was jailed for alleged links to Maoists in India.
- In 2003, the Karnataka High Court initiated contempt proceedings against 56 persons, including publishers, editors, and journalists, from 14 publications. These publications had carried reports about an alleged sex scandal in Mysore, in which several High Court judges had been implicated. An investigation cleared the judges of wrongdoing, and the contempt proceedings were eventually stayed.
- In 2011, B. M. Patel was convicted of contempt of court by the Gujarat High Court and sentenced to imprisonment for three months as well as a fine of ₹2000. Patel was convicted in relation to comments he made on the judiciary in connection with an ongoing litigation concerning property. The Gujarat High Court stated that this was only the second time that a conviction had been secured under the Contempt of Courts Act 1971.
- In 2013, Bollywood actor Rajpal Yadav and his wife, Radha Yadav, were both convicted of contempt of court and jailed for ten days, after failing to appear before the Delhi High Court during a suit against them for recovery of debts.
- In 2015, Madras High Court judge, C. S. Karnan, wrote to the Supreme Court, indicating that he would initiate contempt of court proceedings against the then-Chief Justice of India, H. L. Dattu, in the context of an ongoing dispute about the treatment of Dalit judges in the judiciary. The Supreme Court in turn, initiated contempt of court proceedings against Justice Karnan, sentencing him to six months' imprisonment. Justice Karnan initially refused to accept the warrant for his arrest but was later arrested and served the period of imprisonment.
- In October 2018, a Mumbai-based journalist-turned-social activist Ketan Tirodkar was convicted by a three-judge bench of Bombay High Court for Contempt of Court and sentenced to three months imprisonment with a fine of Rs. 2000. A two judge-bench of the Supreme Court of India headed by Justice Kurien Joseph suspended the sentence granting relief to Tirodkar. Tirodkar had allegedly criticised and also moved petitions against the alleged land-grabbing by judges of Bombay High Court. It is pertinent to note that in October 2018 itself; that is the same month when the Bombay High Court had announced a verdict of guilty against Tirodkar; another bench of the same High Court of Bombay had set a law in a PIL filed by Tirodkar that a judge can have only one flat in the State commenting that We have no hesitation to observe that if a person gets theadvantage of allotment of the tenements/houses from the government at a concessional rate on more than one occasion it would amount to nothing else but using office for unjust enrichment". The PIL by Tirodkar had challenged allotment of a plot of land to Surbhi Housing Society formed by Bombay High Court judges.
- In 2020, lawyer and activist Prashant Bhushan was convicted of contempt of court. He had posted a press photograph of the current Chief Justice of India, Sharad Bobde, seated on a motorcycle without a face mask during the COVID-19 pandemic in India, and criticized the judiciary for their selective focus in hearing cases during the lockdown. He declined an offer from the Supreme Court to apologise for these comments. A challenge to the constitutionality of the Contempt of Courts Act, filed by Bhushan and others, is still pending.
- In 2022, senior independent journalist and whistleblower Savukku Shankar was convicted in Suo-moto contempt of court for 6 months of imprisonment. He had said in an interview that "The entire higher judiciary is riddled with corruption". He argued "I stand by what I said" in the trial. He was sent to jail on 15 September 2022.

== Sources ==
- Venugopal, K.K.; Subramaniam, Gopal (2011). Restatement of Indian Law: Contempt of Courts. New Delhi: Indian Law Institute.
- Nair, K Balasankaran (2004). Law of Contempt of Court in India. India: Atlantic Publishers. ISBN 9788126903597.
- Contempt of Courts Act (1971). "(An Act to define and limit the powers of certain courts in punishing contempts of courts and to regulate their procedure in relation thereto) Act 70 of 1971". India Code.
- Law Commission of India (2018). "Report No. 274: Review of the Contempt of Courts Act, 1971 (Limited to Section 2 of the Act)" (PDF). Law Commission of India.
