= Savukku =

Anonymous whistle blowing website

- The website logo which appears as "a silhouette of a cowboy on horse with the whip".

- Screenshot of the homepage of the website.
- Website type: Whistle blowing blog
- Available in: Tamil, English
- Owner: Savukku Shankar
- Creator: Many
- Website: savukkuonline.com
- Commercial: No
- Launched: September 2010; 16 years ago
- Current status: offline

Savukku (English: Whip) is an anonymous, whistle blowing website. The website has been called the Tamil's WikiLeaks. The site publishes articles in Tamil and English. It is believed to be run by Savukku Shankar alias Achimuthu Shankar, a former lower division clerk in the Department of Personnel and Administrative Reforms in Directorate of Vigilance and Anti-Corruption (DVAC).

== Overview ==
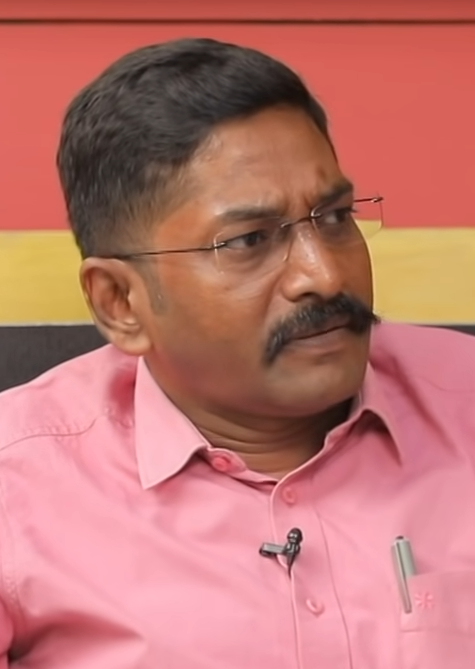
Achimuthu Shankar
Founder of the Savukku website

The website publishes articles anonymously, they say, about corrupt government employees, politicians, judges and journalists. It was started in September 2010. It does not give any information about the owner(s) or the publisher(s) of posts on website but is said to have been run by Achimuthu Shankar. In 2008, Shankar allegedly leaked the transcript of a taped conversation between S. K. Upadhyay, then director of DVAC, and L. K. Tripathi, then chief secretary of the state to the Deccan Chronicle English daily newspaper. He was found guilty and arrested and was allegedly subjected to third-degree torture to swear against some officers. After being released on bail, he started collecting information through Right to information act, and later made a blog post to make public the information he has gathered. It allegedly led to the second arrest of Shankar, but on charges of road rage. Thereafter he converted his blog into a website called, Savukku to expose corruption.

The first blog post was published anonymously on the website in September 2010 and it presently has around 960 posts since then including the 2G taped conversation.

In 2010–2011, when Aam Aadmi Party leader and senior advocate Prashant Bhushan released the tapes of alleged conversation between Dravida Munnetra Kazhagam Rajya Sabha member Kanimozhi and the then Tamil Nadu police chief of intelligence, Jaffar Sait, it was said to have made public by the website three days earlier.

On 1 February 2014, the website had publicly posted four tapes exposing the conversation between Kanimozhi and former additional director general of police Jaffer Sait and between Jaffer Sait and Sharad Kumar Reddy, a former director of Kalaignar TV owned by Karunanidhi. The authenticity of the taped conversation has not yet been challenged by either Kanimozhi or Dravida Munnetra Kazhagam party.

== Block ==
Mahalakshmi, an advocate and Sun TV newsreader had lodged a defamation case against the website for writing about her personal life, that she claimed have degraded her reputation. She later filed a writ petition in the Madras High Court citing inactivity of the police.

On 28 February 2014, the Madras High Court ordered the Joint Secretary, Cyber Law Division of Union Department of Information Technology to block the website within ten days and called other affected individuals to lodge separate police cases, on hearing the writ petition filed by Mahalakshmi. The court said that,

The reputation and status of not less than half a dozen judges, very many advocates, IAS and IPS officers stand attacked and damaged at the hands of this vituperative site. The contents of the posts in the website are so grossly demeaning, so obnoxious and so harmful that they are not worthy of being brought in print in an order of this court."

On 2 March 2014, following the court orders to block the website, many proxies were created to evade the block. The website continued to host mirrors of the site Savukku, this time naming the Judge of the Madras High Court who is hearing the case.

On 28 February 2014, the website was blocked on Madras High Court orders after a writ for defamation was filed by a Sun TV employee, Mahalakshmi. In a different matter, Shankar was charged under Sections 66, 70 and 72 of the Information Technology Act, alleged to have leaked the conversation between former Chief Secretary to Government and former Director of Vigilance and Anti-Corruption. He was acquitted on 24 February 2017.

=== Protests ===
Professor A., a human rights activist said that, one may not necessarily agree with the contents posted by the website but the blocking the website is unacceptable. The affected individuals are free to take legal action separately.

P. Sundarajan, a lawyer opined that, this is most unfortunate, and the particular Judge should refrain himself from hearing the case because he was also written about by the website and this order is nothing but a mockery of justice.

Citizens for Freedom of Expression, an organisation comprising senior advocates and activists said that they will prosecute in the case on behalf of the website and said that, the court order is a serious threat to freedom of expression.

A former BBC Tamil employee T.N. Gopalan filed a PIL in the Madras High Court, requesting the court to resist government from blocking the website except in the case described in the Information Technology Rules, 2009. Gopalan said that, he was not expecting the block on website which has discovered several scams and investigates and publishes information in public welfare.

J. Anbazhgan, president of Chennai Union of Journalists said that the union believes that the complaint filed by Mahalakhsmi is not accurate and is related to the ownership of 2G tapes by Shankar and a representative from the union has met the chief minister J. Jayalalithaa, to provide relief to Shankar.

== Achimuthu Shankar ==
Achimuthu Shankar, alias Savukku Shankar is a former lower division clerk in the Directorate of Vigilance and Anti-corruption, which he joined in 1991. under compassionate grounds on the passing away of his father. His son Theo with his ex-wife lawyer Aarthi died on 6 August 2026.

He had been a member of the CPM party.

In 2008, he allegedly made public sensational information which included taped conversation between S. K. Upadhyay, then Director of Directorate of Vigilance and Anti-corruption, and L. K. Tripathi, then Chief Secretary, through the Deccan Chronicle English daily newspaper.

In mid-2010, He published a blog post of information collected through the Right to information act and he was arrested on the charges of road rage next day. He said, "The next day I was arrested on some false charges of road rage. I was expecting them to [arrest me]. They did not disappoint".

He later upgraded his blog into a website after receiving encouragement by readers. In 2011, the Dravida Munnetra Kazhagam government lost the polls to form the government. Shankar opined that despite a new government coming to power, much information about social welfare still does not reach the public. He said,

Even within media there is a lot of corruption. Who is going to write about it? I will.

Shankar is an admirer of Velupillai Prabhakaran, chief of LTTE. The website had a picture of V. Prabhakaran on one side and a picture of a cowboy with a whip on the other side of the header. He continued to publish articles along with contesting the suspension of him from Department of Vigilance and Anti-corruption. He is called the Tamil's Julian Assange.

The website was the first to release the 2G tapes ahead of Prasant Bushan. An audio of conversation between, Kalaignar TV MD, Sharad Kumar and former TN Intelligence Chief Jaffer Sait IPS.

The website was the first to expose the arithmetical errors in the judgment of Justice CR Kumarasamy, acquitting Selvi Jayalalithaa, CM of Tamil Nadu in the month of May 2015

== Arrests ==
In 2008, Shankar was arrested for allegedly releasing a recording of a discussion between two IAS officials, L.K. Tripathy and S.K. Upadhyay, regarding a corruption investigation against J. Jayalalithaa, the leader of AIADMK, in connection with the acquisition of her Kodanad property. Initially when the sensitive information was leaked to public, the Tamil Nadu government appointed a commission headed by Judge P. Shanmugam to probe the leak. After an investigation by the judge from the High Court, Shankar was accused of leaking the recorded conversation. He was suspended by the DVAC and later arrested in July 2008, on charges under Sections 66, 70, and 72 of the IT Act. The prosecution accused Shankar, a special assistant in the confidential section of the DVAC, of accessing the computer system of the legal advisor's office without permission and downloading an audio file from the legal advisor's computer and caused its publication in the media. However, Shankar denied the allegations and said, charges were false and he was contesting them in courts. He also said that, he was made to face the third degree torture and was forced to bear witness against some officials. He was later released on bail. Savukku Shankar was acquitted by the XVII Additional Sessions Court Chennai on 24 February 2017 ruling that the prosecution could not provide sufficient evidence to support the charges against Shankar.

On 31 January 2014, A Puducherry-based web designer Murugaiyan was arrested by the Cyber Crime Police of Chennai for designing the website. After 21 days of imprisonment, Murugaiyan was released on bail by the Madras High Court. On 24 July 2014, Following the Madras High Court orders, Central Crime Branch arrested Pothi Kalimuthu on charge of hosting the website. He allegedly did own the website domain located in France and maintained a server located in Singapore for the website. The CCB officers had to make a request to the France Telecom through the Department of Telecommunications to reveal the address of the owner of the website domain. In a conversation, Achimuthu Shankar said to Indian Express English newspaper that, he met Kalimuthu online. Kalimuthu offered his help with making of new website after the original website was blocked on court orders and refused to take money for hosting the website.

On 15 September 2022, the Madras High court sentenced Savukku Shankar to six months in jail, finding him guilty of contempt of court, for his remarks made in Red Pix on July 22, where he claimed that the “entire higher judiciary is plagued by corruption”. Earlier, Shankar appeared in court and stood by his comments that the judiciary is corrupt, requesting time to respond. The chief justice assigned the case to the same bench. At a later hearing, Shankar requested more time to file his explanation but did not agree to refrain from mocking the court in interviews. The court later identified five more instances where Shankar had made comments against the judiciary. Shankar, who was representing himself, refused to apologize and stood by his statements. He argued that his comments were taken out of context and that he had respect for the judiciary and only aimed to improve it. He submitted an affidavit on the same day stating that his comments were concerned to the inadequate representation of oppressed groups and the disproportionate representation of Brahmins in the higher judiciary. However, the court dismissed this defense. During the sentencing process, the court declared that the remarks were merely a ridicule of the justice system. The court instructed the Ministry of Electronics and Information Technology (MeitY) to immediately remove the "offensive interviews" and the article. The court also ordered the Tamil Nadu government to dismiss him from the DVAC and he was subsequently dismissed following the order. While he was in jail, on 10 Nov 2022, just a day earlier to his Supreme Court hearing, 4 other pending cases were charged on him by the Chennai Central Crime Branch's Cyber Crime wing, 3 of those cases were registered in 2020, while 1 was registered in 2021. The initial contempt of court verdict was suspended by the Supreme Court, on 11 Nov 2022. On 19 Nov 2022, he was released from Cuddalore Central Prison on bail in all 4 cases.

In May 2024, Tamil YouTuber Savukku Shankar was arrested by the Coimbatore Cyber Crime Police for making derogatory comments about women police officers in an interview. During the arrest, the police vehicle transporting him to Coimbatore met with an accident, resulting in minor injuries to Shankar and two police personnel. Shankar was subsequently booked under various sections of the Indian Penal Code, the Tamil Nadu Prohibition of Harassment of Women Act, and the Information Technology Act.

Shankar's remarks, which were intended to highlight the abuse of power by superior officers, was twisted into a causus belli to suppress him as he was exposing popular politicians and corruption in police. Despite being a journalist and accused of a non-violent crime, he wasbeen detained under the Goondas Act, a stringent law usually reserved for habitual offenders, which allows for preventive detention.
