= The Case That Shook India =

Book by Prashant Bhushan on the Emergency, 1975–1977

The Case That Shook India: The Verdict That Led To The Emergency
- 2018 Penguin India edition
- Author: Prashant Bhushan
- Language: English
- Genre: Political history
- Published: 1978
- Publisher: Vikas Publishing House, Penguin
- Publication place: India
- ISBN: 9780706905946

The Case That Shook India: The Verdict That Led To The Emergency is a non-fictional book written by lawyer-activist Prashant Bhushan on the case that set aside Indira Gandhi's election in 1974 which lead to the Emergency followed by a democratic backsliding of the republic.
