= Republican Party of India (Gavai) =

Political party

The Republican Party of India (Gavai) is a political party in India. It is a splinter group of the Republican Party of India. The splinter party's leaders are former governor of Kerala R. S. Gavai and his son Rajendra Gavai.The current president of the Republican Party of India (Gawai) is S. Rajendran, former member of legislative assembly Karnataka. RPI (Gavai) is a constituent of the previous ruling United Progressive Alliance. Its presence is limited to Maharashtra.

In 2009 all factions of RPI except Prakash Ambedkar's Bharipa Bahujan Mahasangha reunited to form Republican Party of India (United). RPI (Gavai) was a part of that but later split again.
