= R. S. Gavai =

Indian politician

Ramkrishna Suryabhan Gavai
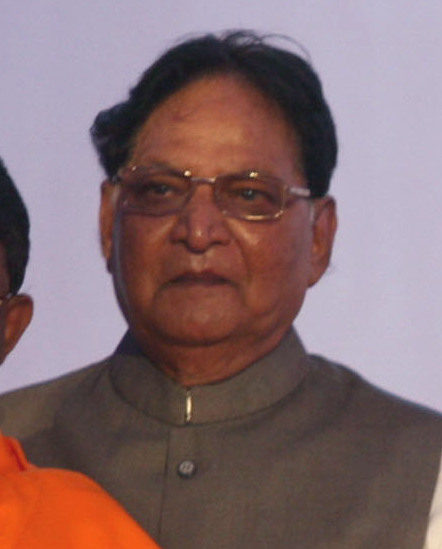

Governor of Kerala
- In office 11 July 2008 – 7 September 2011
- Chief Minister: V. S. Achuthanandan; Oommen Chandy
- Preceded by: R. L. Bhatia
- Succeeded by: M. O. H. Farook

Governor of Sikkim
- Additional Charge
- In office 13 July 2006 – 12 August 2006
- Chief Minister: Pawan Kumar Chamling
- Preceded by: V. Rama Rao
- Succeeded by: V. Rama Rao

Governor of Bihar
- In office 22 June 2006 – 9 July 2008
- Chief Minister: Nitish Kumar
- Preceded by: Gopalkrishna Gandhi (additional charge)
- Succeeded by: R. L. Bhatia

Member of Parliament, Rajya Sabha for Maharashtra
- In office 3 April 2000 – 2 April 2006

Member of Parliament, Lok Sabha
- In office 10 March 1998 – 26 April 1999
- Preceded by: Anant Gudhe
- Succeeded by: Anant Gudhe
- Constituency: Amravati

Leader of the Opposition of the Maharashtra Legislative Council
- In office 22 December 1986 – 20 December 1988
- In office 20 December 1990 – 17 July 1991

Chairman of the Maharashtra Legislative Council
- In office 1978 – 1982

Deputy Chairman of the Maharashtra Legislative Council
- In office 1968 – 1978

Member of the Maharashtra Legislative Council
- In office 1964 – 26 July 1994

Personal details
- Born: Ramkrishnan Suryabhan Gavai; 30 October 1929 Darapur, Amravati district, Central Provinces and Berar, British India
- Died: 25 July 2015 (aged 85) Nagpur, Maharashtra, India
- Party: Republican Party of India; Republican Party of India (Gavai)
- Spouse: Kamala Gavai
- Children: 2 son: Rajendra Gavai, Bhushan Gavai; a daughter: Kirti
- Parents: Suryabhan Gavai (father); Sarubai Gavai (mother)
- Education: Nagpur University
- Occupation: Politician, Ambedkarite social activist

Ramkrishna Suryabhan Gavai (30 October 1929 – 25 July 2015), popularly known as Dadasaheb Gavai, was an Indian politician, social activist, senior leader of the Ambedkarite movement, and founder of the Republican Party of India (Gavai). He was the President of Ambedkar's ideological party Republican Party of India, through this party, he did many works in political and social fields. Gavai also worked with Babasaheb Ambedkar, a polymath. He was the Governor of the three states of Bihar, Sikkim and Kerala, as well as he has served in both houses of the Indian Parliament, the Lok Sabha and the Rajya Sabha. Gavai was a 30-year member (MLC) of the Maharashtra Legislative Council during which he served on the posts of the chairman, the deputy chairman, and the Opposition leader of the council.

== Life and career ==
Gavai was born in 1929 at Daryapur, Amravati. He was an Ambedkarite and Buddhist. An agriculturist by profession and an avid wrestler, Gavai was from the state of Maharashtra. From 1964 to 1994, he was a member of the Maharashtra Legislative Council; during that time, he was Deputy Chairman of the Legislative Council from 1968 to 1978, chairman from 1978 to 1984, and twice Leader of the Opposition of the Legislative Council from 1986 to 1988 and from 1990 to 1991.

In 1998, Gavai was elected to the 12th Lok Sabha from Amravati. He was member of Rajya Sabha from Maharashtra State April 2000 until April 2006. In June 2006 he became the Governor of Bihar. He was the acting Governor of Sikkim from 13 July 2006 to 12 August 2006. On 26 June 2008, Gavai was instead appointed Governor of Kerala, switching posts with Kerala Governor R. L. Bhatia. He was sworn in as Governor of Kerala on 10 July 2008.

Gavai was a recipient of the Kusta Mitra Award, as well as the National Integration awards for peace and harmony. He was President of Dr. Babasaheb Ambedkar Smarak Samiti, Deeksha Bhoomi, Nagpur and Dr. Babasaheb Ambedkar Shikshan Prasarak Mandal, Amravati. He died on 25 July 2015 at Nagpur. He is survived by wife Kamaltai and two sons Bhushan Gavai, former Chief Justice of India, Rajendra Gavai, a prominent political leader and daughter Kirti.

== Overruling of AG's advice in Lavalin case ==
On 7 June 2009, Gavai gave the Central Bureau of Investigation permission to prosecute CPI(M) Kerala State Secretary and former Kerala Electricity Minister Pinarayi Vijayan in the SNC-Lavalin case. This became controversial as he ignored the advice of the Advocate General not to allow the CBI to prosecute Vijayan. The CPI(M) termed Gavai's decision as unfortunate and politically motivated, whereas the opposition parties of the state, including Indian National Congress, welcomed the governor's decision.
