= Manoj Misra =

Judge of the Supreme Court of India

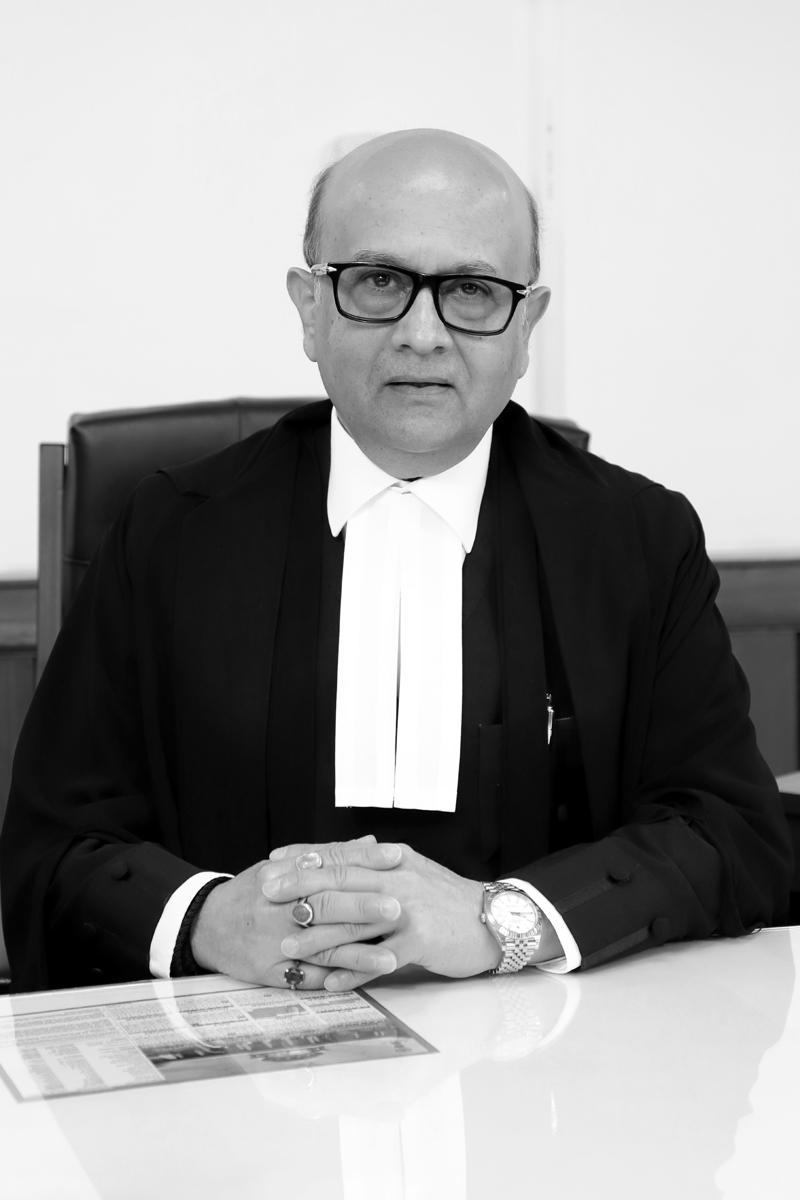

Judge of the Supreme Court of India
- Incumbent
- Assumed office 6 February 2023
- Nominated by: Dhananjaya Y. Chandrachud
- Appointed by: Droupadi Murmu

Judge of the Allahabad High Court
- In office 21 November 2011 – 5 February 2023
- Nominated by: S. H. Kapadia
- Appointed by: Pratibha Patil

Personal details
- Born: 2 June 1965 (age 61)
- Education: University of Allahabad

Manoj Misra (born 2 June 1965) is a judge of the Supreme Court of India. He is a former judge of the Allahabad High Court.

== Career ==
He graduated in law from University of Allahabad in 1988 and enrolled as an Advocate on 12 December 1988. He practised in Civil, Revenue, Criminal and Constitutional matters. He was elevated as an Additional Judge of Allahabad High Court on 21 November 2011 and was made permanent on 6 August 2013.
