= Rajendra Gavai =

Indian politician and physician

Rajendra Gavai is an Indian politician and president of Republican Party of India (Gavai).

== Early life and education ==
He is the son of a former Governor of Bihar and Kerala, R.S. Gavai, and a medical doctor.
