= Sanjiv Khanna =

51st Chief Justice of India (November 2024 to May 2025)

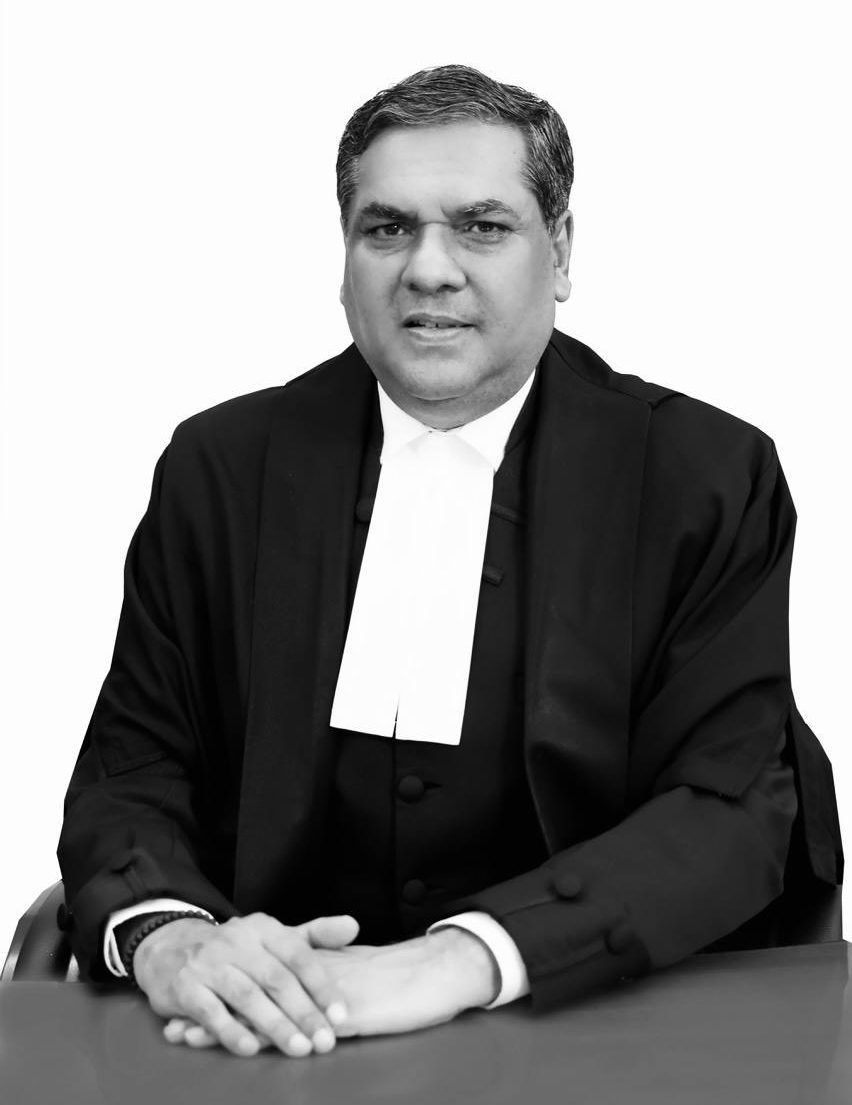
- Official portrait, 2024

51st Chief Justice of India
- In office 11 November 2024 – 13 May 2025
- Appointed by: Droupadi Murmu
- Preceded by: Dhananjaya Y. Chandrachud
- Succeeded by: Bhushan Ramkrishna Gavai

Judge of Supreme Court of India
- In office 18 January 2019 – 10 November 2024
- Nominated by: Ranjan Gogoi
- Appointed by: Ram Nath Kovind

Judge of Delhi High Court
- In office 24 June 2005 – 17 January 2019
- Nominated by: Ramesh Chandra Lahoti
- Appointed by: A P J Abdul Kalam

Personal details
- Born: 14 May 1960 (age 66) New Delhi, India
- Relations: Hans Raj Khanna (uncle)
- Children: 2
- Education: St Stephen's College, Delhi, (BA); Faculty of Law, Delhi, (LLB)

Sanjiv Khanna (born 14 May 1960) is a retired Indian jurist who served as the 51st Chief Justice of India from 11 November 2024 to 13 May 2025. He was the ex officio Patron-in-Chief of the National Legal Services Authority and the de facto Chancellor of the National Law School of India University. He has also served as a judge at the Delhi High Court.

== Early life and background ==
Sanjiv Khanna was born on 14 May 1960.

Khanna's uncle was Hans Raj Khanna, a former judge of the Supreme Court of India. Hans Raj, who propounded the basic structure doctrine in 1973 and famously delivered the lone dissenting judgement in the ADM Jabalpur v. Shiv Kant Shukla case, popularly known as the Habeas Corpus case, in 1976, was superseded to the office of the Chief Justice of India by M. H. Beg at the behest of the then Prime Minister Indira Gandhi, protesting which he resigned from the court in early 1977.

=== Education ===
Khanna completed his schooling at the Modern School, New Delhi, in 1977. After graduating from St. Stephen's College, Delhi in 1980 with a Bachelor of Arts, he studied Law at Campus Law Centre of the Faculty of Law, University of Delhi, in the same batch as Justice Indu Malhotra.

== Career ==
Khanna was enrolled as an Advocate in the Bar Council of Delhi in the year 1983. In 2004, he also served as the Standing Counsel (Civil) for the National Capital Territory of Delhi, and before this appointment, he was working as the Senior Standing Counsel for the Income Tax Department.

On 24 June 2005, he was elevated as an additional judge of the Delhi High Court and made permanent on 20 February 2006. He was elevated as a judge of the Supreme Court of India on 18 January 2019. Khanna was elevated despite 32 other High Court judges being more senior than him. His elevation sparked controversy within judicial circles; however, his appointment was approved by the Government of India.

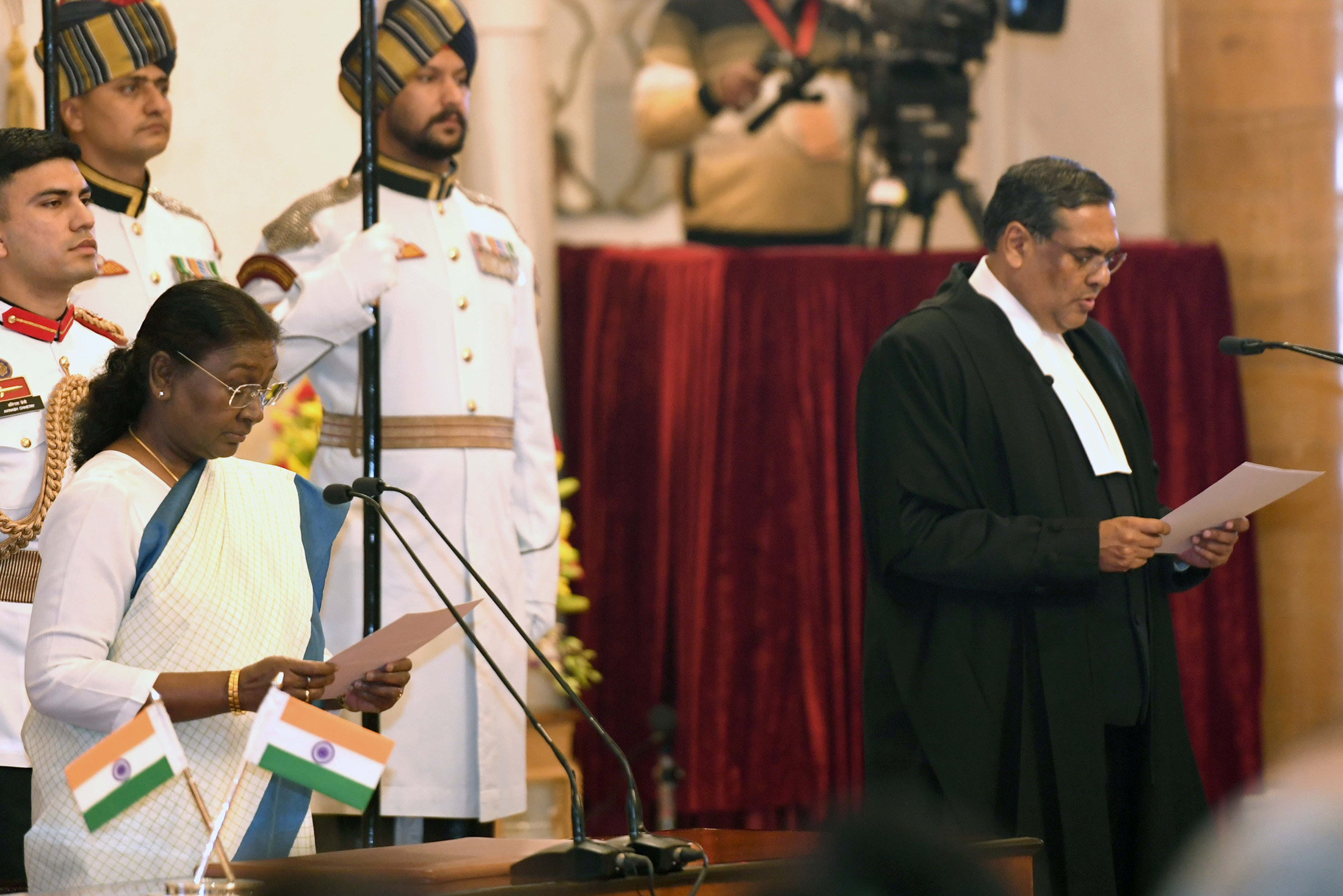
President Droupadi Murmu administering the oath of office to Justice Sanjiv Khanna as the Chief Justice of India.

On 17 October 2024, in accordance with central government convention, the outgoing Chief Justice Dhananjaya Y. Chandrachud recommended the name of Justice Khanna as the next Chief Justice to the Ministry of Law and Justice. Khanna took oath as the 51st Chief Justice of India (CJI) after the retirement of Chief Justice Dhananjaya Y. Chandrachud on 11 November 2024 during a ceremony held at Rashtrapati Bhavan. Khanna retired as the CJI on 13 May 2025, and was succeeded by Bhushan Ramkrishna Gavai as the next CJI. Khanna stated that he would not accept any official roles after his retirement; however, he would seek to remain in the field of law.

== Personal life ==
Khanna is married and has two children.
