= Administration of Dadra and Nagar Haveli and Daman and Diu =

Local government in India

- Seat of Government: Daman
- Country: India
- Website: https://ddd.gov.in/

Executive branch
- Administrator: Praful Khoda Patel
- Main organ: Government of India

Judiciary
- High Court: Bombay High Court
- Chief Justice: Alok Aradhe

The Administration of Dadra and Nagar Haveli and Daman and Diu is the governing body of the union territory of Dadra and Nagar Haveli and Daman and Diu. The administration is led by an administrator appointed by the President of India. The union territory does not have an elected legislative assembly. It governs three districts.

== History ==
The territories previously were part of the Portuguese Empire. Daman and Diu constituted each a district, which, together with the district of Goa, formed the former Portuguese State of India. Dadra and Nagar Haveli was administered as part of the district of Daman, constituting one of its municipalities.

From 1954 to 1961, the Varishta Panchayat of Free Dadra and Nagar Haveli administered Dadra and Nagar Haveli. Later a rebellion in the area against Portugal annexed the exclaves in 1961. The rebellion itself consisted of members of Rashtriya Swayamsevak Sangh, the Communist Party of India, the United Front of Goans, the Goan People's Party, Azad Gomantak Dal and the National Liberation Movement Organization. The territories of Dadra and Nagar Haveli subsequently joined India in late 1961 after a treaty signed by the Prime Minister of India (Jawaharlal Nehru) and de facto Prime Minister of Dadra and Nagar Haveli (K.G. Badlani).

On 19 December 1961 the territories of Goa, Daman and Diu were annexed by the Indian Army under Operation Vijay. The mission was concluded within 32 hours, after which the newly merged territory of Goa, Daman and Diu was put under military administration. It ended in June 1962 when the Legislative Assembly of Goa, Daman and Diu formed. Before its formation Kunhiraman Palat Candeth was head of the union territory.

== Executive branch ==
Dadra and Nagar Haveli and Daman and Diu is administered as a union territory of India by virtue of Article 240 (2) of the Constitution of India. The President of India appoints an administrator to administer the territory on behalf of the central Government of India. The central government may appoint advisers to assist the administrator with his duties.

The current administrator is Praful Khoda Patel. and his adviser is Gaurav Singh Rajawat, IAS.

== Members of Parliament ==
#	Seat	Member	Party
1.	Dadra and Nagar Haveli	Kalaben Delkar	BJP
2.	Daman and Diu	Umesh Patel	Independent
