= Varkund =

Coordinates: 20.4117°N 72.8581°E

Varkund is a village in the Daman district in the Indian Union Territory of Dadra and Nagar Haveli and Daman and Diu.
