= Dadra taluk =

Dadra
- Sub-district
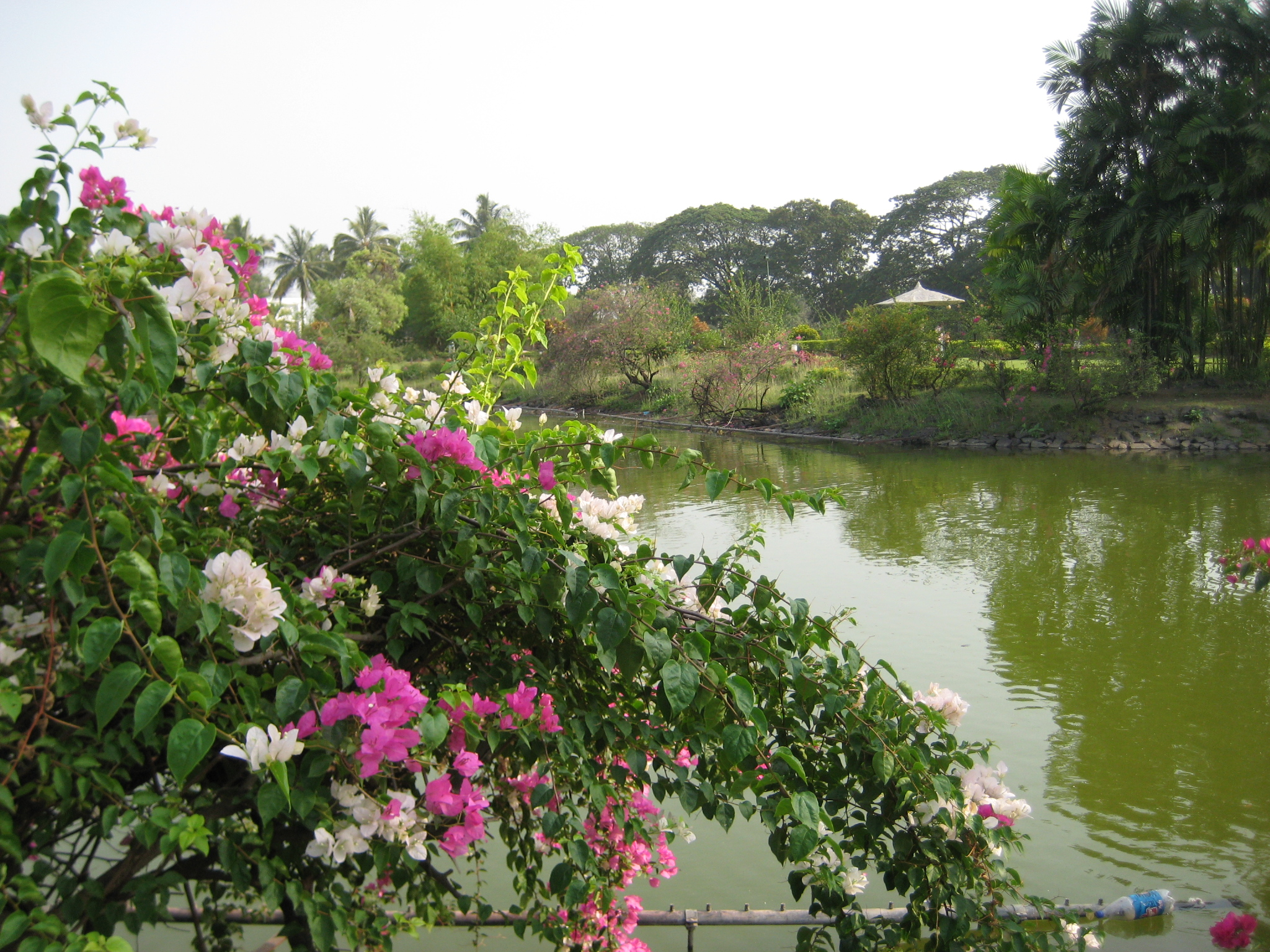
- Vanganga Lake, Dadra

- Dadra location Dadra (Gujarat) Dadra (Dadra and Nagar Haveli)
- Coordinates: 20.32°N 72.98°E
- Country: India
- Union Territory: DNDD
- District: Dadra and Nagar Haveli
- Named after: Dadra
- Demonym: Dadracar

Languages
  - Official: Hindi, English
  - Additional official: Gujarati
- Time zone: UTC+5:30 (IST)
- Nearest city: Silvassa
- Climate: Tropical monsoon climate Am (Köppen)
- Avg. summer temperature: 35 °C (95 °F)
- Avg. winter temperature: 18 °C (64 °F)

Dadra (/ˈdɑːdrə/) is one of the two talukas in Dadra and Nagar Haveli district, India. It is an enclave lying a few kilometres north west of Nagar Haveli and is surrounded by Gujarat.

Dadra is located 6 km west from district headquarter Silvassa. Dadra consists of Dadra town and two other villages — Demni and Tighra.

== History ==
Dadra was part of Portuguese India from 1779, right until 1954. The territory was handed over by the Marathas to the Portuguese for revenue collection in 1779 and was later entirely purchased by Portugal in 1785.

Under Portuguese rule, Dadra formed a freguesia (administrative parish) of the Nagar Haveli concelho (municipality). In turn, the Nagar Haveli concelho was part of the Daman district.

== Demography ==
Dadra is a Census Town city in district of Dadra and Nagar Haveli, Dadra and Nagar Haveli. The Dadra Census Town has population of 13,039 of which 8,193 are males while 4,846 are females as per report released by Census India 2011.

The population of children aged 0–6 is 1639 which is 12.57% of total population of Dadra (CT). In Dadra Census Town, the female sex ratio is 591 against state average of 774. Moreover, the child sex ratio in Dadra is around 935 compared to Dadra and Nagar Haveli state average of 926. The literacy rate of Dadra city is 90.51% higher than the state average of 76.24%. In Dadra, male literacy is around 94.53% while the female literacy rate is 83.23%.

Dadra Census Town has total administration over 3,385 houses to which it supplies basic amenities like water and sewerage. It is also authorized to build roads within Census Town limits and impose taxes on properties coming under its jurisdiction.
