= List of states and union territories of India by transport network =

== Ranked by Length of National Highways ==
This is a list of the States of India ranked by the length of the national highways, as of 23 May 2014. National Highways are the arterial roads of the country for inter-state movements of goods and passengers. They traverse the length and width of the country connecting the National and State capitals, major ports and rail junctions and link up with border roads and foreign highways

Rank	State	Length (km)	National Highway No.
1	Uttar Pradesh	7863	2, 2A, 3, 3A New, 7, 11, 12A, 19, 24, 24A, 24B, 25, 25A, 26, 27, 28, 28B, 28C, 29, 56, 56A, 56B, 58, 72A, 73, 74, 75, 76, 86, 87, 91, 91A, 92, 93, 96, 97, 119, 219 New, 231, 232, 232A, 233, 235, 330, 330A New, 334B New, 730 New, 730A New, 931 New, 931A New & NE-II
2	Rajasthan	7806.2	3, 3A New, 8, 11, 11A, 11B, 11C, 12, 14, 15, 25 Ext. New, 54 New, 65, 65A New, 71B, 76, 76A New, 76B New, 79, 79A New, 89, 90, 113, 112, 114, 116, 116A New, 158 New, 162A New, 162 Ext. New, 248A New, 325 New, 709 Ext. New & 927A New
3	Andhra Pradesh	7068.15	4, 5, 7, 9, 16, 18, 18A, 42 New, 43, 63, 67Ext. New, 150 New,167 New, 202, 205, 214, 214A, 219, 221, 222, 234, 326, 67 New,71 New, 161 New, 340 New, 363 New, 365 New, 565 New,765 New
4	Maharashtra	6335.44	3, 4, 4C, 6, 7, 8, 9, 13, 16, 17, 26B, 50, 69, 150 Ext. New, 161 New, 204, 211, 222, 348 New, 848 New, 160 New, 166 New, 166A New, 348 New, 361 New, 363 New, 753 New, 753A New, 753B New, 848A & 930 New
5	Karnataka	6294.29	4, 4A, 7, 9, 13, 17, 48, 50 New, 63, 67, 67New, 150, 150 Ext. New, 150A New, 167 New, 169A New, 173 New, 206, 207,209, 212, 218, 234, 275 New & 367 New
6	Madhya Pradesh	5184.57	3, 7, 12, 12A, 25, 26, 26A, 26B, 27, 43 New, 56 New, 59, 59A, 69, 69A, 75, 76, 78, 86, 92 & 927A New
7	Tamil Nadu	5006.14	4, 5, 7, 7A, 45, 45A, 45B, 45C, 46, 47, 47B, 49, 66, 67, 68, 205, 207, 208, 209, 210, 219, 220, 226, 226Ext., 227, 230, 234, 381 New, & 532 New
8	Bihar	4678.79	2, 2C, 19, 28, 28A, 28B, 30, 30A, 31, 57, 57A, 77, 80, 81, 82, 83, 84, 85, 98, 99, 101, 102, 103, 104, 105, 106, 107, 110, 122A New, 131A New, 133 New, 219 New, 327A New, 327 Ext. New, 333 New, 333A New, 527A New & 527C New
9	Odisha	4644.52	5, 5A, 6, 23, 42, 43, 60, 75, 130C New, 153B New, 157 New, 200, 201, 203, 203A, 215, 217, 220 New, 224, 326 New & 326 A New
10	Gujarat	3973.29	NE-I, 6, 8, 8A, 8B, 8C, 8D, 8E, 14, 15, 56, 58 New, 59, 113 228, 251 New, 753B New, 848 & 848A New, 848B New
11	Assam	3675.06	6 New, 31, 31B, 31C, 36, 37, 37A, 38, 39, 44, 51, 52, 52A, 52B, 53, 54, 61, 62, 117A New, 127B New, 127E New, 151,152, 153, 154, 315A New, 127C New & 127D New, 329 New, 427 New, 627 New, 702 New & 715A New
12	Chhattisgarh	3078.4	6, 12A, 16, 43, 78, 111, 130A New, 130B New, 130C New, 130D New, 149B New, 163A New, 200, 202, 216, 217, 221, 343 New, 930New
13	Jharkhand	2996.64	2, 6, 23, 31, 32, 33, 43 New, 75, 78, 80, 98, 99, 100, 114A New, 133 New, 133A New, 143 New, 143A New, 220 New, 333 New, 333A New, 343 New & 419 New
14	West Bengal	2909.8	2, 2B, 6, 10, 31, 31A, 31C, 31D, 32, 34, 35, 41, 55, 60, 60A, 80, 81, 114A New, 116B New, 117, 131A, 133A New, 317A, 327B, 512 New & 717
15	Himachal Pradesh	2396.48	1A, 3 New, 20, 20A, 21, 21A, 22, 70, 72, 72B, 88, 73A, 154A New, 305 New, 503 New, 503 Ext. New & 505 New
16	Uttarakhand	2364.92	58, 72, 72A, 72B,73, 74, 87, 87 Ext., 94, 107 New, 108, 109, 123, 119, 121, 125& 309A New
17	Jammu & Kashmir	2319	1A, 1B, 1C, 1D, 3 New, 144 New, 144A New, 301 New, 444 New, 501 New & 701 New
18	Punjab	2136.15	1, 1A, 10, 15, 20, 21, 22, 64, 70, 71, 72, 95, 103 A New, 503 Ext. New, 703 New 703A New & 754 New
19	Haryana	2057.48	1, 2, 8, 10, 11 New, 21A, 22, 54 New, 64, 65, 71, 71A, 72, 73, 73A, 71B, 236, 248 A New, 334B New, 703 New, 709 Ext New. & NE-II
20	Kerala	1811.52	17, 47, 47A, 47C, 49, 183A New, 185 New, 208, 212, 213, & 220
21	Arunachal Pradesh	1780.05	52, 52A, 153, 229, 52B Ext, 37 Ext. & 315A
22	Manipur	1488.74	39, 53, 102A New, 102B New, 129A new, 108A New, 129 New, 137 New, 150, 155, 702A New
23	Meghalaya	1204.36	40, 44, 51, 62 & 127B New
24	Mizoram	1181	6 New, 44A, 54, 54A, 54B, 150, 154, 302 New & 502A New
25	Nagaland	1046.09	36, 39, 61, 129 New, 129A, 150, 155, 702 New & 702A New
26	Tripura	577	44, 44A & 208 New
27	Sikkim	309	31A, 310, 310A New, 510 New, 710 New
28	Goa	262	4A, 17, 17A & 17B
U/T	Andaman and Nicobar Islands	330.7	223 no way
U/T	Delhi	80	1, 2, 8, 10, 24 & 236
U/T	Puducherry	64.03	45A & 66
U/T	Dadra Nagar Haveli	31	848A New
U/T	Daman & Diu	22	848B New & 251 New
U/T	Chandigarh	15.28	21

== Ranked by Length of State Highways ==
This is a list of the States of India ranked by the length of the state highways, as of 31 March 2012. State Highways are the arterial roads in a State for inter-district movements. They traverse the length and width of a state connecting the state capital, district headquarters and important towns and cities and link up with the National Highways and adjacent State Highways.

Rank	State	Length (km)
1	Maharashtra	50,151
2	Karnataka	20,774
3	Gujarat	18,480
4	Tamil Nadu	10,764
5	Andhra Pradesh	10,650
6	Madhya Pradesh	10,501
7	Rajasthan	10,456
8	Uttar Pradesh	7,876
9	Chhattisgarh	5,240
10	Bihar	4,857
11	West Bengal	4,505
12	Kerala	4,341
13	Uttarakhand	3,788
14	Odisha	3,654
15	Assam	3,134
16	Haryana	2,521
17	Jharkhand	1,886
18	Himachal Pradesh	1,626
19	Punjab	1,477
20	Manipur	1,137
21	Nagaland	1,001
22	Meghalaya	856
23	Mizoram	700
24	Tripura	689
25	Goa	279
26	Sikkim	179
27	Jammu and Kashmir	67
U/T	Andaman and Nicobar Islands	246
U/T	Dadra & Nagar Haveli	42
U/T	Puducherry	38

Sl: No	State	Road density (m/km^{2})
1	Uttar Pradesh	28.11
2	Rajasthan	16.32
3	Tamil Nadu	37.15
4	Madhya Pradesh	15.15
5	Andhra Pradesh	16.50
6	Karnataka	22.92
7	Maharashtra	13.57
8	Odisha	23.79
9	Bihar	38.67
10	Gujarat	16.55
11	Assam	36.16
12	West Bengal	29.05
13	Chhattisgarh	---
14	Uttarakhand	38.18
15	Arunachal Pradesh	23.79
16	Jharkhand	22.64
17	Punjab	30.92
18	Haryana	34.19
19	Kerala	37.49
20	Himachal Pradesh	25.31
21	Jammu and Kashmir	5.60
22	Manipur	42.95
23	Mizoram	43.97
24	Meghalaya	36.11
25	Nagaland	29.79
26	Tripura	38.15
27	Goa	72.66
28	Sikkim	8.74
