= List of states and union territories of India by number of places of worship =

This is a list of states and territories of India by number of places of worship as reported by the Census 2001. Uttar Pradesh has highest number of places of worship.

== List ==
Rank	State / Territory	Number of Places of Worship	References
(India) India		2,366,625	
1	Uttar Pradesh	265,270	
2	West Bengal	228,452	
3	Maharashtra	220,458	
4	Karnataka	207,336	
5	Rajasthan	166,766	
6	Andhra Pradesh	159,025	
7	Madhya Pradesh	142,452	
8	Gujarat	142,135	
9	Bihar	138,493	
10	Tamil Nadu	130,346	
11	Odisha	103,350	
12	Kerala	101,140	
13	Assam	90,194	
14	Jharkhand	50,110	
15	Punjab	46,493	
16	Chhattisgarh	46,095	
17	Himachal Pradesh	26,526	
18	Uttarakhand	25,959	
19	Haryana	24,519	
20	Tripura	12,872	
21	Delhi	8,249	
22	Meghalaya	5,771	
23	Goa	5,686	
24	Manipur	5,251	
25	Mizoram	3,154	
26	Arunachal Pradesh	2,363	
27	Nagaland	2,360	
28	Puducherry	2,146	
29	Andaman and Nicobar Islands	1,121	
30	Sikkim	1,049	
31	Daman and Diu	477	
32	Lakshadweep	430	
33	Chandigarh	340	
34	Jammu and Kashmir		
35	Dadra and Nagar Haveli	241	
36	Ladakh		
