= List of states and union territories of India by television ownership =

This is a list of the states of India ranked in order of percentage of households owning a television set.

On March 13, 2012, the Ministry of Home Affairs released comprehensive data under "Houselisting and Housing Census" which was collected as part of the Decennial Census exercise conducted in 2011. The Census of India 2001 results have also been provided for comparison.

Delhi had the highest percentage of TV ownership amongst union territories with 88 percent and Tamil Nadu has the highest TV ownership amongst states with 87 percent. Dadra and Nagar Haveli have the lowest percentage of TV ownership amongst union territories with 47 percent and Bihar has the lowest TV ownership amongst states with 14.5 percent.

Between 2001 and 2011, percentage of Indian households owning a television set increased from 31.6% to 47.2%.

== List ==
Number	State	Television ownership (%) (Census 2011)	Census (2001)
1	Delhi	88.0	74.5
2	Tamil Nadu	87.0	39.5
3	Punjab	81.7	67.7
4	Chandigarh	82.5	73.9
5	Kerala	76.8	38.8
6	Himachal Pradesh	74.4	53.3
7	Andaman and Nicobar Islands	68.5	52.4
8	Haryana	67.9	53.0
9	Lakshadweep	64.1	33.4
10	Uttarakhand	62.0	42.9
11	Daman and Diu	61.0	49.3
12	Karnataka	60.0	37.0
13	Andhra Pradesh (includes Telangana)	58.8	31.5
14	Maharashtra	56.6	44.1
15	Mizoram	55.1	48.3
16	Sikkim	54.7	30.9
17	Gujarat	53.8	38.7
18	Jammu and Kashmir	51.0	40.7
19	Manipur	47.4	24.2
Overall	India	47.2	31.6
20	Dadra and Nagar Haveli	47.2	27.8
21	Tripura	44.9	23.7
22	Arunachal Pradesh	41.1	25.7
23	Nagaland	37.9	18.1
24	Rajasthan	37.6	28.1
25	West Bengal	35.3	26.6
26	Meghalaya	33.7	20.9
27	Uttar Pradesh	33.2	25.0
28	Madhya Pradesh	32.1	29.6
29	Chhattisgarh	31.3	21.5
30	Assam	27.5	18.3
31	Jharkhand	26.8	17.2
32	Odisha	26.7	15.5
33	Bihar	14.5	9.1
