= Dadra and Nagar Haveli Wildlife Sanctuary =

Protected area in western India

- Satmalia Deer Park; Vasona Lion Safari
- IUCN category IV (habitat/species management area)
- Location within India
- Interactive map of Dadra and Nagar Haveli Wildlife Sanctuary
- Location: Dadra and Nagar Haveli, DNHDD, India
- Nearest city: Silvassa
- Coordinates: 20.177°N 73.037°E
- Area: 97 km^{2} (37 sq mi)
- Governing body: Dadra and Nagar Haveli Tourism
- Website: dnh.gov.in/tourism

Dadra and Nagar Haveli Wildlife Sanctuary is a wildlife sanctuary located in the Indian Union Territory of Dadra and Nagar Haveli and Daman and Diu. The sanctuary includes the Satmalia Deer Park and Vasona Lion Safari

== Satmalia Deer Park ==
The Satmalia Deer park is located near Khanvel village on Silvassa-Khanvel road, 12 km south of nearest city and district headquarter Silvassa.

This wildlife sanctuary is a home for many antelope species such as Chital, Nilgai, Sambar, Chinkara and Blackbuck. Other species like Indian peafowl, Flameback Woodpecker, Thrushes etc. can also be found.

== Vasona Lion Safari ==
Vasona Wildlife Sanctuary is also a part of this sanctuary located near the Satmalia Deer Park.

The Lion Safari Park is just 10 km south of Silvassa, the nearest city.

The park was built for the preservation of the Asiatic Lion. The park is also a host to Python species.
