= Naroli =

Village in Dadra and Nagar Haveli, India

Naroli is a village in Dadra and Nagar Haveli, Dadra and Nagar Haveli, India.
