= Emblem of Dadra and Nagar Haveli and Daman and Diu =

Official Seal of Dadra and Nagar Haveli and Daman and Diu

- Armiger: Government of Dadra and Nagar Haveli and Daman and Diu
- Adopted: 2020

The Seal of Dadra and Nagar Haveli and Daman and Diu is the official emblem used by the Union Territory of Dadra and Nagar Haveli and Daman and Diu, India. The emblem represents the unity of the merged territories and reflects their cultural heritage.

== Description ==
The emblem typically features symbolic elements representing the coastal geography, cultural richness, and administrative identity of the Union Territory.

== Usage ==
The seal is used by the Union Territory administration for official purposes including documentation, government signage, and official communications.

== See also ==
- Dadra and Nagar Haveli and Daman and Diu
- National Emblem of India
- List of Indian state emblems
