= Amli =

Amli is the Gujarati term for tamarind.

Amli may also refer to:

- Amli, India, a town in the Union Territory of Dadra & Nagar Haveli
- Åmli Municipality, a municipality in Agder county, Norway
- Åmli (village), a village within Åmli Municipality in Agder county, Norway
- Amli, a play by Hrishikesh Sulabh in Bideshiya Shaili
- AMLI Residential, a real estate company in the US
