= Daman taluka =

Coordinates: 20.42°N 72.85°E

Daman Tehsil is the only tehsil (Taluk) of union territory Daman district located in western India. Daman is the headquarters of the tehsil and district.

== Villages in Daman Tehsil ==
- Daman
- Bhamati
- Bhimpore
- Dabhel
- Damanwada
- Deva Paradi
- Devaka
- Dholar
- Dunetha
- Jampor
- Nanivankad
- Kachigam
- Kadaiya
- Magarwada
- Marwad
- Nayala Paradi
- Palhit
- Pariyari
- Ringanwada
- Thana Paradi
- Varkund
- Zari
