= Dadra and Nagar Haveli district =

District in Western India

- District
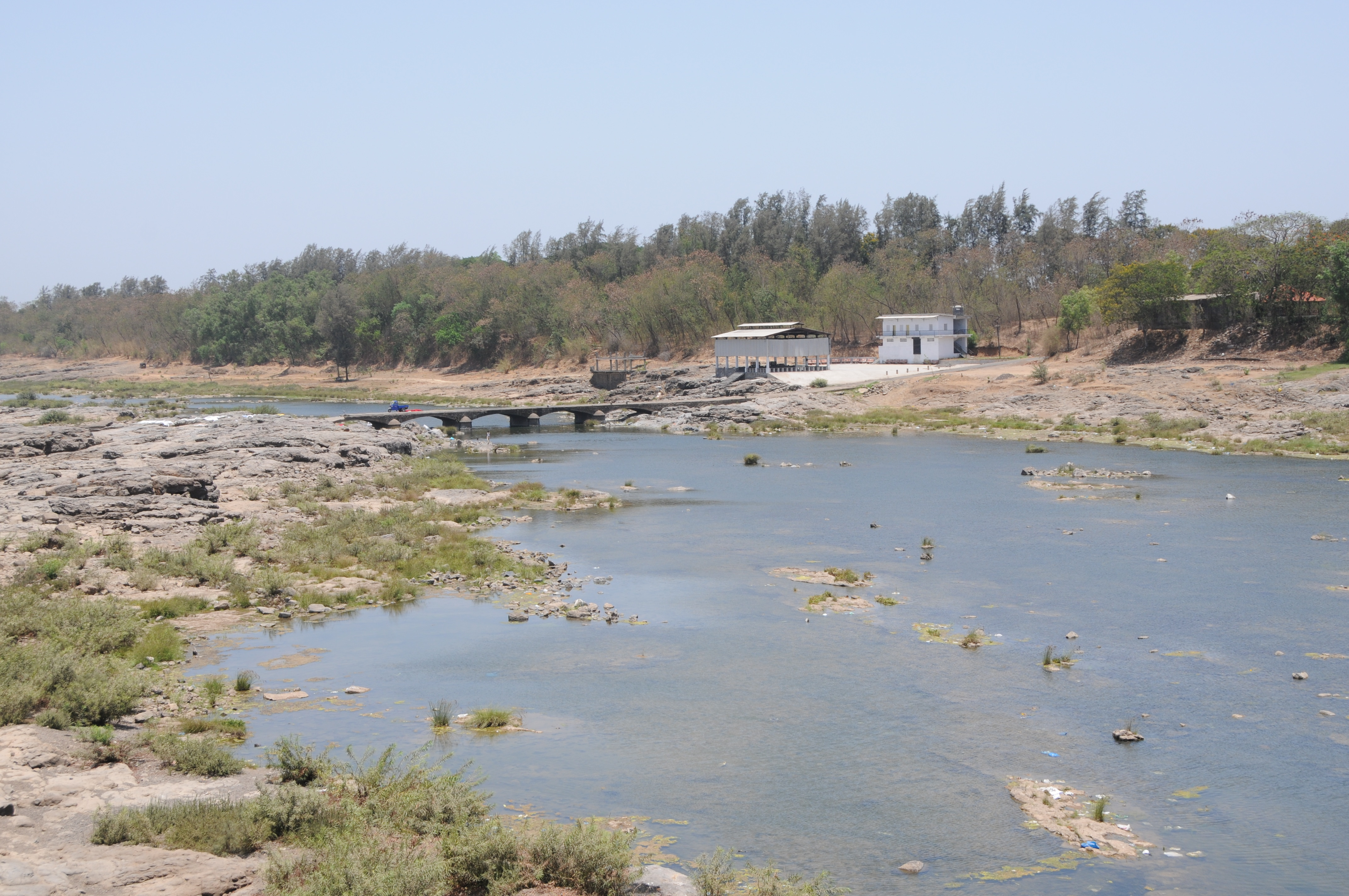
- Daman Ganga River in Silvassa

- Coordinates: 20.27°N 73.02°E
- Country: India
- Union territory: Dadra and Nagar Haveli and Daman and Diu
- Headquarters: Silvassa

Government
  - Member of Parliament: Kalaben Delkar (BJP)

Area
  - Total: 491 km^{2} (190 sq mi)
  - Rank: 32nd
- Elevation: 16 m (52 ft)

Population (2011)
  - Total: 343,709
  - Rank: 33rd
  - Density: 700/km^{2} (1,810/sq mi)

Languages
  - Official: Hindi, Gujarati

Most spoken languages (2001)
  - Most spoken: Bhilodi, Gujarati, Hindi
- Time zone: UTC+5:30 (IST)
- Vehicle registration: DD-01
- HDI: ▲0.624 (2022)
- HDI Category: medium
- Website: dnh.gov.in

Dadra and Nagar Haveli district (Note: Hindi pronunciation: [ˈd̪ɑːd̪ɾɑː ɔːɾ ˈnəɡəɾ ɦəˈʋeːliː]; Gujarati pronunciation: [ˈd̪ɑd̪ɾɑ ˈəne ˈnəɡəɾ ɦəˈʋeli]) is a district of the union territory of Dadra and Nagar Haveli and Daman and Diu in western India. It is composed of two separate geographical entities: Nagar Haveli, wedged in between Maharashtra and Gujarat states; and, 1 kilometre (0.62 mi) to the north-west, the smaller enclave of Dadra, which is surrounded by Gujarat. Silvassa is the administrative headquarters of Dadra and Nagar Haveli.

Unlike the surrounding areas, Dadra and Nagar Haveli was ruled by the Portuguese from 1783 until the mid-20th century. The area was captured by pro-India forces in 1954 and administered as the de facto state of Free Dadra and Nagar Haveli before acceding to India as a union territory, the union territory of Dadra and Nagar Haveli in 1961. The union territory was merged with the neighbouring union territory of Daman and Diu to form the new union territory of "Dadra and Nagar Haveli and Daman and Diu" on 26 January 2020. The territory of Dadra and Nagar Haveli then became one of the three districts of the new union territory, as the Dadra and Nagar Haveli district.

== History ==
=== Pre-Portuguese era ===
The history of Dadra and Nagar Haveli begins with the defeat of the Koli chieftains of the region by the Rajput kings. In the year 1262, a Rajput prince from Rajasthan named Ram Singh established himself as the ruler of Ramnagar, the present-day Dharampur, which consisted of 8 parganas (a group of villages) and assumed the title Maharana. Nagar Haveli was one of the Parganas, and its capital was Silvassa.

In 1360, Rana Dharamshah shifted his capital from Nagar Haveli to Nagar Fatehpur.

With the rise of Maratha power, Shivaji Maharaj viewed Ramnagar as an important locality. He captured the region, but Somshah Rana recaptured it in 1690.

After the Treaty of Vasai (6 May 1739), Vasai and the surrounding territories came under the Maratha rule.

Soon after, the Marathas captured Ramnagar but reinstated the ruler, Ramdeo, under conditions. Thus the Marathas acquired the rights to collect revenue, known as chauthai. from Nagar Haveli and two other Parganas.

During the time of Dharamdeo, the son of Ramdeo, due to his change of policies (he neglected the conditions imposed earlier by the Marathas), the Marathas captured Nagar Haveli and the surrounding region.

=== Portuguese era ===
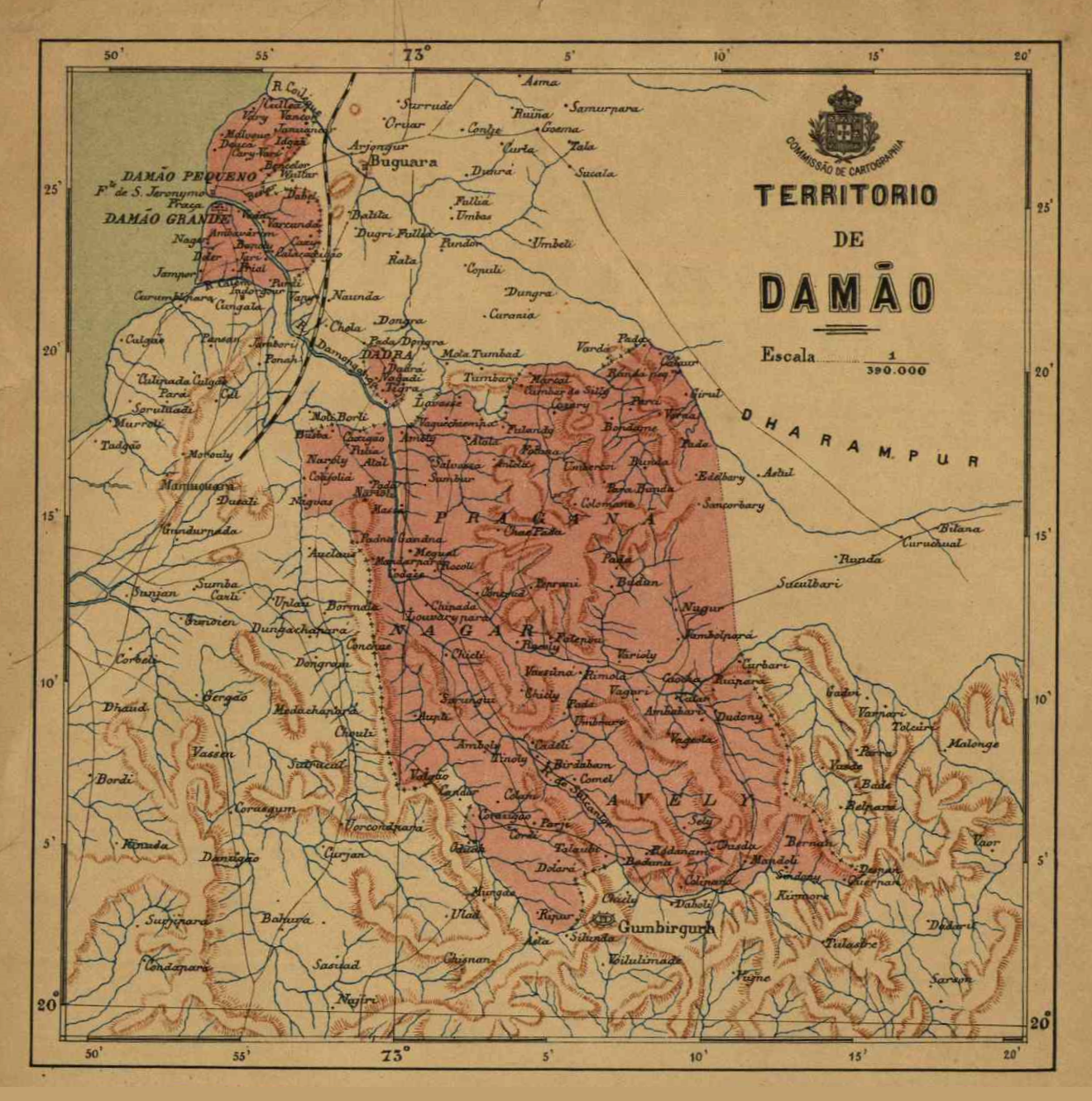
Daman, Dadra and Nagar Haveli during the Portuguese period

The Portuguese were granted the area of Nagar Haveli on 10 June 1783 on the basis of a friendship treaty executed on 17 December 1779 as compensation for damage to the Portuguese frigate Santana by the Maratha Navy in 1772. The treaty allowed the Portuguese to collect revenue from 72 villages in Nagar Haveli. Then, in 1785 the Portuguese purchased Dadra, annexing it to Portuguese State of India (Estado Português da Índia).

In 1818, the Maratha Empire was defeated by the British in the Third Anglo-Maratha War, and the Portuguese ultimately became the effective rulers of Dadra and Nagar Haveli.

Under the Portuguese rule, Dadra and Nagar Haveli were part of the Distrito de Damão (Daman district) of the Estado da Índia (Portuguese State of India). The two territories formed a single concelho (municipality), named "Nagar Haveli", with its head in Darará until 1885 and, after that, with its head in the town of Silvassa. The local affairs were overseen by an elected câmara municipal (municipal council), with the higher level affairs administrated by the district governor of Daman, who was represented in Nagar Haveli by an administrator.

The Nagar Haveli concelho was itself divided in the following freguesias (civil parishes): Silvassa, Noroli, Dadra, Quelalunim, Randá, Darará, Cadoli, Canoel, Carchonde, and Sindonim.

Portuguese rule lasted until 1954, when Dadra and Nagar Haveli were captured by supporters of the Indian Union. It was the first possession to be detached from the colonial Empire by the integration with the Indian Union in 1954, after nearly two centuries of Colonial rule.

=== End of Portuguese rule ===
After India attained independence in 1947, the residents of Dadra and Nagar Haveli, with the help of volunteers of organisations like the United Front of Goans (UFG), the National Movement Liberation Organisation (NMLO), and the Azad Gomantak Dal, conquered the territories of Dadra and Nagar Haveli from Portuguese India in 1954.

As time passed, the Indian independence struggle picked up momentum. On 18 June 1946, Ram Manohar Lohia was arrested in Goa. This was the beginning of the independence struggle in Goa. He was deported to India. On 15 August 1947, India became independent from British rule, but the Portuguese and other European colonies were not immediately incorporated.

The Goan struggle continued for many years. Atmaram Narsinh Karmalkar, an officer in the Banco Colonial (Portuguese Bank) at Panaji (in Goa) (then known as Panjim), who was popularly known as Appasaheb Karmalkar, was indirectly involved in the freedom struggle in Goa. He was dismissed from the bank and finally took up the struggle to liberate Goa. In the course of time, he realised that the liberation of DNH was crucial if Goa was to be liberated. Karmalkar reached Vapi and met Jayantibhai Desai from Dadra. He also met Bhikubhai Pandya from Nani Daman and Vanmali Bhavsar from Silvassa.

Azad Gomantak Dal under the leadership of Vishwanath Lavande, Dattatreya Deshpande, Prabhakar Sinari and others, the Communist Party under the leadership of Shamrao Parulekar and Godavaribai Parulekar, and the United Front of Goans under the leadership of Francis Mascerenhas, J.M. D'Souza, Waman Desai and others were also attempting the liberation of DNH.

On 18 June 1954, many leaders met at Lavachha. Lavachha and Vapi were Indian territories. The order in which these places lie (from east to west) is Nagar Haveli, Lavachha, Dadra, Vapi and Daman (on the sea coast). So Portuguese officers required transit permits through the Indian territories of Lavachha and Vapi to travel between N.H., Dadra, and Daman.

On the night of 22 July 1954, 15 volunteers of the United Front of Goans under the leadership of Francis Mascerenhas and Waman Desai sneaked into the territory of Dadra and reached the police station. There were only three personnel at the police station. One was attacked with a knife by one of the volunteers, and the other two were overpowered. The Indian tricolour was hoisted and the Indian National Anthem was sung. Dadra was declared the "Free territory of Dadra".

On the night of 28 July, around 30 to 35 volunteers of Azad Gomantak Dal proceeded to Naroli from Karambele (Karambeli) by swimming across the rivulets. June to September is the rainy season in the region, and the rivers are usually flooded during this season. The Daman Ganga river was flooded and no help could reach Naroli. This was the reason to choose this date for proceeding to Naroli. There were only six police personnel. The volunteers and the villagers reached the police station and asked them to surrender or face death. They immediately surrendered. The Portuguese rule of Naroli came to an end.

The Special Reserve Police in the Indian Territory did not intervene. J.D. Nagarwala, the Dy. Inspector General of the Special Reserve Police in the Indian Territory, without entering DNH, asked Captain Fidalgo, the Administrator of Dadra and Nagar Haveli, to surrender to the Indian Forces along with his paramilitary forces before they would be executed by the liberators.

Leaving about 50 policemen and five civilian officers posted at Silvassa, Captain Fidalgo fled to Udva passing through Rakholi, Dappada, and Khanvel and surrendered to the SRP on 11 August. They were later allowed to go to Goa.

In the meanwhile, there were several rumours and the officers at Silvassa were in confusion. On 1 August, the liberators took advantage of the situation and proceeded from Dadra and Naroli and liberated Pipariya. The five police officers surrendered without resistance.

During the night, the volunteers divided themselves into three batches and reached the police chowky at Silvassa. The police chowky at Silvassa was protected by sandbags. There were three policemen on guard on three sides. Vasant Badve, Vishnu Bhople, and Shantaram Vaidya overpowered them from behind when least expected. The other policemen surrendered without resistance on seeing the other volunteers. The volunteers spent the night awake at the police chowky.

On the morning of 2 August 1954, the liberators reached the town of Silvassa to find it free of any Portuguese occupation. The liberation of Dadra and Nagar Haveli was complete.

Senhor Luis de Gama, the eldest nationalist, hoisted the Indian National Flag and declared the territory of Dadra and Nagar Haveli liberated and the Indian National Anthem was sung.

=== Free Dadra and Nagar Haveli ===
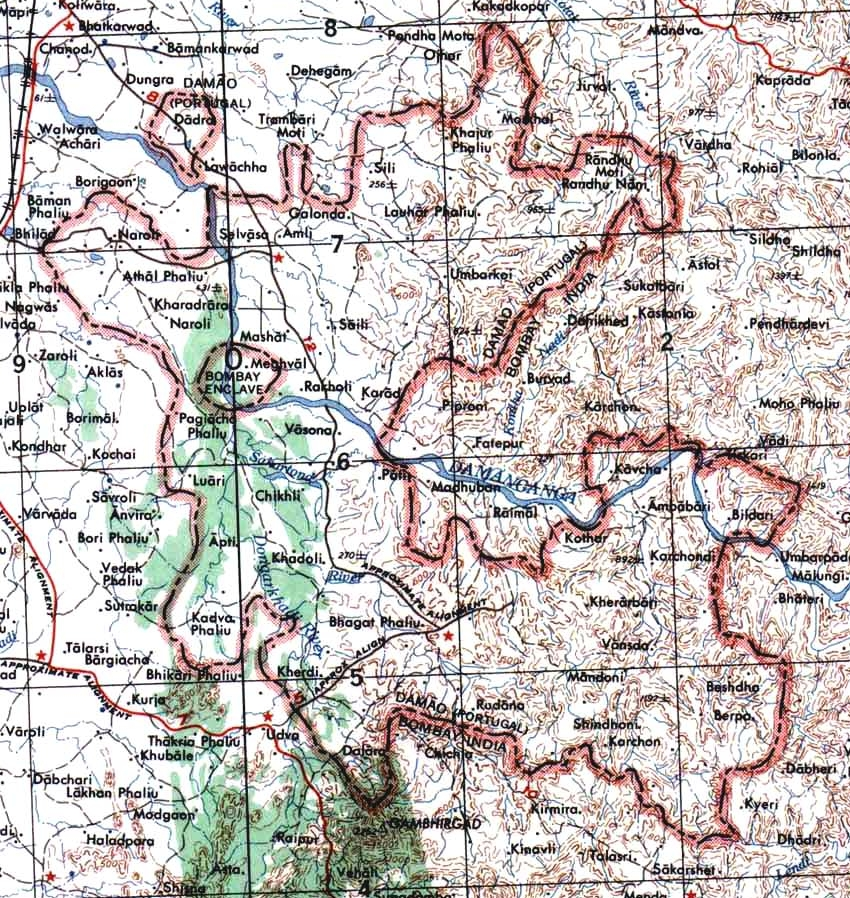
Old map of the territory.

From 1954 to 1961, Dadra and Nagar Haveli existed as a de facto state known as Free Dadra and Nagar Haveli. It was administered by a body called the Varishta Panchayat of Free Dadra and Nagar Haveli, with administrative help from the government of India. Although it enjoyed de facto independence, Dadra and Nagar Haveli were still recognised internationally (e.g. by the International Court of Justice) as Portuguese colony.

=== Integration into India ===
In 1961, amidst Indian preparation for the invasion of Goa, Daman, and Diu, K.G. Badlani, an officer of the Indian Administrative Service was, for one day, designated the Prime Minister of Dadra and Nagar Haveli, so that, as Head of State, he could sign an agreement with the Prime Minister of India, Jawaharlal Nehru, and formally merge Dadra and Nagar Haveli with the Republic of India. The Tenth Amendment of the Constitution of India was passed to incorporate Dadra and Nagar Haveli as a union territory, effective 11 August 1961.

On 31 December 1974 a treaty was signed between India and Portugal on recognition of India's sovereignty over Goa, Daman, Diu, Dadra and Nagar Haveli.

In December 2019, the Parliament of India passed legislation to merge Dadra and Nagar Haveli with the nearby union territory of Daman and Diu to create a single union territory to be known as Dadra and Nagar Haveli and Daman and Diu on 26 January 2020. Dadra and Nagar Haveli will be one of the three districts of the new union territory.

== Geography ==
Location of Dadra and Nagar Haveli

The area of Dadra and Nagar Haveli is spread over 491 square kilometres (190 sq mi). Its population density is 698 square kilometres (269 sq mi). Though landlocked between Gujarat to the north and Maharashtra to the south, it is close to the western coast of India (between 20°0′ and 20°25′ N latitude and between 72°50′ and 73°15′ E longitude), and the Arabian Sea can be reached via Vapi in Gujarat.

Dadra and Nagar Haveli comprises two separate geographical units. The larger part—Nagar Haveli—spans a roughly C-shaped area upriver from the city of Daman on the coast, at the centre of which, straddling the border with Gujarat, is the Madhuban reservoir. The smaller enclave of Dadra is a short distance to the northwest.

Dadra and Nagar Haveli is in the middle of the undulating watershed of the Daman Ganga River, which flows through Nagar Haveli and later forms the short southern border of Dadra. The towns of Dadra and Silvassa lie on the north bank of the river. The Western Ghats range rises to the east, and the foothills of the range occupy the eastern portion of the district.

Dadra and Nagar Haveli is surrounded by Valsad District of Gujarat on the west, north, and east, and by Thane District of Maharashtra on the south and southeast (after the division of Thane District, it is now surrounded by the newly formed Palghar District).

Maghval is a small enclave village belonging to Gujarat that is located within Nagar Haveli, just south of Silvassa.

The nearest railway stations are Bhilad and Vapi in Gujarat on the Mumbai-Delhi route (Western Railways). Bhilad is about 14 km west of Silvassa & Vapi is about 18 km northwest of Silvassa. Mumbai is approximately 180 km from Silvassa. Surat city is about 140 km away. Mumbai and Surat are the nearest airports.

=== Topography ===
The stretch of the main southern area is hilly terrain especially towards the northeast and east where it is surrounded by ranges of the Sahyadri mountains (Western Ghats). The central alluvial region of the land is almost plain and the soil is fertile and rich. The river Damanganga rises in the Ghat 64 km from the western coast and discharges itself in the Arabian Sea at the port of Daman after crossing Dadra and Nagar Haveli. Its three tributaries, Varna, Pipri and Sakartond, join Daman Ganga within the territory.

=== Flora and fauna ===
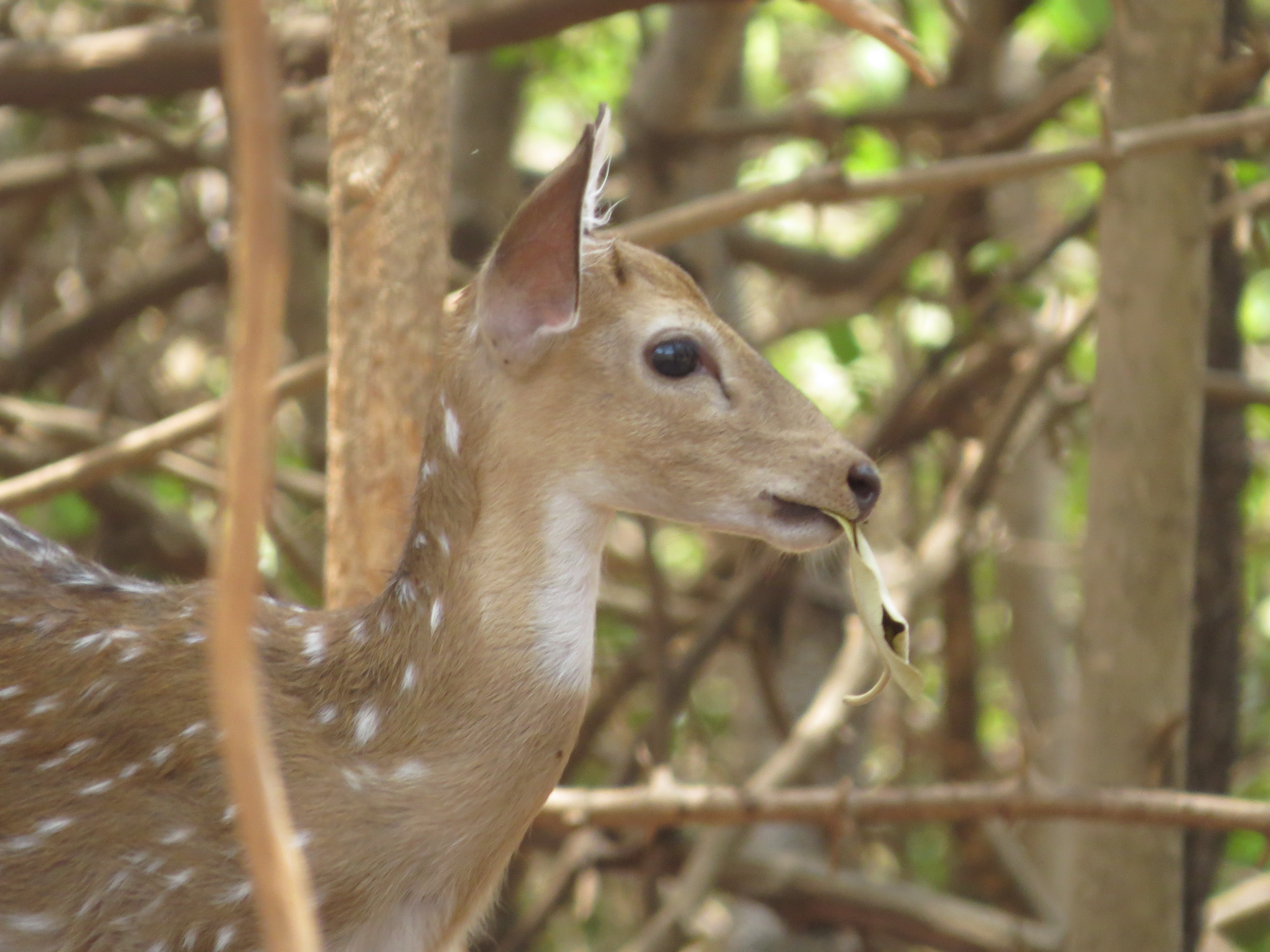
Baby cheetal deer

Dadra and Nagar Haveli lies within the North Western Ghats moist deciduous forests ecoregion, characterised by forests of teak (Tectona grandis) and other dry-season deciduous trees.

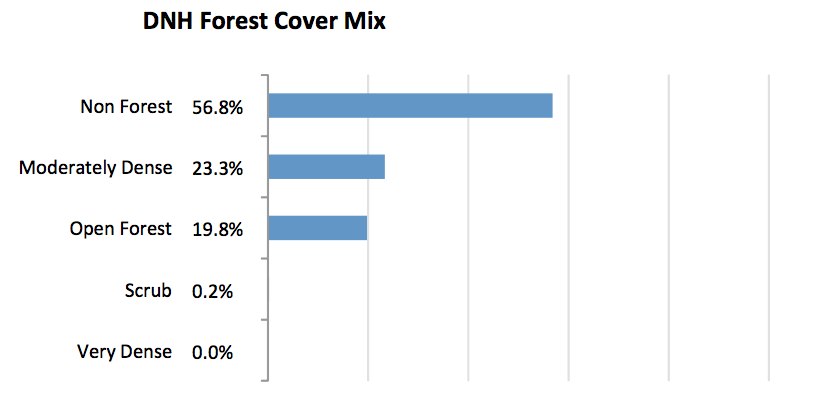

About 43% of the land is under forest cover. However, the reserved forest territory constitutes about 40% of the total geographical area. The protected forests constitute 2.45% of the total land area.

According to satellite data taken in 2008, DNH has roughly about 114 square kilometres (28,000 acres) of moderately dense forest and 94 square kilometres (23,000 acres) open forest. According to the Forest Survey of India, DNH has two major forest types: tropical moist deciduous forest and tropical dry deciduous forest. The major produce is khair wood and general timber. Teak, sandra, khair, mahara and sisam are the major tree species in the region.

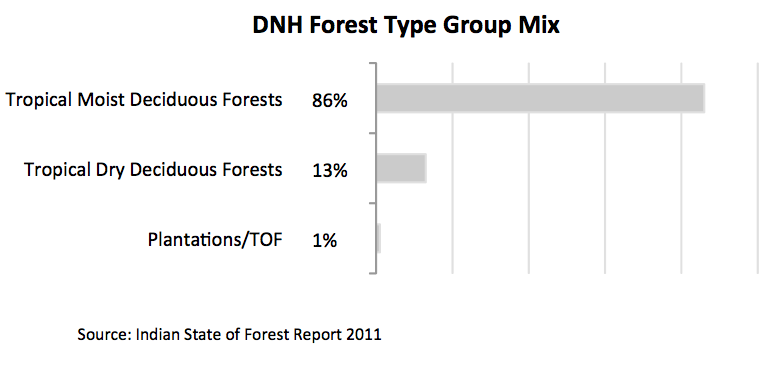

Tree cover has been estimated around 27 km^{2} from the six-year data (2002–08), which is around 5.5% of the total geographical area of DNH.

The Dadra and Nagar Haveli Wildlife Sanctuary covers 91.39 square kilometres, or about 19% of the union territory's total area. The sanctuary provides a habitat for leopard (Panthera pardus), wildcat (Felis silvestris), striped hyena (Hyaena hyaena), fox (Vulpes spp.), golden jackal (Canis aureus), nilgai (Boselaphus tragocamelus), four-horned antelope (Tetracerus quadricornis), sambar deer (Rusa unicolor), and chital deer (Axis axis), and birds including black drongo, bulbul, kingfisher, egret, hoopoe, mynah, heron, and red jungle fowl. In 2014 an additional eco-sensitive area was designated in the 100-meter buffer zone around the wildlife sanctuary, with an area of 26.57 square kilometres.

The rich biodiversity makes it a habitat for a variety of birds and animals and thus a destination for inland and coastal safari and eco-tourism. Silvassa's hills and wide, forested buffer land attract wildlife enthusiasts.

There is a wildlife protected area located,

- Dadra and Nagar Haveli Wildlife Sanctuary

=== Climate ===
The climate of Dadra and Nagar Haveli is typical of its type. Being near the coast, all but the sparsely inhabited easternmost parts have a typical north Indian Ocean maritime climate. The summers are hot and become in their later part more humid with temperatures reaching as high as 39 °C in the month of May. The monsoon starts in the month of June and extends until September. The rainfall is brought by southwest monsoon winds. It is known as the Cherrapunji that covers the bulk of western India (apart from the Thar Desert) which produces most of the annual rainfall of 200–250 cm. Winters are between maritime temperate and semi-tropical with temperatures ranging from 14 °C to 30 °C, reliably, as with the monsoon, with scant deviation from this range.

== Administration ==
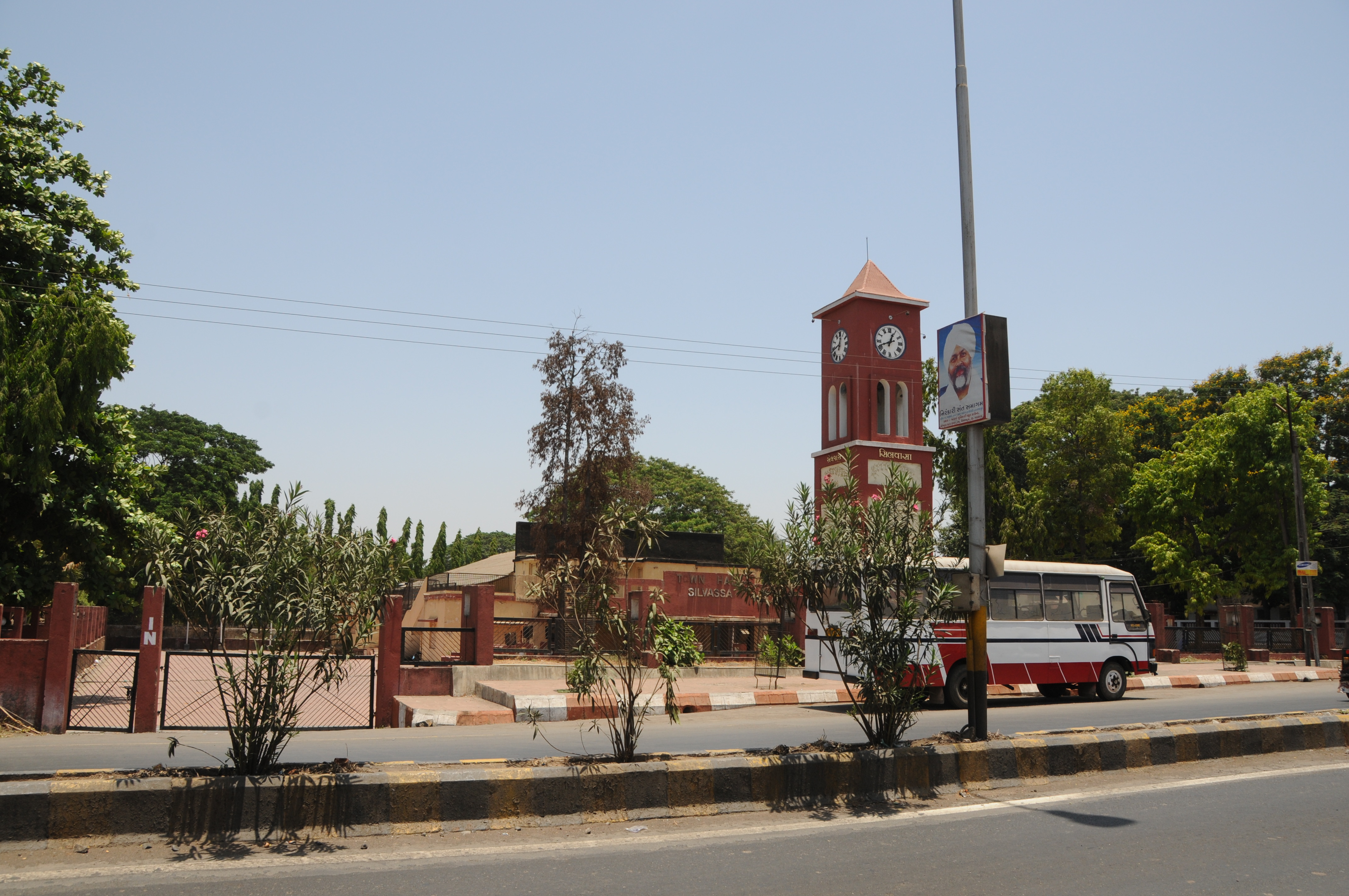
Silvassa Town Hall

Dadra and Nagar Haveli covers an area of 487 km^{2} and consists of two sub-districts:

- Dadra
- Nagar Haveli

=== Dadra ===
Dadra is the headquarters of Dadra taluka, comprising Dadra town and two other villages.

Settlement type	Portuguese name	Indian name
Town	Dadrá	Dadra
Village	Vagadi	Demni
Village	Tigrá	Tighra

=== Nagar Haveli ===
Silvassa is the headquarters of Nagar Haveli taluka, comprising Silvassa town and 68 other villages.

== Economy ==
Dadra and Nagar Haveli's gross state domestic product for 2004 is estimated at $218 million in current prices. Its nominal GDP increased to $360 million in the year 2009 with a per capita GDP of $1,050. The economy of DNH relies on five major activities viz. agriculture, industries, forestry, animal husbandry and tourism.

=== Agriculture ===
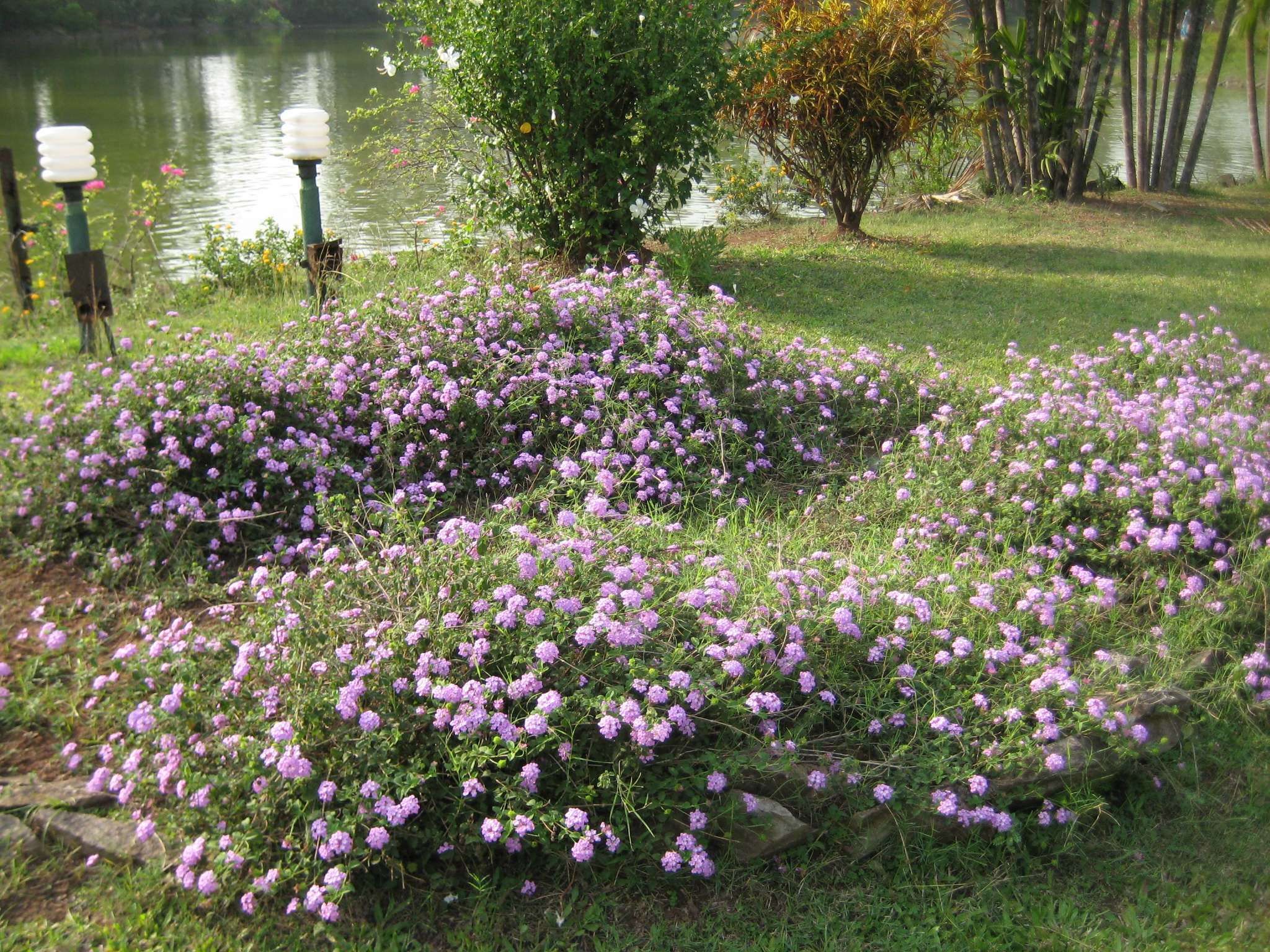
Blossom at Vanganga Lake, Dadra

The basic economic activity of the territory is agriculture involving about 60% of the working population. The total land area under cultivation is 236.27 square kilometres (58,380 acres) i.e. 48% of the total geographical area. The area under high yielding crops is 12,000 acres (49 km^{2}). The main food crops cultivated in this area are paddy (40% of the net sown area), ragi, small millets, jowar, sugarcanes, tur, nagli and val. Vegetables like tomato, cauliflower, cabbage and brinjal and fruits like mango, chikoo, guava, coconut and banana are also grown. Agriculture sector has given a major boost to the economy of DNH.

The local population is also involved in forestry and animal husbandry. 92.76% of the farmers belong to the weaker sections and 89.36% of them are tribal farmers. There is a full-fledged veterinary hospital and nine veterinary dispensaries. Mass vaccination against various diseases is done regularly free of cost by the Animal Husbandry Department.

=== Industry ===
Another major contributor to the economy is the manufacturing industries. Due to heavy industrialisation in the region owing to tax sops for industries in the union territories, steady growth in employment has been observed. The employment generation is increasing at a pace of 5% per annum.

Industrialisation in the area began in 1965 when the first industrial unit in the UT was started at Piparia, Silvassa in the cooperative sector by Dan Udyog Sahakari Sangh Ltd, following which three industrial estates were established at Masat (1976), Khadoli (1982) and Silvassa (1985). Earlier (before 1965) only traditional craftsmen who made clay pots, leather items, viz., chappals, shoes and some other items of bamboo were present. Since there was no sales tax in the UT, it attracted many entrepreneurs. Around 30 new units comprising Engineering, fabric weaving units and dyeing and printing units were established until 1970.

In 1971, UT was declared as an industrially backward area by Government of India and increased the cash subsidy to 15 to 25% for the industrial units on their capital investment which resulted in the speedy industrial development. The scheme was however terminated from 30 September 1988. Sales Tax Act was implemented from January 1984 until 1998 under which industries enjoyed sales tax exemption for 15 years from the start-up date. VAT was introduced in 2005. At present, the newly established units get Central Sales Tax exemption which will continue until 2017.

There are more than 2710 units functioning providing employment to about 46000 people with a capital investment of ₹377.8310 million (US$3.9 million).

Type	Number
Small scale industries	2118
Medium scale industries	564
Large scale industries	28

== Demographics ==
Historical population
Year	Pop.	±%
1951	42,000	—
1961	58,000	+38.1%
1971	74,000	+27.6%
1981	104,000	+40.5%
1991	138,000	+32.7%
2001	220,000	+59.4%
2011	342,853	+55.8%
Source: Census of India

According to the 2011 census Dadra and Nagar Haveli has a population of 343,709. This gives it a ranking of 566th in India, out of a total of 640 districts. It has a population density of 698 inhabitants per square kilometre (1,810/sq mi), and its population growth rate over the decade from 2001 to 2011 was 55.5 percent, which is the highest percentage growth among all Indian states and union territories. Dadra and Nagar Haveli has a sex ratio of 775 females for every 1,000 males, and a literacy rate of 77.65%.

=== Ethnography ===
Tribal groups make up 62% of the population. The most prominent are Dhodia (16.90%), Kokna (16.85%) and Warli (62.94%), with small groups of Koli, Kathodi, Naika, and Dubla scattered across the territory, collectively representing 3.31% of the population. Dhodias and Dublas mainly populate the Northern part, whereas Koknas and Warlis are found all over the Union Territory. They worship the primary deities of Dis (Sun) and Chand (Moon), and Narandev, Kanasari, Himai, Hirva, Veer, Rangtai and Vagdev.

One prominent feature of this territory is that people from all over India form a part of non-tribal residents. DNH has many industries due to tax concessions granted to industry and therefore people from all over the country have migrated to the region. North Indians have a prime influence in the area. Gujarati is one of the three official languages, the others being Hindi and English. Besides Gujarati persons, one can find Marathi, Rajasthani, Bihari, Udia, Tamil, Uttar Pradeshi and people from several other states. The prime reason for such a diverse population is the industrial hub. Employment opportunities, good climate, and the landscape are highly appealing.

=== Religion ===
As per the 2001 Census, out of the 137,225 ST persons of the UT, almost all were Hindus except for 3,796 Christians (2.8%). As a former Portuguese enclave, Silvassa has a significant Roman Catholic population. Kokna has the highest Christian population in 2001, 6.7%. Swetambara Jains have a temple in Dadra and Silvassa and recently Digambara Jains have also constructed a temple in the Silvassa.

Religion in State (2011)
1. Hinduism (93.9%)
2. Islam (3.75%)
3. Christianity (1.48%)
4. Jainism (0.34%)
5. Buddhism (0.18%)
6. Sikhism (0.06%)
7. Other Religions (0.08%)
8. Atheist (0.00%)

=== Language ===
There are 72 villages, mainly inhabited by various tribal communities like the Warly (Warlie), Kokana, Dhodia, Koli, Kathodi, Naika, Dubla and Kolgha. The tribal communities are locally known as Adivasi (which means original inhabitant). Each community has its own culture, traditions and languages and dialects. None of these languages have had written literature until recently. The tribal communities consist of approximately 60% of the population of DNH. (Earlier in the eighties it was more than 80%, but after influx from different parts of the country, the percentage has reduced). But the influx has helped the tribal people in increasing their earnings and standard of living.

Warli is the language spoken by the Warli people. Agri the dialect of Marathi which is spoken by Agri community.

Languages Dadra and Nagar Haveli (2011)
1. Bhili (37.3%)
2. Hindi (26.2%)
3. Gujarati (21.5%)
4. Marathi (7.01%)
5. Konkani (2.26%)
6. Odia (1.30%)
7. Bengali (0.91%)
8. Others (3.62%)

The languages taught in schools in Dadra and Nagar Haveli under the three-language formula are as follows:

1. First Language: Gujarati, Hindi, Marathi
2. Second Language: Marathi, Gujarati
3. Third Language: English

A former Portuguese enclave, Silvassa has a significant Roman Catholic population, speaking a distinct dialect of Portuguese. Marathi and Gujarati languages are widely spoken. Hindi and Marathi are also understood.

The main tribes are Warlis, Dhodia Kokna, etc.

=== Castes ===
The prominent castes occupying this territory are Rajputs, Ahirs, Chamar, Mahar, and associated castes.

=== Tribes ===
Warli

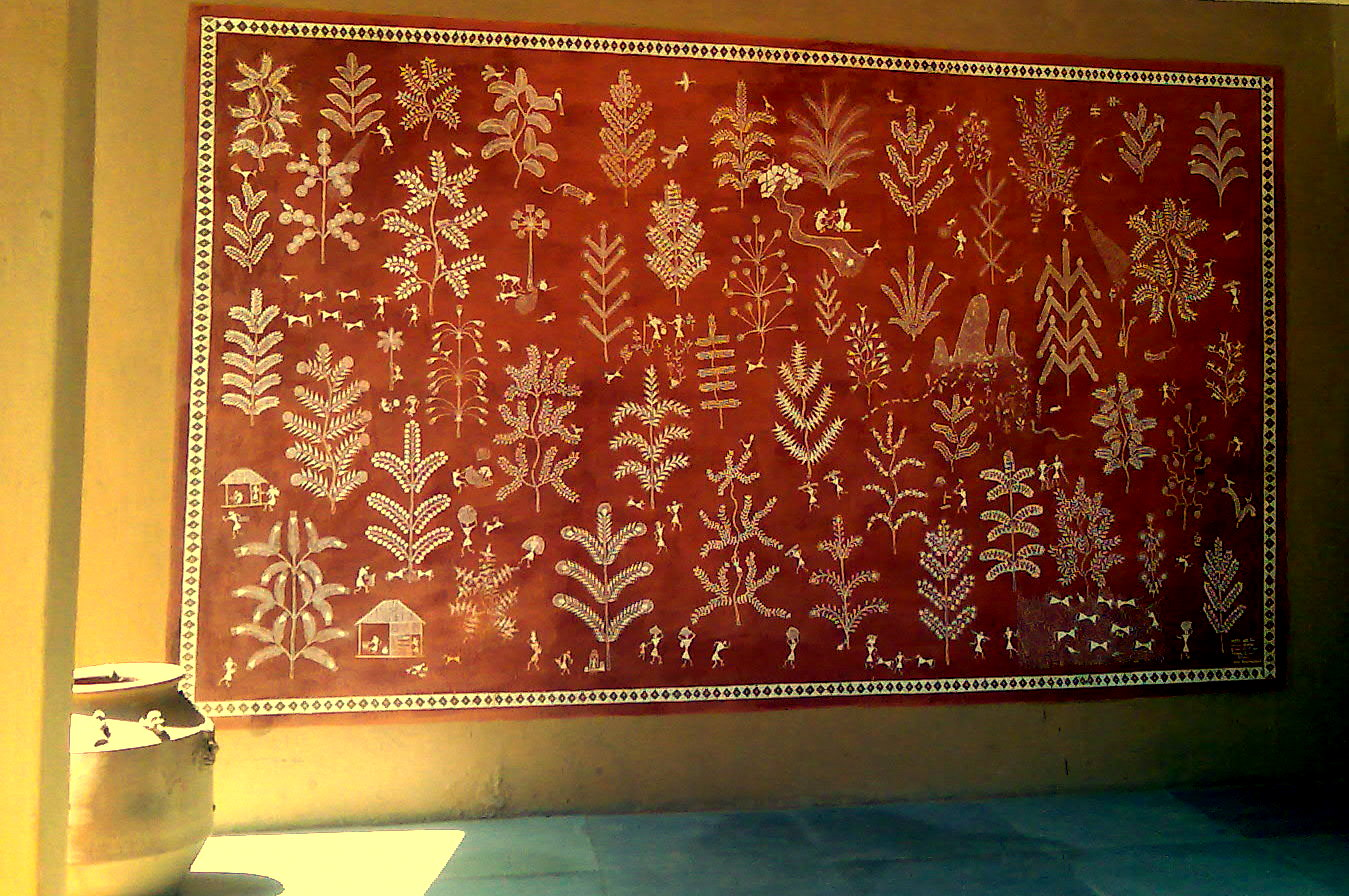
Warli Painting at Saskriti Kendra, New Delhi

Although commonly associated with Maharashtra, and also found in Gujarat, Warlis consider the Union Territory of Dadra and Nagar Haveli to be their original home. The Warlis speak an Indo-Aryan language related to Marathi and Konkani and are the largest tribal group in the territory and constitute ~ 63% (62.94%) of the total tribal population.

Rituals are extremely important to the Warlis; they are nature worshipers who regard the Sun and the Moon as the eyes of God. Their main deities are Naran dev, Hirwa, Himai, and Waghio, and stone images of these deities are found in tree groves. A Bhagat plays the Ghangal (a musical instrument made from gourd, bamboo and iron strings) and performs the rituals.

Traditionally the Warlis wear a loin cloth with a small waist coat and a turban. The women wear a knee-length, one-yard saree – lugde – and adorn themselves with silver and white metal ornaments.

Dhodia

The term Dhodia seems to be derived from Dhundi, which means a small thatched hut, and the Dhodias are primarily hut dwellers. They reside mostly in the northern part of Dadra & Nagar Haveli. They are known to be the most educated among all the tribes and are good cultivators. Some own enough farmland to be able to earn a decent livelihood.

Traditionally the men wear a white knee-length dhoti with a shirt or waistcoat, white or coloured caps, and ornaments like earrings and silver chains around their waist. The women wear a knee-length dark blue saree with an aanchal worn from the front and left loose at the back. Popular accessories include colourful bead necklaces, and metal ornaments such as bangles or thick kadaas around their ankles.

Kokna

The Koknas derive their name from the Konkan region in West India. They have land of their own, produce paddy and are better cultivators than the Warlis. With the introduction of formal education many of them have moved up the social ladder.

Koknas well built and both men and women often tattoo their bodies, especially their foreheads. The men wear a dhoti up to the knees, with a waistcoat or shirt and a turban. The women wear traditional colourful sarees that are either knee-length or full length.

Kathodia

The Kathodis, called Katkari in the Thane district of Maharashtra, make up 0.08% of the total tribal population of Dadra & Nagar Haveli. Their name is derived from their profession of kattha or catechu making.

They are considered to be at the bottom of the tribal social ladder. They usually live in forests, in semi-permanent settlements. Most of them cut wood and collect charcoal. The government has tried to improve their standard of living by engaging them in permanent professions. They wear minimal jewelry; what is worn adorns the women only.

== See also ==
- Portuguese Empire
- Portuguese India
- Annexation of Goa
- Goa
