= Fudam Bird Sanctuary =

Bird sanctuary in India

- Fudam Bird Sanctuary, Diu
- IUCN category IV (habitat/species management area)
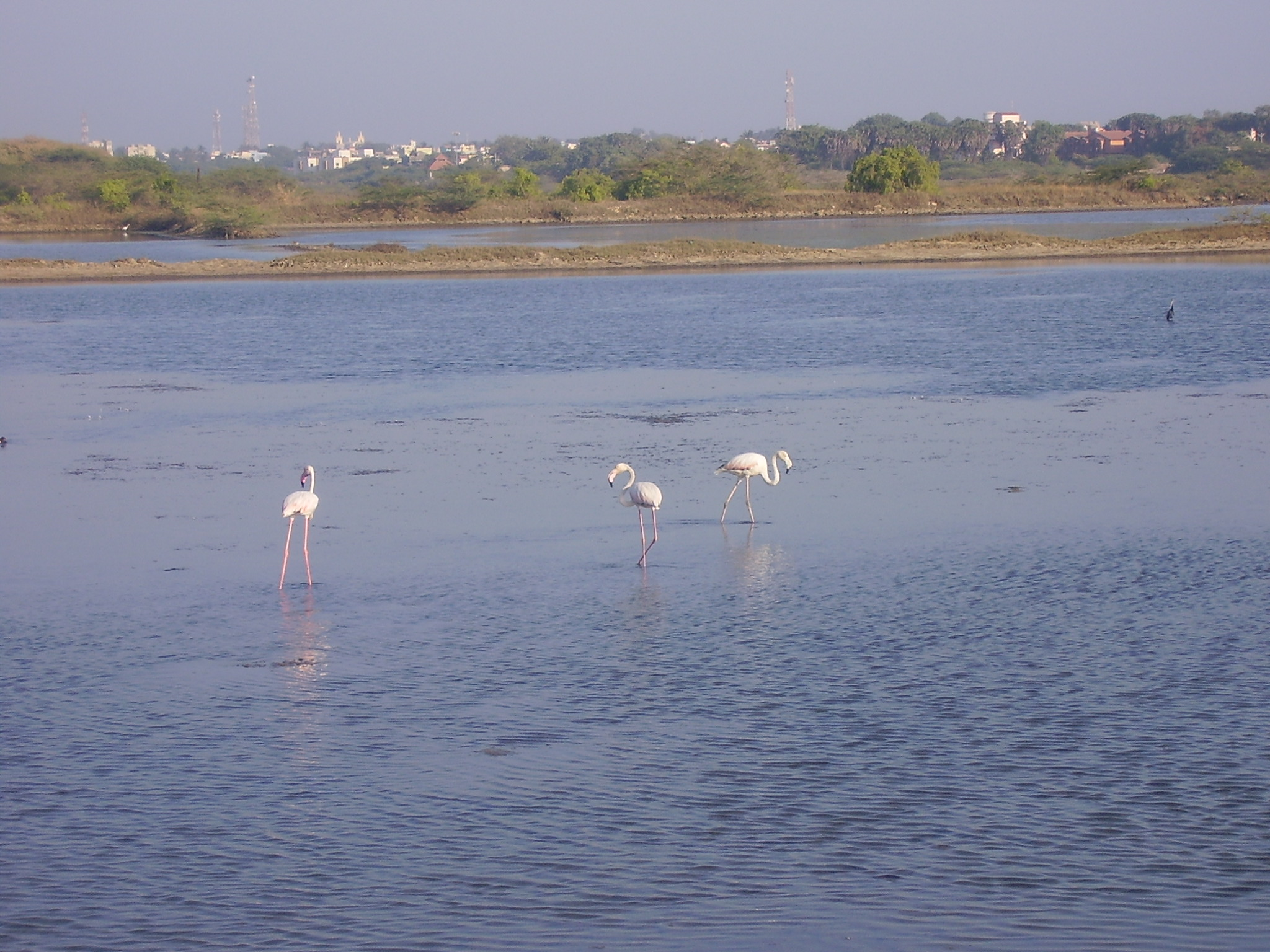
- Flamingoes inside Fudam Bird Sanctuary
- Interactive map of Fudam Bird Sanctuary
- Location: Diu, Dadra and Nagar Haveli and Daman and Diu, India
- Nearest city: Diu
- Area: 2.18 km^{2} (0.84 sq mi)
- Established: 1991
- Governing body: Diu Tourism
- Website: www.diutourismgov.in

Fudam Bird Sanctuary is a bird sanctuary location on Diu Island of the Indian Union Territory of Dadra and Nagar Haveli and Daman and Diu. This site is a marshland and thus home to migratory birds like Flamingos, locally called Surkhaab.

== Fauna ==
Birds found in the area include the Painted Stork, Paddy field Pipit, Purple Sun Bird, Cattle Egret, Grey Plover, Clamorous Reed Warbler, Striated Heron, Red Neck Phalarope, Red Wattled Lapwing, Indian Carmorant, Red-vented Bulbul, Comb Duck, House Crow, Black Winged Stilt, Asian Palm Swift and Sanderling.

Bird census conducted in 2025, shows nearly 108 species in the sanctuary including waterfowl, waders etc.

The site has an observatory tower from where birdwatchers can site the entire wetland. Near a forest office is also located.
