= List of districts of Dadra and Nagar Haveli and Daman and Diu =

The Union territory of Dadra and Nagar Haveli and Daman and Diu, India consists of three districts.

Map of Dadra and Nagar Haveli and Daman and Diu, showing its three districts as well as general location within India.

== Districts ==
#	District	Area, (km^{2})	Population (2011)	Density (per km^{2})
1	Daman	72	190,855	2,650.76
2	Diu	40	52,056	1,301.40
3	Dadra and Nagar Haveli	491	342,853	698.27
Total		603	585,764	970
