= Silvassa =

- City
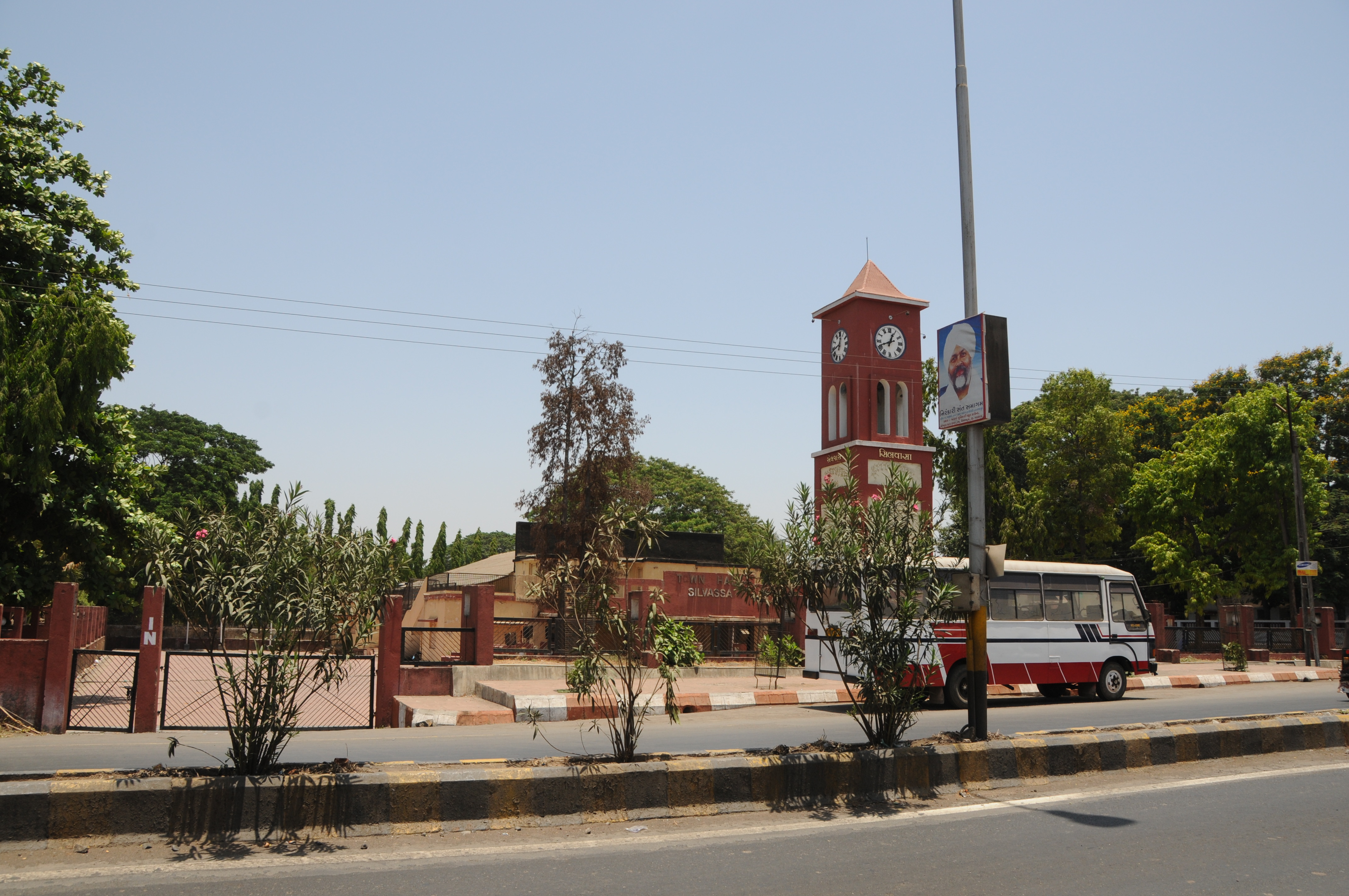
- Silvassa Townhall

- Location within India Location within Dadra and Nagar Haveli Location within Gujarat
- Coordinates: 20.2708162°N 73.0049524°E
- Country: India
- Union territory: Dadra and Nagar Haveli and Daman and Diu
- District: Dadra and Nagar Haveli
- Established: 1885

Government
  - Type: Municipal Council
  - Body: Silvassa Municipal Council
  - Mayor: S. Deore

Area
  - Total: 16 km^{2} (6.2 sq mi)
- Elevation: 32 m (105 ft)

Population (2011)
  - Total: 98,266
  - Density: 6,100/km^{2} (16,000/sq mi)

Languages
  - Official: Hindi, Gujarati
- Time zone: UTC+5:30 (IST)
- Postal code: 396230
- Telephone code: 0260
- Vehicle registration: DD-01
- Website: dnh.gov.in

Silvassa is a city and the headquarters of the Dadra and Nagar Haveli district in the Union territory of Dadra and Nagar Haveli and Daman and Diu in western India. It is today the largest city in the union territory. The city was chosen as one of the hundred Indian cities in Government of India's flagship Smart Cities Mission.

== Etymology ==
The former official name of the city, during Portuguese rule, was Paço de Arcos (Engl.: "palace of arches", also spelled Paço d'Arcos), named after the town of that same name located in Oeiras, Lisbon.

== History ==
Until about the turn of the century, in the late 1800s, Silvassa was one of many small villages in Portuguese India. Its importance started to increase by the mid-1880s when the Portuguese administration, under then Governor-General Carlos Eugénio Correia da Silva, Count of Paço de Arcos, decided to transfer the seat of the Pragana Nagar Avely municipality further inland from Darará. On 11 February 1885, by decree from the Portuguese Ministry of the Overseas, Silvassa was designated as a town (vila), and given the name of Paço de Arcos. However, the endemic name prevailed, and the town continued to be known locally and beyond as Silvassa, being referred-to as such in official documents. The town remained the municipal capital until the Indian Annexation of 1954.

== Demographics ==
According to the 2011 India census, Silvassa had a population of 98,265.

== Language ==
Gujarati and Hindi are the most commonly spoken languages in Silvassa; as the city lies in the northern part of Nagar Haveli, Gujarati and its dialects are more widely spoken compared to the southern part of Nagar Haveli, where Marathi, Konkani and its dialects hold prominence. As with most larger towns and cities in India (with a somewhat centralised location), Silvassa is home to people from virtually every part of the nation, with numerous languages being spoken there besides the widespread Hindi, Marathi or Gujarati; one may hear Bengali, Bhojpuri, Haryanvi, Kannada, Malayalam, Marwari, Odia, Punjabi, Tamil, Telugu or Urdu, amongst other tongues, when in Silvassa.

As a former Portuguese colony, Silvassa has a significant Roman Catholic population, and there are still a few citizens who speak Portuguese as their first or second language.

== Industry ==
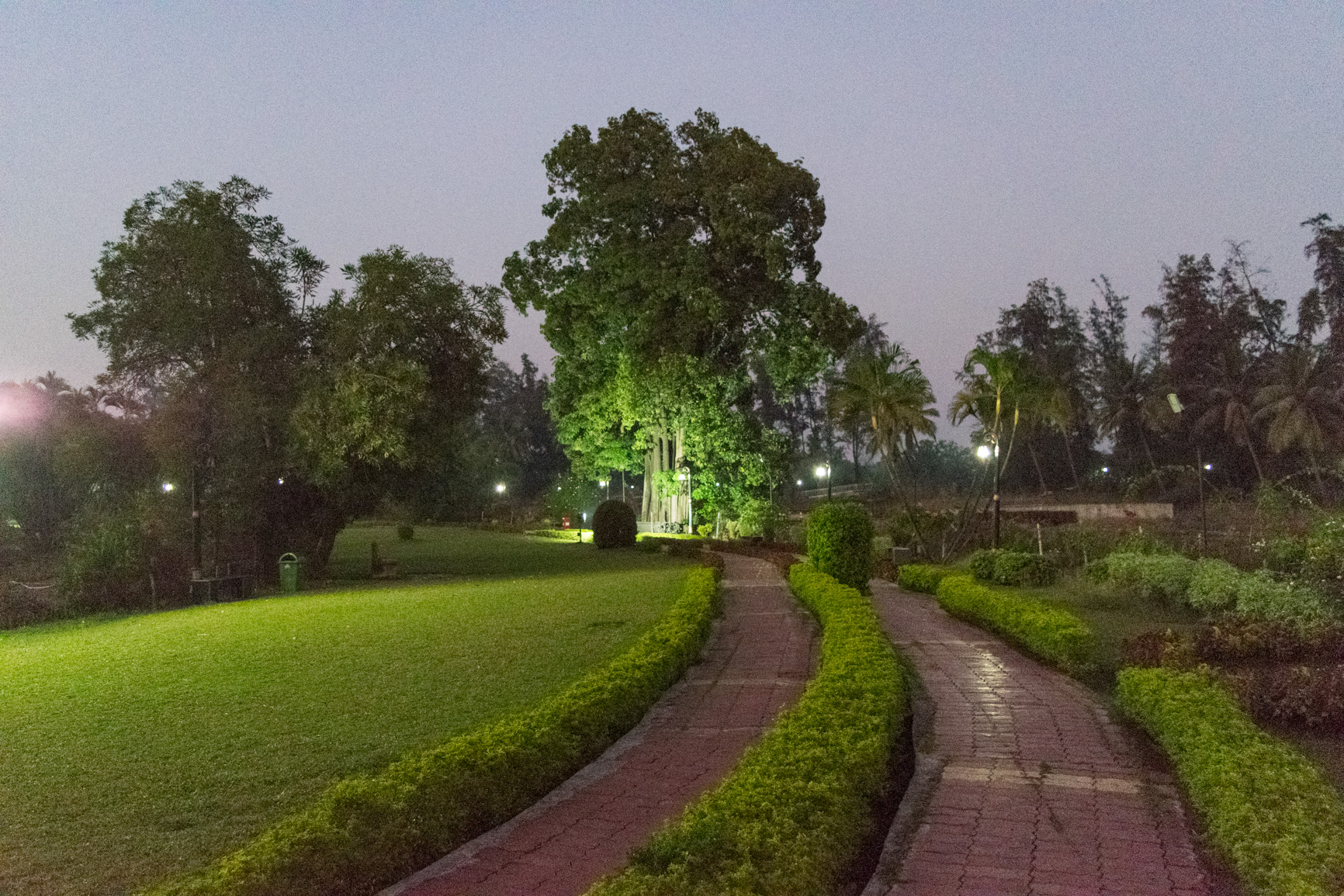
Vanganga Garden, Silvassa

Far from being a tribal region, Silvassa has now developed into an industrial hub with major industrial companies setting up manufacturing bases in the region. Its initial tax-free status granted by the Indian government to boost industrial investment in the former Union Territory of Dadra and Nagar Haveli has contributed to the region's industrial growth. The industrial landscape of Silvassa and surrounding region has been altered dramatically. It is one of the largest states in collection of excise duty from more than 3,500 small and medium industries. Silvassa is a big hub for plastic products and its products are found throughout India thanks to their good quality and low cost. Apart from all this, Silvassa is also known for various FMCG distributors like Gajra Distribution having reach throughout the country.

Silvassa hosts more than 200,000 floating population, coming from all parts of the country; the laborers mostly hail from Uttar Pradesh, Bihar and Odisha. Other floating community is from the states of Madhya Pradesh, Maharashtra, Gujarat, Kerala, Karnataka, Tamil Nadu, Andhra Pradesh, and Rajasthan.

== Transport and connections ==
Silvassa is connected to Maharashtra and Gujarat via National Highway 848A. Silvassa has a well-maintained road network. The nearest railway stations are in Vapi 16 kilometres (9.9 mi) away and Bhilad, 14 kilometres (8.7 mi) away. Daman is 30 km away via Bhilad on National Highway number 8. Mumbai is 160 km away from Silvassa, via Bhilad, on National Highway number 8 Surat is 130 km away from Silvassa, via Bhilad, on National Highway number 8. Auto-rickshaw services ply between Vapi and Silvassa at a regular interval and easily available from Vapi (E) railway station. Gujarat Road Transport Buses ply between Silvassa and Vapi at a regular interval.

Silvassa Smart City Limited currently operates 10 Electric Buses to and from the Silvassa Bus Stand, destinations include Daman, Vapi, Khanvel, Dudhani, and Mandoni.

== See also ==
- Portuguese India
- Dadra and Nagar Haveli
- Dadra and Nagar Haveli and Daman and Diu
- Annexation of Dadra and Nagar Haveli
- Amli
