= Amli, India =

Amli
- Town
- Location within India
- Coordinates: 20.28°N 73.02°E
- Country: India
- State: Dadra and Nagar Haveli and Daman and Diu
- District: Dadra & Nagar Haveli
- Elevation: 26 m (85 ft)

Population (2001)
  - Total: 28,566

Languages
  - Official: Hindi, Gujarati
- Time zone: UTC+5:30 (IST)
- PIN: 396230

Amli is a census town in the Union Territory of Dadra & Nagar Haveli and Daman and Diu in India.

== Geography ==
Amli is located at 20.28°N 73.02°E. It has an average elevation of 26 metres (85 feet).

== Demographics ==
As of 2001, India census, Amli had a population of 28,566. Males constitute 39% of the population and females 61%. Amli has an average literacy rate of 70%, higher than the national average of 59.5%. About 15% of the population is under 6 years of age.
