= Dadra and Nagar Haveli and Daman and Diu =

Union territory of India

- Union Territory
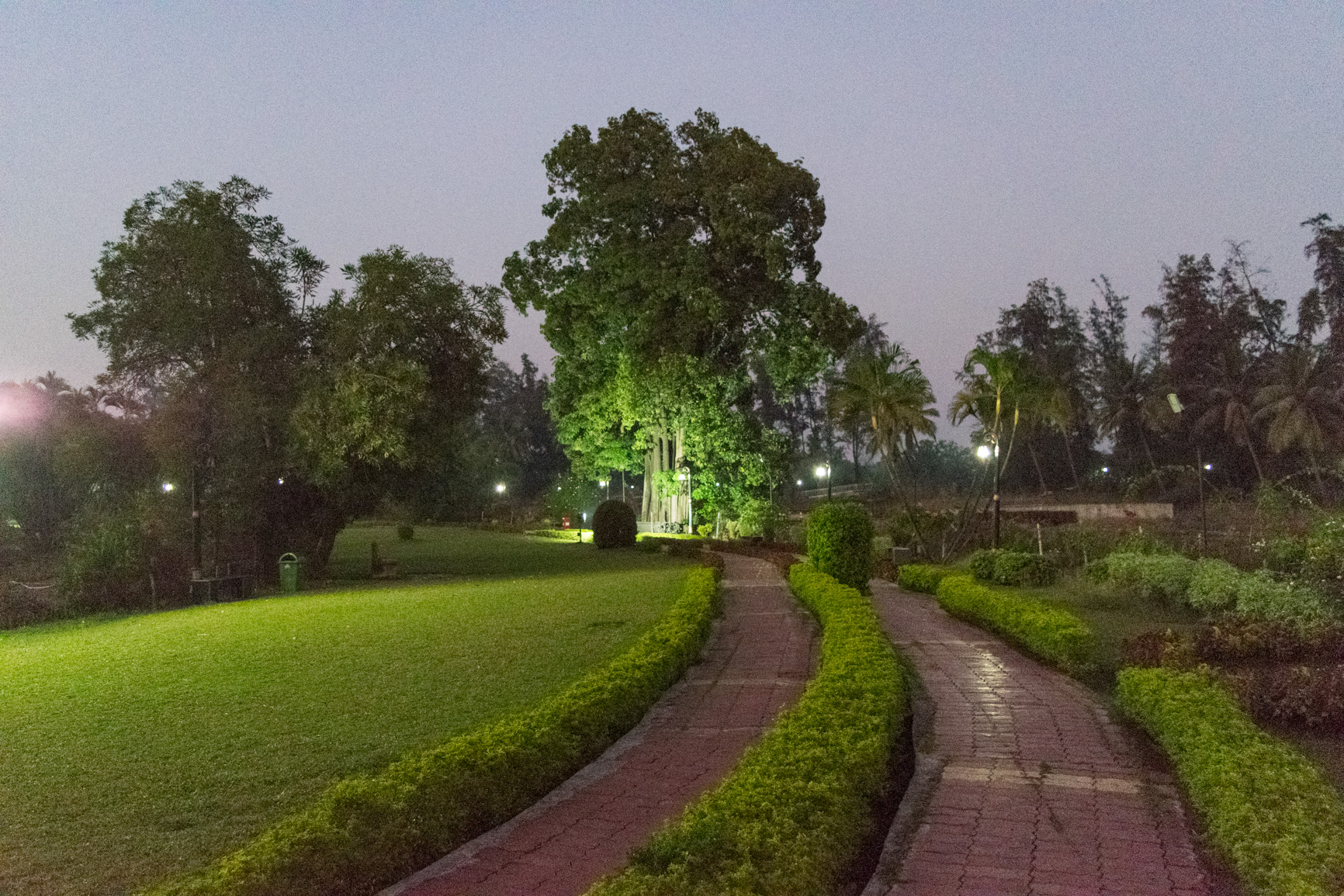
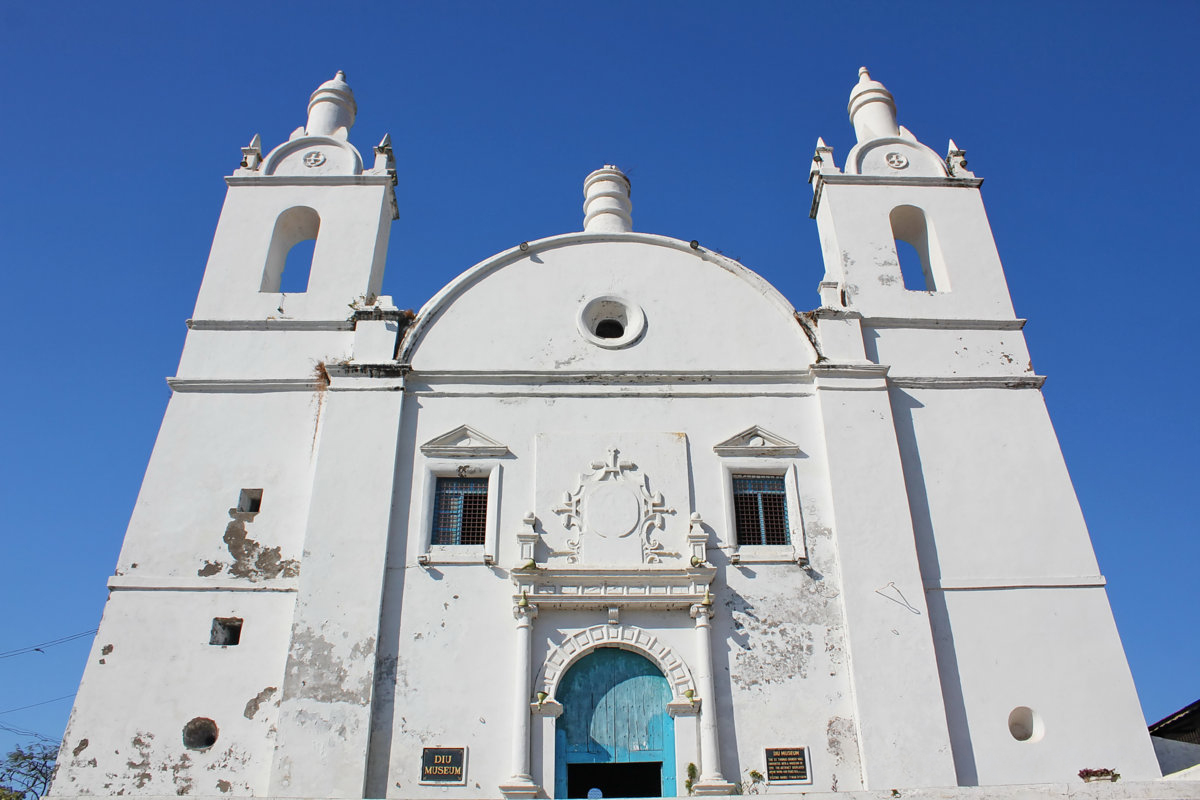
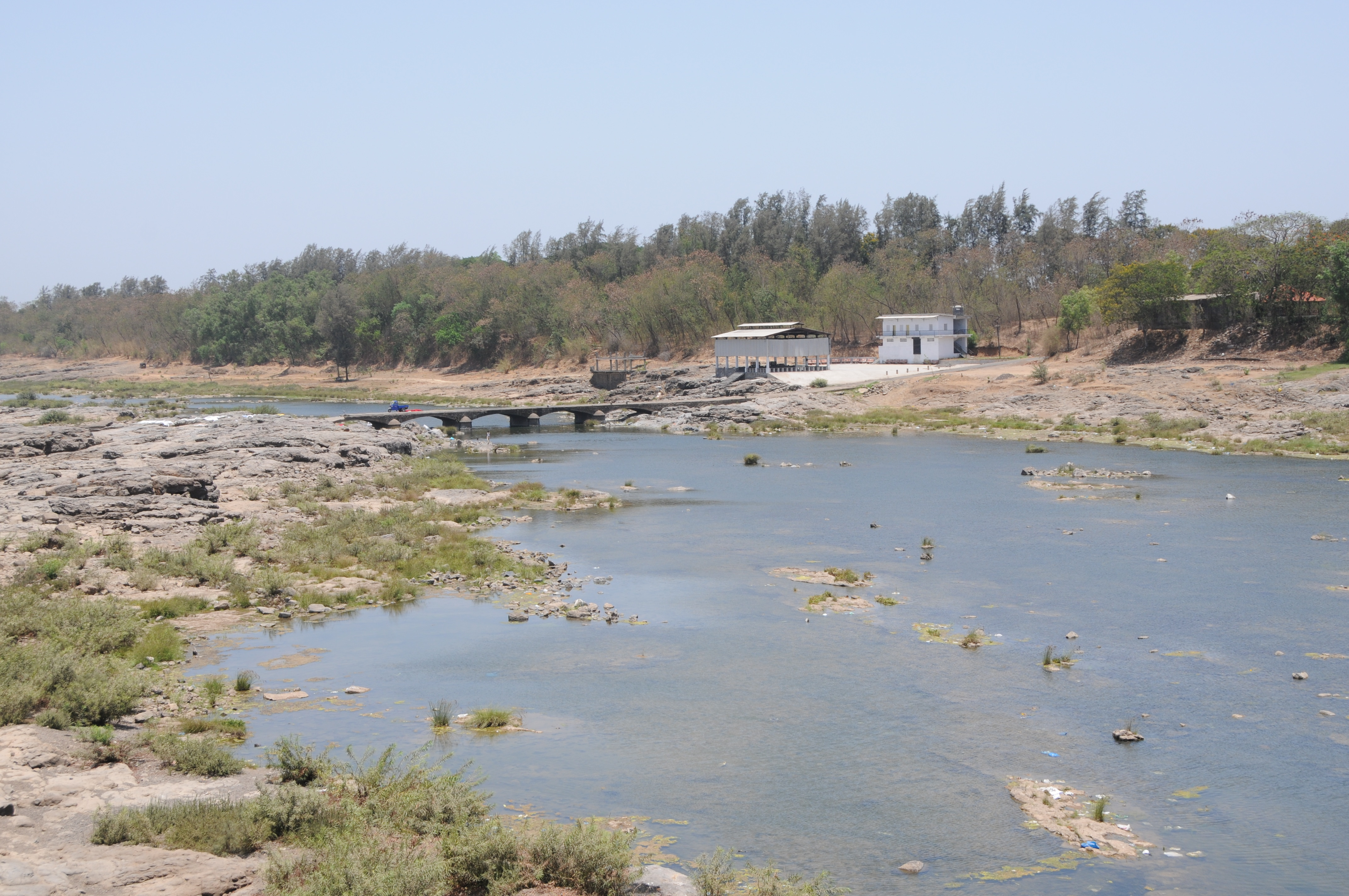
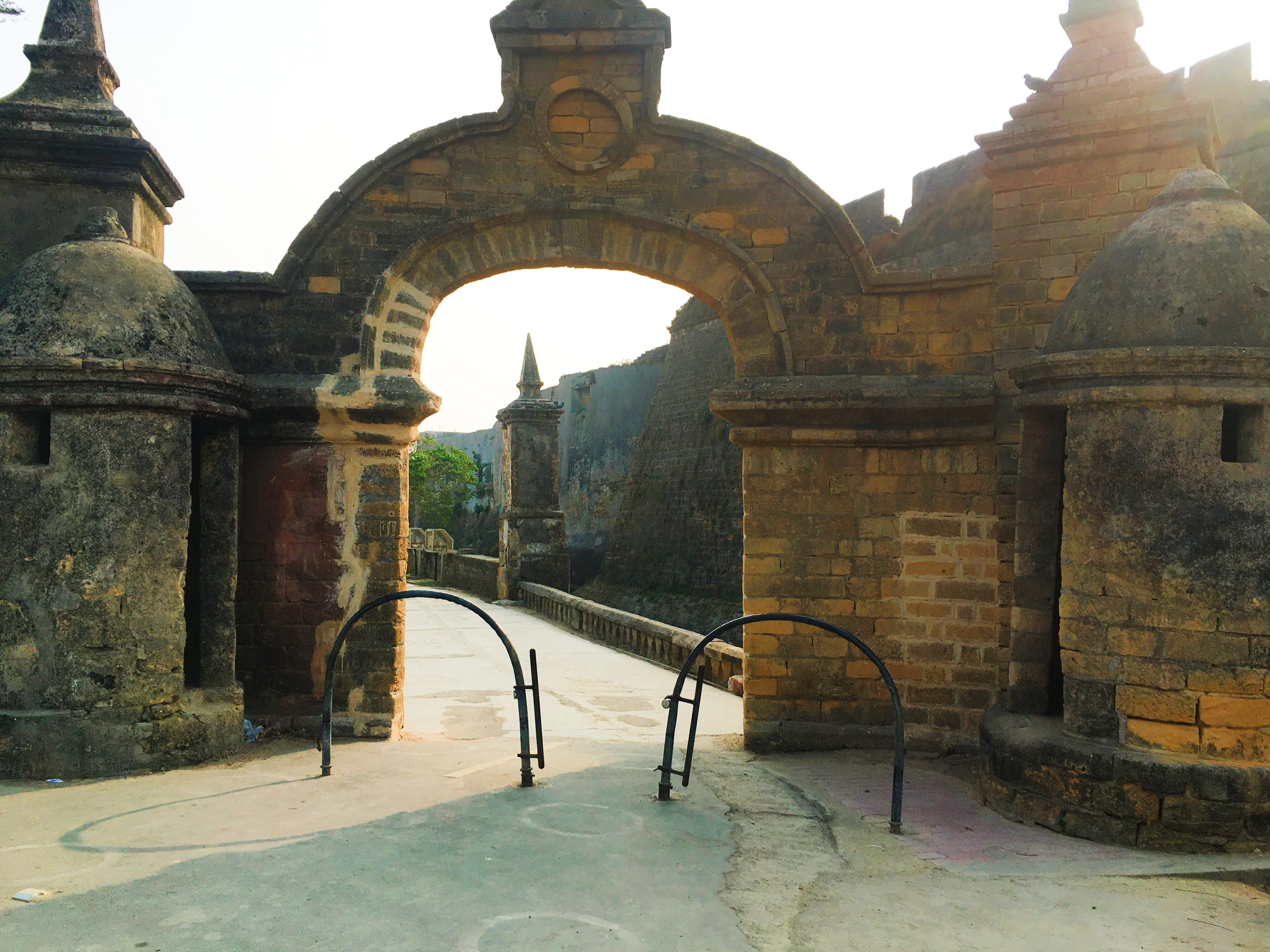
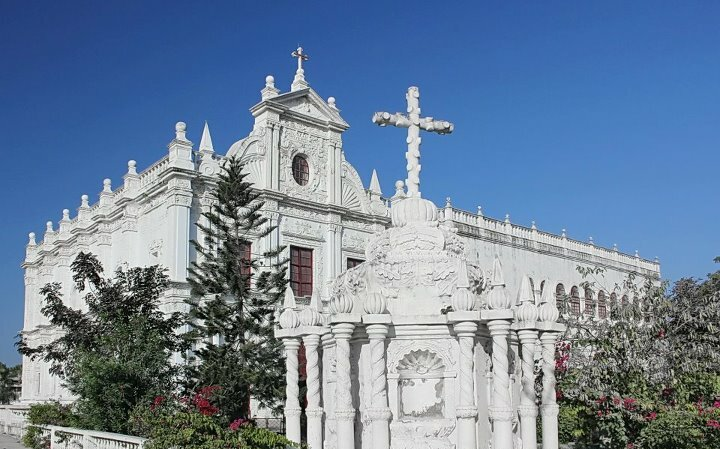
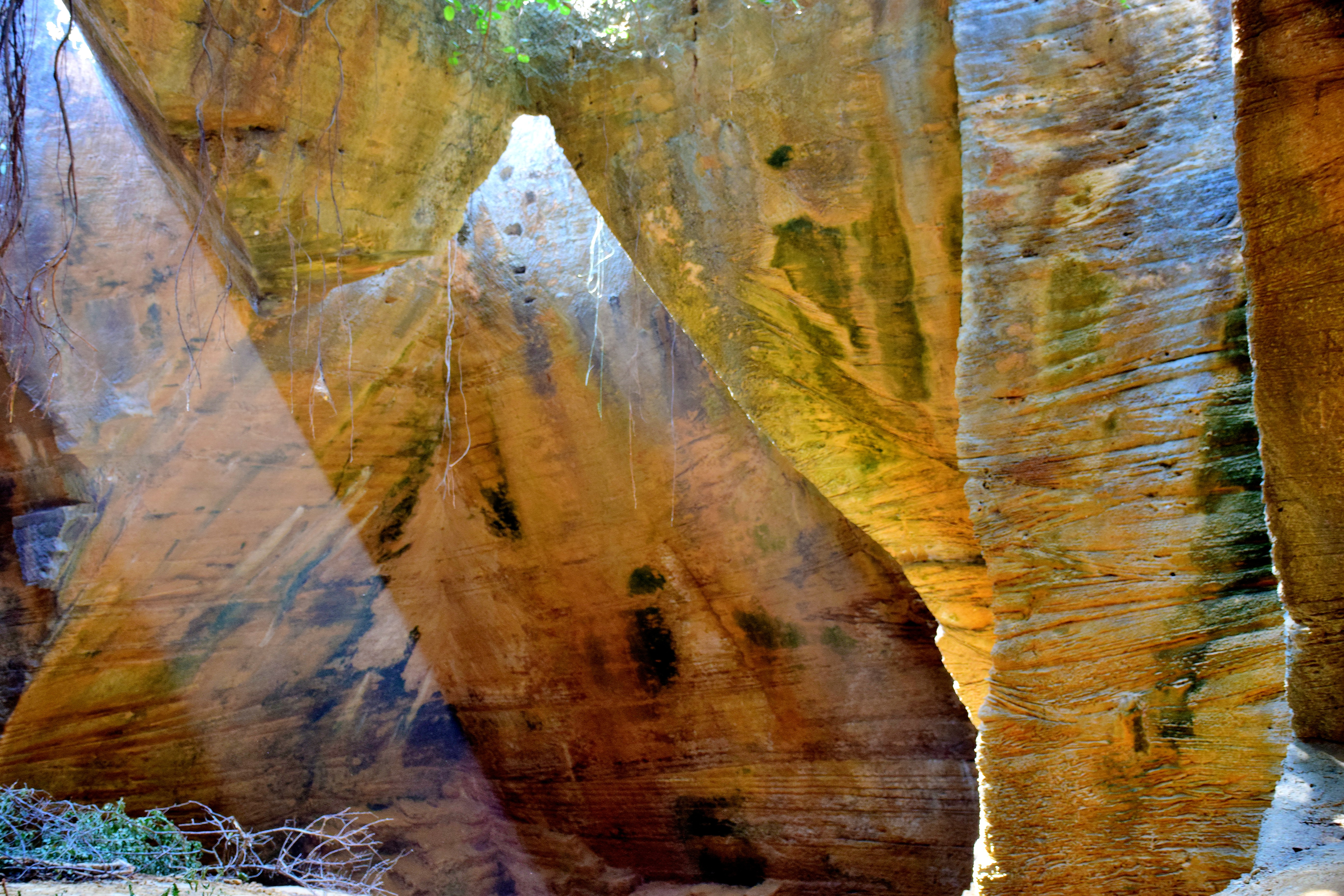
- Vanganga Garden, Silvassa St. Thomas Church, Diu Damanganga River, Silvassa Diu Fort, Diu St. Paul's Church, Diu Naida Caves, Diu

- Emblem of Dadra and Nagar Haveli and Daman and Diu

- Location of Dadra and Nagar Haveli and Daman and Diu in India
- Coordinates: 20.42°N 72.83°E
- Country: India
- Region: Western India
- Formation: 26 January 2020
- Capital: Daman, India
- Largest city: Silvassa
- Districts: 3

Government
  - Body: Government of Dadra and Nagar Haveli and Daman and Diu
  - Administrator: Praful Khoda Patel
  - Chief Secretary: Ankur Garg, IAS

Area
  - Total: 603 km^{2} (233 sq mi)
  - Rank: 33rd
- Elevation: 8 m (26 ft)
- Highest elevation: 425 m (1,394 ft)
- Lowest elevation: 0 m (0 ft)

Population (2011)
  - Total: 585,764
  - Density: 970/km^{2} (2,500/sq mi)

Language
  - Official: Hindi, Gujarati
- Time zone: UTC+05:30 (IST)
- ISO 3166 code: IN-DH
- Vehicle registration: DD
- Literacy (2024): 87.8% (13th)
- Website: ddd.gov.in

Dadra and Nagar Haveli and Daman and Diu (Note: Hindi pronunciation: [ˈd̪ɑːd̪ɾɑː ɔːɾ ˈnəɡəɾ ɦəˈʋeːliː ɔːɾ ˈd̪əməɳ ɔːɾ ˈd̪iːʋ]; Gujarati pronunciation: [ˈd̪ɑd̪ɾɑ ˈəne ˈnəɡəɾ ɦəˈʋeli ˈəne ˈd̪əməɳ ˈəne ˈd̪iʋ]) is a union territory in India. The territory was constituted through the merger of the former territories of Dadra and Nagar Haveli and Daman and Diu. Plans for the proposed merger were announced by the Government of India in July 2019; the necessary legislation was passed in the Parliament of India in December 2019 and came into effect on 26 January 2020. The territory is made up of four separate geographical entities: Dadra, Nagar Haveli, Daman, and the island of Diu. All four areas were formerly part of Portuguese India, with the joint capital at Panjim, Goa. They came under Indian rule in the mid-20th century after the Annexation of Goa and the Free Dadra and Nagar Haveli campaign. Goa, Daman and Diu were jointly administered until 1987, when Goa was granted statehood after the Konkani language agitation. The current capital is Daman and Silvassa is the largest city.

== History ==
Map of Dadra and Nagar Haveli and Daman and Diu, showing its three districts as well as general location within India.

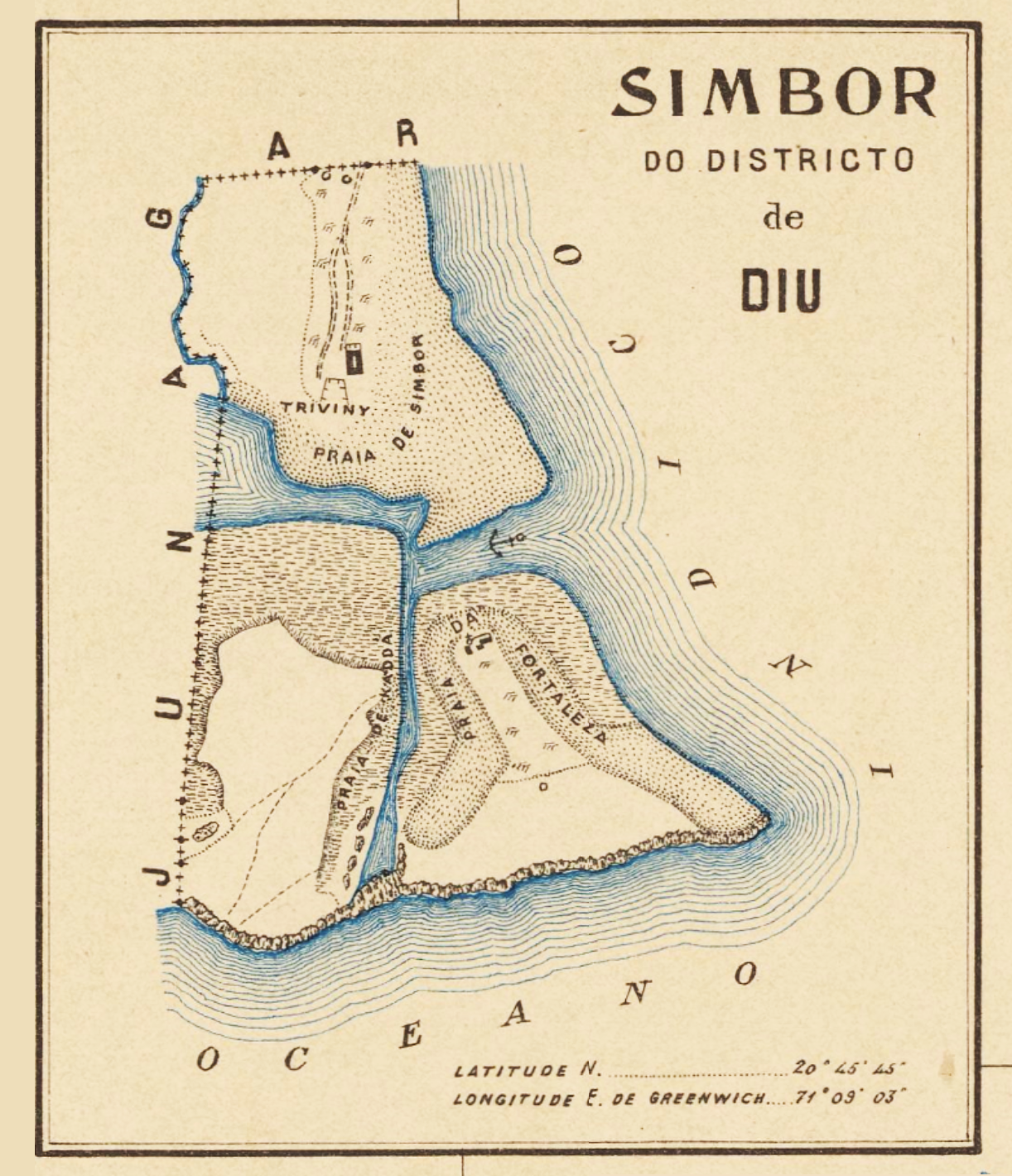
Territory of Simbor

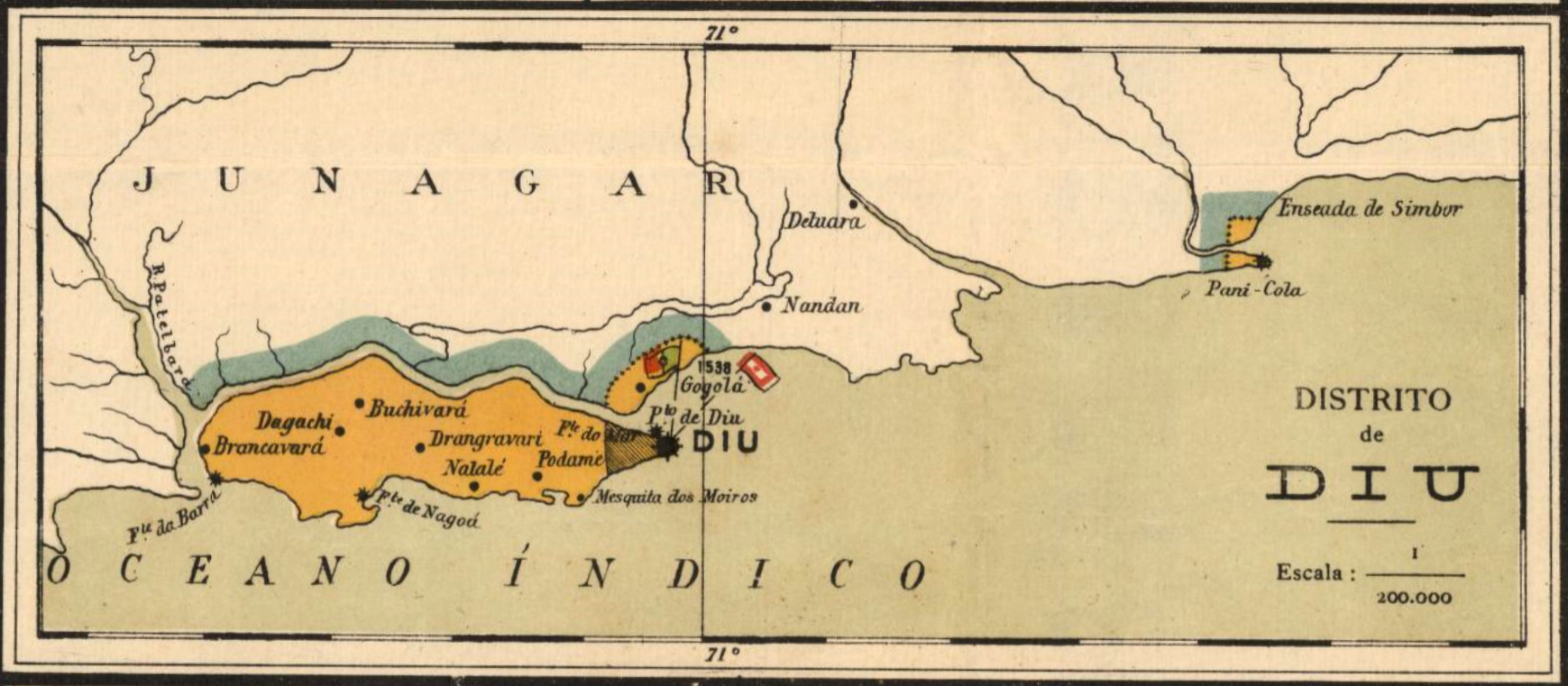
Portuguese map showing the district of Diu, including Simbor

Daman and Diu were Portuguese colonies from the 1520s until annexed by India on 19 December 1961. Dadra and Nagar Haveli were Portuguese territories from 1779 until annexed by the Indian army on 11 August 1961. Portugal officially recognised Indian sovereignty over the areas in 1974 following the Carnation Revolution.

Daman and Diu were administered as part of the union territory of Goa, Daman and Diu between 1962 and 1987, becoming a separate union territory when Goa was granted statehood.

In July 2019, the Government of India proposed merging the two territories into a single union territory in order to reduce duplication of services and reduce the cost of administration. Legislation to this effect, the Dadra and Nagar Haveli and Daman and Diu (Merger of Union Territories) Bill, 2019, was tabled in the Parliament of India on 26 November 2019 and assented to by the President of India on 9 December 2019. The two union territories had previously shared a common administrator and government officials. The town of Daman was chosen to be the capital of the new combined union territory. The appointed day for the act to come into effect was notified as 26 January 2020 by the Government of India.

== Geography ==
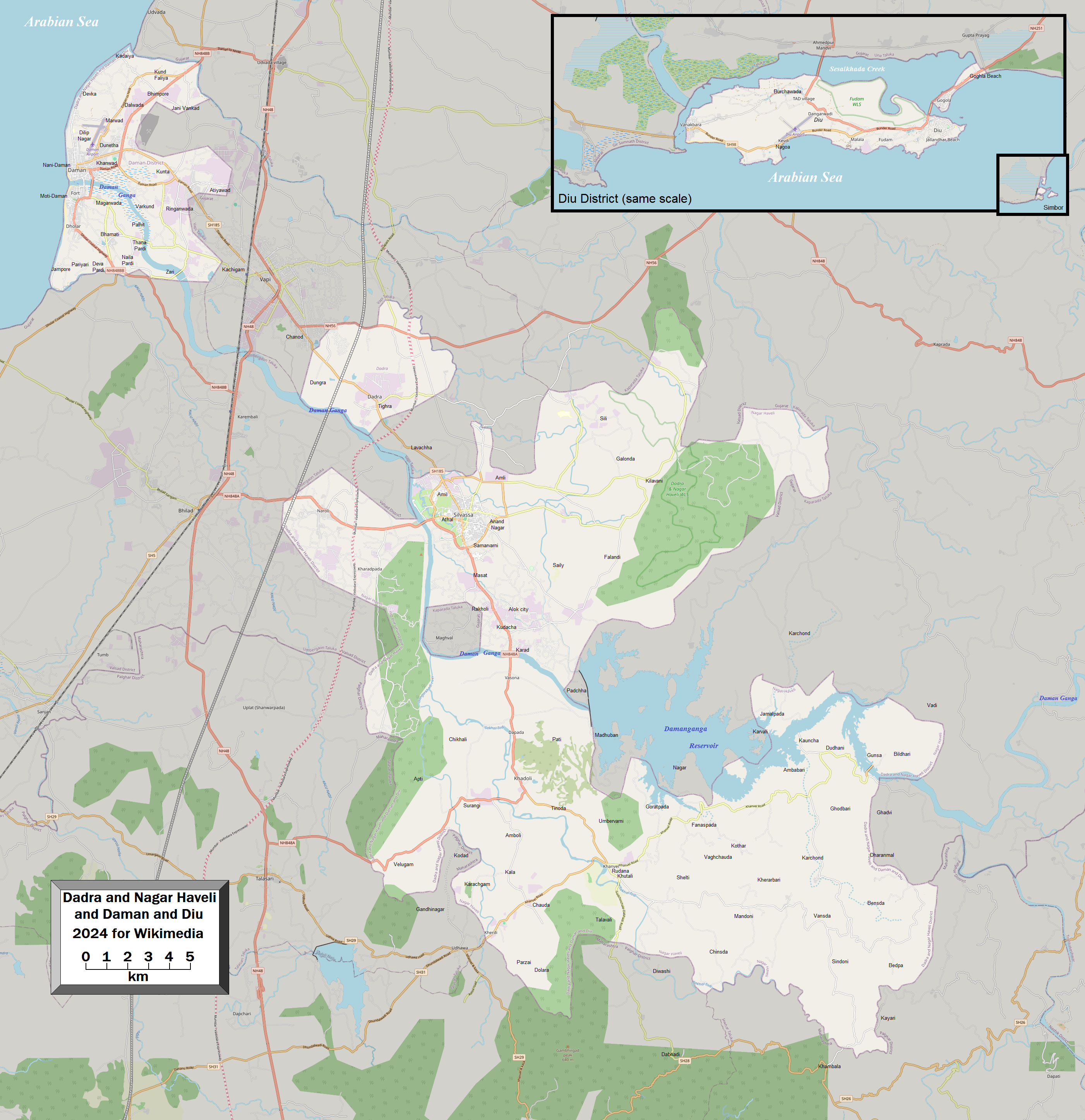
Detailed map of the union territory.

Dadra and Nagar Haveli and Daman and Diu is composed of four distinct areas located in Western India. Dadra is a small enclave within the state of Gujarat. Nagar Haveli is a C-shaped enclave located between the states of Gujarat and Maharashtra which contains a counterenclave of Gujarat around the village of Maghval. Daman is an enclave on the southeast coast of Gujarat, while Diu is an island off the southcentral coast of Gujarat.

There are 2 wildlife sanctuaries in the territory- Dadra and Nagar Haveli wildlife sanctuary and Fudam bird sanctuary.

== Administration ==
Dadra and Nagar Haveli and Daman and Diu is administered as a union territory of India by virtue of Article 240 (2) of the Constitution of India. The President of India appoints an administrator to administer the territory on behalf of the central Government of India. The central government may appoint advisers to assist the administrator with his/her duties.

=== Districts ===
The union territory is made up of three districts:

No.	District	Area, km^{2}	Population, (2011)	Density, per/km^{2}
1	Daman	72	190,855	2,650.76
2	Diu	40	52,056	1,301.40
3	Dadra and Nagar Haveli	491	342,853	698.27
	Total	603	585,764	971.42

=== Law enforcement and justice ===
Law enforcement within the territory is the responsibility of the Dadra and Nagar Haveli and Daman and Diu Police. The territory falls under the jurisdiction of the Bombay High Court.

=== In the Parliament of India ===
Dadra and Nagar Haveli and Daman and Diu sends two members (MPs) to the lower house of the Indian parliament the Lok Sabha. The territory is divided into the constituencies of Daman and Diu and Dadra and Nagar Haveli.

== Demographics ==
=== Religion ===
Hinduism is the dominant religion in the territory with Hindus making up 92.4% of the population.

Religion in Daman and Diu and Dadra and Nagar Haveli
1. Hinduism (92.4%)
2. Islam (5.50%)
3. Christianity (1.30%)
4. Others (0.83%)

== See also ==
- Goan Civil Code
- Goa, Daman and Diu
- Portuguese India
- 2019 Daman Indigenous Land Clearing Protests
- Dadra and Nagar Haveli Lok Sabha constituency
- Daman and Diu Lok Sabha constituency
