= Nagar Haveli =

- Taluka
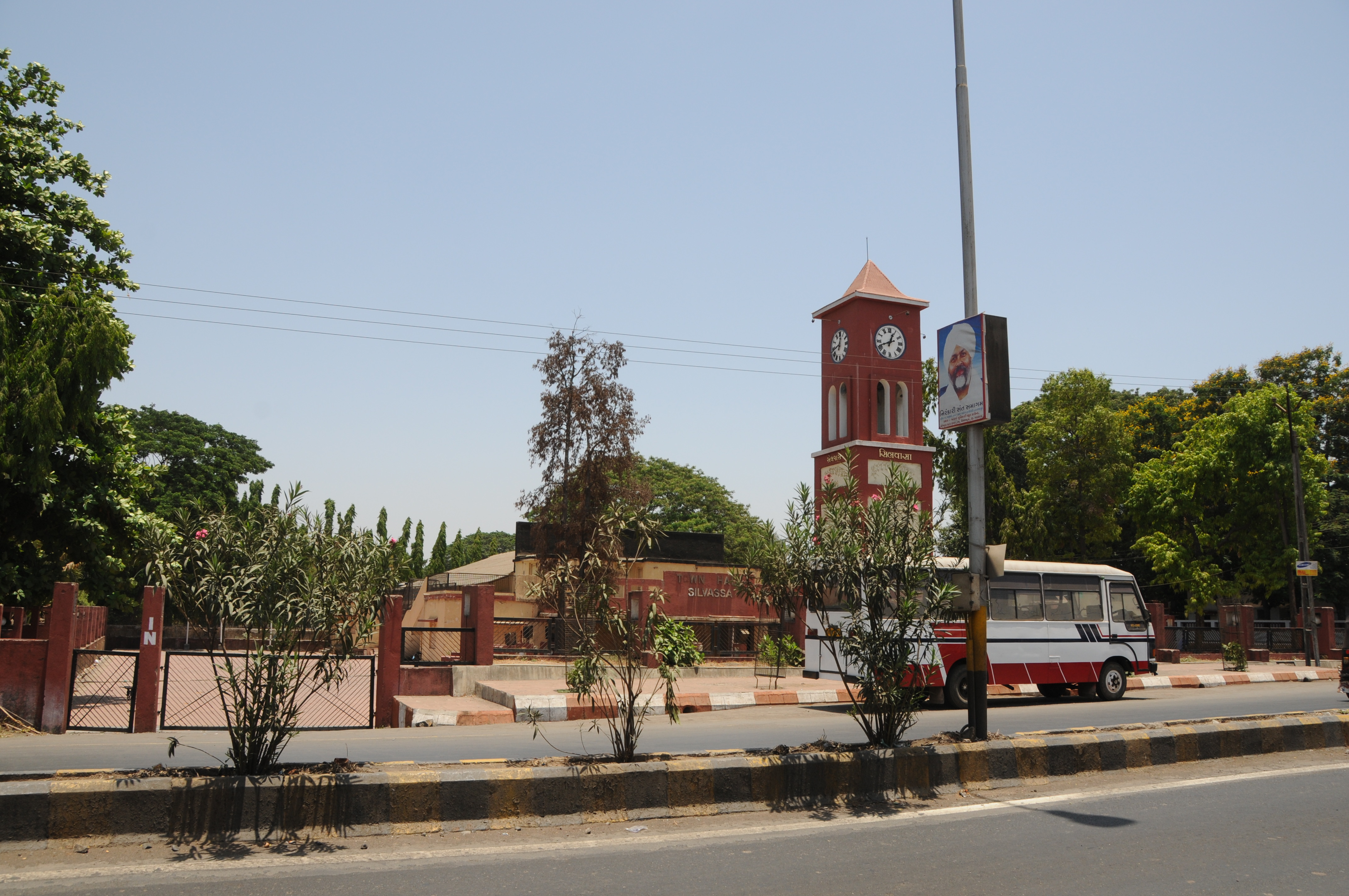
- Silvassa, Nagar Haveli

- Nagar Haveli location Nagar Haveli (India)
- Coordinates: 20.18°N 73.02°E
- Country: India
- Union Territory: Dadra and Nagar Haveli and Daman and Diu

Languages
  - Official: Hindi, English
  - Additional official: Gujarati
- Time zone: UTC+5:30 (IST)

Nagar Haveli (/ˌnɑːɡər həˈvɛli/) is one of the two talukas of Dadra and Nagar Haveli District, Dadra and Nagar Haveli and Daman and Diu, India. It is surrounded by the Indian states of Gujarat and Maharashtra.

Silvassa, the administrative headquarters of Dadra and Nagar Haveli, is located in the Nagar Haveli exclave. Silvassa has a large number of factories and industries providing significant government revenue, which allows the city to maintain a low level of taxation.

Silvassa is also considered to be the home of Warli culture. Warli is the language spoken by the Warli people which is similar to both Marathi and Gujarati.

Silvassa is known for its natural environment and gardens. The Hindi movie "Phool Aur Kaante" was shot here. The Lion Safari and Vasona Deer Park are new upcoming tourist attractions.

Other towns in Nagar Haveli are: Amli, Sili, Saili, Amal, Kanadi, Vasona, Velugam, Dolara, Sindavni, Khanvel, Dudhani.

There is a small enclave named Maghval belonging to Gujarat that is located within Nagar Haveli, just south of Silvassa.

Pratah Varta is a Hindi daily newspaper published from Silvassa.
