= Daman district, India =

Daman District
- District
- Location of Daman

- Daman district headquarters Daman (Gujarat)
- Coordinates: 20.41°N 72.89°E
- Country: India
- Union territory: Dadra and Nagar Haveli and Daman and Diu
- Tehsil: Daman Tehsil
- Headquarters: Daman

Government
  - District Collector: Rakesh Minhas, IAS

Area
  - Total: 72 km^{2} (28 sq mi)
- Elevation: 0 m (0 ft)

Population (2011)
  - Total: 191,173
  - Density: 2,700/km^{2} (6,900/sq mi)
- Demonym(s): Damanese, Damãocar

Languages
  - Official: Hindi, English
  - Additional official: Gujarati
- Time zone: UTC+5:30 (IST)
- Sex ratio: 1.69 ♂/♀
- Website: http://daman.nic.in/

Daman district (English: /də'mɑːn/, Gujarati: [d̪əmən]) is one of three districts of the Indian union territory of Dadra and Nagar Haveli and Daman and Diu. It is located on the west coast of India and is surrounded by the Valsad district of Gujarat to the north, east, and south; and by the Arabian Sea to the west. The district covers an area of 72 square kilometers (28 sq mi) and had a population of 191,173 as of the 2011 census, an increase of 69.256% from the 2001 census. The district headquarters is Daman. The territorial headquarters were previously in Panjim when it was jointly administered as Goa, Daman, and Diu until the time of the Konkani language agitation.

Daman lies at the mouth of the Daman Ganga River. The closest railway station is Vapi, which is 7 km away. Surat is to the north, and Mumbai is approximately 160 km (100 mi) to the south in the Konkan division of Maharashtra.

== History ==
The edict of Emperor Ashoka (273 to 136 BC) was found in Saurashtra and Sopara near Bombay. The Satraps under the Kushana emperor seem to have ruled over Daman District during the 1st century AD. Coins of Bhumaka and Nahapan, the Kshaharata rulers, were discovered in the surrounding areas of Surat District. Ushavadatta, Nahapan's son-in-law, is said to have provided ferries on the Dhanuha, Dhamana, Parada, and Tapi rivers.

The river's names—Dahanu, Daman, and Pardi—have remained unchanged for the last 2,000 years. The district seems to have been subjected to the rule of Gautamiputra Satakarni around 125 AD, who drove away the Kshaharatas. However, the Satavahana's rule was short-lived.

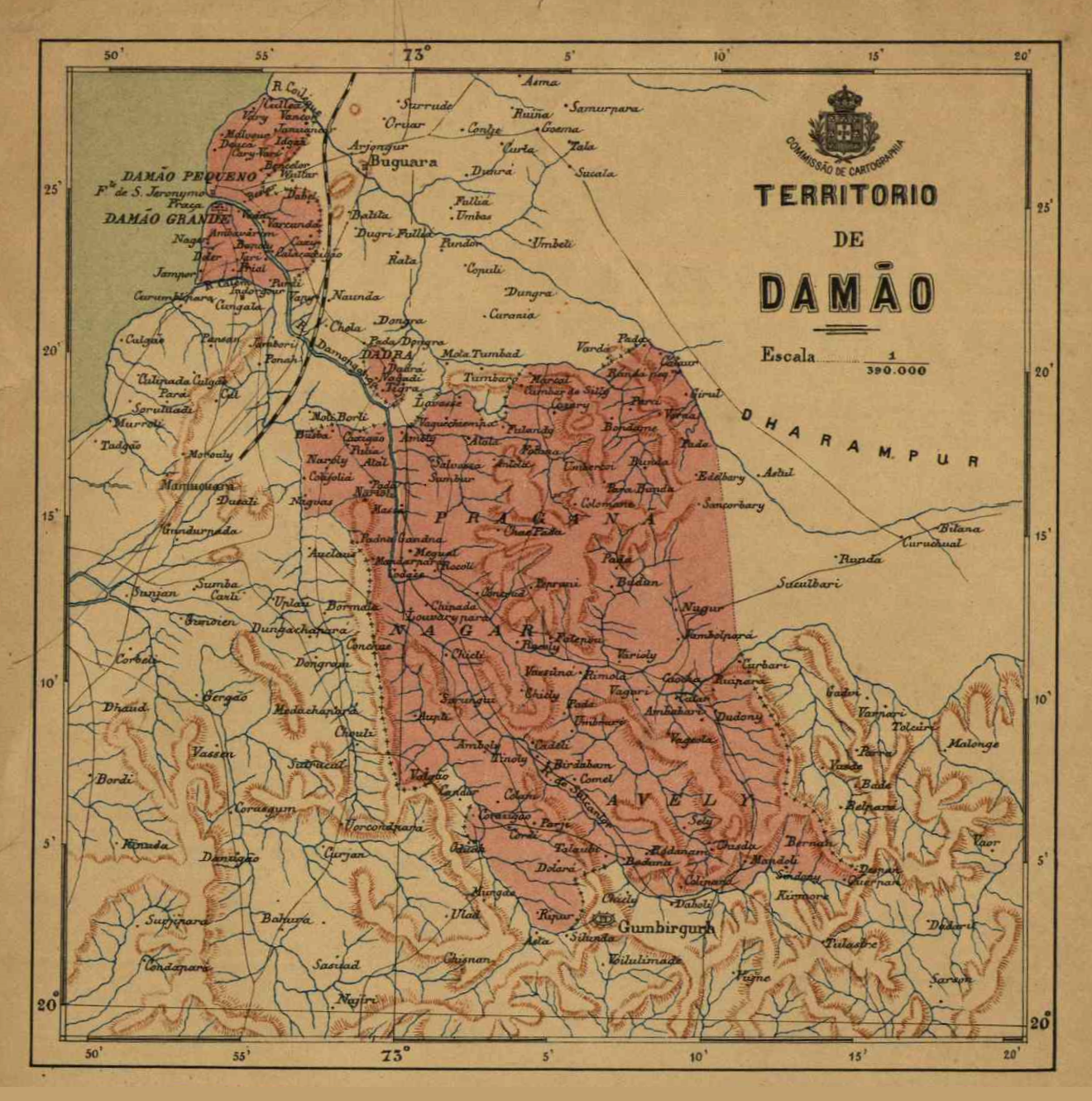
The territory of Daman during the Portuguese colonial period

Govinda III handed over the Lata kingdom to his brother Indra around 808 AD, giving him the title Lateswaramandalasya or the Protector of Latamandala. Indra was succeeded by his son Karka, who seems to have ruled Latamandala jointly with his brother Govinda until 826. Druva II, son of Karka, ascended the throne around 835 and was succeeded by Akalavarsha in 867. The district passed to Tailappa II of the Chalukyas of Kalyani in 973. Tailappa II placed the Lata country in the hands of his relative and general Barrpa alias Dvarappa Chalukya.

The Portuguese acquired Daman from the Shah of Gujarat. They first noticed the port of Daman in 1523. Daman was a Portuguese enclave for four and a half centuries until the end of colonial rule in 1961. Daman has been a coveted prize, for which princes, monarchs, and alien powers waged wars. Muted memories of history lie vaulted in the monuments of Daman. It had been a melting pot where races and cultures met and mixed to bring forth a multi-coloured identity.

On 3 November 2019, Daman Collector Rakesh Minhas issued a Section 144 order banning the peaceful assembly of four or more persons, slogan-shouting, and the use of loudspeakers across the entire district. Additionally, he ordered the conversion of two high schools into "temporary jails" in response to a land ownership dispute between the local indigenous fishing community and the local administration, who had confiscated their land and bulldozed their homes. The ensuing 2019 Daman Indigenous Land Clearing Protests resulted in the detention of 70 protesters in the 'temporary jails' and another 8 arrests. While a few of the adivasi fisherfolk were rehoused, most were left traumatized and homeless.

== Demographics ==
Historical population
Year	Pop.	±%
1900	17,391	—
1910	18,300	+5.2%
1921	17,566	−4.0%
1931	19,741	+12.4%
1940	23,080	+16.9%
1950	27,473	+19.0%
1960	22,390	−18.5%
1971	38,739	+73.0%
1981	48,560	+25.4%
1991	62,101	+27.9%
2001	113,989	+83.6%
2011	191,173	+67.7%
Source: Census of India

=== Population ===
According to the 2011 census, the Daman district had a population of 191,173, roughly equal to the nation of Samoa, which ranked it 592nd out of 640 districts in India. The district has a population density of 2,655 inhabitants per square kilometre (6,880/sq mi). Its population growth rate over the decade from 2001 to 2011 was 69.256%. The district reported 533 females for every 1,000 males and a literacy rate of 88.06%.

==== Religion ====
Religions in Daman:
1. Hinduism 171,537 (89.7%)
2. Islam 16,087 (8.41%)
3. Christianity 2,618 (1.37%)
4. Jainism 244 (0.13%)
5. Buddhism 216 (0.11%)
6. Sikhism 169 (0.09%)
7. Other Religions 79 (0.04%)
8. Not stated 223 (0.12%)
Source: Census of India

As per 2011 census, Daman has a majority of Hindus with 171,537 people following it (89.7%). Muslims make the second majority of Daman, with 16,087 people following it (8.41%).

== Economy ==
=== Livelihood ===
1. Cultivators (1.70%)
2. Agricultural Labourers (0.50%)
3. Household Industries (0.40%)
4. Other workers (97.4%)
Source: indiacensus.in

There are 105,521 workers in the district, making up 55.2% of the population. Out of 105,521 workers, 102,777 do work in other services, while 422 do work in household industries. 1,794 people do farming while 528 do agricultural labour. The worker participation rate is 55%.

Gender	Total	Main (>6 mo)	Marginal (<6 mo)
Total	105,521	101,717	3,804
Male	94,502	91,955	2,547
Female	11,019	9,762	1,257

^{Source: Census of India}

=== Economy factors ===
The local economy mixes fishing, light manufacturing and tourism. Several industrial units and small factories operate in and around the district, taking advantage of coastal accessibility and connections to nearby Gujarat industrial towns.

== Transport ==
A bridge over the Daman Ganga River between Moti Daman and Nani Daman collapsed during the monsoon on 28 August 2003, killing 27 school children and one teacher when their vehicles plunged into the river. A new bridge was constructed at a cost of about 90 million rupees, but it partially collapsed in August 2004; no casualties occurred in this incident. The collapse was attributed to heavy flooding of the Daman Ganga River.
