= Dadra and Nagar Haveli =

Former union territory in western India

- Union territory
- 1961–2020
- Seal

- Map of Dadra and Nagar Haveli
- Capital: Silvassa
- Area
  - 2011: 491 km^{2} (190 sq mi)
- Population
  - 2011: 343,709
- Government
- Administrator
  - 1961 (first): K. G. Badlani
  - 2016–2020 (last): Praful Khoda Patel
- History
  - Integration with India: 11 August 1961
  - Formation of Dadra and Nagar Haveli and Daman and Diu: 26 January 2020
- Political subdivisions: 1 district
Preceded by	Succeeded by
Free Dadra and Nagar Haveli	Dadra and Nagar Haveli and Daman and Diu

Dadra and Nagar Haveli was a union territory in western India. With an area of 491 km^{2} (190 sq mi), it consisted of two geographically separate enclaves, Dadar and Nagar Haveli, situated between the states of Gujarat and Maharashtra. Silvassa was the capital and principal settlement. The territory was predominantly rural and was known for its large Adivasi population and forested landscape. According to the 2011 census, it had a population of 343,709, a literacy rate of 76.2%, and a sex ratio of 774 females per 1,000 males.

The territories were formerly part of Portuguese India. Dadra was liberated from Portuguese rule in July 1954, while Nagar Haveli was liberated in August 1954. From 1954 until 1961, the territory was administered by the Varishta Panchayat of Free Dadra and Nagar Haveli. On 11 August 1961, the territory was formally integrated into India under the Dadra and Nagar Haveli Act, 1961 and became a union territory.

In December 2019, the Parliament of India passed legislation providing for the merger of Dadra and Nagar Haveli with the neighbouring union territory of Daman and Diu. The merger took effect on 26 January 2020, creating the new union territory of Dadra and Nagar Haveli and Daman and Diu. The former territory subsequently became the Dadra and Nagar Haveli district of the new union territory.

== History ==
Map of Dadra and Nagar Haveli and Daman and Diu, showing its three districts as well as general location within India.

Dadra and Nagar Haveli were small Portuguese possessions surrounded by territory administered by India. Portuguese control began in the late 18th century following an arrangement with the Maratha Empire. The Portuguese subsequently administered the enclaves as part of Portuguese India, with their administration centred on nearby Daman. The Portuguese occupation continued until 1954.

Following Indian independence in 1947, movements seeking the incorporation of the Portuguese enclaves into India became increasingly active. On 22 July 1954, pro-India forces took control of the Portuguese police post at Dadra. The liberation movement subsequently spread to Nagar Haveli, where Portuguese authority collapsed in early August. On 2 August 1954, the Portuguese administration in Nagar Haveli was overthrown and the territory came under the control of the local liberation administration.

From 1954 to 1961, Dadra and Nagar Haveli was effectively self-administered by a local body known as the Varishta Panchayat of Free Dadra and Nagar Haveli. Although administered independently of Portugal, the territory was not formally incorporated into India until 1961.

On 11 June 1961, the Varishta Panchayat passed a resolution supporting integration with India. Parliament subsequently enacted the Dadra and Nagar Haveli Act, 1961, under which the territory became a Union Territory of India on 11 August 1961. The statutory administration consisted of a single district and a single taluka, with Silvassa as its headquarters.

Unlike Goa, Daman and Diu, and other Portuguese possessions in India, Dadra and Nagar Haveli had already been liberated from Portuguese control several years before the Indian annexation of Goa, Daman and Diu in December 1961.

On 26 January 2020, Dadra and Nagar Haveli was merged with Daman and Diu under the Dadra and Nagar Haveli and Daman and Diu (Merger of Union Territories) Act, 2019. The former Union Territory ceased to exist as a separate administrative unit and became one of the three districts of the newly created Union Territory of Dadra and Nagar Haveli and Daman and Diu.

== Geography ==
Dadra and Nagar Haveli covered an area of 491 km^{2} (190 sq mi) and consisted of two enclaves separated by a narrow portion of Gujarat. Dadra is a small enclave surrounded by Gujarat, while the larger Nagar Haveli lies between Gujarat to the north and Maharashtra to the south and east.

The territory lay on the western side of the foothills of the Western Ghats. The Daman Ganga River was the principal river, flowing through the territory before reaching the Arabian Sea at Daman. The landscape included extensive forests, hills, agricultural land and river valleys.

== Demographics ==
Historical population
Year	Pop.	±%
1951	41,532	—
1961	57,963	+39.6%
1971	74,170	+28.0%
1981	103,676	+39.8%
1991	138,477	+33.6%
2001	220,490	+59.2%
2011	343,709	+55.9%
Source: Census of India

According to the 2011 census, Dadra and Nagar Haveli had a population of 343,709. The population density was approximately 700 inhabitants per square kilometre. The territory had a sex ratio of 774 females per 1,000 males and a literacy rate of 76.2%.

The territory experienced exceptionally rapid population growth during the late 20th and early 21st centuries, particularly as industrialisation around Silvassa attracted migrants from neighbouring states. Between 2001 and 2011, the population increased by approximately 55.9%.

A significant proportion of the population belonged to Scheduled Tribes, who accounted for approximately 51.95% of the population according to the 2011 census.

=== Religion ===
Religion in Dadra and Nagar Haveli
Hinduism	93.93%
Islam	3.76%
Christianity	1.49%
Jainism	0.35%
Buddhism	0.18%
Sikhism	0.06%
Others	0.23%

Hinduism was the predominant religion in Dadra and Nagar Haveli according to the 2011 census. Islam and Christianity were the next largest religious groups, while smaller communities included Jainism, Buddhism and Sikhism. The indigenous tribal population traditionally practised a range of religious and cultural traditions alongside Hindu beliefs.

=== Languages ===
The population of Dadra and Nagar Haveli was linguistically diverse. Gujarati, Hindi, Marathi and several Bhili and Konkani varieties were spoken, alongside indigenous languages such as Varli and Dhodia. The official Union Territory administration also identified Gujarati, Marathi, Portuguese, Hindi, Varli and Kokni among the languages spoken in the territory.

The 2011 Census mother-tongue data records numerous indigenous and regional languages, including Bhili/Bhilodi, Dhodia, Kokna, Varli, Gujarati, Marathi, Hindi, Bengali, Odia, Nepali, Tamil, Telugu and Urdu.

Portuguese, the language of the former colonial administration, survived in limited usage after integration with India but declined substantially in comparison with regional Indian languages.

== Administration ==
According to the Constitution of India, Dadra and Nagar Haveli was administered as a Union Territory by an Administrator appointed by the President of India. The territory had no elected legislative assembly.

From 1961 until its merger in 2020, Dadra and Nagar Haveli constituted a single administrative district. Silvassa served as the administrative headquarters and capital.

The final Administrator of the territory was Praful Khoda Patel, who held office from December 2016 until the territory's merger on 26 January 2020.

=== Districts ===
The Union Territory of Dadra and Nagar Haveli had one district:

- Dadra and Nagar Haveli district, an area of 491 km^{2} (190 sq mi). The administrative headquarters and principal settlement was Silvassa.

== See also ==
- Dadra
- Nagar Haveli
- Silvassa
- Free Dadra and Nagar Haveli
- Portuguese India
- Dadra and Nagar Haveli and Daman and Diu
- Dadra and Nagar Haveli and Daman and Diu (Merger of Union Territories) Act, 2019
