= Politics of Chandigarh =

City and union territory in Northern India

Politics of Chandigarh Chandigarh Union Territory of Chandigarh
- Union Territory
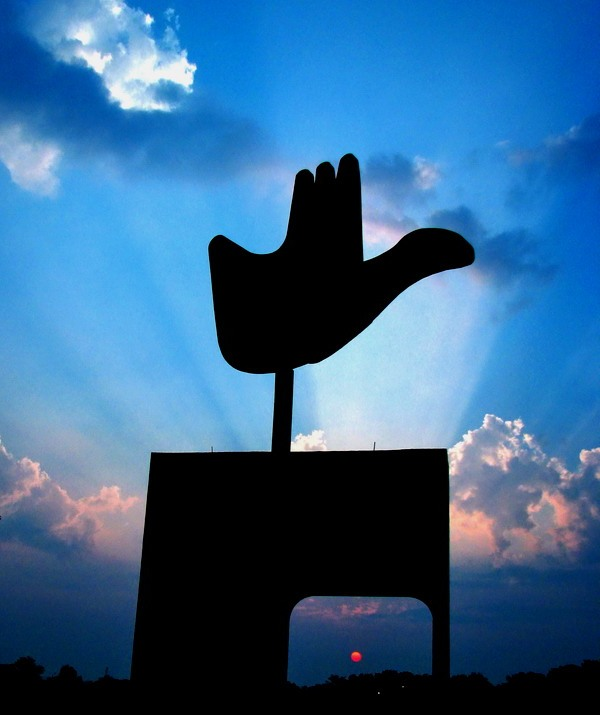
- The Open Hand Monument in Chandigarh
- Nickname: The City Beautiful
- Location within India
- Coordinates: 30.75°N 76.78°E
- Country: India
- Region: Northern India
- Completed: 1960
- Formation: 1 Nov 1966
- Named for: Hindu devi चंडी/चण्डिका Chandi/Chandika

Government
  - Type: Union government (Centre exercises direct control over the Union Territory)
  - Body: Government of India
  - Administrator: Banwarilal Purohit
  - Adviser: Manoj K Parida IAS AGMUT
  - Secretary Home: A K Gupta IAS Hy
  - Secretary Finance: A K Sinha IAS Pb

Area
  - Union Territory: 114 km^{2} (44 sq mi)
  - Rank: 33
- Elevation: 350 m (1,150 ft)

Population (2011)
  - Union Territory: 1,054,686
  - Rank: 29th
  - Density: 9,250/km^{2} (24,000/sq mi)
  - Metro: 960,787

Language
  - Official: English
- Time zone: UTC+5:30 (IST)
- PIN: 160XXX
- Telephone code: +91-172-XXX-XXXX
- ISO 3166 code: IN-CH
- Vehicle registration: CH-01 to CH-04 and PB-01
- HDI: ▲0.792
- HDI Category: high
- Literacy: 81.9
- Website: chandigarh.nic.in
- The city of Chandigarh comprises all of the union territory's area

Chandigarh is a city and a union territory in the northern part of India that serves as the capital of the states of Punjab and Haryana. As a union territory, the city is ruled directly by the Union Government of India and is not part of either state.

The city of Chandigarh was the first planned city in India post-independence in 1947 and is known internationally for its architecture and urban design.

Normally any place in India has representation at 3 levels: National (Parliament), State (Legislative Assembly) & local (Municipality or Panchayat). Chandigarh being a city-state, and a Union Territory does not have a legislative assembly of its own, even though it hosts the legislative assemblies of two states Punjab & Haryana, being a common capital of both states. It has its own Municipal Corporation (MCC), which acts as the local governing authority of Chandigarh. The MCC is one of the most powerful local authorities in India as it serves both as a regional and local authority.

== Legislative Assembly (Before 1966) ==
From 1952 to 1966 (the year Haryana was carved out of Punjab) Chandigarh was the capital of Punjab. Citizens of the city were represented in the state's Legislative Assembly and a Chief Commissioner headed the local administration. While Punjab had remained undivided, Chandigarh, like other large cities of India, fitted into the larger framework of the state administration. When Punjab was divided, both Punjab and Haryana claimed the new city for its capital. Pending resolution of the issue, the Central Government made Chandigarh a Union Territory (under Section 4 of the Punjab Re-organisation Act, 1966, with effect from 1 November 1966) with its administration functioning directly under the Central Government. Under the provisions of this Act, the laws in force in the erstwhile State of Punjab before 1 November 1966, continue to apply to the Union Territory of Chandigarh.

== Administrator (After 1966) ==
Up to 31 May 1984, the Administrator of the UT was designated as "Chief Commissioner". On 1 June 1984, the Governor of Punjab has been functioning as the Administrator of the Union Territory of Chandigarh and Chief Commissioner was redesignated as "Adviser to the Administrator". List of Administrators of Chandigarh is as follows:

List of Administrators of Chandigarh
Name	From	To
Shri B. D. Pande	01.06.1984	03.07.1984
Shri K. T. Satarawala	03.07.1984	14.03.1985
Shri Arjun Singh	14.03.1985	14.11.1985
Shri Hokishe Sema	14.11.1985	26.11.1985
Shri S. D. Sharma	26.11.1985	02.04.1986
Shri S. S. Ray	02.04.1986	08.12.1989
Shri N. N. Mukarji	08.12.1989	14.06.1990
Shri Virendra Verma	14.06.1990	18.12.1990
Gen. O. P. Malhotra	18.12.1990	07.08.1991
Shri Surendra Nath	07.08.1991	09.07.1994
Shri S. P. Kurdukar	10.07.1994	18.09.1994
Lt. Gen. B. K. N. Chhibber	18.09.1994	27.11.1999
Lt. Gen. J. F. R. Jacob	27.11.1999	08.05.2003
Justice O. P. Verma	08.05.2003	03.11.2004
Shri A. R. Kidwai	03.11.2004	16.11.2004
Gen. S. F. Rodrigues	16.11.2004	22.01.2010
Shri Shivraj V. Patil	22.01.2010	22.01.2015
Prof. K. S. Solanki	22.01.2015	22.08.2016
Shri V. P. Singh Badnore	22.08.2016	30.08.2021
Shri Banwarilal Purohit	31.08.2021	30.07.2024
Shri G. C. J. Kataria	31.07.2024	Present

== Parliamentary Constituency ==
Presently the city is represented in Indian Parliament by Manish Tewari of Congress. Before him, Kirron Kher of BJP was MP from Chandigarh.

== Local politics ==
Mrs Raj Bala Malik is the mayor of the city.

List of mayors of Chandigarh
Name	From	To
Smt. Kamla Sharma	23 December 1996	22 December 1997
Sh. Gian Chand Gupta	23 December 1997	22 December 1998
Sh. Kewal Krishan Addiwal	23 December 1998	22 December 1999
Sh. Shanta Hit Abhilashi	23 December 1999	22 December 2000
Sh. Raj Kumar Goyal	23 December 2000	21 July 2001
Sh. Gurcharan Dass (Acting)	22 July 2001	17 August 2001
Smt. Harjinder Kaur	18 August 2001	22 December 2001
Smt. Lalit Joshi	1 January 2002	31 December 2002
Sh. Subhash Chawla	1 January 2003	31 December 2003
Smt. Kamlesh	1 January 2004	31 December 2004
Smt. Anu Chatrath	1 January 2005	31 December 2005
Sh. Surinder Singh	1 January 2006	31 December 2006
Ms. Harjinder Kaur	11 January 2007	31 December 2007
Sh. Pardeep Chhabra	1 January 2008	31 December 2008
Smt. Kamlesh	1 January 2009	31 December 2009
Smt. Anu Chatrath	1 January 2010	31 December 2010
Sh. Ravinder Pal Singh	1 January 2011	31 December 2011
Smt. Raj Bala Malik	1 January 2012	31 December 2012
Sh. Subhash Chawla	1 January 2013	31 December 2013
Sh. Harphool Chander Kalyan	1 January 2014	5 January 2015
Smt. Poonam Sharma	6 January 2015	7 January 2016
Sh. Arun Sood	8 January 2016	31 December 2016
Smt. Asha Kumari Jaswal	12 January 2017	8 January 2018
Sh. Davesh Moudgil	9 January 2018	19 January 2019
Sh. Rajesh Kumar Kalia	19 January 2019	9 January 2020
Raj Bala Malik	10 January 2020	17 January 2023
