= Punjab and Haryana High Court =

High Court for the states of Punjab and Haryana

Coordinates: 30.7573°N 76.8066°E

- Former names: East Punjab High Court (1947–1950); Punjab High Court (1950–1966)

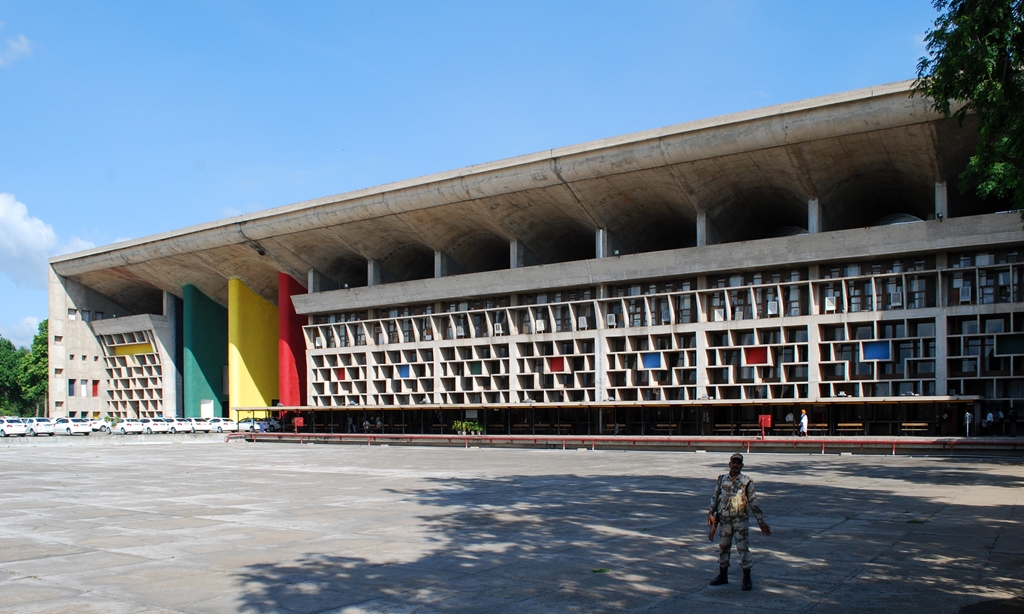
- Facade of the High Court Building
- Interactive map of Punjab and Haryana High Court
- Established: 15 August 1947; 79 years ago
- Jurisdiction: Punjab, Haryana, Chandigarh and Delhi (1947–1966)
- Location: Shimla (1947–1955); Chandigarh (1955–present)
- Composition method: Presidential with confirmation of Supreme Court Collegium including Chief Justice of India on recommendation of High Court Collegium.
- Authorised by: Constitution of India
- Appeals to: Supreme Court of India
- Judge term length: Mandatory retirement at 62 years of age
- Number of positions: 85 (64 Permanent, 21 Additional)
- Website: High Court of Punjab and Haryana

Chief Justice
- Currently: Justice Ashwani Kumar Mishra
- Since: 7 September 2026

Punjab and Haryana High Court is the common High Court for the Indian states of Punjab and Haryana and the Union Territory of Chandigarh based in Chandigarh, India. Sanctioned strength of judges of this High Court is 85, consisting of 64 Permanent Judges, including the Chief Justice, and 21 Additional Judges. As of 21 August 2026, there are 64 Judges working in the High Court, comprising 41 Permanent and 23 Additional Judges.

The court building is known as the Palace of Justice. Designed by Le Corbusier, it and several of his other works were inscribed as UNESCO World Heritage Sites in July 2016. Sarv Mittra Sikri, who had been practising in the High Court of Punjab and Haryana and remained Advocate-General for Punjab from 1 November 1956 to 2 February 1964, was the first to be appointed as judge of the Supreme Court of India on 3 February 1964 directly from the Bar; later, becoming the Chief Justice of India on 22 January 1971, again with the distinction of being first of only two CJIs directly from the Bar.

Past judges include Madan Mohan Punchhi, P. Sathasivam, Tirath Singh Thakur, Jagdish Singh Khehar, Ranjan Gogoi and Surya Kant who were elevated to the Supreme Court of India and became Chief Justice of India.

== History ==
=== Formation ===
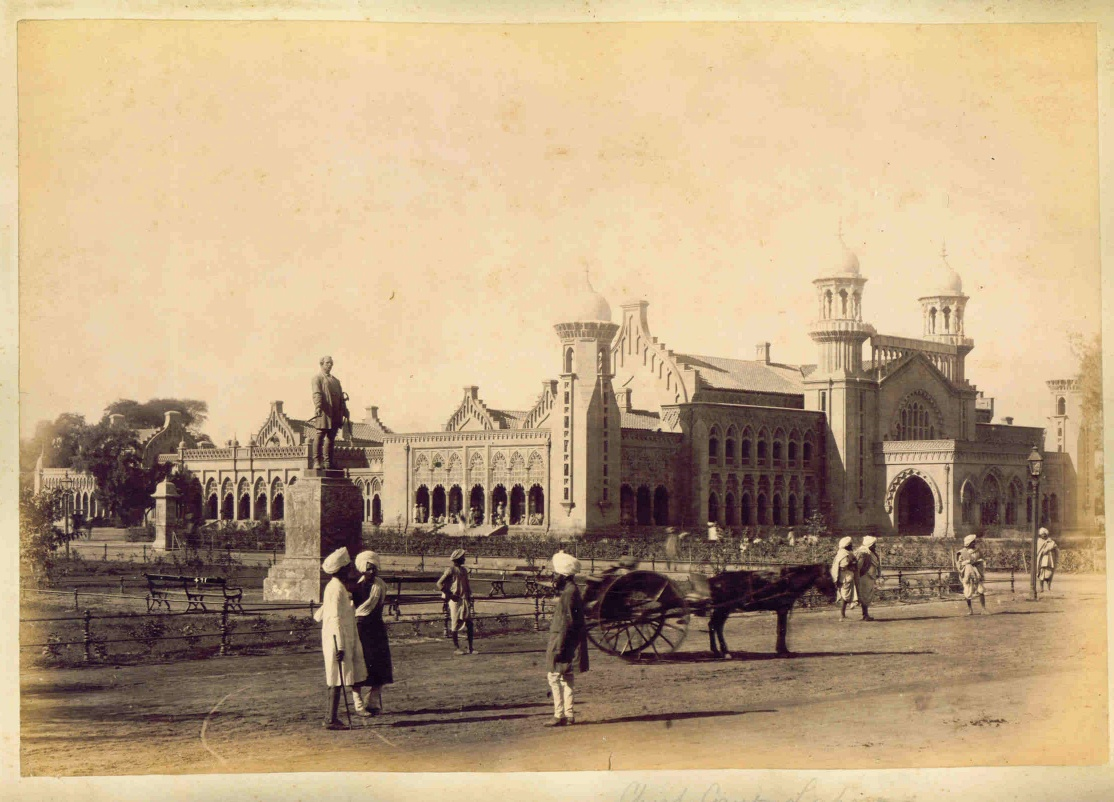
Lahore High Court building, c. 1880s.

Punjab and Haryana High Court was formerly known as Lahore High Court, which was established on 21 March 1919. The jurisdiction of that court covered undivided Punjab and Delhi. From 1920 to 1943, the Court was conferred with extraterritorial jurisdiction over that part of China that formed part of the British consular district of Kashgar, which had previously been under the jurisdiction of the British Supreme Court for China. This ceased upon the ratification of the British-Chinese Treaty for the Relinquishment of Extra-Territorial Rights in China.

=== Independence-induced split ===
Following the independence of India and its Partition at midnight on 14–15 August 1947, a separate High Court of East Punjab was created by the Governor General's High Courts (Punjab) Order, 1947 issued under Section 9 of the Indian Independence Act, 1947, based at historic Peterhoff building in Shimla for the territories as included in the then Province of East Punjab and the then Province of Delhi. This had jurisdiction over the erstwhile territories of Patiala and East Punjab States Union and the East Punjab Province, which now covers areas of Indian Punjab, Delhi, Himachal Pradesh and Haryana. It was at Peterhoff where the trial of Nathuram Godse, who assassinated Mahatma Gandhi, took place in 1948–49.

On introduction of the Constitution of India on 26 January 1950, the State of East Punjab came to be known as the Punjab and accordingly, the name of the High Court was also changed as High Court of Punjab. Simultaneously, Patiala and East Punjab States Union (PEPSU), which was created by uniting eight princely states on 15 July 1948, was also made a Part 'B' State with a separate High Court of Patiala and East Punjab States Union (PEPSU). As per Article 214(2) of the Constitution of India, the High Court was to be continued along with other High Courts.

From 17 January 1955, the Court was moved to its present location in Chandigarh.

By States Reorganisation Act, 1956, Patiala and East Punjab States Union (PEPSU) was merged in the State of Punjab on 1 November 1956. The Judges of the High Court of Patiala and East Punjab States Union (PEPSU) became Judges of the Punjab High Court. The strength of High Court of Punjab, which had originally 8 Judges, rose to 13.

=== Renaming and reduction of jurisdiction ===
The Punjab Reorganisation Act, 1966 paved the way for the formation of Haryana and the Union Territory of Chandigarh from 1 November 1966. Those formations also saw the renaming of the High Court of Punjab as the High Court of Punjab and Haryana. The Judges of the High Court of Punjab became Judges of the common High Court with all the powers and jurisdiction of the High Court of Punjab. However, the principal seat of the High Court remained at Chandigarh. Punjab and Haryana High Court at Chandigarh has original as well as appellate and supervisory jurisdiction over all matters pertaining to Chandigarh (a Union Territory and also capital of Punjab and Haryana), Punjab and Haryana. The High Court of Punjab and Haryana has operated since 1 November 1966 in its present form.

A Circuit Bench of the High Court of Punjab had been working at Delhi since 1952, which was replaced by constituting a separate High Court for the Union Territory of Delhi on 31 October 1966 under the Delhi High Court Act, 1966. Three Judges of the Punjab High Court were transferred to the Delhi High Court, which includes a famous Judge-Hans Raj Khanna.

Following area of State of Punjab namely Shimla, Kangra, Kullu and Lahaul and Spiti Districts; Nalagarh tehsil of Ambala District; Lohara, Amb and Una kanungo circles, some area of Santokhgarh kanungo circle and some other specified area of Una tehsil of Hoshiarpur District besides some parts of Dhar Kalan Kanungo circle of Pathankot tehsil of Gurdaspur District; were merged with Himachal Pradesh on 1 November 1966 as per Section 5 of the Punjab Reorganisation Act, 1966 and thus the jurisdiction of the High Court was reduced.

On 30 April 2022, at a joint meeting of Chief Ministers and Chief Justices of High Courts, Punjab and Haryana proposed the establishment of separate high courts for each state. Chief Minister of Haryana Manohar Lal Khattar proposed a High Court of Haryana in Chandigarh, and Chief Minister of Punjab Bhagwant Mann proposed a High Court of Punjab in New Chandigarh. The Haryana Legislative Assembly had issued resolutions for a separate high court in 2002, 2005, and 2017.

== Chandigarh court building architecture ==
Le Corbusier, who designed the master plan for Chandigarh, was chosen to execute the project of building the high court. India's first Prime Minister, Jawaharlal Nehru, enthusiastically supported the project and took a sustained interest in its execution. When he visited the project on 2 April 1952, he declared "Let this be a new town symbolic of the freedom of India, unfettered by the traditions of the past, an expression of the nation's faith in the future."

== Chief Justice and Judges ==
=== Former Chief Justices ===
- Legends:
  - ACJ – Acting Chief Justice
  - Res – Resigned

List of Chief Justices.

==== List ====
| # | Picture | Chief Justice | Took office | Left office |
| | | Chief Court of the Punjab (1880–1919) | | |
|---|---|---|---|---|
| 1 | | Sir Henry Meredyth Plowden | 1880 | 1895 |
| 2 | | Sir Charles Arthur Roe | 1895 | 1898 |
| 3 | | Sir William Ovens Clark | 1898 | 1909 |
| 4 | | Sir Arthur Hay Stewart Reid | 1909 | 1914 |
| 5 | | Sir Alfred Kensington | 1914 | 1915 |
| 6 | | Sir Donald Campbell Johnstone | 1915 | 1917 |
| 7 | | Sir Henry Adolphus Rattigan | 1917 | 1919 |
| | | Lahore High Court (1920–1947) | | |
| 8 | | Sir Shadi Lal | 1920 | 1934 |
| 9 | | Sir John Douglas Young | 1934 | 1943 |
| 10 | | Sir Arthur Trevor Harries | 1943 | 1946 |
| 11 | | Sir Abdul Rashid | 1946 | 1947 |

==== List ====
Chief Justices of Punjab High Court (1947–1966)
| # | Picture | Name | Tenure | | Oath Administered by |
|---|---|---|---|---|---|
| 12 | | Justice Ram Lall | 15 August 1947 | 18 January 1949 | Chandulal Madhavlal Trivedi |
| 13 | | Justice Sudhi Ranjan Das | 19 January 1949 | 21 January 1950 | Chandulal Madhavlal Trivedi |
| 14 | | Justice Eric Weston | 21 January 1950 | 8 December 1952 | Chandulal Madhavlal Trivedi |
| 15 | | Justice Amar Nath Bandhari | 9 December 1952 | 18 November 1959 | Chandulal Madhavlal Trivedi |
| 16 | | Justice Gopal Das Ghosla | 19 November 1959 | 14 December 1961 | Narhar Vishnu Gadgil |
| 17 | | Justice Donald Falshaw | 15 December 1961 | 29 May 1966 (Res) | Narhar Vishnu Gadgil |
| 18 | | Justice Mehar Singh | 29 May 1966 | continued | Ujjal Singh |
Chief Justices of Punjab and Haryana High Court (1966-till now)
| 18 | | Justice Mehar Singh | continued | 14 August 1970 | – |
| 19 | | Justice Harbans Singh | 15 August 1970 | 8 April 1974 | D. C. Pavate |
| 20 | | Justice Daya Krishan Mahajan | 10 April 1974 | 11 May 1974 | Mahendra Mohan Choudhry |
| 21 | | Justice Ranjit Singh Narula | 11 May 1974 | 31 November 1977 (Res) | Mahendra Mohan Choudhry |
| 22 | | Justice O. Chinnappa Reddy (on appointment of R. S. Narula as acting Governor of Punjab) | 28 June 1976 | 23 October 1976 | Mahendra Mohan Choudhry |
| 23 | | Justice Anand Dev Koshal | 1 November 1977 | 17 July 1978 | Ranjit Singh Narula |
| 24 | | Justice Surjit Singh Sandhawalia | 17 July 1978 | 28 November 1983 | Jaisukh lal Hathi |
| 25 | | Justice Prem Chand Jain | 28 November 1983 | 31 July 1985 | Bhairab Dutt Pande |
| | | Justice Prem Chand Jain | 1 August 1985 | 18 August 1986 | Arjun Singh |
| 26 | | Justice Hariday Nath Seth | 18 August 1986 | 14 October 1987 | Siddhartha Shankar Ray |
| 27 | | Justice Debi Singh Tewatia | 15 October 1987 | 29 October 1987 | Siddhartha Shankar Ray |
| 28 | | Justice R. N. Mittal | 30 October 1987 | 11 November 1987 | Siddhartha Shankar Ray |
| 29 | | Justice Veeraswami Ramaswamy | 12 November 1987 | 6 October 1989 | Siddhartha Shankar Ray |
| 30 | | Justice Shanti Sarup Dewan | 6 October 1989 | 23 October 1989 | Siddhartha Shankar Ray |
| | | Justice Shanti Sarup Dewan | 24 October 1989 | 31 December 1989 | Siddhartha Shankar Ray |
| | | Justice Jitendra Vir Gupta | 1 January 1990 | 8 July 1990 | Nirmal Mukarji |
| 31 | | Justice Jitendra Vir Gupta | 9 July 1990 | 1 May 1991 (Res) | Virendra Verma |
| 32 | | Justice Gokal Chand Mital | 19 May 1991 | 4 August 1991 | Om Prakash Malhotra |
| 33 | | Justice Iqbal Singh Tiwana | 5 August 1991 | 19 September 1991 | Om Prakash Malhotra |
| 34 | | Justice Bipin Chandra Verma | 19 September 1991 | 2 May 1992 | Surendra Nath |
| 35 | | Justice Mandagadde Rama Jois | 3 May 1992 | 31 August 1992 | Surendra Nath |
| 36 | | Justice S. S. Sodhi | 1 September 1992 | 12 November 1992 | Surendra Nath |
| 37 | | Justice Sudarshan Dayal Agarwal | 13 November 1992 | 14 January 1994 | Surendra Nath |
| 38 | | Justice Sudhakar Panditrao Kurdukar | 16 January 1994 | 27 March 1996 | Surendra Nath |
| 39 | | Justice M. S. Liberhan (on appointment of S. P. Kurdukar as acting Governor of Punjab) | 10 July 1994 | 16 August 1994 | Surendra Nath |
| 40 | | Justice R. P. Sethi | 16 August 1994 (on appointment of S. P. Kurdukar as acting Governor of Punjab) | 18 September 1994 | Sudhakar Panditrao Kurdukar |
| 40 | | Justice R. P. Sethi | 27 March 1996 | 27 June 1996 | B. K. N. Chhibber |
| 41 | | Justice M. S. Liberhan | 27 June 1996 | 30 July 1996 | B. K. N. Chhibber |
| 42 | | Justice K. Sreedharan | 30 July 1996 | 18 October 1997 | B. K. N. Chhibber |
| 43 | | Justice Amarjeet Chaudhary | 18 October 1997 | 7 November 1997 | B. K. N. Chhibber |
| 45 | | Justice A. B. Saharya | 7 November 1997 | 14 September 2002 | B. K. N. Chhibber |
| 46 | | Justice G. S. Singhvi | 28 January 2002 | 17 April 2002 | J. F. R. Jacob |
| 46 | | Justice G. S. Singhvi | 5 August 2002 | 11 August 2002 | J. F. R. Jacob |
| 46 | | Justice G. S. Singhvi | 2 September 2002 | 8 September 2002 | J. F. R. Jacob |
| 46 | | Justice G. S. Singhvi | 14 September 2002 | 14 October 2002 | J. F. R. Jacob |
| 47 | | Justice Binod Kumar Roy | 14 October 2002 | 21 February 2005 | J. F. R. Jacob |
| 48 | | Justice G. S. Singhvi | 21 February 2005 | 25 February 2005 | Sunith Francis Rodrigues |
| 49 | | Justice H. S. Bedi | 26 February 2005 | 11 March 2005 | Sunith Francis Rodrigues |
| 50 | | Justice D. K. Jain | 11 March 2005 | 9 April 2006 | Sunith Francis Rodrigues |
| 51 | | Justice H. S. Bedi | 10 April 2006 | 2 October 2006 | Sunith Francis Rodrigues |
| 52 | | Justice S. S. Nijjar | 3 October 2006 | 28 November 2006 | Sunith Francis Rodrigues |
| 53 | | Justice Vijender Jain | 28 November 2006 | 1 August 2008 | Sunith Francis Rodrigues |
| 54 | | Justice Jagdish Singh Khehar | 2 August 2008 | 11 August 2008 | Sunith Francis Rodrigues |
| 55 | | Justice Tirath Singh Thakur | 11 August 2008 | 16 November 2009 | Sunith Francis Rodrigues |
| 56 | | Justice Jagdish Singh Khehar | 17 November 2009 | 29 November 2009 | Sunith Francis Rodrigues |
| 57 | | Justice Mehtab Singh Gill | 29 November 2009 | 5 December 2009 | Sunith Francis Rodrigues |
| 58 | | Justice Mukul Mudgal | 5 December 2009 | 3 January 2011 | Sunith Francis Rodrigues |
| 59 | | Justice Ranjan Gogoi | 4 January 2011 | 11 February 2011 | Shivraj Patil |
| | | Justice Ranjan Gogoi | 12 February 2011 | 22 April 2012 | Shivraj Patil |
| 60 | | Justice Adarsh Kumar Goel (during leave of Ranjan Gogoi) | 2 February 2011 | 11 September 2011 | Shivraj Patil |
| 61 | | Justice M. M. Kumar | 12 September 2011 (during leave of Ranjan Gogoi) | 9 November 2011 | Shivraj Patil |
| 61 | | Justice M. M. Kumar | 23 April 2012 | 8 June 2012 | Shivraj Patil |
| 62 | | Justice Jasbir Singh | 8 June 2012 | 23 September 2012 | Shivraj Patil |
| 63 | | Justice A. K. Sikri | 23 September 2012 | 11 April 2013 | Shivraj Patil |
| 64 | | Justice Jasbir Singh | 12 April 2013 | 31 May 2013 | Shivraj Patil |
| 65 | | Justice Sanjay Kishan Kaul | 1 June 2013 | 25 July 2014 | Shivraj Patil |
| 66 | | Justice Ashutosh Mohunta | 26 July 2014 | 15 December 2014 | Shivraj Patil |
| 67 | | Justice Shiavax Jal Vazifdar | 15 December 2014 | 6 August 2016 | Shivraj Patil |
| | | Justice Shiavax Jal Vazifdar | 7 August 2016 | 3 May 2018 | Kaptan Singh Solanki |
| 68 | | Justice Ajay Kumar Mittal | 4 May 2018 | 2 June 2018 | V. P. Singh Badnore |
| 69 | | Justice Krishna Murari | 2 June 2018 | 22 September 2019 | V. P. Singh Badnore |
| 70 | | Justice Rajiv Sharma | 23 September 2019 | 5 October 2019 | V. P. Singh Badnore |
| 71 | | Justice Ravi Shankar Jha | 6 October 2019 | 13 October 2023 | V. P. Singh Badnore |
| 72 | | Justice Ritu Bahri | 14 October 2023 | 3 February 2024 | Banwarilal Purohit |
| 73 | | Justice Gurmeet Singh Sandhawalia | 4 February 2024 | 8 July 2024 | Banwarilal Purohit |
| 74 | | Justice Sheel Nagu | 9 July 2024 | 1 June 2026 | Banwarilal Purohit |
| 75 | | Justice Ashwani Kumar Mishra | 2 June 2026 | Incumbent | Gulab Chand Kataria |

== Judges elevated as Chief Justices ==
This sections contains list of only those judges elevated as chief justices whose parent high court is Punjab & Haryana. This includes those judges who, at the time of appointment as chief justice, may not be serving in Punjab & Haryana High Court but this list does not include judges who at the time of appointment as chief justice were serving in Punjab & Haryana High Court but does not have Punjab & Haryana as their Parent High Court.

Colour Key

- Female Chief Justice
- Served as Chief Justice of India

Symbol Key

- ^{‡} Elevated to Supreme Court of India
- ^{RES} Resigned
- ^{†} Died in office

| Name | Image | Appointed as CJ in HC of | Date of appointment | | Date of retirement (Note: this includes date of resignation, death and elevation to supreme court) | Tenure | | Ref.. |
| Name | Image | Appointed as CJ in HC of | As Judge | As Chief Justice | Date of retirement | As Chief Justice | As Judge (Note: also includes tenure as Chief Justice) | Ref.. |
|---|---|---|---|---|---|---|---|---|
| Ram Lall | | Punjab & Haryana | 9 February 1938 | 15 August 1947 | 18 January 1949 | 1 year, 157 days | 10 years, 345 days | |
| Amar Nath Bhandari | | Punjab & Haryana | 5 February 1944 | 9 December 1952 | 18 November 1959^{[RES]} | 6 years, 345 days | 15 years, 287 days | |
| Gopal Das Khosla | | Punjab & Haryana | 1 November 1944 | 19 November 1959 | 14 December 1961 | 2 years, 26 days | 17 years, 44 days | |
| Donald Falshaw | | Punjab & Haryana | 26 September 1946 | 15 December 1961 | 29 May 1966^{[RES]} | 4 years, 166 days | 19 years, 246 days | |
| Mehar Singh | | Punjab & Haryana | 24 December 1953 | 30 May 1966 | 14 August 1970 | 4 years, 77 days | 16 years, 234 days | |
| Inder Dev Dua | | Delhi | 11 August 1958 | 17 July 1967 | 31 July 1969^{[‡]} | 2 years, 15 days | 10 years, 355 days | |
| Harbans Singh | | Punjab & Haryana | 11 August 1958 | 15 August 1970 | 8 April 1974 | 3 years, 237 days | 15 years, 241 days | |
| Daya Krishan Mahajan | | Punjab & Haryana | 11 May 1959 | 10 April 1974 | 10 May 1974 | 31 days | 15 years, 0 days | |
| Hans Raj Khanna | | Delhi | 7 May 1962 | 1 August 1969 | 22 September 1971^{[‡]} | 2 years, 53 days | 9 years, 138 days | |
| Ranjit Singh Narula | | Punjab & Haryana | 1 April 1965 | 11 May 1974 | 31 October 1977^{[RES]} | 3 years, 174 days | 12 years, 214 days | |
| Anand Dev Koshal | | Punjab & Haryana | 28 May 1968 | 1 November 1977 | 16 July 1978^{[‡]} | 258 days | 10 years, 50 days | |
| Surjit Singh Sandhawalia | | Punjab & Haryana, transferred to Patna | 28 May 1968 | 17 July 1978 | 27 July 1987 | 9 years, 11 days | 19 years, 61 days | |
| Prem Chand Jain | | Punjab & Haryana, transferred to Karnataka | 24 June 1968 | 1 August 1985 | 16 September 1989 | 4 years, 47 days | 21 years, 85 days | |
| Manmohan Singh Gujral | | Sikkim | 21 August 1969 | 7 May 1976 | 14 March 1983 | 6 years, 312 days | 13 years, 206 days | |
| Debi Singh Tewatia | | Punjab & Haryana, transferred to Calcutta | 6 February 1970 | 15 October 1987 | 2 May 1988^{[RES]} | 201 days | 18 years, 87 days | |
| Shanti Sarup Dewan | | Punjab & Haryana | 14 December 1977 | 24 October 1989 | 31 December 1989 | 69 days | 12 years, 18 days | |
| Jitendra Vir Gupta | | Punjab & Haryana | 19 February 1979 | 9 July 1990 | 1 May 1991^{[RES]} | 297 days | 12 years, 72 days | |
| Sukhdev Singh Kang | | Jammu & Kashmir | 19 February 1979 | 24 October 1989 | 14 May 1993 | 3 years, 203 days | 14 years, 85 days | |
| Gokal Chand Mittal | | Delhi, transferred to Rajasthan | 19 February 1979 | 5 August 1991 | 3 March 1995 | 3 years, 211 days | 16 years, 13 days | |
| Sarvinder Singh Sodhi | | Allahabad | 18 June 1982 | 29 April 1994 | 9 April 1995 | 346 days | 12 years, 296 days | |
| Manmohan Singh Liberhan | | Madras, transferred to Andhra Pradesh | 11 February 1987 | 7 July 1997 | 10 November 2000 | 3 years, 127 days | 13 years, 274 days | |
| Naresh Chandra Jain | | Gauhati | 27 June 1988 | 19 October 2000 | 5 April 2001 | 169 days | 12 years, 283 days | |
| Ravinder Singh Mongia | | Gauhati | 15 June 1990 | 21 September 2001 | 9 June 2002 | 262 days | 11 years, 360 days | |
| Jawahar Lal Gupta | | Kerala | 15 March 1991 | 2 November 2002 | 21 January 2004 | 1 year, 81 days | 12 years, 313 days | |
| Nauvdip Kumar Sodhi | | Kerala, transferred to Karnataka | 15 March 1991 | 6 April 2004 | 29 November 2005 | 1 year, 238 days | 14 years, 260 days | |
| Vinod Kumar Bali | | Kerala | 15 March 1991 | 22 January 2006 | 23 January 2007 | 1 year, 2 days | 15 years, 129 days | |
| Harjit Singh Bedi | | Bombay | 15 March 1991 | 3 October 2006 | 11 January 2007^{[‡]} | 101 days | 15 years, 303 days | |
| Surinder Singh Nijjar | | Calcutta | 8 April 1996 | 7 March 2007 | 16 November 2009^{[‡]} | 2 years, 255 days | 13 years, 223 days | |
| Jagdish Singh Khehar | | Uttarakhand, transferred to Karnataka | 8 February 1999 | 29 November 2009 | 12 September 2011^{[‡]} | 1 year, 288 days | 12 years, 217 days | |
| Adarsh Kumar Goel | | Gauhati, transferred to Orissa | 2 July 2001 | 20 December 2011 | 6 July 2014^{[‡]} | 2 years, 199 days | 13 years, 5 days | |
| Mahesh Mittal Kumar | | Jammu & Kashmir | 2 July 2001 | 9 June 2012 | 4 January 2015 | 2 years, 210 days | 13 years, 187 days | |
| Virender Singh | | Jharkhand | 2 July 2002 | 1 November 2014 | 6 October 2016 | 1 year, 341 days | 14 years, 97 days | |
| Satish Kumar Mittal | | Rajasthan | 2 July 2002 | 5 March 2016 | 14 April 2016 | 41 days | 13 years, 288 days | |
| Hemant Gupta | | Madhya Pradesh | 2 July 2002 | 18 March 2017 | 1 November 2018^{[‡]} | 1 year, 229 days | 16 years, 123 days | |
| Ajay Kumar Mittal | | Meghalaya, transferred to Madhya Pradesh | 9 January 2004 | 28 May 2019 | 29 September 2020 | 1 year, 125 days | 16 years, 265 days | |
| Surya Kant | | Himachal Pradesh | 9 January 2004 | 5 October 2018 | 23 May 2019^{[‡]} | 231 days | 15 years, 134 days | |
| Ajai Lamba | | Gauhati | 22 March 2006 | 7 October 2019 | 20 September 2020 | 350 days | 14 years, 183 days | |
| Rajesh Bindal | | Allahabad | 22 March 2006 | 11 October 2021 | 12 February 2023^{[‡]} | 1 year, 125 days | 16 years, 327 days | |
| Jaswant Singh | | Tripura | 5 December 2007 | 15 February 2023 | 22 February 2023 | 8 days | 15 years, 80 days | |
| Augustine George Masih | | Rajasthan | 10 July 2008 | 30 May 2023 | 8 November 2023^{[‡]} | 163 days | 15 years, 121 days | |
| Ritu Bahri | | Uttarakhand | 16 August 2010 | 4 February 2024 | 10 October 2024 | 250 days | 14 years, 56 days | |
| Gurmeet Singh Sandhawalia | | Himachal Pradesh | 30 September 2011 | 29 December 2024 | Incumbent | 1 year, 324 days | 15 years, 49 days | |
| Arun Palli | | Jammu & Kashmir | 28 December 2013 | 16 April 2025 | 1 June 2026^{[‡]} | 1 year, 47 days | 12 years, 156 days | |
| Lisa Gill | | Andhra Pradesh | 31 March 2014 | 25 April 2026 | Incumbent | 207 days | 12 years, 232 days | |

=== Judges appointed as Acting Chief Justice ===
| Name | Appointed as ACJ in HC of | Date of appointment as Judge | Period as Acting Chief Justice | Date of retirement | Tenure as ACJ | Tenure as Judge | Remarks |
|---|---|---|---|---|---|---|---|
| Prem Chand Jain | Punjab & Haryana | 24 June 1968 | 28 Nov 1983 – 31 Jul 1985 | 16 September 1989 | 1 year, 246 days | 21 years, 85 days | Became permanent |
| R. N. Mittal | Punjab & Haryana | 24 February 1972 | 30 Oct 1987 – 11 Nov 1987 | 6 April 1988 | 13 days | 16 years, 43 days | -- |
| Shanti Sarup Dewan | Punjab & Haryana | 14 December 1977 | 6 Oct 1989 – 23 Oct 1989 | 31 December 1989 | 18 days | 12 years, 18 days | Became permanent |
| Jitendra Vir Gupta | Punjab & Haryana | 19 February 1979 | 1 Jan 1990 – 8 Jul 1990 | 1 May 1991^{[RES]} | 189 days | 12 years, 72 days | Became permanent |
| Gokal Chand Mittal | Punjab & Haryana | 19 February 1979 | 2 May 1991 – 4 Aug 1991 | 3 March 1995 | 95 days | 16 years, 13 days | Elevated as CJ of Delhi |
| Iqbal Singh Tiwana | Punjab & Haryana | 11 June 1979 | 5 Aug 1991 – 19 Sep 1991 | 9 November 1991 | 46 days | 12 years, 152 days | -- |
| Sarvinder Singh Sodhi | Punjab & Haryana | 18 June 1982 | 1 Sep 1992 – 12 Nov 1992 | 9 April 1995 | 73 days | 12 years, 296 days | -- |
| M. S. Liberhan | Punjab & Haryana | 11 February 1987 | 27 Jun 1996 – 30 Jul 1996 | 10 November 2000 | 34 days | 13 years, 274 days | -- |
| Naresh Chand Jain | Gauhati | 27 June 1988 | 30 Jul 1998 – 12 Feb 1999 | 5 April 2001 | 169 days | 12 years, 283 days | -- |
| Amarjeet Chaudhary | Punjab & Haryana | 27 June 1988 | 19 Oct 1997 – 7 Nov 1997 | 4 September 1998 | 202 days | 10 years, 70 days | -- |
| R. S. Mongia | Gauhati | 15 June 1990 | 12 Jun 2001 – 20 Sep 2001 | 9 June 2002 | 101 days | 11 years, 360 days | Became permanent |
| Ashok Bhan | Karnataka | 15 June 1990 | 27 Jun 2000 – 20 Oct 2000 | 16 August 2001^{[‡]} | 116 days | 11 years, 63 days | -- |
| N. K. Sodhi | Kerala | 15 March 1991 | 22 Jan 2004 – 5 Apr 2004 | 29 November 2005 | 75 days | 14 years, 260 days | Became permanent |
| V. K. Jhanji | Jammu & Kashmir | 15 March 1991 | 9 Apr 2002 – 14 May 2002 | 22 March 2006 | 36 days | 15 years, 8 days | -- |
| V. K. Jhanji | Jammu & Kashmir | 15 March 1991 | 5 Mar 2003 – 4 Feb 2004 | 22 March 2006 | 337 days | 15 years, 8 days | -- |
| H. S. Bedi | Punjab & Haryana | 15 March 1991 | 26 Feb 2005 – 11 Mar 2005 | 11 January 2007^{[‡]} | 14 days | 15 years, 303 days | -- |
| H. S. Bedi | Punjab & Haryana | 15 March 1991 | 10 Apr 2006 – 2 Oct 2006 | 11 January 2007^{[‡]} | 193 days | 15 years, 303 days | Elevated as CJ of Bombay |
| S. S. Nijjar | Punjab & Haryana | 8 April 1996 | 3 Oct 2006 – 28 Nov 2006 | 16 November 2009^{[‡]} | 57 days | 13 years, 223 days | -- |
| J. S. Khehar | Punjab & Haryana | 8 February 1999 | 2 Aug 2008 – 10 Aug 2008 | 12 September 2011^{[‡]} | 9 days | 12 years, 217 days | -- |
| J. S. Khehar | Punjab & Haryana | 8 February 1999 | 17 Nov 2009 – 28 Nov 2009 | 12 September 2011^{[‡]} | 12 days | 12 years, 217 days | Elevated as CJ of Uttarakhand |
| Mehtab S. Gill | Punjab & Haryana | 14 May 1999 | 29 Nov 2009 – 5 Dec 2009 | 29 October 2010 | 7 days | 11 years, 169 days | -- |
| A. K. Goel | Gauhati | 2 July 2001 | 15 Nov 2011 – 19 Dec 2011 | 6 July 2014^{[‡]} | 35 days | 13 years, 5 days | Became permanent |
| Ashutosh Mohunta | Punjab & Haryana | 2 July 2001 | 26 Jul 2014 – 15 Dec 2014 | 24 February 2015 | 143 days | 13 years, 238 days | -- |
| M. M. Kumar | Punjab & Haryana | 2 July 2001 | 23 Apr 2012 – 8 Jun 2012 | 4 January 2015 | 47 days | 13 years, 187 days | Elevated as CJ of Jammu & Kashmir |
| Jasbir Singh | Punjab & Haryana | 2 July 2001 | 9 Jun 2012 – 23 Sep 2012 | 31 July 2014 | 107 days | 13 years, 30 days | -- |
| Jasbir Singh | Punjab & Haryana | 2 July 2001 | 12 Apr 2013 – 31 May 2013 | 31 July 2014 | 50 days | 13 years, 30 days | |
| Virender Singh | Jammu & Kashmir | 2 July 2002 | 2 Apr 2012 – 8 Jun 2012 | 6 October 2016 | 68 days | 14 years, 97 days | |
| Hemant Gupta | Patna | 2 July 2002 | 29 Oct 2016 – 14 Mar 2017 | 1 November 2018^{[‡]} | 137 days | 16 years, 123 days | Elevated as CJ of Madhya Pradesh |
| A. K. Mittal | Punjab & Haryana | 9 January 2004 | 4 May 2018 – 2 Jun 2018 | 29 September 2020 | 30 days | 16 years, 265 days | |
| Rajesh Bindal | Jammu & Kashmir | 22 March 2006 | 9 Dec 2020 – 3 Jan 2021 | 12 February 2023^{[‡]} | 26 days | 16 years, 327 days | Transferred to Calcutta |
| Rajesh Bindal | Calcutta | 22 March 2006 | 28 Apr 2021 – 10 Oct 2021 | 12 February 2023^{[‡]} | 166 days | 16 years, 327 days | Elevated as CJ of Allahabad |
| Sabina | Himachal Pradesh | 12 March 2008 | 25 May 2022 – 22 Jun 2022 | 19 April 2023 | 29 days | 15 years, 39 days | -- |
| Sabina | Himachal Pradesh | 12 March 2008 | 21 Jan 2023 – 19 Apr 2023 | 19 April 2023 | 89 days | 15 years, 39 days | Retired as ACJ |
| Ritu Bahri | Punjab & Haryana | 16 August 2010 | 14 Oct 2023 – 3 Feb 2024 | 10 October 2024 | 112 days | 14 years, 56 days | Elevated as CJ of Uttarakhand |
| G. S. Sandhawalia | Punjab & Haryana | 30 September 2011 | 4 Feb 2024 – 8 Jul 2024 | Incumbent | 156 days | 15 years, 49 days | -- |

== Judges elevated to Supreme Court ==
This section includes the list of only those judges whose parent high court was Punjab & Haryana. This includes those judges who, at the time of elevation to Supreme Court of India, may not be serving in Punjab & Haryana High Court but this list does not include judges who at the time of elevation were serving in Punjab & Haryana High Court but does not have Punjab & Haryna as their Parent High Court.

Colour Key

- Female Judge
- Served as Chief Justice of India

Symbol Key

- ^{RES} Resigned
- ^{†} Died in office

| # | Name of the Judge | Image | Date of Appointment | | Date of Retirement | Tenure | | | Immediately preceding office |
| # | Name of the Judge | Image | In Parent High Court | In Supreme Court | Date of Retirement | In High Court(s) | In Supreme Court | Total tenure (Note: Includes both tenure as High Court Judge as well as Supreme Court Judge) | Immediately preceding office |
|---|---|---|---|---|---|---|---|---|---|
| 1 | Jeevan Lal Kapur | | 6 June 1949 | 14 January 1957 | 12 December 1962 | 7 years, 222 days | 5 years, 333 days | 13 years, 190 days | Judge of Punjab & Haryana HC |
| 2 | Amar Nath Grover | | 10 October 1957 | 11 February 1968 | 31 May 1973^{[RES]} | 10 years, 124 days | 5 years, 110 days | 15 years, 234 days | Judge of Punjab & Haryana HC |
| 3 | Inder Dev Dua | | 11 August 1958 | 1 August 1969 | 3 October 1972 | 10 years, 355 days | 3 years, 64 days | 14 years, 54 days | 2nd CJ of Delhi HC |
| 4 | Hans Raj Khanna | | 7 May 1962 | 22 September 1971 | 11 March 1977^{[RES]} | 9 years, 138 days | 5 years, 171 days | 14 years, 309 days | 3rd CJ of Delhi HC |
| 5 | Ranjit Singh Sarkaria | | 12 June 1967 | 17 September 1973 | 15 January 1981 | 6 years, 97 days | 7 years, 121 days | 13 years, 218 days | Judge of Punjab & Haryana HC |
| 6 | Anand Dev Koshal | | 28 May 1968 | 17 July 1978 | 6 March 1982 | 10 years, 50 days | 3 years, 233 days | 13 years, 283 days | 11th CJ of Punjab & Haryana HC |
| 7 | Madan Mohan Punchhi | | 24 October 1979 | 6 October 1989 | 9 October 1998 | 9 years, 347 days | 9 years, 4 days | 18 years, 351 days | Judge of Punjab & Haryana HC |
| 8 | Ashok Bhan | | 15 June 1990 | 17 August 2001 | 2 October 2008 | 11 years, 63 days | 7 years, 108 days | 18 years, 110 days | Judge of Karnataka HC |
| 9 | Harjit Singh Bedi | | 15 March 1991 | 12 January 2007 | 4 September 2011 | 15 years, 303 days | 4 years, 236 days | 20 years, 174 days | 36th CJ of Bombay HC |
| 10 | Surinder Singh Nijjar | | 8 April 1996 | 17 November 2009 | 6 June 2014 | 13 years, 223 days | 4 years, 202 days | 18 years, 60 days | 33rd CJ of Calcutta HC |
| 11 | Jagdish Singh Khehar | | 8 February 1999 | 13 September 2011 | 27 August 2017 | 12 years, 217 days | 5 years, 349 days | 18 years, 201 days | 25th CJ of Karnataka HC |
| 12 | Adarsh Kumar Goel | | 2 July 2001 | 7 July 2014 | 6 July 2018 | 13 years, 5 days | 4 years, 0 days | 17 years, 5 days | 26th CJ of Orissa HC |
| 13 | Hemant Gupta | | 2 July 2002 | 2 November 2018 | 16 October 2022 | 16 years, 123 days | 3 years, 349 days | 20 years, 107 days | 23rd CJ of Madhya Pradesh HC |
| 14 | Surya Kant | | 9 January 2004 | 24 May 2019 | Incumbent | 15 years, 135 days | 7 years, 178 days | 22 years, 313 days | 23rd CJ of Himachal Pradesh HC |
| 15 | Rajesh Bindal | | 22 March 2006 | 13 February 2023 | 15 April 2026 | 16 years, 328 days | 3 years, 62 days | 20 years, 25 days | 49th CJ of Allahabad HC |
| 16 | Augustine George Masih | | 10 July 2008 | 9 November 2023 | Incumbent | 15 years, 122 days | 3 years, 9 days | 18 years, 131 days | 41st CJ of Rajasthan HC |
| 17 | Arun Palli | | 28 December 2013 | 2 June 2026 | Incumbent | 12 years, 156 days | 169 days | 12 years, 325 days | 38th CJ of Jammu & Kashmir |

== Digitization ==
Punjab and Haryana high court is high court where entire record of the decision and pending cases have been digitized. Digitized record paved way for many unique applications such as

1. Issuance of certified copies directly from digitized records depository as it is digitally signed.
2. Availability of records of decided and pending cases for court reference in soft form.
3. Facility of inspection of case files in soft copy from DMS(e- inspection).
4. To provide paper books to the all e-diary account holders.
5. Use of digitized records for the issuance of e- notices by the court.
6. Any hard copy of a paper book, if lost, can be reconstructed without any loss of time, if required.

The figures of the work done are as under:

| Digitization Statistics: | Figures |
|---|---|
| Judicial files pages scanned | 14.71 crores |
| paper books scanned | 26.25 lakhs |
| orders scanned | 59.64 lakhs |
| Old copy petitions pages scanned | 10.38 lakhs |
| Pages of administration files scanned | 1.21 crores |

=== Virtual private network ===
VPN connection has been provided to honourable judges of high court for accessing DMS for scanned paper books from their camp office or from any other place.

=== e- diary ===
e-diary is a feature whereby account holders can manage their own case portfolio and view the cases filed or represented by them. Online status of the case along with interim and final orders/ judgments were made available through e-diary. All identified cases of different departments such as Income tax department, Insurance company, Union of India, Advocates General of Punjab and Haryana are automatically pushed in their online e-diary accounts. In addition to the e-diary system, the state governments are in develop court cases monitoring system(CCMS) through which they will monitor pending cases in the Supreme court of India.

=== e- filing ===
Online web based e- filing module is functional for filing cases 24 X 7.e- filed cases expedite issuance of copies of orders, summons and is a step towards paperless court regime. It is made compulsory to file cases on online.

=== Personal information system ===
In the house, the software has been developed, which contains personal profile and service record of the judicial officer. Access to relevant information has been given at different levels such as Administrative judge, registrar general, registrar vigilance, district judge and the officer concerned.

=== Updating information of case after final decision ===
Decided cases are available on the website of the high court. On many occasions, the final order is reviewed/ modified or challenged by filing into court appeal. Status subsequent to final disposal of the matter is shown and when print out of final order is taken from the website. The printout carries a message showing the up-to-date status of the case.

== Precedence setting cases ==
In a case of cow-smuggling, the Punjab and Haryana High Court while treating animals as the "legal person" mandated that "entire animal kingdom including avian and aquatic" species has a "distinct legal persona with corresponding rights, duties, and liabilities of a living person" and humans are "loco parentis" while laying out the norms for animal welfare, veterinary treatment, fodder and shelter, e.g. animal drawn carriages must not have more than four humans, and load carrying animals must not be loaded beyond the specified limits and those limits must be halved when animals have to carry the load up a slope.

== See also ==
- List of World Heritage Sites in India
