= Meerut College =

College located in Meerut, India

Coordinates: 28.9933°N 77.7148°E

- Motto in English: Arise, Awake
- Type: State-funded
- Established: 1892
- Affiliations: Chaudhary Charan Singh University
- President: Mr. Suresh Jain Rituraj
- Principal: Dr. S.N. SHARMA
- Students: 10,000+
- Location: Western Kutchery Rd, near Commissioner Office, Lalkurti Bazaar, Meerut Cantt, Meerut, Uttar Pradesh 250003, (India) Meerut, Uttar Pradesh, 250003, India
- Campus: Urban
- Colors: Martyr's Red
- Nickname: MCM
- Website: https://www.meerutcollege.edu.in/ http://www.meerutcollege.org/

Meerut College is a state-funded college in Meerut, Uttar Pradesh, India. The college is affiliated to Chaudhary Charan Singh University, Meerut. The college was established in 1892 and has a campus of 50 acres (0.20 km^{2}).

== Academics ==
The college offers undergraduate and postgraduate courses in science, arts, commerce, education, computer science and law in affiliation to Chaudhary Charan Singh University. The college also offers PhD. courses in the same fields. The college provides a master's degree in journalism and mass communication in affiliation to Chaudhary Charan Singh University. The college also offers an MBA in affiliation to Mahamaya Technical University, Gautam Buddha Nagar.

The college is a study center for Indira Gandhi National Open University offering bachelors, masters and diploma courses.

The college also offers separate hostel facilities to its male and female students. It also has several practical labs, and educational complexes.

== Fee structure ==
It is a state funded college so the fee is minimal and meritious students also get scholarships.

== National Cadet Corps ==
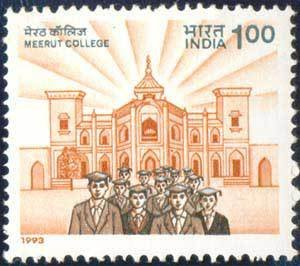
Indian Postage stamp of Meerut College, 1993

It has 70 UP BN NCC & 2 UP ARM SQ and total 208 cadets (SD &SW) are enrolled in NCC.

=== 70 UP BN NCC (Total Strength - 104) ===
ANO - Dr.(Capt.) Awdhesh Kumar

=== 2 UP ARM SQ (Total Strength - 104) ===
ANO - Dr.(Maj.) Paramjeet Singh

== Notable alumni ==
- Chaudhary Charan Singh- Former Prime Minister of India
- Kunwar Mahmud Ali Khan- Former Governor Madhya Pradesh
- Murli Manohar Joshi - Former Union Human Resource Development Minister of India
- Jagmohanlal Sinha - Indian Judge whose decision in State of Uttar Pradesh v. Raj Narain led to the declaration of emergency
- Akhtar Hameed Khan - Pakistani Development and Social Activist
- Prof. K. A. Nizami Indian ambassador to Syria (1975-1977).
- Shantanu Bhardwaj - Lawyer and Cricketer
- Kushal Pal Singh - Chairman and CEO of DLF Limited
- Jameel Jalibi - Former Vice-Chancellor of Karachi University
- Virendra Verma - Former Governor of Punjab, Administrator of Chandigarh and Governor of Himachal Pradesh
- Virendra Singh, theoretical physicist and Shanti Swarup Bhatnagar laureate
- Intizar Hussain (1925-2016), leading literary figure from Pakistan. Author of Basti and Naya Gar
- S. Irfan Habib, noted historian
- Amrish Tyagi - Founder and CEO at Webindia Master
- Veerendra Verma– Ex Governor, Punjab & Himachal Pradesh
- Kunwar Mahmood Ali– Ex Governor, Madhya Pradesh
- Shashank – Ex. Foreign Secretary, Minister of external affairs, New delhi
- G.N. Mehta- Ex Chief Secretary, U.P & Ambassador of Canada.
- Dr. Z. H. Zaidi– Former Vice Chancellor, Rohilkhand University, Bareilly
- Dr. S.H. Sonch- Ex-Vice Chancellor, GNDU Amritsar
- Dr. Veerendra Singh – Director – TIFT, Mumbai
- Dr. T.C. Goel – Director – BITS, Goa
