= Ashutosh Mohunta =

Indian judge (1953–2020)

Member of Punjab State Human Rights Commission
- In office 23 September 2016 – 22 September 2020

Chief Justice of Punjab and Haryana High Court
- In office 26 July 2014 – 15 December 2014 (Acting)
- Preceded by: Sanjay Kishan Kaul
- Succeeded by: Shiavax Jal Vazifdar

Personal details
- Born: Ashutosh Mohunta; 25 February 1953; Sirsa, East Punjab, India (now in Haryana, India)
- Died: 22 September 2020 (aged 67); Mohali, Punjab, India

Ashutosh Mohunta (25 February 1953 – 22 September 2020) was an Indian judge. He was Acting Chief Justice of Punjab and Haryana High Court in 2014. He was a judge of the Punjab and Haryana High Court from 2001 to 2010, and again from 2014 until 2015. Mohunta served on the Andhra Pradesh High Court from 2010 to 2014. He was Member of Punjab State Human Rights Commission from 2016 until his death.

== Career ==
Mohunta was born on 25 February 1953, in Sirsa, East Punjab, India (now in Haryana, India). He completed his early education from Mayo College, Ajmer an exclusive and historic boarding school often referred to as the 'Eton of the East' known for educating royalty, nobility, and some of India’s most distinguished families. Later in 1976, he obtained his Bachelor of Laws degree from the University of Delhi. He enrolled as advocate in 1977 in the Punjab and Haryana High Court and started practicing under his father Sushil Chand Mohunta, who at that point was the Advocate General of Haryana.

Mohunta became judge of the Punjab and Haryana High Court on 2 July 2001. He transferred to Andhra Pradesh High Court and assumed charge on 28 October 2010. He returned to the Punjab and Haryana High Court for health reasons on 26 June 2014. He took over as Acting Chief Justice of the Punjab and Haryana High Court on 26 July 2014 and remained in this position until 15 December 2014. He retired on 24 February 2015.

On 23 September 2016 he was appointed Member of Punjab State Human Rights Commission.

== Death ==
Mohunta died on 22 September 2020, due to COVID-19 during the COVID-19 pandemic in India at a hospital in Mohali.
