= Rajbir Sherawat =

Indian judge (born 1962)

Rajbir Sherawat (born 31 October 1962) has been a judge of the Punjab and Haryana High Court in India since 10 July 2017.
