= Ram Lall =

1st Chief Justice of Punjab & Haryana High Court

Justice Dewan Ram Lal

1st Chief Justice of East Punjab High Court
- In office 15 August 1947 – 18 January 1949
- Appointed by: Lord Mountbatten
- Preceded by: Office established
- Succeeded by: Sudhi Ranjan Das

Judge of Lahore High Court
- In office 9 February 1938 – 14 August 1947
- Appointed by: George VI

Personal details
- Born: Punjab, British India
- Education: Government College, Lahore
- Profession: Judge

Ram Lall or Dewan Ram Lall was an Indian jurist and the first Indian Chief Justice of the East Punjab High Court, which emerged after the Partition of India in 1947. This erstwhile East Punjab High Court is now known as Punjab and Haryana High Court.

== Early life and education ==
Lall was born in the Punjab Province of British India. He completed his education in Lahore, graduating from Government College, Lahore, and subsequently qualified for the Bar at the Middle Temple in London. After returning to India, he began practising law at Lahore. He rose rapidly in the legal profession, serving as Government Advocate from 1933 and becoming Advocate-General of Punjab in 1937. On 9 February 1938, he was elevated to the Bench of the Lahore High Court. The Partition of India in 1947 brought about the division of the jurisdiction of the Lahore High Court. Lall was designated Chief Justice of the newly established East Punjab High Court. He assumed office on 15 August 1947, with the Court initially functioning from Shimla. He thus became the first Indian Chief Justice of the post-Partition East Punjab High Court.

Lall was considered for elevation to Federal Court of India with support of Jawaharlal Nehru, but Home Minister Vallabhbhai Patel and Chief Justice of India H. J. Kania preferred Mehr Chand Mahajan over Lall and subsequently Mahajan was appointed to Federal Court which later turned into Supreme Court of India in 1950. Mahajan also became the third Chief Justice of India in 1954.
