= Krishna Murari =

Indian judge (born 1958)

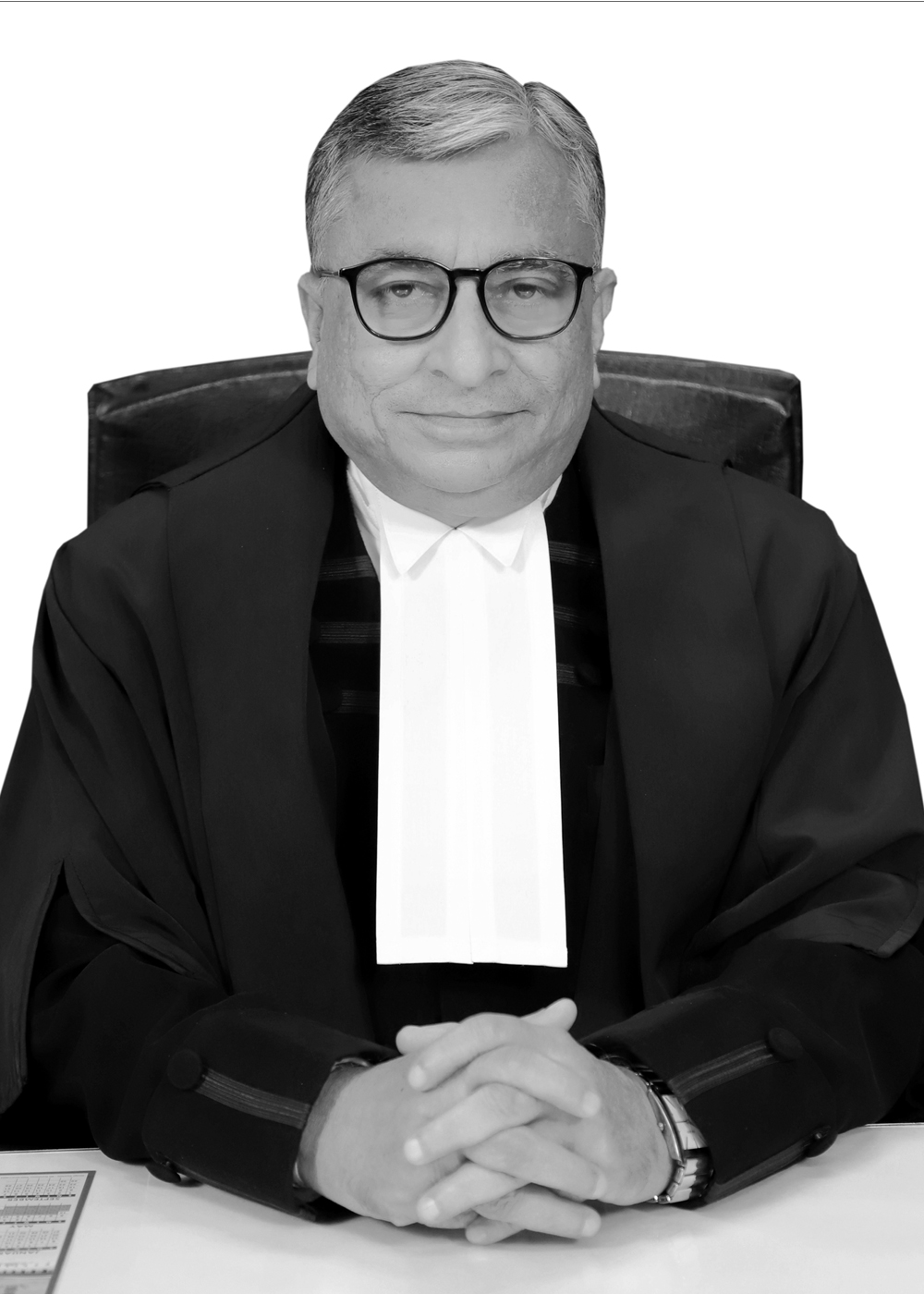

Judge of the Supreme Court of India
- In office 23 September 2019 – 8 July 2023
- Nominated by: Ranjan Gogoi
- Appointed by: Ram Nath Kovind

Chief Justice of the Punjab and Haryana High Court
- In office 2 June 2018 – 22 September 2019
- Nominated by: Dipak Misra
- Appointed by: Ram Nath Kovind
- Preceded by: Ajay Kumar Mittal (acting)

Judge of the Allahabad High Court
- In office 7 January 2004 – 1 June 2018
- Nominated by: V. N. Khare
- Appointed by: A. P. J. Abdul Kalam

Personal details
- Born: 9 July 1958 (age 68) Allahabad, Uttar Pradesh

Krishna Murari (born 9 July 1958) is a retired judge of the Supreme Court of India and former chief justice of the Punjab and Haryana High Court. He also served as a judge of the Allahabad High Court till his elevation as chief justice of the Punjab and Haryana High Court.

== Career ==
Murari was born in a lawyer family of Uttar Pradesh. His uncles G.N. Verma and R.N. Verma were senior advocates. Murari passed Bachelor of Laws from the Allahabad University, Prayagraj. He was enrolled as an advocate on 23 December 1981 and started practice in the Allahabad High Court on civil, constitutional, company and revenue matters. In his 22 years law career, he served as standing counsel of Uttar Pradesh State Yarn Company, Northern Railway Primary Co-operative Bank, Uttar Pradesh State Textile Corporation etc. He also appeared for Bundelkhand University of Jhansi. Murari was appointed an additional judge of the Allahabad High Court on 7 January 2004 and became the permanent judge in 2005. On 2 June 2018 he was elevated in the post of the chief justice of Punjab and Haryana High Court in Chandigarh after the retirement of Justice Shiavax Jal Vazifdar. He was elevated as judge of Supreme Court of India on 23 September 2019. He retired from the Supreme Court on 8 July 2023.

Over the course of his Supreme Court tenure, Murari authored 64 judgments.
