= Sudhakar Panditrao Kurdukar =

Indian judge (born 1935)

Governor of Punjab Administrator of Chandigarh
- In office 10 July 1994 – 18 September 1994
- Preceded by: Surendra Nath
- Succeeded by: B. K. N. Chhibber

Personal details
- Born: 16 January 1935 (age 91) Ambajogai Dist.Beed Maharashtra

Sudhakar Panditrao Kurdukar (born 16 January 1935) is a former chief justice of the Punjab & Haryana High Court in January 1994. Later he became a judge of the Supreme Court of India in March 1996 and retired in January 2000. He was earlier a judge in the Bombay High Court. He was acting Governor of Punjab from July to September 1994.

== See also ==
- List of governors of Punjab (India)
