= Eric Weston =

British civil servant and judge

Sir Eric Weston

3rd Chief Justice of Punjab & Haryana High Court
- In office 21 January 1950 – 8 December 1952
- Appointed by: C. Rajagopalachari
- Preceded by: Sudhi Ranjan Das
- Succeeded by: Amar Nath Bhandari

Judge of Bombay High Court
- In office 14 January 1943 – 20 January 1950
- Appointed by: George VI

Personal details
- Born: 8 December 1892 South Shields, County Durham
- Died: 20 October 1976 (aged 83)
- Education: B.A. in Mathematics
- Alma mater: South Shields High School, St. John's College, Cambridge Cambridge University

Sir Eric Weston (8 December 1892 – 20 October 1976) was a British civil servant and judge. He was an Indian Civil Service officer. He was the third Chief Justice of the Punjab and Haryana High Court.

== Biography ==
Weston was born in South Shields, County Durham. He attended South Shields High School and St John's College, Cambridge, receiving a B.A. in mathematics from Cambridge University in 1914. He then went on to join the Indian Civil Service, completing the entrance exam in 1915.

He is chiefly notable for being the very first british Chief Justice of the Punjab and Haryana High Court. He served as a judge of Bombay High Court from 14 January 1943 to 20 January 1950. From 21 January 1950, he was the third Chief Justice of the Punjab High Court till to 8 December 1952, when he retired. He was knighted in 1954.
