= Donald Falshaw =

British-Indian civil servant and judge

Sir Donald James Falshaw
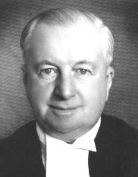

6th Chief Justice of Punjab High Court
- In office 15 December 1961 – 29 May 1966
- Appointed by: Rajendra Prasad
- Preceded by: Gopal Das Khosla
- Succeeded by: Mehar Singh

Judge of Punjab High Court
- In office 15 August 1947 – 14 December 1961
- Appointed by: Lord Mountbatten

Judge of Lahore High Court
- In office 26 September 1946 – 14 August 1947
- Appointed by: George VI

Personal details
- Born: 22 January 1905 Morecambe, Lancashire
- Died: 1984 (aged 78–79)
- Education: Sidney Sussex College, Cambridge
- Occupation: Judge
- Profession: Chief Justice

Sir Donald James Falshaw (22 January 1905 – 1984) was a British administrator and judge in India. A member of the Indian Civil Service, he continued his career in India after its independence in 1947, eventually becoming the first Chief Justice of the Punjab High Court in 1966 when it was renamed as Punjab and Haryana High Court.

He was the very last British judge who did not become an Indian citizen to serve in India.

== Biography ==
Falshaw was born in Morecambe, Lancashire. He was educated at Lancaster Royal Grammar School and Sidney Sussex College, Cambridge. He joined the Indian Civil Service in 1928. He became the first Chief Justice of the Punjab High Court in 1966.

On 15 May 1966, he became the last British judge to have served in India as the same day he sailed for the United Kingdom and resigned from his post as chief justice of Punjab & Haryana High Court.

Falshaw was knighted in 1967.
