= List of administrators of Chandigarh =

Both head of state & government

Administrator of Chandigarh
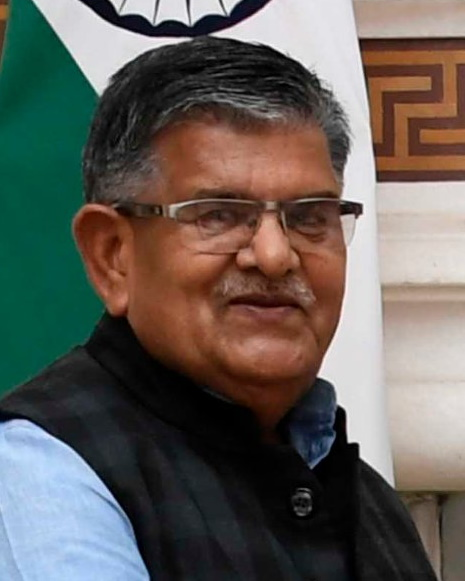
- Incumbent; Gulab Chand Kataria since 31 July 2024
- Style: His Excellency
- Reports to: President of India
- Residence: Lok Bhavan, Chandigarh
- Appointer: President of India on the advice of Union Council of Ministers
- Term length: Five Years
- Constituting instrument: Article 239 of the Constitution
- Inaugural holder: Bhairab Dutt Pandey
- Formation: 1 June 1984; 42 years ago
- Website: http://chandigarh.gov.in/

The Administrator of Chandigarh is appointed by the President of India under article 239 of the Constitution of India.

Since 1984, the Governor of Punjab has acted as the administrator of Chandigarh. The official residence is Lok Bhavan, Punjab in Chandigarh.

== Predecessor ==
=== Chief commissioners ===
| # | Name | Portrait | Took office | Left office | Duration |
|---|---|---|---|---|---|
| 1 | Mohinder Singh Randhawa | | 1 November 1966 | 31 October 1968 | |
| 2 | Damodar Das | | 31 October 1968 | 8 April 1969 | |
| 3 | B. P. Bagchi | | 8 April 1969 | 1 September 1972 | |
| 4 | Mohan Prakash Mathur | | 1 September 1972 | December 1975 | |
| 5 | G. P. Gupta | | December 1975 | 15 June 1976 | |
| 6 | T. N. Chaturvedi | | 15 June 1976 | June 1978 | |
| 7 | J. C. Agrawal | | June 1978 | 19 July 1980 | |
| 8 | B. S. Sarao | | 19 July 1980 | 8 March 1982 | |
| 9 | Krishna Banerjee | | 8 March 1982 | 31 May 1984 | |

== Administrators of Chandigarh (1984-present) ==
| # | Portrait | Name (born – died) | Took office | Left office | Duration |
|---|---|---|---|---|---|
| 1 | | Bhairab Dutt Pande (1917–2009) | 1 June 1984 | 2 July 1984 | 32 days |
| 2 | | Kershasp Tehmurasp Satarawala (1916–2001) | 3 July 1984 | 14 March 1985 | 245 days |
| 3 | | Arjun Singh (1930–2011) | 14 March 1985 | 14 November 1985 | 246 days |
| 4 | | Hokishe Sema (Additional charge) (1921–2007) | 14 November 1985 | 26 November 1985 | 13 days |
| 5 | | Shankar Dayal Sharma (1918–1999) | 26 November 1985 | 2 April 1986 | 128 days |
| 6 | | Siddharta Shankar Ray (1920–2010) | 2 April 1986 | 8 December 1989 | 3 years, 251 days |
| 7 | | Nirmal Kumar Mukarji (1921–2002) | 8 December 1989 | 14 June 1990 | 189 days |
| 8 | | Virendra Verma (1916–2009) | 14 June 1990 | 18 December 1990 | 187 days |
| 9 | | Om Prakash Malhotra (1922–2015) | 18 December 1990 | 7 August 1991 | 232 days |
| 10 | | Surendra Nath (1926–1994) | 7 August 1991 | 9 July 1994 | 2 years, 336 days |
| 11 | | Sudhakar Panditrao Kurdukar (b.1935) (Additional charge) | 10 July 1994 | 18 September 1994 | 70 days |
| 12 | | B. K. N. Chhibber (b.1936) | 18 September 1994 | 27 November 1999 | 5 years, 70 days |
| 13 | | J. F. R. Jacob (1921–2016) | 27 November 1999 | 8 May 2003 | 3 years, 162 days |
| 14 | | Om Prakash Verma (1937–2015) | 8 May 2003 | 3 November 2004 | 1 year, 179 days |
| 15 | | Akhlaqur Rahman Kidwai (Additional charge) (1921–2016) | 3 November 2004 | 16 November 2004 | 13 days |
| 16 | | Sunith Francis Rodrigues (1933–2022) | 16 November 2004 | 22 January 2010 | 5 years, 67 days |
| 17 | | Shivraj Patil (1935–2025) | 22 January 2010 | 21 January 2015 | 5 years, 0 days |
| 18 | | Kaptan Singh Solanki (Additional charge) (b.1939) | 21 January 2015 | 22 August 2016 | 1 year, 214 days |
| 19 | | V. P. Singh Badnore (b.1948) | 22 August 2016 | 30 August 2021 | 5 years, 9 days |
| 20 | | Banwarilal Purohit (Additional charge until 11 September 2021) (b.1940) | 31 August 2021 | 30 July 2024 | 2 years, 334 days |
| 21 | | Gulab Chand Kataria (b.1944) | 31 July 2024 | Incumbent | 2 years, 72 days |

== Oath ==
“I, A. B., do swear in the name of God/solemly affirm that I will faithfully execute the office of Administrator (or discharge the functions of the Administrator) of .............(name of the Union Territory) and will to the best of my ability preserve, protect and defend the Constitution and the law and that I will devote myself to the service and well-being of the people of ..………(name of the Union Territory).”Main, [Name], Ishwar ki shapath leta hoon (ya nishtha se pratigya karta hoon) ki main sachhe mann se Governor (Rajyapal) ke roop mein [State Name] ke pad ka karyabhar sambhalunga (ya zimmedari uthaunga). Main apni poori kabiliyat se Samvidhan (Constitution) aur kanoon (Law) ki raksha, suraksha aur bachaav karunga, aur main apne aap ko [State Name] ki janta ki seva aur kalyan (well-being) mein samarpit karunga."

== See also ==
- Governors in India
