= List of governors of Punjab, India =

Head of state of Punjab, India

Governor of Punjab
- Emblem of Punjab

- Flag of India

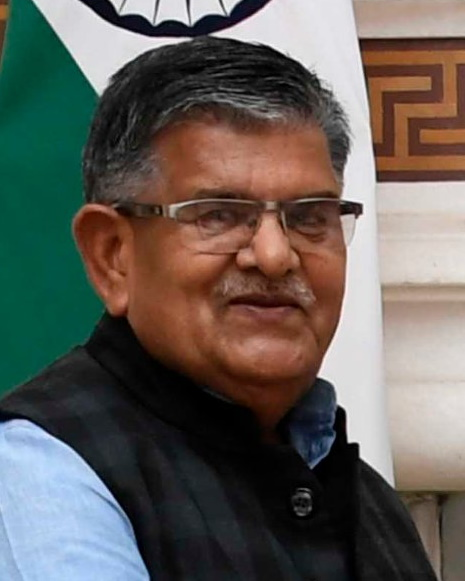
- Incumbent; Gulab Chand Kataria since 31 July 2024
- Style: His Excellency
- Residence: Lok Bhavan, Chandigarh
- Term length: At the pleasure of the president
- Precursor: Governor of Punjab
- Inaugural holder: Chandulal Madhavlal Trivedi
- Formation: 15 August 1947; 79 years ago (as East Punjab); 26 January 1950; 76 years ago (as Punjab)
- Website: Punjab Raj Bhavan

This is a list of the governors of Punjab state in India since 15 August 1947. Since 1985, the governor of Punjab has acted as the administrator of Chandigarh. There are 37 governors in total.

== List ==
Legend

- ^{†} Died in office
- ^{§} Transferred
- ^{‡} Resigned/removed

Color key

- indicates acting/additional charge
- indicates position vacant

| # | Portrait | Name (born – died) | Home state | Tenure in office | | | Appointer (President) |
| # | Portrait | Name (born – died) | Home state | From | To | Time in office | Appointer (President) |
Governor of East Punjab
| 1 | | Sir Chandulal Madhavlal Trivedi (1893–1980) | Bombay Presidency | 15 August 1947 | 26 January 1950 | 2 years, 164 days | Lord Mountbatten (Governor-General) |
Governor of Punjab
| 1 | | Chandulal Madhavlal Trivedi (1893–1980) | Bombay Presidency | 26 January 1950 | 11 March 1953 | 3 years, 44 days | Rajendra Prasad |
| 2 | | Chandeshwar Prasad Narayan Singh (1901–1994) | Bihar | 11 March 1953 | 15 September 1958 | 5 years, 188 days | Rajendra Prasad |
| 3 | | Narhar Vishnu Gadgil (1896–1966) | Madhya Pradesh | 15 September 1958 | 1 October 1962 | 4 years, 16 days | Rajendra Prasad |
| 4 | | Pattom A. Thanu Pillai (1885–1970) | Kerala | 1 October 1962 | 4 May 1964^{[§]} (Note: Transferred as the Governor of Andhra Pradesh) | 1 year, 216 days | Sarvepalli Radhakrishnan |
| 5 | | Hafiz Mohamad Ibrahim (1889–1968) | Uttar Pradesh | 4 May 1964 | 1 September 1965 | 1 year, 120 days | Sarvepalli Radhakrishnan |
| 6 | | Ujjal Singh (1895–1983) | Punjab | 1 September 1965 | 26 June 1966^{[§]} (Note: Transferred as the Governor of Tamil Nadu) | 298 days | Sarvepalli Radhakrishnan |
| 7 | | Dharma Vira; ICS (Retd) (1906–2000) | Uttar Pradesh | 27 June 1966 | 1 June 1967^{[§]} (Note: Transferred as the Governor of West Bengal) | 339 days | Sarvepalli Radhakrishnan |
| 8 | | Justice; Mehar Singh (Acting) | Punjab | 1 June 1967 | 16 October 1967 | 137 days | Zakir Husain |
| 9 | | Dadappa Chintappa Pavate (1899–1978) | Karnataka | 16 October 1967 | 21 May 1973 | 5 years, 217 days | Zakir Husain |
| 10 | | Mahendra Mohan Choudhry (1908–1982) | Assam | 21 May 1973 | 1 September 1977 | 4 years, 103 days | V. V. Giri |
| 11 | | Justice; Ranjit Singh Narula (1908–2005) (Acting) | Punjab | 1 September 1977 | 24 September 1977 | 23 days | Neelam Sanjiva Reddy |
| 12 | | Jaisukh Lal Hathi (1909–1982) | Gujarat | 24 September 1977 | 26 August 1981 | 3 years, 336 days | Neelam Sanjiva Reddy |
| 13 | | Amin ud-din Ahmad Khan (1911–1983) | Rajasthan | 26 August 1981 | 21 April 1982 | 238 days | Neelam Sanjiva Reddy |
| 14 | | Marri Chenna Reddy (1919–1996) | Andhra Pradesh | 21 April 1982 | 7 February 1983 | 292 days | Neelam Sanjiva Reddy |
| 15 | | Justice; Surjit Singh Sandhawalia (1925–2007) (Acting) | Punjab | 7 February 1983 | 21 February 1983 | 14 days | Zail Singh |
| 16 | | Anant Prasad Sharma (1919–1988) | Bihar | 21 February 1983 | 10 October 1983^{[§]} | 231 days | Zail Singh |
| 17 | | Bhairab Dutt Pande; ICS (Retd) (1917–2009) | Uttar Pradesh | 10 October 1983 | 3 July 1984 | 267 days | Zail Singh |
| 18 | | Kershasp Tehmurasp Satarawala (1916–2001) | Maharashtra | 3 July 1984 | 14 March 1985^{[‡]} | 254 days | Zail Singh |
| 19 | | Arjun Singh (1930–2011) | Madhya Pradesh | 14 March 1985 | 14 November 1985^{[‡]} | 245 days | Zail Singh |
| 20 | | Hokishe Sema (1921–2007) (Additional Charge) | Nagaland | 14 November 1985 | 26 November 1985 | 12 days | Zail Singh |
| 21 | | Shankar Dayal Sharma (1918–1999) | Madhya Pradesh | 26 November 1985 | 2 April 1986^{[§]} (Note: Transferred as the Governor of Maharashtra) | 127 days | Zail Singh |
| 22 | | Siddhartha Shankar Ray (1920–2010) | West Bengal | 2 April 1986 | 8 December 1989^{[‡]} | 3 years, 250 days | Zail Singh |
| 23 | | Nirmal Kumar Mukarji; IAS (Retd) (1921–2002) | National Capital Territory of Delhi | 8 December 1989 | 14 June 1990^{[‡]} | 188 days | Ramaswamy Venkataraman |
| 24 | | Virendra Verma (1916–2009) | Uttar Pradesh | 14 June 1990 | 18 December 1990^{[§]} (Note: Transferred as the Governor of Himachal Pradesh) | 187 days | Ramaswamy Venkataraman |
| 25 | | General; Om Prakash Malhotra (Retd); PVSM (1922–2015) | Jammu and Kashmir | 18 December 1990 | 7 August 1991^{[‡]} | 232 days | Ramaswamy Venkataraman |
| 26 | | Surendra Nath; IPS (Retd) (1926–1994) | National Capital Territory of Delhi | 7 August 1991 | 9 July 1994^{[†]} | 2 years, 336 days | Ramaswamy Venkataraman |
| 27 | | Justice; Sudhakar Panditrao Kurdukar (born 1935) (Acting) | Maharashtra | 10 July 1994 | 18 September 1994 | 70 days | Shankar Dayal Sharma |
| 28 | | Lieutenant General; B. K. N. Chhibber (Retd); PVSM AVSM VSM (born 1936) | Punjab | 18 September 1994 | 27 November 1999 | 5 years, 70 days | Shankar Dayal Sharma |
| 29 | | Lieutenant General; J. F. R. Jacob (Retd); PVSM (1921–2016) | West Bengal | 27 November 1999 | 8 May 2003 | 3 years, 162 days | K. R. Narayanan |
| 30 | | Justice (Retd); Om Prakash Verma (1937–2015) | Uttar Pradesh | 8 May 2003 | 3 November 2004^{[‡]} | 1 year, 179 days | A. P. J. Abdul Kalam |
| 31 | | Akhlaqur Rahman Kidwai (1921–2016) (Additional Charge) | National Capital Territory of Delhi | 3 November 2004 | 16 November 2004 | 13 days | A. P. J. Abdul Kalam |
| 32 | | General; Sunith Francis Rodrigues (Retd); PVSM VSM (1933–2022) | Maharashtra | 16 November 2004 | 22 January 2010 | 5 years, 67 days | A. P. J. Abdul Kalam |
| 33 | | Shivraj Patil (1935–2025) | Maharashtra | 22 January 2010 | 22 January 2015 | 5 years, 0 days | Pratibha Patil |
| 34 | | Kaptan Singh Solanki (born 1939) (Additional charge) | Madhya Pradesh | 22 January 2015 | 22 August 2016 | 1 year, 213 days | Pranab Mukherjee |
| 35 | | V. P. Singh Badnore (born 1948) | Rajasthan | 22 August 2016 | 30 August 2021 | 5 years, 8 days | Pranab Mukherjee |
| 36 | | Banwarilal Purohit (born 1940)(Additional charge till 11 September 2021) | Rajasthan | 31 August 2021 | 28 July 2024^{[‡]} | 2 years, 332 days | Ram Nath Kovind |
| – | – | Position Vacant | – | 28 July 2024 | 31 July 2024 | 3 days | – |
| 37 | | Gulab Chand Kataria (born 1944) | Rajasthan | 31 July 2024 | Incumbent | 2 years, 77 days | Droupadi Murmu |

== Oath ==
Main, [Apna Naam], parmatma di sauh khanda han (ya sachche dil nal iqrar karda han) ke main sachche dil nal te poori imandari nal Punjab de Governor (Rajpal) de ohde de farz nibhavanga (ya ohde de kamma nu poora karanga) te apni poori kabliyat nal sanvidhan (Constitution) te kanoon di rakhya, hifazat te bachaav karanga, te main Punjab de lokan di seva te bhalaai vich hamesha laggya rahanga

== See also ==
- Punjab, India
- Chief Minister of Punjab
- Governor (Indian states)
