= Ashok Bhan (judge) =

Indian judge (born 1943)

Ashok Bhan (born 2 October 1943) is a retired judge of the Supreme Court of India.

== Career ==
Bhan started practice in the Punjab and Haryana High Court in 1965. He also served as part-time Lecturer in Law faculty of Panjab University. He became the additional advocate general of Punjab in 1979. Bhan was designated as senior advocate in December 1982 and worked as senior standing counsel for the Chandigarh Administration as well as within the Department of Income Tax during his legal career. On 15 June 1990 Bhan was appointed as an additional judge of the Punjab and Haryana High Court. He was transferred to the Karnataka High Court in 1997. He served as acting chief justice from 26 June 2000 to 20 October 2000. Bhan was elevated as judge of the Supreme Court of India on 17 June 2001. On 8 February 2007, he was nominated in the post of executive chairman of National Legal Services Authority. Bhan retired from the post on 2 October 2008. After the retirement he became the president of National Consumer Disputes Redressal Commission (NCDRC) in New Delhi.
