= G. S. Singhvi =

Indian judge (born 1948)

G.S. Singhvi

Judge of the Supreme Court of India
- In office 12 November 2007 – 12 December 2013
- Appointed by: Pratibha Patil

Chief Justice of the Andhra Pradesh High Court
- In office 27 November 2005 – 11 November 2007

Judge of the Gujarat High Court
- In office 28 February 2005 – 26 November 2005

Personal details
- Born: 12 December 1948 (age 77) Jodhpur, Rajasthan
- Education: Rajasthan University

G.S. Singhvi (born 12 December 1948) is a retired judge of the Supreme Court of India. He served on the Supreme Court from November 2007 to December 2013.

== Early life and education ==
Singhvi was born at Jodhpur, Rajasthan on 12 December 1948. He graduated in 1968 from Jodhpur University and earned Bachelor of Laws (LL.B.) degree in 1971 from Rajasthan University with gold medal.

== Career ==
Singhvi practised in Rajasthan High Court, mainly in constitutional law.

He became a judge of the Rajasthan High Court on 20 July 1990, was transferred to Punjab and Haryana High Court on 28 April 1994 and to the Gujarat High Court on 28 February 2005.

He was elevated to the post of Chief Justice of the Andhra Pradesh High Court on 27 November 2005. He became a judge of Supreme Court of India on 12 November 2007.

== Notable judgements ==
=== 2G spectrum case ===
On 2 February 2012, a bench composed of Justice Singhvi and Justice AK Ganguly quashed 122 2G licenses issued in the year 2008 by A. Raja, then Union Telecom Minister, terming them as "unconstitutional and arbitrary".

=== Vehicle beacon lights case ===
Justice Singhvi headed a bench of Supreme Court dealing with abuse of vehicle beacon lights. During the hearings, the bench said, "A judge becomes hourable (sic) by his judgments and not by using red beacon at the top of his official car." The bench ordered all the governments to take steps to limit the list of dignitaries entitled to use red beacon with siren on their official cars.

=== Suresh Kumar Koushal v. Naz Foundation ===
A bench of Justice Singhvi and Justice S. J. Mukhopadhaya has upheld the Section 377 of India's penal code bans "sex against the order of nature", which is widely interpreted to mean homosexual sex. The judges stated that "a miniscule [sic] fraction of the country's population constitutes lesbians, gays, bisexuals or transgenders" and that the High Court had erroneously relied upon international precedents "in its anxiety to protect the so-called rights of LGBT persons". The United Nations human rights chief Navi Pillay voiced her disappointment at the re-criminalization of consensual same-sex relationships in India, calling it "a significant step backwards" for the country and UN chief Ban Ki-moon stressed on the need for equality and opposed any discrimination against lesbians, gays and bisexuals.

In the Puttaswamy v. Union of India case, the 9-judge bench commented on the verdict that the size of the population should have no barring on the protection of fundamental rights. The Bench commented that the "so-called rights" implies an illusion, but the claims were grounded in the Constitution. Subsequently, the judgement was overturned by a 5-judge constitutional bench on 6 September 2018 in Navtej Singh Johar v. Union of India.

=== 2011 Greater Noida Industrial Development Authority ===
In a judgement on 6 July 2011, the bench of Justice Singhvi along with Justice AK Ganguly ordered that entire 156 hectares of land be given back to the robbed farmers. The government had acquired the land for "development" but was handed over to builders for making commercial and residential complexes. The bench imposed a fine of ₹1 million (US$10,000) Greater Noida Industrial Development Authority (GNIDA) for its illegal act.

== Quotes ==
- "It is sad to say that my generation have failed the nation, and in a nation where 700 million people live below the poverty line we tend to talk about justice. We talk about our fundamental rights being trampled upon but what about those people who do not get two square meals a day, have no right to education, shelter, clothing and other basic amenities, and what about tribal people." –Justice Singhvi speaking at a seminar in Guwahati, Assam on 12 May 2012.
- "The 'jan sevaks' are fast becoming our masters, the first citizens followed by the rich and the poor only as third class citizens". –Justice Singhvi at a seminar in Guwahati, 12 May 2012.
