= H. S. Bedi =

Indian judge (1946–2024)

Harjit Singh Bedi (5 September 1946 – 21 November 2024) was a judge of the Supreme Court of India.

== Life and career ==
Bedi came from a family of agriculturists from Sahiwal (formerly known as Montgomery), now in Pakistan. He is a descendant of Guru Nanak, being number 17 in the direct line. After the partition of India his family was settled in Fazilka, a small township near the India-Pakistan border. His father, Tikka Jagjit Singh Bedi, was also a judge and served on the Punjab and Haryana High Court, retiring in 1969.

Bedi had his schooling from Bishop Cotton School, Shimla, and did his Senior Cambridge in 1962.

He was an advocate with the Bar Council of Punjab & Haryana beginning on 17 July 1972 and practiced civil, criminal and writ matters. He was also a part-time lecturer in the Department of Laws, Panjab University, Chandigarh from 1974 to 1983.

Bedi was appointed a Deputy Advocate General for Punjab in 1983, and was promoted to Senior Advocate in 1987. He was promoted again, to Additional Advocate General, and served in that position until 1989, when he was appointed Advocate General. He served as Punjab's Advocate General for about a year, until 1990.

He was appointed an Additional Judge of the Punjab and Haryana High Court on 15 March 1991 and permanent Judge on 8 July 1992. He was appointed the Chief Justice of the Bombay High Court on 3 October 2006 and a judge of Supreme Court of India on 12 January 2007. He retired on 5 September 2011.

Bedi died on 21 November 2024, at the age of 78.
