= D. K. Jain =

Indian judge (born 1948)

Judge of the Supreme Court of India
- In office 10 April 2006 – 24 January 2013
- Nominated by: Yogesh Kumar Sabharwal
- Appointed by: A. P. J. Abdul Kalam

Chief Justice of the Punjab and Haryana High Court
- In office 11 March 2005 – 9 April 2006
- Nominated by: Ramesh Chandra Lahoti
- Appointed by: A. P. J. Abdul Kalam

Judge of the Delhi High Court
- In office 19 March 1991 – 10 March 2005
- Nominated by: Ranganath Misra
- Appointed by: Ramaswamy Venkataraman

Personal details
- Born: 25 January 1948 (age 78)

Devinder Kumar Jain (born 25 January 1948; mostly known as D. K. Jain) is a former Indian judge. He is former judge of Supreme Court of India. He is also a former chief justice of the Punjab and Haryana High Court and a judge of the Delhi High Court.

== Early life and career ==
Jain was born on 25 January 1948. After completing a Bachelor of Science and Bachelor of Laws, he enrolled as an advocate at Delhi on 9 August 1974. He was appointed the additional judge of the Delhi High Court on 19 March 1991 and became a permanent judge from 23 January 1992. He was promoted as Chief Justice of Punjab and Haryana High Court on 11 March 2005. He was elevated as a judge of the Supreme Court of India on 10 April 2006. He retired from the Supreme Court on 24 January 2013. He delivered 135 judgments during his tenure. He was appointed the first court-appointed ombudsman for the Board of Cricket Control in India on 29 February 2019.
