= S. S. Nijjar =

Indian jurist (1949–2021)

S.S. Nijjar
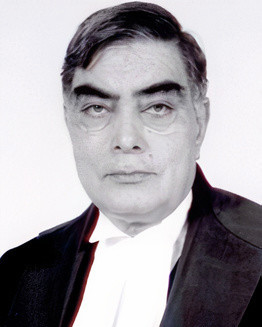
- Official portrait, 2009

Judge of the Supreme Court of India
- In office 17 November 2009 – 6 June 2014
- Nominated by: K. G. Balakrishnan
- Appointed by: Pratibha Patil

Chief Justice of the Calcutta High Court
- In office 8 March 2007 – 16 November 2009
- Nominated by: K. G. Balakrishnan
- Appointed by: Pratibha Patil

Judge of the Bombay High Court
- In office 26 April 1996 – 6 August 2000
- Nominated by: Aziz Mushabber Ahmadi
- Appointed by: Shankar Dayal Sharma

Judge of the Punjab and Haryana High Court
- In office 7 August 2000 – 6 March 2007
- Nominated by: Adarsh Sein Anand
- Appointed by: K. R. Narayanan
- In office 8 April 1996 – 24 April 1996
- Nominated by: Aziz Mushabber Ahmadi
- Appointed by: Shankar Dayal Sharma

Personal details
- Born: 7 June 1949 Bhar Singh Pura, Punjab, India
- Died: 26 March 2021 (aged 71) Chandigarh, India
- Children: 2
- Education: University College London (LL.B.); Middle Temple (Barrister-at-Law)

Surinder Singh Nijjar (7 June 1949 – 26 March 2021) was a British-Indian judge of the Supreme Court of India. Post-retirement, Nijjar practised as an arbitrator. Prior to his elevation as judge, Nijjar was a Senior Advocate and practised at the Punjab and Haryana High Court.

== Early life and education ==
Nijjar was born in Bhar Singh Pura village of Punjab, India on 7 June 1947. His family moved to Huddersfield, England in 1962 where he completed his early education. Sometime later he moved to Leeds to complete his A-Levels.

Nijar started his legal career at University College London by obtaining his LL.B. degree from UCL Faculty of Laws, then awarded by the University of London, in 1972.

== Career ==
Attained a pupillage right after, he was called to the Bar by Middle Temple. Unable to secure a civil tenancy, due to the prevalent racism at the English Bar at that time, Nijjar returned to India.

Enrolled as an Advocate in 1977 and practised constitutional, labour and commercial law at the Punjab and Haryana High Court. He got designated as a Senior Advocate by the same Court in 1989. Before being elevated as judge, Nijjar also served as an Additional Advocate-General for the State of Punjab.

On 8 April 1996, Nijjar was elevated as an additional judge of the Punjab and Haryana High Court. He was transferred as an Additional Judge of the Bombay High Court and assumed charge on 26 April 1996. Later became a permanent judge of the same Court on 3 April 1998. He was then transferred back to Punjab and Haryana High Court and assumed charge on 7 August 2000.

Nijjar then took charge as Chief Justice of the Calcutta High Court on 7 March 2007. Later elevated as a judge of the Supreme Court of India on 17 November 2009 and retired on 6 June 2014.

He was unanimously elected as 'Master of the Bench' of Middle Temple in 2011 and continued to hold this position until his demise.

== Notable judgements ==
Several of his notable judgements included:

- BALCO, Enercon India v. Enercon Gmbh
- Reliance Industries Ltd & Ors. v. Union of India
- Swiss Timing Ltd. v. Organising Committee, Commonwealth Games, 2010.
