= Donald Campbell Johnstone =

British Indian Judge

Sir Donald Campbell Johnstone (1857 – 1920) was a British Indian judge and former Chief Justice of Lahore and Punjab and Haryana High Court.

== Career ==
Sir Campbell Johnstone was the second son of Major General Sir Henry Campbell Johnstone, a former Bengal Army officer. He passed from Edinburgh Academy in 1877 and joined the Indian Civil Service in 1879.

He came to British India on 10 November 1879 and served as Assistant Commissioner in Punjab. He also worked as Assistant Collector in Bombay, junior and senior Financial Secretary of Punjab in between 1887 and 1891. In December 1891, Johnstone was appointed as District Judge of Punjab and became Divisional judge in 1895.

Johnstone was appointed as Puisne judge in 1905 and became the Chief Justice of Punjab High Court in 1915. He also served the chief justice of Lahore High Court till 19017.
