= Debi Singh Tewatia =

Indian justice

Debi Singh Tewatia (30 June 1930 – November, 2017) was a Chief justice of Calcutta High Court and former Advocate General of Punjab and Haryana.

== Career ==
Tewatia was born in the village of Kondal, Haryana. After completion of study from Lincoln's Inn he started his lawyer career at Gurgaon district Court in 1955. After two years, he shifted to the Punjab and Haryana High Court and was elected as the secretary of the High Court Bar Association in 1965. He was appointed Advocate General of Haryana in 1969. Tewatia was elevated to the Bench of the same High Court in February, 1970. He became the Chief Justice of the Calcutta High Court in 1987 from where he resigned in 1989. After resignation, he practiced in the Supreme Court of India. He died in December 2017.

== Books ==
- Debi Singh Tewatia (2011). A Journey Less Travelled. Universal Law Publishing Company. ISBN 978-93-5035-046-1.
