= Ranjit Singh Narula =

Indian judge (1908–2005)

Hon'ble Chief Justice (Retd.) Ranjit Singh Narula

10th Chief Justice of Punjab & Haryana High Court
- In office 11 May 1974 – 31 October 1977
- Nominated by: Ajit Nath Ray
- Appointed by: V. V. Giri
- Preceded by: Daya Krishna Mahajan
- Succeeded by: Anand Dev Koshal

Judge of Punjab & Haryana High Court
- In office 1 April 1965 – 10 May 1974
- Nominated by: P. B. Gajendragadkar
- Appointed by: S. Radhakrishnan

Personal details
- Born: 3 November 1915
- Died: 1 June 2005 (aged 89) New Delhi, India
- Education: DAV College, Lahore, Forman Christian College, University Law College, Lahore

Ranjit Singh Narula (3 November 1908 – 1 June 2005) was an Indian judge who served as the former Chief Justice of the Punjab & Haryana High Court from May 1974 to October 1977. He was the acting Governor of Punjab in September 1977. He was earlier the Governor of Haryana from March to September 1976.

== Education ==
Narula was born on 3 November 1915. He completed his schooling at Khalsa School in Nankana Sahib before pursuing his higher studies in Lahore, attending D.A.V. College, Forman Christian College, and University Law College.

== Career ==
He launched his formal legal career in 1942 by enrolling as an advocate at the Lahore High Court, followed by his registration as a Federal Court Agent the next year. Between 1944 and 1946, he took on the critical role of Official Defence Counsel, representing accused individuals during the secret trials of enemy operatives and Indian National Army (I.N.A.) personnel held under the Enemy Agents Ordinance.

In 1952, he enrolled as advocate before Supreme Court of India. Over the next decade, his leadership in the legal community grew; he was elected President of the Delhi High Court Bar Association for the 1963–64 term and served as the Chairman of the Bar Council of Delhi from 1964 to 1965. Throughout his years as an advocate, his practice spanned both civil and criminal litigation.

He transitioned to the judiciary in 1965 upon his appointment as Judge of the Punjab & Haryana High Court on 1 April 1965. He eventually rose to the position of Chief Justice of the Punjab and Haryana High Court on 11 May 1974. Alongside his judicial responsibilities, he also took on executive duties for a brief period, serving as the Acting Governor of Haryana from 27 March to 14 August 1976 and as Acting Governor of Punjab in September 1977. He resigned from the post of Chief Justice of Punjab & Haryana High Court on 31 October 1977 just a day before his scheduled retirement on 2 November 1977.

He was died on 1 June 2005 after a brief illness at the age of 89. He was survived by three sons and three daughters.

== Justice Narula Committee ==
In December 1993, the Delhi government under Chief Minister Madan Lal Khurana of the BJP, set up a committee under Justice (retd.) R.S. Narula seeking its recommendations to "review the status" of the recommendations made by Potti-Rosha, Kapur-Mittal and Jain-Aggarwal commissions after the 1984 anti-Sikh riots. In its report submitted in January 1994, the Narula committee recommended registration of cases against H K L Bhagat, Sajjan Kumar, and Jagdish Tytler.
