= V. K. Bali =

Indian judge (1945–2022)

Justice Vinod Kumar Bali
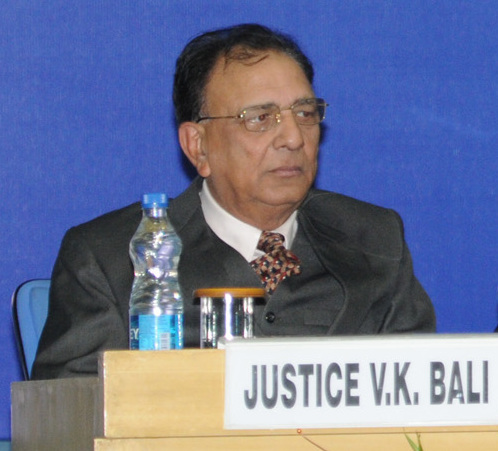

Chairman, Central Administrative Tribunal
- In office 8 March 2007 – 8 March 2012

Chief Justice, Kerala High Court
- In office 22 January 2006 – 24 January 2007

Judge, Rajasthan High Court
- In office February 2005 – January 2006

Judge, Punjab and Haryana High Court
- In office March 1991 – February 2005

Personal details
- Born: 24 January 1945
- Died: 24 December 2022 (aged 77) Chandigarh, India
- Citizenship: Indian
- Website: cgat.gov.in

Vinod Kumar Bali (24 January 1945 – 24 December 2022) was an Indian jurist who was the Chairman of Central Administrative Tribunal, Principal Bench, New Delhi, and Chief Justice of Kerala High Court.

== Career ==
After completing his graduation in Law from Punjab University, Chandigarh in 1967 Bali started practicing in District Courts, Karnal in the same year and shifted to the High Court of Punjab and Haryana at Chandigarh in 1973. He practiced on all subjects of law and specialized in Constitutional, Service, Labour and Industrial Disputes and Criminal Laws. He was designated as Senior Advocate at the age of 42 in 1987.

In the year 1991 he was elevated to Punjab and Haryana High Court and as a judge he has authored several Full Bench Judgments and decided several hundred criminal cases besides deciding Constitutional, Civil, Labour and Industrial matters. He served as the Chairman of Legal Services Authority, Haryana for a term of eight years. In the year 2005 he was transferred to Rajasthan High Court and served as the Chairman of Rajasthan State Legal Services Authority from 6 September 2006.

Bali was sworn in as Chief Justice, High Court of Kerala on 22 January 2006. During his tenure of one year as Chief Justice, he decided several constitutional matters of all the branches of law. During his tenure as Chief Justice, 120 Full Bench cases pending in Kerala High Court were disposed of. For the first time in the history of Kerala High Court, arrears of the cases were reduced by 15000 in one year. He retired on 24 January 2007 on attaining the age of superannuation.

Appointed Chairman, Central Administrative Tribunal, he assumed the office on 8 March 2007.

Bali died on 24 December 2022, at the age of 77.
