= Om Prakash Malhotra =

Indian Army general (1922–2015)

General Om Prakash Malhotra PVSM
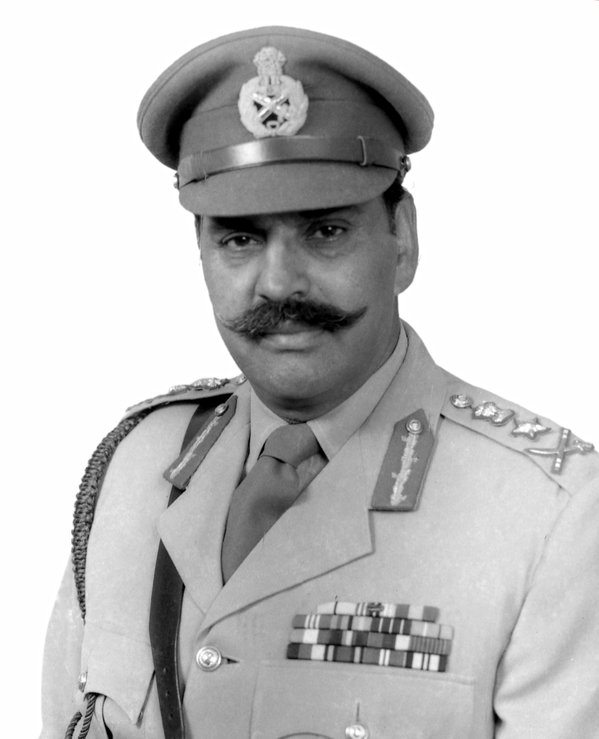

21st Governor of Punjab and 8th Administrator of Chandigarh
- In office 18 December 1990 – 7 August 1991
- President: R. Venkataraman
- Chief Minister: Vacant (President's rule)
- Preceded by: Virendra Verma
- Succeeded by: Surendra Nath

13th Indian Ambassador to Indonesia
- In office February 1982 – November 1984
- Preceded by: S. K. Bhutani
- Succeeded by: V. C. Khanna

21st Chairman of the Chiefs of Staff Committee
- In office 1 March 1979 – 31 May 1981
- President: Neelam Sanjiva Reddy
- Prime Minister: Morarji Desai; Charan Singh; Indira Gandhi
- Preceded by: Jal Cursetji
- Succeeded by: Idris Hasan Latif

10th Chief of the Army Staff (India)
- In office 1 June 1978 – 31 May 1981
- President: Neelam Sanjiva Reddy
- Prime Minister: Indira Gandhi; Morarji Desai; Charan Singh
- Preceded by: Tapishwar Narain Raina
- Succeeded by: K. V. Krishna Rao

Personal details
- Born: Om Prakash Malhotra; 6 August 1922 Srinagar, J&K, British India
- Died: 29 December 2015 (aged 93) Gurgaon, Haryana, India
- Citizenship: (British Raj) British Indian (1922–1947) (India) Indian (1947–2015)
- Spouse: Saroj Malhotra
- Education: Sri Pratap College
- Alma mater: Government College, Lahore; Indian Military Academy

Military service
- Allegiance: British India (1922–1947); India (1947–2015)
- Branch/service: British Indian Army (1941–1947); Indian Army (1947–1981)
- Years of service: 1941–1981
- Rank: General
- Unit: 37 Coorg Anti Tank Regiment; 20 Locating Regiment; 42 Field Regiment
- Commands: Southern Army; XI Corps; 36 Infantry Division; 167 Mountain Brigade; 1 Artillery Brigade
- Battles/wars: World War II; Burma Campaign; Battle of Sangshak; Indo-Pakistani War of 1965; Bangladesh Liberation War
- Service number: IC-478
- Award(s): Param Vishisht Seva Medal; Doctor of Letters

General Om Prakash Malhotra, PVSM (6 August 1922 – 29 December 2015), best known as OP Malhotra, was a senior officer who served as the 10th Chief of Army Staff in the Indian Army from 1978 – 1981. Upon retiring from his military service in India, he served in the Indian Foreign Service (IFS) when he tenured as the Indian Ambassador to Indonesia 1981–1984, and later served as a political administrator in India as the Governor of Punjab and Administrator of Chandigarh 1990–1991.

== Early life ==
Om Prakash Malhotra was born on 6 August 1922 in Srinagar, in the Kashmir Valley of the princely state of Jammu and Kashmir within British India, into a Punjabi Hindu family from Lahore. His family belonged to the Malhotra clan of Khatris.

Malhotra received his schooling first at Model High School, and then at Sri Pratap College, both in Srinagar. He then attended Government College, Lahore, before being selected to join the Indian Military Academy (IMA) in Dera Doon.

== Military career ==
He was commissioned into the Regiment of Artillery as a Second Lieutenant in November 1941. His first assignment was with 26 (Jacobs) Mountain Battery in Razmak, North West Frontier Province. He was later assigned to 15 (Jhelum) Mountain Battery which, as part of the 50th Parachute Brigade, fought against the Japanese during the Second World War on the Burmese front. He distinguished himself as a young officer in the Battle of Sangshak where he was wounded in action. He later became Second-in-Command of 13 (Dardoni) Mountain Battery.

Malhotra became an instructor at the School of Artillery in Deolali, and in 1946 attended the Long Gunnery Staff Course at the Royal School of Artillery in Larkhill, United Kingdom. He commanded artillery regiments across India between November 1950 and July 1961 including 37 Coorg Anti Tank Regiment, 20 Locating Regiment and 42 Field Regiment. In between he served at Army HQ, New Delhi, did the Defense Services Staff College course at Wellington and was later an instructor at the Defense Services Staff College, Wellington. He was then posted from 1962 to 1965 as the Military and Naval Attaché of India to the USSR, concurrently accredited to Poland and Hungary, holding the local rank of brigadier in the role.

Upon return from Moscow in August 1965, Malhotra commanded 1 Artillery Brigade, part of 1 Armoured Division and fought in Sialkot Sector during the Indo-Pakistani War of 1965. After the ceasefire with Pakistan he commanded 167 Mountain Brigade at Sela Pass, Tawang District, North-East Frontier Agency. He was promoted to acting Major General in September 1967 and commanded 36 Infantry Division in Saugor for two years, with a promotion to substantive major-general on 28 February 1968. From 29 September 1969 till May 1972 he was Chief of Staff, IV Corps, in Tezpur during the Bangladesh Liberation War. He played a crucial role during the Battle of Sialkot during the Bangladesh Liberation War where, "the thrust by the 1 Artillery Brigade under his command forced Pakistan to thin forces from its main attack column that had overrun Khemkaran and was making a bid to drive a wedge through the heart of Punjab." Subsequently, he was promoted to acting lieutenant-general on 29 May 1972 (substantive from 15 October) and given command of XI Corps in Jalandhar, which he commanded for two years. He was later the GOC-in-C Southern Command located at Pune.

In 1976, Malhotra was awarded the Param Vishist Seva Medal for "service of the most exceptional order". He was Vice Chief of Army Staff before taking over as Chief of Army Staff of the Indian Army on 31 May 1978 and serving in that post for three years. He was an Honorary Senior Colonel Commandant of the Regiment of Artillery of the Indian Army and also an Honorary General of the Nepalese Army.

== Ambassador to Indonesia and Governor of Punjab ==
After retiring from the Indian Army on 31 May 1981, Malhotra served as the Ambassador of India to Indonesia from 1981 to 1984. During 1990–1991, he was the Governor of the Indian State of Punjab and Administrator of Chandigarh when militancy in that state was at its height. Malhotra resigned from his post in protest when planned elections in the state were deferred by the National Election Commission without notice. Upon the postponement of the elections he said that "I have been through three Wars, I have been a General in the Wars, but I have never felt as defeated as I feel today after this announcement by the Election Commission that the Elections have been postponed."

== Post-retirement ==
A keen sportsman, Malhotra was the Founder President of the Asian Equestrian Federation in 1978. He was also the President of the Delhi Golf Club, New Delhi from 1979 to 1980.

He served for nine years as the President of the Equestrian Federation of India a post which he took on while serving as Chief of Army Staff and continued in post-retirement. He was responsible for the revival of the cavalry sport of Tent Pegging in India and across Asia, as an equestrian sport. After a demonstration of the sport in New Delhi to HRH Prince Philip, Duke of Edinburgh, the serving President of International Federation for Equestrian Sports, approval was granted for its inclusion as an equestrian sport under regional governance which led to its inclusion in the Asian Games from 1981 onwards.

Malhotra was a Founder Trustee of the Nehru Trust for the Indian Collections at the Victoria & Albert Museum, and served as the President of India's largest NGO, the "National Association for the Blind" in New Delhi. He was the Chairperson of the National Association for the Blind Centre For Blind Women & Disability Studies. He was an active member of Kiwanis Club of New Delhi, patron of the All India Federation of The Deaf, and a Trustee of the Delhi Cheshire Homes.

In addition, Malhotra was also the Founder and Chairman Emeritus of two charitable organisations Shiksha and Chikitsa.

== Personal life ==
Malhotra was married to Saroj, with whom he had two children. His son, Ajai Malhotra, was Ambassador of India to the Russian Federation from 2011 – 2013.

== Death ==
Malhotra died at his home in Gurugram due to complications of old age on 29 December 2015. On 31 December 2015 his funeral was held with full military honours at Brar Square. As former Chief of Army Staff from the Regiment of Artillery his body was carried to the funeral on an artillery gun carriage.

== Honours and awards ==
- 1976: Param Vishist Seva Medal for "service of the most exceptional order".
- 1977: Honorary Senior Colonel Commandant of the Regiment of Artillery.
- 1980: Honorary General of the Nepalese Army.
- 1994: conferred the Degree of Doctor of Letters Honoris Causa by University of Jammu

== Dates of rank ==
Insignia	Rank	Component	Date of rank
	Second Lieutenant	British Indian Army	9 November 1941 (emergency)
	Lieutenant	British Indian Army	1 October 1942 (war-substantive); 27 October 1945 (substantive; regular commission)
	Captain	British Indian Army	3 January 1944 (acting); 4 January 1944 (temporary)
	Major	British Indian Army	4 January 1944 (acting)
	Lieutenant	Indian Army	15 August 1947 (Note: Upon independence in 1947, India became a Dominion within the British Commonwealth of Nations. As a result, the rank insignia of the British Army, incorporating the Tudor Crown and four-pointed Bath Star ("pip"), was retained, as George VI remained Commander-in-Chief of the Indian Armed Forces. After 26 January 1950, when India became a republic, the President of India became Commander-in-Chief, and the Ashoka Lion replaced the crown, with a five-pointed star being substituted for the "pip.")
	Captain	Indian Army	22 April 1948
	Captain	Indian Army	26 January 1950 (recommissioning and change in insignia)
	Major	Indian Army	22 April 1955
	Lieutenant-Colonel	Indian Army	22 April 1958
	Colonel	Indian Army	13 October 1964
	Brigadier	Indian Army	22 March 1963 (local); 26 May 1965 (substantive)
	Major General	Indian Army	22 August 1967 (acting); 28 February 1968
	Lieutenant-General	Indian Army	29 May 1972 (acting); 15 October 1972 (substantive)
	General (COAS)	Indian Army	1 June 1978

== Notes ==
Military offices
Preceded by Tapishwar Narain Raina	Chief of Army Staff; 1978–1981	Succeeded by Kotikalapudi Venkata Krishna Rao
Preceded by A M Vohra	Vice Chief of Army Staff; 20 January 1977 – 31 May 1978	Succeeded by S L Menezes
Preceded by Sartaj Singh	General Officer Commanding-in-Chief Southern Command; 1 August 1974 – 19 January 1977	Succeeded by A M Vohra
Government offices
Preceded by Virendra Verma	Governor of Punjab; 1990–1991	Succeeded by Surendra Nath
