= Mahesh Mittal Kumar =

Mahesh Mittal Kumar took over charge as Chairman, Company Law Board on 5 June 2015 and continued as such till 31 May 2016. He was then appointed as the First President of National Company Law Tribunal on the abolition of Company Law Board on 1st June 2016. During his tenure, 28 benches of the NCLT started functioning from 14 states. He demitted office on 5 January 2020.https://nhrc.nic.in/biodata/bio-data-justice-shri-mm-kumar He served as 31st Chief Justice of Jammu and Kashmir High Court.

He was born on 5 January 1953. He took office as Chief Justice on 8 June 2012 and retired on 4 January 2015. Previously, he worked as judge at Punjab and Haryana High Court.

Kumar has an illustrious academic and professional record. He qualified his LLB from Punjabi University, Patiala in 1977 and was enrolled as an Advocate in the same year. He commenced his practice in the District Courts of Sangrur. In 1979, he went to England for higher studies and qualified for LLM from the University of Birmingham. After returning to India he joined the Chamber of Kuldip Singh, Bar-at-Law (who was directly elevated from bar to the Supreme Court). He authored a book titled Control of Exclusion Clauses in England and India published by Ravenswood London (1985).

He worked as part-time faculty at the Department of Law, Punjab University, Chandigarh from 1984-90. He was elected as Vice-President of the Punjab and Haryana High Court Bar Association for 1991-92 and later appointed Additional Advocate General (Punjab) from October 1995 to November 1996.

Kumar was elevated as a judge of the Punjab and Haryana High Court at Chandigarh on 2 July 2001. he worked as executive chairman, Legal Services Authority and Chairman, mediation committee and held Mega Lok Adalats. During his tenure as a judge of Punjab and Haryana High Court, he delivered a large a number of landmark judgements in every branch of law including constitutional law, company law, service law, civil law, election law, land acquisition, tax, and PIL. He has made significant contributions to build the Chandigarh Judicial Academy and the Rajiv Gandhi National Law University Patiala, and is a visiting professor at the latter.

Kumar was later appointed Chief Justice of Jammu and Kashmir High Court on 8 June 2012. As Chief Justice of Jammu and Kashmir High Court, he dealt with many PIL concerning world-famous Dal Lake (Dal Judge), violation of Master Plan in Srinagar, Jammu and Katra; corruption cases, popularized use of video conferencing, Mega Lok Adalats and a number of other projects. He has the distinction of holding the courts during September 2014 when the High court building (10 ft (3.0 m) water), District court building (18 ft (5.5 m) water) and his own house (8 ft (2.4 m) water) were all flooded. He along with his family were rescued at 2 o’clock during the night of 7 and 8 September 2014 when flash floods were reported. The new address of the High Court was an unoccupied house allotted to a judge on Gupkar Road, Sri Nagar. In the makeshift High Court a number of insurance cases were decided by him, paving the way for restoring many business establishments to their normal business activities. He is well known for his independent approach and impeccable integrity. He superannuated on 4 January 2015.

After retirement Justice Kumar conducted a number of commercial arbitrations which included the cases referred by the Supreme Court and the High Courts.

Justice Kumar then took over charge as Chairman, Company Law Board on 5 June 2015 and continued as such till 31 May 2016. He served as first president of National Company Law Tribunal on the abolition of Company Law Board on 1 June 2016 till 1 June 2018.
