= B. D. Pande =

Indian politician

Bhairab Dutt Pande

Governor of West Bengal
- In office 12 September 1981 – 10 October 1983
- Chief Minister: Jyoti Basu
- Preceded by: Tribhuvan Narain Singh
- Succeeded by: Anant Sharma

Cabinet Secretary of India
- In office 2 November 1972 – 31 March 1977
- Prime Minister: Indira Gandhi
- Preceded by: T. Swaminathan
- Succeeded by: N. K. Mukarji

Personal details
- Born: 17 March 1917 Almora district, Uttarakhand, British India
- Died: 4 April 2009 (aged 92) Almora
- Spouse: Vimla
- Children: 3
- Occupation: Indian Civil Service
- Known for: Civil Service
- Awards: Padma Vibhushan, Padma Shri

Bhairab Dutt Pande (17 March 1917 – 2009) was a member of the Indian Civil Service and Union Cabinet Secretary of the Government of India under Indira Gandhi. He served as the Governor of West Bengal (1981–1983), and Punjab (1983–1984), and the Administrator of Chandigarh for a brief period.

Born in Almora, in the Indian state of Uttarakhand, Pande served as a Cabinet Secretary to the Union Government from 2 November 1972 to 31 March 1977. When President's rule was imposed on Punjab, he served as the governor of the state.

Pande was married to Vimla Pande. They had three children: Arvind Pande, IAS, environmentalist Lalit Pande, and Ratna Pande. His brother-in-laws were Vinod Chandra Pande, a former governor and Union Cabinet Secretary and Govind Chandra Pande a Padmi Shri and noted scholar and historian.

He was one of the last living members of the Imperial Civil Service, having entered in the 1939 batch.

The Government of India awarded Pande the fourth highest civilian honour of the Padma Shri, in 1972, for his contributions to Indian society and the Padma Vibhushan in 2000.

He is author of his famous autobiography book released after 5 years of his demise as per his wish name “In the Service of Free India” Memoir of a civil servant, by B D Pande.
