= O. P. Verma =

Indian politician (1937–2015)

Justice (Retired) Om Prakash Verma
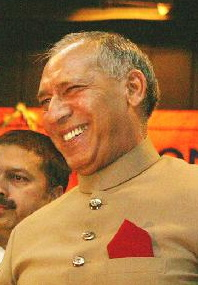

Governor of Punjab Administrator of Chandigarh
- In office 8 May 2003 – 3 November 2004
- Appointed by: A. P. J. Abdul Kalam
- Chief Minister: Amarinder Singh
- Preceded by: J. F. R. Jacob
- Succeeded by: Akhlaqur Rahman Kidwai (Additional charge)

Governor of Haryana
- Additional charge
- In office 2 July 2004 – 7 July 2004
- Chief Minister: Om Prakash Chautala
- Preceded by: Babu Parmanand
- Succeeded by: Akhlaqur Rahman Kidwai

Chief Justice of the Kerala High Court
- In office 20 November 1997 – 19 March 1999
- Appointed by: K. R. Narayanan
- Preceded by: U. P. Singh
- Succeeded by: Arijit Pasayat

Personal details
- Born: 20 March 1937
- Died: 8 December 2015 (aged 78)

Om Prakash Verma (20 March 1937 – 8 December 2015) was an Indian politician. He served as the Governor of Punjab (2003–04), and Haryana (briefly during July 2004), Chief Justice of the Kerala High Court and the chairman of the Himachal Pradesh Human Rights Commission. He was born in Garhmukteshwar District, Ghaziabad, Uttar Pradesh. He was also the Lokayukta of Himachal Pradesh before being appointed the Punjab governor.

He studied law at the Campus Law Centre of the Faculty of Law, University of Delhi.
