= Sanjay Kishan Kaul =

Indian judge (born 1958)

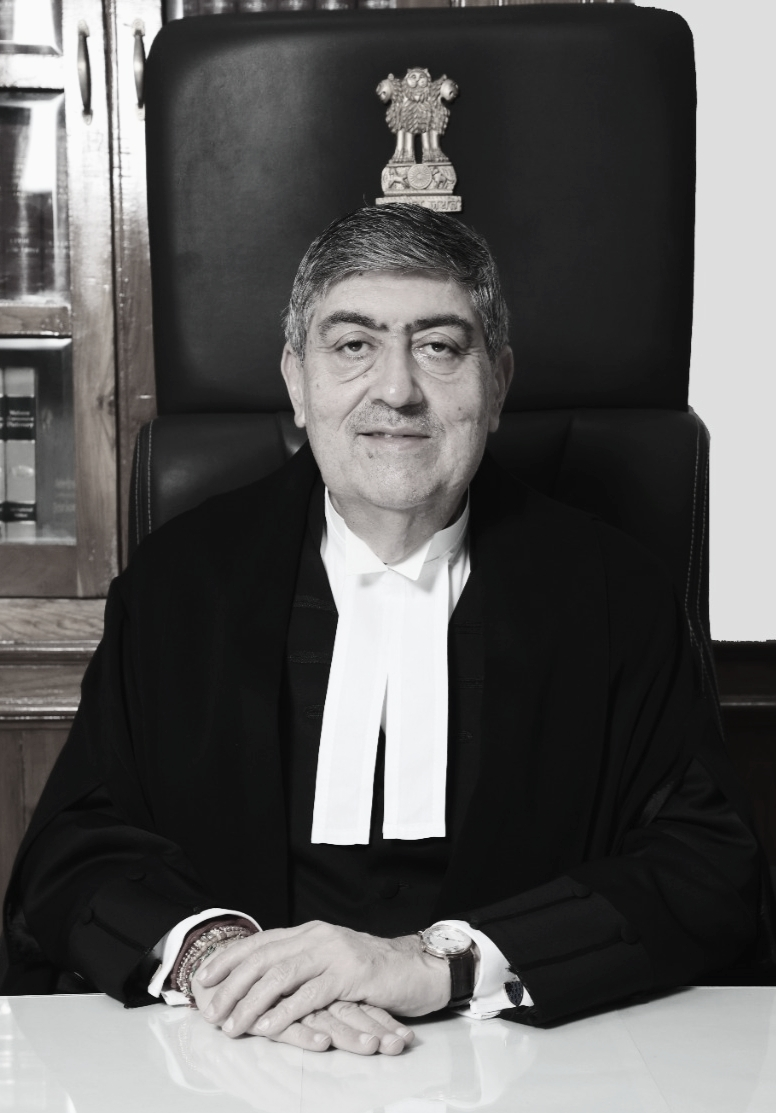

Judge of Supreme Court of India
- In office 16 February 2017 – 25 December 2023
- Nominated by: Jagdish Singh Khehar
- Appointed by: Pranab Mukherjee

Chief Justice of Madras High Court
- In office 26 July 2014 – 15 February 2017
- Nominated by: Rajendra Mal Lodha
- Appointed by: Pranab Mukherjee

Chief Justice of Punjab and Haryana High Court
- In office 1 June 2013 – 25 July 2014
- Nominated by: Altamas Kabir
- Appointed by: Pranab Mukherjee

Judge of Delhi High Court
- In office 3 May 2001 – 31 May 2013; Acting CJ-23 September 2012-25 September 2012
- Nominated by: Adarsh Sein Anand
- Appointed by: Kocheril Raman Narayanan

Personal details
- Born: 26 December 1958 (age 67)
- Education: St Stephen's College, Delhi; Faculty of Law, University of Delhi; Delhi University

Sanjay Kishan Kaul (born 26 December 1958) is a former judge and lawyer who served as a judge of the Supreme Court of India from 2017 until his retirement in 2023. He has served as the first puisne judge, senior-most after the Chief Justice of India. Also, he has been the ex officio executive chairman of National Legal Services Authority.

He is a former chief justice of Madras High Court and Punjab and Haryana High Court and a former judge of Delhi High Court. He has also served as the acting chief justice of Delhi High Court.

== Personal life ==
=== Early life and education ===
A native of Srinagar, Sanjay Kishan Kaul was born on 26 December 1958 to a Kashmiri Pandit family. His great-great-grandfather, Suraj Kishan Kaul, was the Revenue minister in the Regency council of the princely state of Jammu and Kashmir. His great-grandfather, Sir Daya Kishan Kaul, was a statesman and diplomat who served as the finance minister of Jammu & Kashmir state. His grandfather, Raja Upinder Kishen Kaul, had a distinguished career in public service.

After schooling in Modern School, New Delhi, Sanjay Kishan Kaul graduated in economics (Hons.) from Delhi University, studying in St. Stephen's College, Delhi. He then took a degree in law, studying at the Faculty of Law, University of Delhi, taking the LLB in 1982.

He is married to Mrs Shivani Kaul who was a teacher in Modern School Humayun Road. He has two daughter's Aakanksha Kaul Khorana and Upasna Kaul Mehta.

=== Interests and associations ===
Kaul is a member of various prestigious institutions like Indian International center, India Law Institute, India Habitat Center, Roshanara club amongst others. Theatre, music, golf & reading, including subjects unrelated to law are amongst his other areas of interest.

== Career ==
=== As a lawyer ===
During his 19-year career, he handled mainly commercial, civil & writ matters in Delhi high court & Supreme court of India.

=== As a judge ===
Kaul was appointed additional judge of Delhi high court on 3 May 2001, and was made a permanent judge in 2003. He was also the acting chief justice of Delhi high court in September 2012. He became Chief Justice of Punjab and Haryana High Court in June 2013.

=== As a chancellor ===
The chancellor of TNDALU is the chief justice of Madras high court. Hence he served as the chancellor of TNDALU and he has also visited the college and addressed the students.

== Notable judgments ==
In the year 2018, on 24 August, Kaul along with eight judges ruled in favour of Privacy being a Fundamental Right, which is a watershed moment in the history of Constitutional Jurisprudence of India.

- 2008 Judgement as Delhi HC Judge, where Kaul dismissed the charges levied against M F Husain for his painting of a lady later termed as 'Bharat Mata', accusing him of obscenity. Upholding free speech and expression, Kaul expressed agreement with Husain's contention that there was no deliberate intention on his part to hurt anybody's religious feeling as the figure actually represented an "anthropomorphic depiction of a nation" in the form of a distressed woman. Kaul in his conclusion mentions,
  Pluralism is the soul of democracy. There should be freedom for the thought we hate. Freedom of speech has no meaning if there is no freedom after speech. The reality of democracy is to be measured by the extent of freedom and accommodation it extends.
- In Union of India v. Union Carbide (2023), Kaul rejected the government's plea for additional compensation for victims of the Bhopal Gas leak. Kaul also noted that there were still surplus funds from the original compensation that could be used to satisfy future claims from victims.

During his tenure on the Supreme Court, Kaul authored 167 judgments.
