= Punjab High Court =

Punjab High Court may refer to:

- Punjab and Haryana High Court, high court for the states of Punjab and Haryana in the Indian union territory of Chandigarh
- Lahore High Court, Lahore, Punjab, Pakistan
