= V. P. Singh Badnore =

Indian politician (born 1948)

Vijayender Pal Singh Badnore
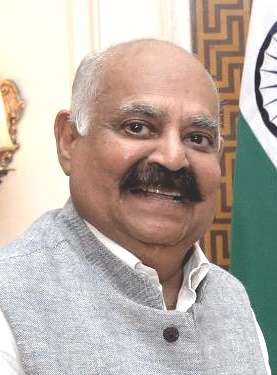

28th Governor of Punjab 15th Administrator of Chandigarh
- In office 22 August 2016 – 30 August 2021
- President: Ramnath Kovind
- Chief Minister: Parkash Singh Badal; Amarinder Singh
- Preceded by: Kaptan Singh Solanki
- Succeeded by: Banwarilal Purohit

Member of Parliament, Rajya Sabha
- In office 5 July 2010 – 5 July 2016
- Constituency: Rajasthan

Member of Parliament, Lok Sabha
- In office 1999–2009
- Preceded by: Rampal Upadhyay
- Succeeded by: C. P. Joshi
- Constituency: Bhilwara

Personal details
- Born: 12 May 1948 (age 78) Badnor, Rajputana, India
- Party: Bharatiya Janata Party
- Spouse: Alka Singh (m. 1978)
- Children: 2
- As of 14 September, 2006

Vijayender Pal Singh Badnore (born 12 May 1948) is an Indian politician who was the 28th Governor of Punjab. He was a member of Rajya Sabha, elected on 17 June 2010. He was earlier a member of the 14th Lok Sabha and 13th Lok Sabha of the Indian Parliament. He represented the Bhilwara constituency of Rajasthan. a member of the Bharatiya Janata Party (BJP) political party from 1999 to 2009 and also 4 time Member of Rajasthan Legislative Assembly (1977–80, 1985–90, 1993–98, 1998–99).

== Personal life ==
Singh was born in Badnor, Rajasthan to Gopal Singh and Raj Kanwar Nathawad. He completed his Bachelor of Arts (Honours) in English and Business Management from Mayo College in Ajmer. Singh married Alka Singh on 25 November 1978. They have a son named Avijit and a daughter Divija.

== Career ==
Badnore was a member of Rajasthan Legislative Assembly from 1977 to 1980, 1985–90, 1993–98 and 1998–99. He was the Cabinet Minister for Irrigation in the Government of Rajasthan from 1988 to 1999. He was the vice-president in BJP Sangathan Rajasthan for over 15 years.

He was also a member of 13th (1999–2004) and 14th Lok Sabha (2004–2009), where he was a member of standing committee of Parliament for last 14 years and a convener of the Drafting committee of the Electricity Act 2003. Badnore was a member of the Rajya Sabha from 2010 to 2016, being nominated to the Panel of Vice-Chairman, Rajya Sabha in August 2014.

He was the Chairman Special Task Force to rehabilitate tigers in Sariska (Rajasthan), Government of Rajasthan 2005 to 2009, after the Sariska debacle – when all tigers were poached in Sariska in 2003–2004. Rehabilitation of tigers was done by translocation of tigers from Ranthambore Tiger Reserve.

He was appointed the Governor of Punjab on 17 August 2016. He relinquished office on 30 August 2021.

Lok Sabha
Preceded by Rampal Upadhyay	Member of Parliament for Bhilwara; 1999 – 2009	Succeeded by C. P. Joshi
Political offices
Preceded by Kaptan Singh Solanki	Governor of Punjab, India; 22 August 2016 – 22 August 2021	Succeeded by Banwarilal Purohit
