= Shiavax Jal Vazifdar =

Shiavax Jal Vazifdar (May 4, 1956), born to a Parsi family, is a former Chief Justice of the Punjab and Haryana High Court in India.

== Career ==
He studied at Rishi Valley School, graduating from there in 1972 and obtained his Bachelor of Laws from Hinduja Law College. He enrolled as an advocate of Bar Council of Maharashtra and Goa in 1980. He practiced Civil, Constitutional, Company and Arbitration cases in the Bombay High Court.

In January 2001, he was sworn in as a Judge of the Bombay High Court. In 2016, he was sworn in as Chief Justice of the Punjab and Haryana High Court. He retired in May 2018.
