= Kaptan Singh Solanki =

Indian politician

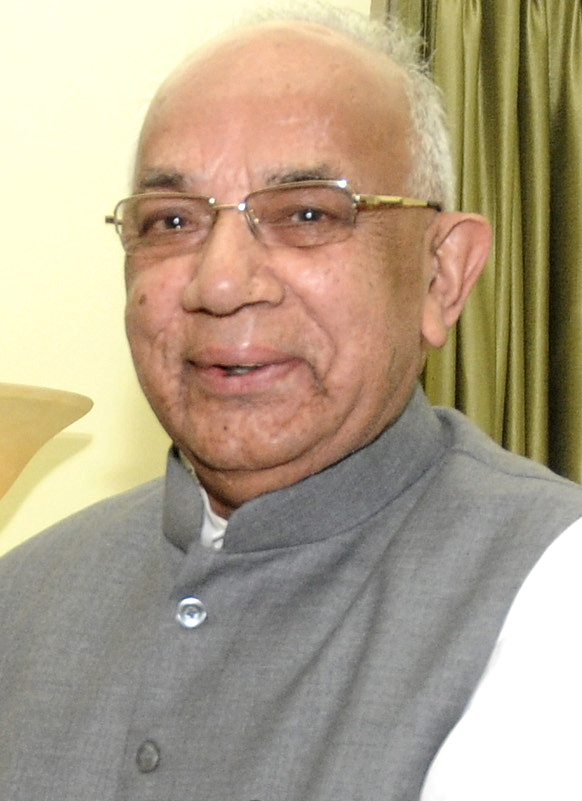
- Solanki in 2014

17th Governor of Tripura
- In office 22 August 2018 – 28 July 2019
- Chief minister: Biplab Kumar Deb
- Preceded by: Keshari Nath Tripathi
- Succeeded by: Ramesh Bais

15th Governor of Haryana
- In office 27 July 2014 – 21 August 2018
- Chief minister: Bhupinder Singh Hooda; Manohar Lal Khattar
- Preceded by: Jagannath Pahadia
- Succeeded by: Satyadev Narayan Arya

Governor of Punjab and administrator of Chandigarh (Additional charge)
- In office 21 January 2015 – 22 August 2016
- Chief minister: Parkash Singh Badal
- Preceded by: Shivraj Patil
- Succeeded by: V. P. Singh Badnore

Personal details
- Born: 1 July 1939 (age 87) Bhind district, Central Provinces and Berar, British India (now in Madhya Pradesh, India)
- Party: Bharatiya Janata Party
- Spouse: Rani (1959–present)
- Children: 5
- Profession: Politician

Kaptan Singh Solanki (born 1 July 1939) is an Indian politician of the Bharatiya Janata Party and the 17th governor of Tripura. From August 2009, he was the member of the parliament of India representing Madhya Pradesh State in the Rajya Sabha, the upper house until May 2014.

== Early life ==
Kaptan Singh Solanki was born on 1 July 1939 in Garhpara, Madhya Pradesh. He studied at Vikram University, Ujjain, P.G.B.T. College, Ujjain and Maharani Luxmibai College, Jiwaji University, Gwalior. He was a teacher in Banmor, Morena district, from 1958 to 1965 and later became a professor at P.G.V. College, Gwalior from 1966 to 1999. He was appointed the governor of Haryana to replace Jagannath Pahadia, whose five year term ended on 26 July 2014.

== Personal life ==
He has been married to Shrimati Rani Solanki since 1959, with two daughters and three sons.

Political offices
Preceded by Jagannath Pahadia	Governor of Haryana; 27 July 2014 – 25 August 2018	Succeeded by Satyadev Narayan Arya
Preceded by Shivraj Patil	Governor of Punjab; 21 January 2015 – 22 August 2016	Succeeded by V. P. Singh Badnore
Preceded by Shivraj Patil	Administrator of Union Territory of Chandigarh; 21 January 2015 – 22 August 2016	Succeeded by V. P. Singh Badnore
Preceded by Tathagata Roy	Governor of Tripura; 25 August 2018 – 28 July 2019	Succeeded by Ramesh Bais
