= Nirmal Kumar Mukarji =

Indian civil servant

- নির্মল কুমার মুখার্জি

Governor of Punjab Administrator of Chandigarh
- In office 8 December 1989 – 14 June 1990
- Preceded by: Siddharta Shankar Ray
- Succeeded by: Virendra Verma

13th Cabinet Secretary of India
- In office 1977–1980
- Prime Minister: Morarji Desai; Charan Singh; Indira Gandhi
- Preceded by: B.D. Pande
- Succeeded by: S.S. Grewal

Personal details
- Born: Nirmal Kumar Mukarji; 9 January 1921 New Delhi, India
- Died: 29 August 2002 (aged 81) New Delhi, India
- Education: St. Stephen's College, Delhi; Harvard University

Nirmal Kumar Mukarji (9 January 1921 – 29 August 2002) was an Indian administrator and the last member of the Indian Civil Service to serve. In the course of a long career he was Home Secretary, Cabinet Secretary, and eventually Governor of Punjab.

Born in Delhi to Satyanand Mukarji, Principal of St. Stephen's College, Delhi, Mukarji was educated at St. Stephen's and subsequently entered the ICS at the top of the last intake, in 1943.

== In the ICS ==
Assigned to the Punjab cadre, he was assigned as the confidential secretary of the Governor of Punjab, a post that he held till Independence in 1947. As part of the assignment, he was privy to most discussions involving the Partition of the Punjab between India and Pakistan, and part of the team that divided government resources between the two new Punjabs. Choosing to join India in 1947, he was appointed District Collector in a number of sensitive border districts, particularly Ferozepur.

After serving his time in the districts, he was moved to Delhi where he was put in charge of the Ministry for Irrigation, which at the time was planning the Bhakra-Nangal Dam, a project dear to Jawaharlal Nehru's heart. After the commissioning of the dam, he was moved back to Punjab and then to Jammu and Kashmir as Chief Secretary of those two states, after spending two years at Harvard's Weatherhead Centre for International Affairs It was as Chief Secretary of Jammu and Kashmir that he had to organise the defence of the state during the Bangladesh War of 1971.

Following the 1971 war, he was assigned to the Home Ministry as its senior bureaucrat. His time as Union Home Secretary was marked with clashes with the then Prime Minister, Indira Gandhi, and her 'kitchen cabinet', including her son Sanjay Gandhi. On the morning that the Emergency was declared in 1975, he was transferred out of the Home Ministry and its control over the Police force to the Ministry of Civil Aviation.

His reputation for independence and the fact that he was the only senior bureaucrat of the time visibly seen to be unconnected with the excesses of the Emergency meant that when the Janata government of 1977 took office, he was their choice for Cabinet Secretary. In that position, he helped draft the Constitutional Amendments that removed the alterations made by Mrs. Gandhi to the Constitution during the Emergency that impacted on Fundamental Rights. After Morarji Desai was removed from office, he saw an increase in the responsibilities of the Cabinet Secretary's post as Charan Singh found himself unable or unwilling to chair Cabinet meetings.

Following Indira Gandhi's re-election in 1980, he continued to serve as Cabinet Secretary, Mrs. Gandhi making a point of not asking for his resignation, until he retired, the last ICS officer to do so.

== Recommendation to end the IAS ==
He came to the view that the IAS is inappropriate for India. He wrote in 1994: "Bureaucratic arrangements must fall in line with the multi-layered character of the polity. The central, state and local government bureaucracies must, therefore, be placed squarely under the control of the elected rulers at each level. A suitable way needs to be found to close the IAS shop." He was supported in this by B.D. Pande, ICS (1938), also a former Cabinet Secretary.

== After retirement ==
Following his retirement, he wrote occasionally for The Statesman, The Hindu, Mainstream, Seminar, and Frontline magazine. He continued to take considerable interest in issues of bureaucratic reform, administrative devolution, and the affairs of Punjab (India). Soon after he retired, he joined the Centre for Policy Research in New Delhi, where he worked on Panchayati Raj and issues of federalism for some years in the mid-1980s, as Rajiv Gandhi put into motion plans for increasing the degree of administrative power assigned to those village-level organisations. He also contributed to the Oral History Project at Teen Murti Library, Delhi.

== Governor of Punjab ==
When the Khalistan movement burst into prominence in Punjab, the government at first sent law-and-order hardliners to the troubled state; Arjun Singh and then Siddhartha Shankar Ray both served as Governors of that state while it was under President's Rule. When the V.P. Singh government came into power in 1989, it chose to change the approach to the insurgency that the state government should take, and so appointed Mukarji as the head of the state administration and the Governor of the state.

Mukarji quickly reduced the intensity of counter-insurgency operations and put into place a timetable that would see the end of President's Rule and fresh elections. This approach paid off within a few years.

== After Punjab ==
After leaving the Raj Bhavan in Chandigarh, Mukarji continued to write on issues related to Punjab; his last major public appearance was as the keynote speaker and chief guest at the Indian Administrative Service's 50th Anniversary celebrations in Mussourie in 1997, where he shocked the assembly by calling, in his speech, for an end to the all-India tenured services, and their replacement by specialised professionals.

He also founded and was the Chairman of the Pakistan-India People's Forum for Peace and Democracy, one of the first organisations to argue for people-to-people or 'third-track' diplomacy as a method of reducing tensions between the two countries.

He died in August 2002 in Delhi.
