= Virendra Verma =

Indian politician

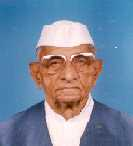
- Virendra Verma

Member of Rajya Sabha
- In office 3 April 1984 – 14 June 1990
- Constituency: Uttar Pradesh

Governor of Punjab and Administrator of Chandigarh
- In office 14 June 1990 – 18 December 1990

7th Governor of Himachal Pradesh
- In office 20 December 1990 – 29 January 1993
- Preceded by: B. Rachaiah
- Succeeded by: Surendra Nath (Additional charge)

Member of 12th Lok Sabha
- In office 10 March 1998 – 26 April 1999
- Preceded by: Chaudhary Munawwar Hasan
- Succeeded by: Amir Alam Khan

Personal details
- Born: 18 September 1916 Shamli, United Provinces of Agra and Oudh, British India
- Died: 2 May 2009 (aged 92) Shamli, Uttar Pradesh, India
- Party: Bharatiya Janata Party; Indian National Congress; Janata Dal; Rashtriya Lok Dal
- Spouse: Rameshwari Devi (1940 – 2017)
- Children: Satyendra Verma; Sadhna Kumar; Sunita Verma-Kurvari
- Education: Meerut College (L.L.B.)
- Profession: Politician, Freedom Fighter

Virendra Verma (18 September 1916 – 2 May 2009) was an Indian politician, born in Shamli, Uttar Pradesh. He served as the Governor of Punjab and the Administrator of Chandigarh (1990) as well as the Governor of Himachal Pradesh (1990–1993).

== Personal life ==
Virendra Verma was educated in J.H. School in Shamli, then DAV/SD High School in Muzaffarnagar and after his graduation attained an L.L.B. in 1943 from Meerut College, Meerut. Verma married Rameshwari Devi in June 1940 and together had one son and two daughters.

He had special interests in education, agriculture, and sports (including wrestling, volleyball, and field hockey - the latter two of which he captained while in college). Additionally, Verma took a deep interest in the uplifting of farmers, Mazdoors, backward classes/scheduled castes, and Harijans.

He had, in his career, visited the U.S., Canada, Jamaica, Cuba, Mexico, England, the Netherlands, France, West Germany, Switzerland, Italy, Turkey, Malaysia, Indonesia, Singapore, Egypt, and the U.A.E.

== Political career ==
Virendra Verma was previously associated with the Indian National Congress (INC) while holding the following positions and memberships: President of the District Board, Muzaffarnagar (1948–1952), member of the District Congress Committee, Muzaffarnagar (1950–1959), member of the Executive Council of U.P. Congress (1960–1967), member of the All India Congress Committee (1950–1980), and member of the Congress Working Committee (1977–1980).

In 1978 INC split, Virendra Verma, P.V. Narasima Rao, Pranab Mukherji, Kamlapati Tripathi, A.P. Sharma, and Buta Singh stayed with Indira Gandhi. Protesting the arrest of Indira Gandhi by the Janata Party government in 1978, Virendra Verma led 1200 satyagrahis, courted arrest and was lodged in the Muzaffarnagar district jail twice.

Additional positions and memberships held include: Vice President of the U.P. Sugarcane Co-operative Union Federation, (1949–1955), member of the Indian Central Sugarcane Committee & UP-Bihar Sugarcane Board (1952–1955), member of the State Transport Authority (1957–1959), chairman of the Indian Sugarcane Development Council (1967–1975), head of the U.P. Sugar Mills Nationalization Committee (1970), member of the U.P. Legislative Assembly (1952–1962, 1967, 1969–1977), chairman of the Public Undertakings Committee U.P. (1973–1975), Deputy Minister of Co-operatives in UP (1959–1960), Cabinet Minister in U.P. ministries of Irrigation, Power, Industries, Labor, Education, Technical Education and Home (1970–1971), Agriculture Minister of U.P. (1975–1977), Lok Dal party leader in the Rajya Sabha M.P. (April 1984 – 1988), member of Committee on Privilege in the Rajya Sabha (1984), member of the Joint Select Committees of parliament on the Lok Pal Bill (1985) and the Indian Medical Council Bill (1987), Rashtriya Lok Dal Vice President (1987–1988), Deputy Leader of the Janata Dal and National Front parliamentary party in the Rajya Sabha (1988–1990), and returned upon re-election to the Rajya Sabha (1990).

Virendra Verma was appointed the Governor of Punjab and Administrator of the Union Territory of Chandigarh on 14 June 1990. He took over as Governor of Himachal Pradesh on 19 December 1990. He was a member of the 12th Lok Sabha from Kairana Lok Sabha constituency (1998 - 1999).

== Political offices ==
- 1948-1952 President, District Board, Muzaffarnagar, Uttar Pradesh
- 1949-1955 Vice President, U.P. Sugarcane Co-operative Union Federation
- 1950-1959 President, District Congress Committee, Muzaffarnagar
- 1950-1980 Member, All India Congress Committee
- 1952-1955 Member, Indian Central Sugarcane Committee & UP-Bihar Sugarcane Board
- 1952-1962 Member, Uttar Pradesh Legislative Assembly (First Term)
- 1957-1959 Member, State Transport Authority
- 1959-1960 Deputy Minister, Co-operatives, Uttar Pradesh
- 1960-1967 Member, Executive Council, Indian National Congress (I.N.C.), Uttar Pradesh
- 1967 Member, Uttar Pradesh Legislative Assembly (Second Term)
- 1967-1975 Chairman, Indian Sugarcane Development Council
- 1969-1977 Member, Uttar Pradesh Legislative Assembly (Third Term)
- 1970 Head, U.P. Sugar Mills Nationalization Committee
- 1970-1971 Cabinet Minister, Irrigation, Power, Industries, Labour, Education and Technical Education and Home Departments
- 1973-1975 Chairman, Public Undertakings Committee
- 1975-1977 Cabinet Minister, Agriculture, Uttar Pradesh
- 1977-1980 Member, Congress Working Committee
- 1984-1990 Member, Rajya Sabha (First Term)
- 1984-1988 Leader, Lok Dal Parliamentary Party, Rajya Sabha
- 1984 Member, General Purposes Committee
- 1984-1985 Member, Committee of Privileges (First Term)
- 1985 Member, Joint Committee of Parliament on Lok Pal Bill
- 1987 Member, Joint Committee of Parliament on Indian Medical Council Bill
- 1987-1990 Vice President, Rashtriya Lok Dal
- 1988-1990 Deputy Leader, Janata Dal (J.D.) Parliamentary Party, Rajya Sabha
- 1988 Member, Committee of Privileges (Second Term)
- 1990 Member, Rajya Sabha (Second Term)
- 1990 Governor, Punjab
- 1990 Administrator, Union Territory of Chandigarh
- 1990-1993 Governor, Himachal Pradesh
- 1998-1999 Member, 12th Lok Sabha
- 1998-1999 Member, Committee on Agriculture
- 1998-1999 Member, Consultative Committee, Ministry of Food and Consumer Affairs
