= B. K. N. Chhibber =

Indian military veteran (born 1936)

Lieutenant General Bakshi Krishan Nath Chhibber (born 10 February 1936) is an Indian military veteran who has also served as Administrator of Chandigarh and Governor of Punjab from 18 September 1994 to 27 November 1999. As member of the 9th Gorkha Rifles he received all the three Peacetime distinguished service awards of Param Vishisht Seva Medal, Ati Vishisht Seva Medal and Vishisht Seva Medal.

== Personal life ==
Bakshi Krishan Nath Chhibber was born on 10 February 1936 in Lahore Punjab Province of British India (present day Punjab, Pakistan) into the Chhibber clan of Mohyal Brahmins. His family migrated to present day-India in 1947 post the partition. He was married to Rama Chhibber who died in January 2018 at the age of 78. They have a son and a daughter.

== Career ==
Chhibber graduated from Indian Military Academy, Dehradun in December 1956 and later joined the Gorkha Rifles. He also served as defence advisor to Royal Bhutan Army from August 1964 to December 1967 and was honoured with the Ugen Thogyal Medal by Bhutan for his services in 1967.

Chhibber had also contested the 2009 Indian general election from Amritsar representing Bahujan Samaj Party but lost to Bharatiya Janata Party's cricketer turned politician Navjot Singh Sidhu.
