= Surendra Nath =

Indian politician (1926–1994)

Surendra Nath (1926 – 9 July 1994) was the Governor of Punjab from August 1991 to July 1994. He also held additional charge as the Governor of Himachal Pradesh from November 1993 to July 1994. He was a career Indian Police Service officer. He died on 9 July 1994 when the plane he was travelling on crashed in Mandi district. His father was Mahashe Rajpal, publisher of Rangila Rasul.
