= 2026 in India =

- Centuries: 19th; 20th; 21st
- Decades: 2000s; 2010s; 2020s
- See also: List of years in India; Timeline of Indian history

The following is a list of events for the year 2026 in India.

== Incumbents ==
=== National office bearers ===
Position	Portrait	Name	Since
President of India		Droupadi Murmu (Age 68)	25 July 2022
Vice President of India/ Chairman of the Rajya Sabha		C. P. Radhakrishnan (Age 69)	12 September 2025
Prime Minister of India		Narendra Modi (Age 76)	26 May 2014
Chief Justice of India		Surya Kant (Age 64)	24 November 2025
Speaker of the Lok Sabha		Om Birla (Age 63)	19 June 2019
Deputy Chairman of the Rajya Sabha		Harivansh Narayan Singh (Age 70)	9 August 2018
Chief Election Commissioner of India		Gyanesh Kumar (Age 62)	19 February 2025
Chief of Defence Staff		N. S. Raja Subramani (Age 61)	31 May 2026
Governor of Reserve Bank of India		Sanjay Malhotra (Age 58)	11 December 2024
Lok Sabha		18th Lok Sabha	24 June 2024

=== State governments ===
State	Governor	Chief Minister	Political Party	Political alliance	Chief Justice
Andhra Pradesh	S. Abdul Nazeer	N. Chandrababu Naidu	TDP	N.D.A.	Lisa Gill
Arunachal Pradesh	Kaiwalya Trivikram Parnaik	Pema Khandu	BJP	N.D.A.	Vijay Bishnoi
Assam	Lakshman Prasad Acharya	Himanta Biswa Sarma	BJP	N.D.A.	Vijay Bishnoi
Bihar	Syed Ata Hasnain	Samrat Choudhary	BJP	N.D.A.	K. Vinod Chandran
Chhattisgarh	Ramen Deka	Vishnu Deo Sai	BJP	N.D.A.	Ramesh Sinha
Goa	Ashok Gajapathi Raju	Pramod Sawant	BJP	N.D.A.	Devendra Kumar Upadhyaya
Gujarat	Acharya Dev Vrat	Bhupendrabhai Patel	BJP	N.D.A.	Sunita Agarwal
Haryana	Ashim Kumar Ghosh	Nayab Singh Saini	BJP	N.D.A.	Sheel Nagu
Himachal Pradesh	Kavinder Gupta	Sukhvinder Singh Sukhu	INC	I.N.D.I.A	Gurmeet Singh Sandhawalia
Jharkhand	Santosh Kumar Gangwar	Hemant Soren	JMM	I.N.D.I.A	M. S. Sonak
Karnataka	Thawar Chand Gehlot	D. K. Shivakumar	INC	I.N.D.I.A	Nilay Vipinchandra Anjaria
Keralam	Om Prakash Mathur	V. D. Satheesan	INC	I.N.D.I.A	Nitin Madhukar Jamdar
Madhya Pradesh	Mangubhai Patel	Mohan Yadav	BJP	N.D.A.	Suresh Kumar Kait
Maharashtra	Jishnu Dev Varma	Devendra Fadnavis	BJP	N.D.A.	Devendra Kumar Upadhyaya
Manipur	Ajay Kumar Bhalla	Yumnam Khemchand Singh	BJP	N.D.A.	Siddharth Mridul
Meghalaya	C. H. Vijayashankar	Conrad Sangma	NPP	N.D.A.	S. Vaidyanathan
Mizoram	V. K. Singh	Lalduhoma	ZPM	Regional	Vijay Bishnoi
Nagaland	Nand Kishore Yadav	Neiphiu Rio	NPF	N.D.A.	Vijay Bishnoi
Odisha	Kambhampati Hari Babu	Mohan Charan Majhi	BJP	N.D.A.	Harish Tandon
Punjab	Gulab Chand Kataria	Bhagwant Mann	AAP	Regional	Sheel Nagu
Rajasthan	Haribhau Kisanrau Bagde	Bhajan Lal Sharma	BJP	N.D.A.	Manindra Mohan Shrivastava
Sikkim	Dushyant Kumar Gautam	Prem Singh Tamang	SKM	N.D.A.	Biswanath Somadder
Tamil Nadu	Rajendra Arlekar	Vijay	TVK	I.N.D.I.A	Sanjay V. Gangapurwala
Telangana	Shiv Pratap Shukla	Revanth Reddy	INC	I.N.D.I.A	Alok Aradhe
Tripura	N. Indrasena Reddy	Manik Saha	BJP	N.D.A.	M. S. Ramachandra Rao
Uttar Pradesh	Anandiben Patel	Yogi Adityanath	BJP	N.D.A.	Arun Bhansali
Uttarakhand	Gurmit Singh	Pushkar Singh Dhami	BJP	N.D.A.	Manoj Kumar Gupta
West Bengal	R. N. Ravi	Suvendu Adhikari	BJP	N.D.A.	Tapabrata Chakraborty (acting)

=== Union territory governments ===
State	Lieutenant governor and Administrators	Chief Minister	Party	Political alliance	Chief Justice
Andaman and Nicobar Islands	Devendra Kumar Joshi (Lieutenant governor)	✗	✗	✗	Tapabrata Chakraborty (acting)(Calcutta High Court)
Chandigarh	Gulab Chand Kataria (Administrators)	✗	✗	✗	Sheel Nagu (Punjab and Haryana High Court)
Dadra and Nagar Haveli and Daman and Diu	Praful Khoda Patel (Administrators)	✗	✗	✗	Alok Aradhe (Bombay High Court)
Delhi	Taranjit Singh Sandhu (Lieutenant governor)	Rekha Gupta	BJP	N.D.A.	Devendra Kumar Upadhyaya (Delhi High Court)
Jammu and Kashmir	Manoj Sinha (Lieutenant governor)	Omar Abdullah	JKNC	I.N.D.I.A	Arun Palli (High Court of Jammu and Kashmir and Ladakh)
Ladakh	Vinai Kumar Saxena (Lieutenant governor)	✗	✗	✗	Arun Palli (High Court of Jammu and Kashmir and Ladakh)
Lakshadweep	Praful Khoda Patel (Administrators) (additional charge)	✗	✗	✗	Nitin Madhukar Jamdar (Kerala High Court)
Puducherry	Kuniyil Kailashnathan (Lieutenant governor)	N. Rangaswamy	AINRC	N.D.A.	Kalpathi Rajendran Shriram (Madras High Court)

== Events ==
=== January ===
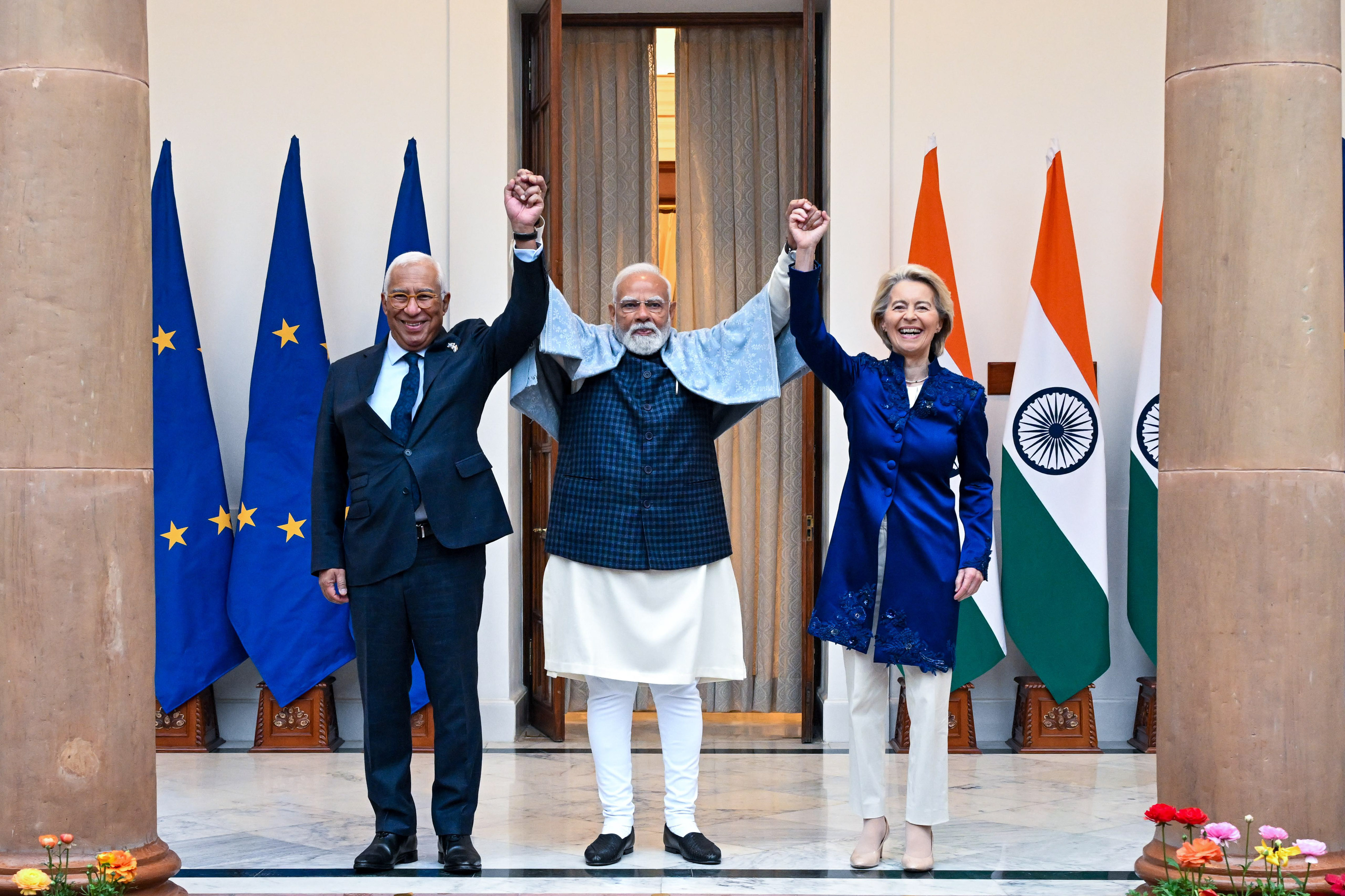
António Costa, Narendra Modi and Ursula von der Leyen at the India–EU Summit on 27 January 2026, after signing the India–European Union Free Trade Agreement.

- 2 January – At least 14 people die and several people are hospitalised after drinking contaminated water in Indore, Madhya Pradesh.
- 5 January – A magnitude 5.1 earthquake hits Assam, injuring three people.
- 9 January –
  - Fourteen people are killed and over 30 others are injured when a bus falls into a gorge near Nahan, Himachal Pradesh.
  - At least 20 people are reported killed after being attacked by a single wild elephant roaming the forests of West Singhbhum district, Jharkhand since 1 January.
- 19 January –
  - Nitin Nabin is elected as the National President of the Bharatiya Janata Party.
  - At least nine people are killed and 80 others are injured when a bus overturns in Latehar, Jharkhand.
- 20 January – At least two people are killed in clashes after a youth's murder in Kokrajhar, Assam.
- 21 January –
  - An outbreak of Nipah virus is reported in West Bengal, with at least two cases recorded in Barasat.
  - A Pipistrel Virus of the Indian Air Force crashes into a pond after an engine failure in Prayagraj, Uttar Pradesh. No injuries are reported.
- 22 January – A Casspir of the Indian Army falls into a gorge in Doda, Jammu and Kashmir, killing 10 soldiers and injuring 10 others.
- 24 January – A fire at a four-story building in Hyderabad, Telangana, kills six people.
- 26 January – Protests break out across the country over the UGC Bill 2026.
- 27 January – India and the European Union reach a free trade agreement.
- 28 January – 2026 Baramati Learjet 45 crash: Five people, including Maharashtra deputy chief minister, Ajit Pawar, are killed after a Learjet 45 crashes and explodes at Baramati Airport in Maharashtra.
- 29 January – The Supreme Court of India stays the implementation of the UGC Equity Regulations, 2026 citing misuse by specific groups.
- 30 January – At least 25 people are killed in a fire at a Wow! Momo restaurant in Kolkata.

=== February ===
- 2 February – US president Donald Trump announces a trade agreement with India that sees the reduction of US tariffs on Indian exports to 18% in exchange for India stopping purchases of Russian oil.
- 4 February – Yumnam Khemchand Singh takes oath as the Chief Minister of Manipur after President's rule ends in the state.
- 5 February – Eighteen people are killed in an explosion at an illegal coal mine in East Jaintia Hills district, Meghalaya.
- 7 February – 8 March – 2026 Men's T20 World Cup.
- 10 February – Six people are killed after a car collides with a truck in Dausa district, Rajasthan.
- 16–20 February – AI Impact Summit in New Delhi.
- 17 February – A woman and her infant child are burned to death by a mob after the former is accused of witchcraft in Kudsai, Jharkhand.
- 21 February – Brazil and India sign an agreement to strengthen cooperation on critical minerals and rare earth elements.
- 23 February – A Beechcraft C90 air ambulance operated by Redbird Airways crashes into a forest shortly after takeoff from Ranchi during a medical evacuation mission, killing all seven people on board.
- 27 February – A special court in Delhi discharges Arvind Kejriwal, Manish Sisodia, K. Kavitha and 22 others in the Delhi liquor scam case.
- 28 February – Twenty-one people are killed in an fireworks explosion in Vetlapalem village, Kakinada district, Andhra Pradesh.

=== March ===
- 1 March – At least 15 people are killed and 18 others are critically injured in an explosion at an explosives factory in Nagpur district, Maharashtra.
- 2 March – Prime Minister Narendra Modi and Canadian Prime Minister Mark Carney announce that Canada and India have agreed to a deal that would strengthen their economic partnership, in a move aimed at boosting ties after two years of strained relationship between the two countries.
- 4 March – The United States allows India to buy Russian oil until 4 April.
- 5 March –
  - Nitish Kumar announces his resignation as chief minister of Bihar to run in the 2026 Rajya Sabha elections.
  - An Su-30MKI fighter jet of the Indian Air Force crashes shortly after takeoff for a training flight in Karbi Anglong district, Assam, killing its two pilots.
- 7 March – The government allows the Iranian Navy vessel IRIS Lavan to dock in Kochi on humanitarian grounds amid the 2026 Iran war.
- 8 March – India beat New Zealand in the final match and win the 2026 Men's T20 World Cup in cricket.
- 11 March –
  - Farooq Abdullah, the former Chief Minister of Jammu and Kashmir, survives an assassination attempt in a marriage function in Jammu.
  - The Lok Sabha rejects a no confidence vote against speaker, Om Birla by a voice vote.
  - The Supreme Court rules in favor of removing life support from Harish Rana, who had been in a vegetative state following a fall in 2013, marking the first time that passive euthanasia has been allowed by an Indian court.
- 14 March – Sonam Wangchuk is released from jail after the government quashes the National Security Act (India) against him in aftermath of the Ladakh protests.
- 16 March – At least 10 patients are killed in a fire at SCB Medical College in Cuttack, Odisha.
- 18 March –
  - At least seven people are killed after a short circuit at an EV charging station in Indore.
  - At least nine people are killed in a building fire near Palam metro station in Delhi.
- 19 March – The Government of India constitutes the National Dental Commission (NDC), replacing the Dental Council of India established under the Dentists Act, 1948, to align dental education and regulation with global standards.
- 19–21 March – President Droupadi Murmu undertakes a three-day spiritual tour of Uttar Pradesh, visiting Ayodhya, Mathura and Vrindavan, where she offers prayers at the ISKCON Temple and Prem Mandir, Vrindavan.
- 23 March –
  - At least five people are killed and nine people are injured in a building collapse in Prayagraj, Uttar Pradesh.
  - A special court in Madurai convicts all nine police personnel involved in the 2020 Sathankulam custodial death case.
- March 2026 – India is awarded hosting rights for the 2028 World Athletics Indoor Championships, with Bhubaneswar selected as the host city, making India the fourth Asian nation to host the event.
- 24 March – A special NIA court sentences Kashmiri separatist Asiya Andrabi to life imprisonment for her involvement in terrorist activities in Kashmir.
- 25 March – At least 14 people are killed and 20 people are injured in a fire following a bus collision with a lorry in Markapuram district, Andhra Pradesh.
- 26 March – At least nine people are killed and around 30 others are injured when a bus collides with a truck and overturns in Chhindwara district, Madhya Pradesh.
- 27 March – Lawmakers from the Jammu & Kashmir National Conference protest outside the legislative assembly of Jammu and Kashmir, in solidarity with Iran and against the assassination of supreme leader Ali Khamenei amidst the Iran war. Additionally, a major confrontation breaks out between INC lawmaker Irfan Hafiz Lone and BJP lawmaker Yudhvir Sethi during the protest.
- 28 March – The Noida International Airport is inaugurated by Prime Minister Narendra Modi.
- 30 March – India says it has ended the Naxalite insurgency after home minister Amit Shah reported that most of the remaining Naxal fighters had been killed, arrested, or had surrendered following intensified security operations. These senior commanders swear to continue the armed struggle against the Indian state, saying that they are determined to continue fighting.
- 31 March – At least eight people are killed in a crowd crush in a temple in Nalanda, Bihar.

=== April ===
- 4 April – One person is killed and at least six others are reportedly trapped after a four-story hotel collapses in Anuppur, Madhya Pradesh.
- 6 April –
  - A special court in Madurai sentences all nine policemen accused in the 2020 Sathankulam custodial death case to death.
  - Telangana makes cancer a notifiable disease, and mandates one-month reporting timeline.
- 7 April – 2023 Manipur violence: Two people are killed and five others are injured in protests following a bombing that kills two children in Bishnupur, Manipur.
- 8 April – At least 60 people are injured in clashes between police and tribal villagers over a bauxite mining project in Rayagada district, Odisha.
- 9 April –
  - 2026 Assam Legislative Assembly election: The BJP retains its majority in the Assam Legislative Assembly.
  - 2026 Kerala Legislative Assembly election: The UDF wins a majority of seats in the Kerala Legislative Assembly.
  - 2026 Puducherry Legislative Assembly election
  - 2026 Noida workers protest
- 10 April – At least 10 people are killed after a boat capsizes in the Yamuna river near Mathura, Uttar Pradesh.
- 11 April –
  - The India-flagged LPG gas tanker Jag Vikram crosses the Strait of Hormuz, becoming the first Indian vessel to cross the Hormuz since the Iran war ceasefire. It is expected to arrive in Mumbai on 15 April.
  - A bus crashes into two trucks in Katihar district, Bihar, killing 13 people and injuring 30 others.
- 13 April – A cement mixer truck collides with a van in Thane district, Maharashtra, killing 11 people.
- 14 April –
  - Nitish Kumar resigns as the Chief Minister of Bihar with Samrat Choudhary succeeding him.
  - 2026 Manipur bombing: At least 18 people are injured in violent protests against the killing of two children in a bomb blast in Manipur.
  - Thirteen people are killed in a boiler explosion at a power plant in Sakti district, Chhattisgarh.
  - The Uttar Pradesh government announces increase in wages of some workers following the 2026 Noida workers protest.
- 17 April – The Delimitation Bill, 2026 and the Constitution (131st Amendment) Bill, 2026 proposing the increase in Lok Sabha seats from 543 to 850 to implement Women's Reservation Bill fails to pass in the Parliament of India due to a lack of a two third majority in the Lok Sabha.
- 19 April – At least 23 people are killed and six others are injured in an explosion at a firecrackers factory in Virudhunagar, Tamil Nadu.
- 20 April – A bus falls into a gorge in Udhampur, Jammu and Kashmir, killing 21 people and injuring 45 others.
- 21 April – At least 13 people are killed and more than 40 people are injured in an explosion at a firecrackers unit in Thrissur, Kerala.
- 23 April – 2026 Tamil Nadu Legislative Assembly election: The TVK emerges as the single largest party in the Tamil Nadu Legislative Assembly.
- 23–29 April – 2026 West Bengal Legislative Assembly election: The BJP wins a landslide majority of seats in the West Bengal Legislative Assembly.
- 28 April – The New Zealand–India Free Trade Agreement is signed in New Delhi.
- 30 April – A boat operated by the Madhya Pradesh Tourism Development Corporation capsizes in Bargi Dam, killing 13 people.

=== May ===
- 9 May – Suvendu Adhikari is inaugurated as Chief Minister of West Bengal.
- 10 May – Vijay takes oath as the Chief Minister of Tamil Nadu.
- 12 May – The National Testing Agency orders the cancellation of the 2026 National Eligibility cum Entrance Test (Undergraduate) held on 3 May, citing a leakage of test questions.
- 13 May –
  - 2026 CBSE On-Screen Marking controversy: A controversy erupts against the CBSE due to the introduction of the on-screen marking system for the Grade 12 board examinations.
  - At least 96 people are killed in rainstorms across Uttar Pradesh.
- 14 May – V. D. Satheesan is elected as the Chief Minister of Kerala.
- 16 May – The Cockroach Janta Party is founded by Abhijeet Dipke in response to the comments made by Chief Justice of India, Surya Kant who called unemployed youths as "cockroaches" and "parasites".
- 18 May — A truck collides with a passenger van in Lakhimpur Kheri district, Uttar Pradesh, killing 10 people.
- 19 May — A trailer truck crashes into a wedding minitruck in Palghar district, Maharashtra, killing 13 people and injuring 25.
- 27 May – The Supreme Court of India upholds the constitutional validity of the Special Intensive Revision in a landmark verdict.
- 28 May — D. K. Shivakumar is selected as the new Chief Minister of Karnataka replacing Siddaramaiah.

=== June ===
- 3 June – At least 21 people are killed in a fire at a hotel in New Delhi.
- 6 June – 2026 Delhi Jantar Mantar protests: The Cockroach Janta Party led by Abhijeet Dipke stages protests at Jantar Mantar demanding the resignation of Education Minister Dharmendra Pradhan over the 2026 NEET controversy.
- 13 June – An Antonov An-32 of the Indian Air Force crash-lands at Jorhat Air Force Station in Assam, killing five of the six occupants on board.
- 15 June –
  - The Defence Research and Development Organisation (DRDO) successfully conducts the flight-test of the Long Range Land Attack Cruise Missile (LRLACM) from Abdul Kalam Island in Odisha.
  - The LNG carrier Disha safely transits through the Strait of Hormuz, becoming the first Indian-flagged LNG carrying vessel to exit the war zone in more than three months.
- 16 June –
  - The Ministry of Electronics and Information Technology starts blocking Telegram in India until 22 June and issues a direction to the messaging platform to disable the message editing feature in India until 30 June.
  - Delhi Police arrest seven operatives of a Pakistan-backed international terror-crime syndicate involved in smuggling illegal arms, ammunition and narcotics from Pakistan into Delhi-NCR.
- 21 June – An ammonia gas leak in Tiruvallur district, Tamil Nadu, leaves 18 people dead.
- 22 June – At least 15 people are killed in a fire at a coaching centre in Lucknow.
- 27 June –
  - An investigation by The Indian Express reveals that Union minister Bhagirath Choudhary received ₹99 lakh (US$110,000) as subsidy under his ministry for his commercial cucumber farm. Choudhary rejects the allegations and says that there was nothing irregular about availing the subsidy as he had engaged in farming long before entering politics.
  - The National Investigation Agency (NIA) charges three more accused people from Jammu and Kashmir in connection with the 2025 Delhi car explosion.
  - The Maharashtra State Council of Examination postpones the Maharashtra Teacher Eligibility Test (TET 2026) which was scheduled to begin on 28 June after suspicion of paper leak.
- 28 June – Sonam Wangchuk goes on an indefinite hunger strike in protests demanding the resignation of education minister, Dharmendra Pradhan over the 2026 NEET controversy.
- 30 June –
  - General Dhiraj Seth takes charge as the Chief of the Army Staff.
  - Lok Sabha MP K. C. Venugopal moves a privilege notice against Defence Minister Rajnath Singh accusing him of misleading the Parliament of casualties of Operation Sindoor.
  - The government of Tamil Nadu moves the Supreme Court against the order of Madras High Court imposing a ban of slaughter of cows in Tamil Nadu.
  - The Central Bureau of Investigation (CBI) arrests Indian Administrative Service (IAS) officer Pradeep Kumar and two former bank officials in connection with the alleged misappropriation of ₹504 crore (US$54 million) belonging to the government of Haryana.
  - A fire at a petrochemical plant in Purba Medinipur district, West Bengal, injures at least 20 people.

=== July ===
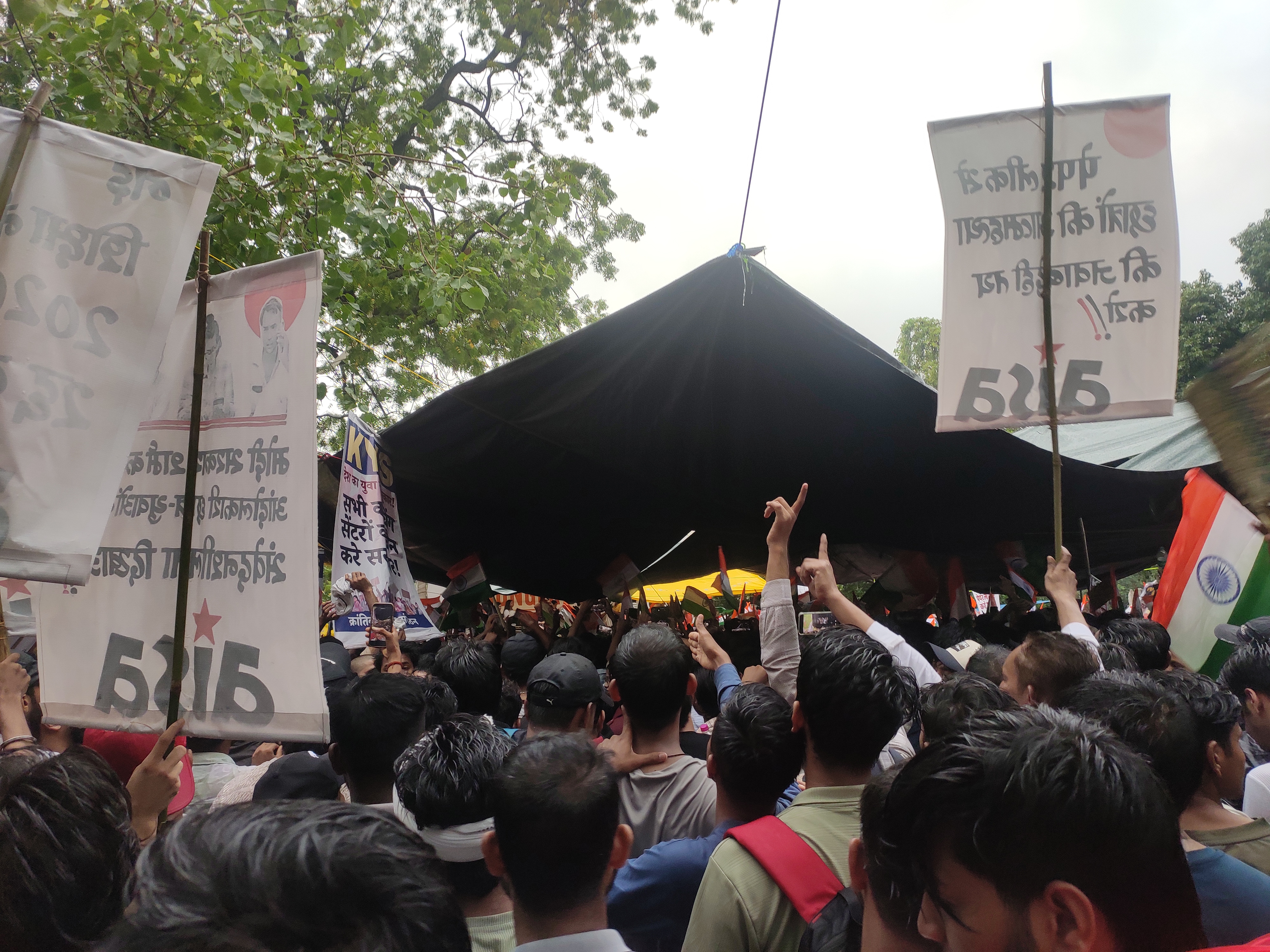
Students protesting over the 2026 NEET-UG paper leak at Jantar Mantar, New Delhi, 20 July 2026

- 1 July –
  - The VB G RAM G law comes into effect replacing MGNREGA.
  - Air Marshal Ashutosh Dixit takes charge as the Vice Chief of Air Staff.
- 2 July - Bank of Baroda informs stock exchanges about paying Rs. 5700 crores (600 million USD) to settle NMC Health related disputes at Abu Dhabi Global Market.
- 4 July –
  - India designates 23 Pakistan-backed Jaish-e-Mohammed (JeM) and Lashkar-e-Taiba (LeT) operatives including three close associates of LeT founder Hafiz Saeed as terrorists.
  - Rajya Sabha MP John Brittas writes to Home Minister Amit Shah urging the government to reconsider its position to keep the Shri Ram Janmbhoomi Teerth Kshetra out of the Right to Information Act, 2005, citing the need for transparency and accountability.
- 5 July – Union Agriculture and Rural Development Minister Shivraj Singh Chouhan releases the first instalment of ₹25,863 crore (US$2.8 billion) to states for the implementation of the VB-G RAM-G scheme.
- 6 July –
  - India hosts BRICS India 2026.
  - The NIA files a chargesheet against LeT founder Hafiz Saeed on the 2025 Pahalgam attack.
  - Madhya Pradesh Chief Minister Mohan Yadav reconstitutes the State's Waqf Board and includes two Hindus in the Waqf board, making Madhya Pradesh the first state in the country to reorganise the Waqf Board under the Waqf (Amendment) Act, 2025.
- 7 July – The Gujarat High Court upholds the conviction of 49 accused (38 death sentences and 11 life imprisonments) in the 2008 Ahmedabad bombings.
- 8 July – A magnitude 4.2 earthquake hits Maharashtra, damaging 105 houses.
- 9 July – India and Australia sign a defence and uranium export agreement.
- 19 July – 2026 Assam floods.
- 20 July –
  - The Cockroach Janta Party organises the Sansad Chalo March demanding the resignation of Education Minister Dharmendra Pradhan over the 2026 NEET controversy.
  - A magnitude 2.6 earthquake hits Kerala, damaging 20 houses.
  - Twenty-five workers are killed in a collapse at an under-construction hydroelectric tunnel in Sikkim blamed on a methane gas explosion.
- 21 July –
  - India summons Russian charge d'affaires (CDA) Vladmir Ladanov over the killing of four Indian seafarers aboard the MV Golden Leo in Odesa, Ukraine.
  - The Supreme Court directs the Director of All India Institutes of Medical Sciences (AIIMS) to constitute a medical board to examine the health of convicted godman Asaram who sought an interim bail on medical grounds.
  - 2026 Delhi Jantar Mantar protests
    - Leader of the Opposition Rahul Gandhi meets Lok Sabha Speaker Om Birla and urges him to allow a discussion in the Lok Sabha regarding the attack against students during CJP protest.
    - Congress leaders including Rahul Gandhi, Priyanka Gandhi, Karnataka Chief Minister D. K. Shivakumar and Kerala Chief Minister V. D. Satheesan protest outside Prime Minister Narendra Modi's residence at 7, Race Course Road demanding his resignation over the police attack against students in Delhi. Delhi Police forecfully remove and detain Rahul Gandhi, Priyanka Gandhi and Akhilesh Yadav from the protest site.
- 22 July –
  - Lok Sabha suspends Trinamool Congress MP Kalyan Banerjee for abusing two women MPs. Opposition MPs including K. C. Venugopal, Dharmendra Yadav and Mahua Moitra meet Lok Sabha Speaker Om Birla seeking the withdrawal of his suspension saying that altercation for which he was suspended occurred after the House was adjourned.
  - Mumbai Police detain over 300 people near Chaitya Bhoomi in Dadar, Mumbai who had gathered to demand the resignation of Education Minister, Dharmendra Pradhan.
  - 2026 Delhi Jantar Mantar protests
    - Chief Justice Surya Kant refuses to examine the videos of police brutality against protesters by the Delhi Police during the Sansad Chalo March saying that the court does not want to waste its time.
    - Sonam Wangchuk writes to Union Ministers J. P. Nadda and Jitendra Singh Rana saying that he would end his fast if the Centre promises to not take any action against the students who protested against alleged examination irregularities.
- 23 July –
  - The Supreme Court permits Taj Trapezium Zone Authority to process pending applications for the establishment of non polluting Micro, Small and Medium Enterprises (MSME) within the Taj Trapezium Zone.
  - Prime Minister Modi announces that the Union Cabinet will take up a draft bill which contains provisions for Fast-Track courts and strict punishments against those involved in paper leaks.
  - 2026 Delhi Jantar Mantar protests: Sonam Wangchuk ends his 26-day hunger strike citing long negotiations on various conditions and possible violence.
- 24 July – The United States imposes a 10% tariff on India, citing the presence of alleged forced labour in the supply chain.
- 25 July –
  - Dharmendra Pradhan resigns as Education Minister amid outrage over the 2026 NEET controversy. He is replaced by Pralhad Joshi.
  - The ancient Buddhist site of Sarnath is designated as a UNESCO World Heritage Site.
- 29 July – 2026 Jharkhand student protests.
- 30 July –
  - Parliament passes the Anti Paper Leak Bill 2026 by a voice vote amid outrage over police brutality during the 2026 Delhi Jantar Mantar protests.
  - Bank of Baroda that has written off loans above 100 crores amounting to a total of Rs.35,715 crores refuses to disclose details of large defaulters who received haircut citing exemptions under Right to Information Act, 2005.
- 31 July –
  - Lok Sabha passes the Registration of Births and Deaths (Amendment) Bill, 2026, without debate amid protest by the Opposition over police crackdown on students during the Sansad Chalo march.
  - Lok Sabha MP K. C. Venugopal moves a privilege notice against Union Minister Jitendra Singh Rana over his remarks that no firing took place during the Sansad Chalo march.
  - Varsha Ashok Aglawe assumes charge as the 54th director general of the Geological Survey of India, becoming the first woman to hold the position.
  - Former Aam Aadmi Party (AAP) councillor Tahir Hussain is sentenced to life imprisonment for the murder of Intelligence Bureau officer Ankit Sharma during the 2020 Delhi riots.
  - At least 10 people are killed and many others are injured in a building collapse during a repair in Bhiwandi, Mumbai.

=== August ===
- 1 August –
  - Prime Minister Narendra Modi inaugurates Alluri Sitarama Raju International Airport at Bhogapuram in Andhra Pradesh.
  - Home Minister Amit Shah presents the Lokmanya Tilak National Award to National Security Advisor (NSA) Ajit Doval.
  - Eight people die across Kerala due to rain-related incidents.
- 3 August – Former Wrestling Federation of India president Brij Bhushan Sharan Singh is acquitted on charges of sexually assaulting three female athletes.
- 8 August – Hindutva Group conducts a purification ritual at Ramlila Maidan Haldwani after a rally by Mallikarjun Kharge.
- 13 August –
  - President Droupadi Murmu presents Sangeet Natak Akademi Fellowships and Awards for 2024 and 2025.
  - A landslide triggers a flashflood at an under-construction tunnel in Uttarakhand, killing seven people and injuring 13 others.
- 17 August – Seven people are killed in a crowd crush at the Ashokdham Temple in Lakhisarai district, Bihar.
- 18 August – 2026 Patna student protests
- 19 August – Nine people are killed in a hotel fire in Kolkata.
- 21 August – Indian National Space Promotion and Authorisation Centre head Pawan Goenka announces that ISRO is going to stop making launch vehicles and it will be done by private sector.
- 25 August – A National Company Law Tribunal special bench headed by Nileesh Sharma approves a repayment plan for Subhash Chandra, head of Zee Media Corporation where he will pay Rs. 6.5 crores against creditor claims of Rs. 22,006.57 crores.
- 26 August – Defense Minister Rajnath Singh permits the transfer of DRDO missile technologies to Indian private companies.

=== September ===
Indian Prime Minister Narendra Modi, Chinese President Xi Jinping and Russian President Vladimir Putin at the 18th BRICS summit in Bharat Mandapam, New Delhi, 12 September 2026

- 5 September – A special NIA court in Bastar convicts all 10 accused in the 2013 Naxal attack in Darbha valley. They are subsequently sentenced to death on 16 September.
- 6 September – A five-story building collapses in Delhi, killing seven.
- 8 September – Five baby orangutans are rescued from a forest in Balasore district, Odisha.
- 12–13 September – 18th BRICS summit in New Delhi.
- 15 September – A Pakistan Navy vessel collides with an Indian Navy vessel in the Arabian Sea, prompting diplomatic protests between both countries.
- 21 September – A 28-year-old man fatally shoots a teacher at a school before killing himself in Lakhimpur Kheri district, Uttar Pradesh.
- 23 September – Nine people are killed in a bus fire on the Yamuna Expressway in Greater Noida.
- 27 September – Riots break out at Lovely Professional University and surrounding areas in Punjab following rumours of a sexual assault on campus.
- 30 September –
  - Hashim Moosa, a top Lashkar-e-Taiba commander and the mastermind of the 2025 Pahalgam attack is killed in an encounter with security forces in Budgam, Jammu and Kashmir.
  - Eight people are injured and one is killed in a major fire at the Mangalore Refinery and Petrochemicals Limited (MRPL) facility in Karnataka.

=== October ===
- 3 October – Five people are killed in an explosion at a facility in Sri City, Tirupati district, Andhra Pradesh.
- 10 October –
  - The central government places Delhi under lockdown ahead of the 2026 anti-CEC protests.
  - The NIA launches a case to investigate the attempted hijacking of Flydubai Flight 1073.
- 13 October – A boat capsizes in Vaishali district, Bihar, killing 13 people.
- 17 October –
  - A minibus falls into a 15-foot-deep drain on the Delhi–Mumbai Expressway in Kota district, Rajasthan, killing eight people and injuring 15 others.
  - A crowd crush at a puja pandal in Kolkata kills 19 people.
  - A coalition of left-wing civil rights groups, including the National Federation of Indian Women (NFIW) and the All India Democratic Women's Association (AIDWA), marches to the Delhi Police Headquarters, and delivered a formal memorandum calling for the immediate suspension and prosecution of officers implicated in the alleged physical and sexual assaults during the 2026 anti-CEC protests.
- 18 October – Fifteen people are killed and 29 others are injured after a truck plows into a crowd of pilgrims in Gwalior district, Madhya Pradesh.
- 19 October – Manipur conflict (2023–present): Three people are killed and four others are injured during clashes in Manipur.
- 20 October – The New Zealand–India Free Trade Agreement comes into effect.
- 21 October – A private bus falls into a nearly 100-foot-deep gorge in Kashmir, killing two people and injuring around 15 others.
- 22 October – A bus crashes into a tree in Manendragarh-Chirmiri-Bharatpur district, Chhattisgarh, killing six people and injuring 40 others.
- 23 October – Seven people are killed while two others are seriously injured in a house explosion in Siwan district, Bihar.
- 25 October – The International Weightlifting Federation awards the hosting rights for the 2029 World Weightlifting Championships to Ahmedabad.
- 26 October –
  - Seventeen inmates escape from a prison in Theni district, Tamil Nadu. All are recaptured after two days.
  - Six people are shot, five of them fatally, at a hotel in Guwahati, Assam.
- 28 October – 2026 North Indian Ocean cyclone season: Three people are killed as Cyclone Arnab makes landfall in Andhra Pradesh.
- 30 October –
  - A helicopter crashes in Chamoli district, Uttarakhand, leaving six people missing.
  - A massive fire at a shoe factory in Delhi kills four people and leaves two others injured.
- 31 October – Two girls are injured in a chainsaw attack at a school in Raptadu, Andhra Pradesh.

=== November ===
- 1 November – Four workers die of suffocation after entering a food waste tank at a hotel in Ujjain, Madhya Pradesh.
- 2 November –
  - A trailer collides with a van in Kushinagar, Uttar Pradesh, killing six people and seriously injuring two others.
  - Eight people die after being electrocuted when a vehicle comes into contact with a high-voltage power line in Jhunjhunu district, Rajasthan.
- 4 November – The US imposes new sanctions on companies and individuals in India with ties to the Iranian regime.
- 5 November –
  - A speeding truck rams into a crowd in Khunti district, Jharkhand, killing four women and three children.
  - A building collapses in Central Delhi district, Delhi, killing six people.
- 11 November –
  - Five carriages and the engine of a passenger train operating from Kolkata to Sairang derail near Digaru railway station in Assam.
  - 2026 Kulgam attack: Three CRPF jawans are injured in an attack by terrorists at a checkpoint in Kulgam.
  - Four family members drown in a Bikaner water tank after two older brothers and a cousin, including a 16-year-old boy, tried to save a 14-year-old girl who had slipped and fallen in.
- 13 November –
  - A gun attack in Taphou Kuki, Kangpokpi district, kills a woman and injures two men.
  - A bus collides with a truck near Kaziranga National Park in Assam, killing 24 people and injuring 11 others.
- 17 November –
  - A passenger bus plunges into a 100-metre-deep gorge near Gular Bazar in Tehri Garhwal, killing eight people and injuring 26 others.
  - A Border Security Force personnel who accidentally crossed the unfenced Bangladesh–India border in Meghalaya is briefly detained by Border Guard Bangladesh personnel and returns safely to India later that evening following a flag meeting between officials from both sides.
- 18 November – Mohammed Lateef Bhat, a local Lashkar-e-Taiba commander wanted for the 2026 Kulgam attack is killed in an encounter with security forces near a mosque in Kulgam.
- 21 November – At least 11 people die while more than 180 others are hospitalised after drinking adulterated alcohol in Manipur.

=== Multiple dates ===
- April – June – October – 2026 Rajya Sabha elections.

== Deaths ==
- 2 January –
  - Shyam Bihari Lal, 60, Uttar Pradesh MLA (since 2017).
  - Ashok Gajanan Modak, 85, Maharashtra MLC (1994–2006) and academic.
- 4 January –
  - L. Ganesan, 91, MP (1980-1986, 2004-2009).
  - Jitamitra Prasad Singh Deo, 79, historian and archaeologist.
- 6 January –
  - Suresh Kalmadi, 81, MP (1982–2014) and president of the IOA (1996–2011) and sports administrator.
  - V. K. Ebrahimkunju, 73, Kerala MLA (2011–2021).
- 7 January –
  - Madhav Gadgil, 83, ecologist.
  - Kabindra Purkayastha, 94, MP (1991–2014).
- 8 January –
  - Vijay Singh Gond, 68, Uttar Pradesh MLA (1980–2007, since 2024).
  - Meinam Bhorot Singh, 75, Manipur MLA (2002–2007).
  - Khawlhring Lalremruata, 38, cricketer (Mizoram).
- 10 January – Davinder Singh, 73, field hockey player, Olympic champion (1980).
- 11 January –
  - Prashant Tamang, 43, singer (Indian Idol) and actor (Paatal Lok).
  - Samir Putatundu, 73, politician.
- 12 January – Jayashree Kabir, 73, actress (Pratidwandi, Simana Periye, Rupali Saikate).
- 13 January –
  - Indira Devi Dhanrajgir, 95, poet and socialite.
  - Bir Bhadra Hagjer, 75, Assam MLA (2016–2021).
- 16 January – Bheemanna Khandre, 100, Karnataka MLA (1962–1972, 1978–1985).
- 18 January – Raj K. Purohit, 70, Maharashtra MLA (1990-2009, 2014-2019).
- 25 January –
  - Sir Mark Tully, 90, journalist (BBC).
  - Dominic Kokkat, 93, Syro-Malabar Catholic prelate, bishop of Gorakhpur (1984–2006).
- 28 January – Ajit Pawar, 66, deputy chief minister of Maharashtra (since 2024).
- 19 February – Ricky A. J. Syngkon, 54, MP (since 2024).
- 20 February – Vungzagin Valte, 61, Manipur MLA (since 2012).
- 23 February – Mukul Roy, 71, MP (2006–2017), minister of railways (2012), and West Bengal MLA (since 2021).
- 25 February – R. Nallakannu, 101, politician.
- 6 March – Govind Parmar, 72, Gujarat MLA (1995–2003, since 2017).
- 12 March – Harimurali, 27, actor (Rasikan, Amar Akbar Anthony, Annan Thampi).
- 29 March – Rahul Banerjee, 42, actor (Chirodini Tumi Je Amar, Pati Parameshwar, Zulfiqar).
- 3 April – Prashant Bose, 82, Maoist militant.
- 5 April – Mani Kumar Chetri, 105, cardiologist.
- 10 April – Sonam Wangchuk, 61, military officer.
- 12 April – Asha Bhosle, 92, playback singer.
- 22 April – N. Bhaskara Rao, 90, MP (1998–1999) and chief minister of Andhra Pradesh (1984).
- 5 May –
  - R. B. Choudary, 77, film producer (Pudhu Vasantham, Raja, Aanandham).
  - Santhosh K. Nayar, 65, actor (Nishedhi, Kurishuyudham, Vasantha Sena).
- 8 May – Ravi Pandit, 75, businessman.
- 10 May – D. Sudhakar, 66, Karnataka MLA (2004–2018, since 2023).
- 12 May – Swapan Sadhan Bose, 78, politician.
- 13 May – Dileep Raj, 47, actor
- 14 May – Sudhangshu Seal, 81, politician.
- 17 May – K. Rajan, 85, film producer (Doubles, Ninaikkatha Naalillai) and director (Unarchigal).
- 19 May – B. C. Khanduri, 91, Chief Minister of Uttarakhand (2007–2009, 2011–2012), minister of road transport and highways (2000–2004), and three-time MP.
- 27 May – Anik Dutta, 66, film director (Bhooter Bhabishyat, Ashchorjyo Prodeep, Meghnad Badh Rahasya).
- 28 May – S. Sathyendra, 65, actor
- 29 May – T. U. Kuruvilla, 89, politician.
- 30 May – K. P. Dhanapalan, 76, politician.
- 31 May –
  - Probal Dasgupta, 72, Esperantist, president of the Universal Esperanto Association (2007–2013)
  - Suman Kalyanpur, 89, singer
- 2 June – Yogesh Patel, 79, Gujarat MLA (since 2012)
- 6 June – Salim Kumar, 57, actor
- 10 June – Bharathiraja, 84, film director, screenwriter and actor
- 12 June – Jaspal Rana, 49, sport shooter and coach
- 27 June – K. Bhagyaraj, 73, actor and director.
- 28 June – Madan Mohan Lakhera, 88, army lieutenant general, governor of Mizoram (2006–2011), lieutenant governor of Andaman and Nicobar Islands (2006) and Puducherry (2004–2006).
- 30 June – P. A. Madhavan, 79, Kerala MLA (2011–2016).
- 4 July – Mohansinh Chhotubhai Rathava, 82, Gujarat MLA (1972–2002, since 2007).
- 11 July – S. Janaki, 88, singer
- 18 July – Chennamma Deve Gowda, 89, spouse of the prime minister (1996–1997).
- 19 July – Jennifer Monserrate, 56, Goa MLA (since 2012).
- 22 July – Alambadi, 90, Uttar Pradesh MLA (1996–2007, since 2012).
- 27 July – Susanta Singh, 53, Odisha MLA (since 2014).
- 4 August –
  - D. Y. Patil, 90, governor of Tripura (2009–2013), Bihar (2013–2014), and West Bengal (2014).
  - Pradeep Rawat, 74, actor (Mahabharat, Sye, Naayak).
- 5 August – Uma Shankar Singh, 55, Uttar Pradesh MLA (since 2012).
- 16 August – Asish Banerjee, 75, Deputy Speaker of West Bengal Legislative Assembly (2021-2026).
- 20 August – Sajjan Kumar, 80, Lok Sabha MP (1980-1984), (1991-1996), (2004-2009) and convicted murderer.
- 21 August – Sowcar Janaki, 94, Indian actress and Film Producer.
- 25 August – Kuku Kohli, 77, film director (Suhaag).
- 27 August –
  - T. K. D. Muzhappilangad, 80, writer.
  - Mamtaz Sanghamita, 80, Lok Sabha MP (2014-2019).
- 2 September – Anil Sharma, 63, Uttar Pradesh MLA (2002–2012, since 2017).
- 3 September – Harish Chandra Mishra, 67, judge, lokayukta of Delhi (since 2022).
- 6 September – Sudivya Kumar, 56, Jharkhand MLA (since 2019).
- 11 September – Solomon Pappaiah, 90, Indian scholar, actor, journalist and a television icon in Tamil Nadu.
- 13 September – Siddique Ahmed, 63, Assam MLA (2001–2016, since 2021).
- 14 September – Gopiram Bargayn Burabhakat, 103, sattriya classical dancer.
- 15 September – Alla Nani, 56, Andhra Pradesh MLA (2004–2014, since 2019) and deputy chief minister (2019–2022).
- 17 September – E. M. Sudarsana Natchiappan, 78, Rajya Sabha MP (2004-2016).
- 25 September – Mushtaq Khan, 56, actor (Welcome, Hum Hain Rahi Pyar Ke, Jodi No.1).
- 3 October –
  - Singeetham Srinivasa Rao, 95, film director (Aditya 369, Bhairava Dweepam, Pushpaka Vimana).
  - Mad Sandhu, LGBTQ social media influence and make-up artist.
- 4 October – Devprasad John Ganawa, 74, Roman Catholic prelate, bishop of Jhabua (2009–2012) and Udaipur (since 2012).
- 7 October –
  - Virjibhai Thummar, 67, Lok Sabha MP (2004-2009) and MLA (2017-2022).
  - Saeed-ur-Rahman Azmi Nadvi, 92, Islamic scholar, principal of Darul Uloom Nadwatul Ulama (since 2000)
- 8 October – Nana Patekar, 75, actor (Parinda, Tirangaa, Welcome).
- 11 October – Atar Singh Bhadana, 69, Rajasthan MLA (2003-2008).
- 13 October – Parvinder Singh Jhota, anti-drugs activist and kabaddi player.
- 14 October – Cheruvayal Raman, 74, tribal farmer.
- 17 October – Deva, 75, film composer (Manasukketha Maharasa, Vaigasi Poranthachu, Annaamalai).
- 18 October – B. Madhusoodhana Kurup, 71, fisheries researcher and academic administrator, vice-chancellor of KUFOS (since 2010).
- 19 October – Karthik Sabesh, 37, actor (Vallavan, Kulir 100°, Pattathu Yaanai).
- 25 October – Chef Damu, 72, chef (Cooku with Comali).
- 27 October –
  - Neeraj Yadav, 42, paralympian and javelin thrower.
  - B. P. Singh, 77, television producer and director (CID, Aahat, SuperCops Vs Super Villains).
- 30 October –
  - Domanlal Korsewada, 78, Chhattisgarh MLA (2008–2013, since 2023).
  - Ravindra Kishore Sinha, 75, founder of SIS Limited and MP (2014–2020).
  - Sanjay Gupta, 57, film director (Kaabil, Shootout at Lokhandwala, Jazbaa, Kaante).
- 3 November – Nand Lal, 78, Himachal Pradesh MLA (since 2007).
- 8 November – Jaswant Singh Yadav, 73, MP (1999–2004) and Rajasthan MLA (2008–2018, since 2023).
- 10 November – Bunker Roy, 81, educationist, founder of the Barefoot College.
- 11 November – Ujjal Biswas, 72, West Bengal MLA (2011–2026).
- 19 November – V. S. Babu, 75, Tamil Nadu MLA (2006–2011, since 2026).
- 20 November – Sapam Kunjakeswor Singh, 67, Manipur MLA (2007–2012, since 2022).
- 22 November – Ramrao Wadkute, 72, Rajya Sabha MP (since 2026).
