= WKL =

WKL may refer to:

- The World Kabaddi League, a defunct professional circle-style kabaddi league
- Weak Kőnig's lemma, the restriction of Kőnig's lemma to binary trees
  - WKL_{0}]], a related axiom system in reverse mathematics
- Wolters Kluwer, an American and Dutch information services company
- World Kiteboarding League
- Wish Ko Lang!, a Philippine public service drama anthology
