= Sair Sapata =

Sair Sapata is a tourism and entertainment complex situated on the banks of the Upper Lake in Bhopal. Developed by the Madhya Pradesh State Tourism Development Corporation, it is spread over an area of 24.56 acres, and was inaugurated on 29 September 2011 by State Chief Minister. Aimed at promoting tourism, the complex has attractions like musical fountain, two acres of children’s play area, toy train and a suspension bridge, among other things.

== Overview ==
Situated on the banks of the Upper Lake at Sewaniya Guar, Prempura, Bhadbhada-Van Vihar Road, the project was started with bhumi pujan on 27 May 2008, and it took three years to complete at the cost of ₹103.7 million (US$1.2 million). It was inaugurated on 29 September 2011 by State Chief Minister, Shivraj Singh Chouhan.

As a part of the project a suspension bridge was also built, which connects Prempura and Sewania. This bridge is built along the lines of the Lachman Jhula in Rishikesh. It is the main attraction of Sair Sapata and is 183.20 m long and 3.6 m wide. The bridge is built of RCC deck slabs and is believed to be the first pedestrian bridge in India to be built this way. Boat rides can be taken in the lake, in small pedal boats. In addition, there are four food kiosks, a restaurant, various viewpoints and much more.
