= Kabaddi in Canada =

Kabaddi (particularly circle kabaddi) is a sport mainly played by the South Asian community in Canada. A number of club competitions take place in Canada, some of which attract players from countries such as India.

== History ==
Kabaddi is noted for being particularly popular amongst the Punjabi community in Canada. It has become a popular high school sport in some parts of Surrey. Millions of dollars have been invested into kabaddi stadiums in Brampton and Surrey.

Kabaddi tournaments receive support from local businesses, as well as politicians who use them to obtain Punjabi votes. The tournaments have also been used to incentivize South Asians to avoid gang involvement.

== Controversy ==
Kabaddi has been alleged to have ties to gangsterism; for example, the National Kabaddi Association President, Kamaljit Singh 'Neetu' Kang, was targeted in a drive-by shooting in 2023. Other allegations include links to people-smuggling and drug abuse; of the 261 Indian kabaddi players who entered Canada between 2014 and 2017, only about half returned to India.

Canadians involved in kabaddi have also been alleged to have been involved in drug-related crimes in India.
