= Marhi Panuan =

Marhi Panuan Mari Panwan
- Location in Punjab, India Marhi Panuan (India)
- Coordinates: 31.712338°N 75.483589°E
- Country: India
- State: Punjab
- District: Gurdaspur
- Tehsil: Batala
- Region: Majha
- Established: Medieval India

Government
  - Type: Gram Panchayat

Population (2011)
  - Total: 3,388; 1,746/1,642 ♂/♀
  - Scheduled Castes: 973; 506/467 ♂/♀
  - Total Households: 633

Languages
  - Official: Punjabi
- Time zone: UTC+5:30 (IST)
- PIN: 143515
- Vehicle registration: PB-18
- Literacy: 65%
- Website: gurdaspur.nic.in

Marhi Panuan, also spelt Mari Panwan, is a village located in Batala Tehsil of Gurdaspur district in Punjab, India. As per 2016 status, Marhi Panuan village is also a gram panchayat. It is located 30 kilometres (19 mi) from sub district headquarter, 42 kilometres (26 mi) from district headquarter and 7 kilometres (4.3 mi) from Sri Hargobindpur. The village is administrated by Sarpanch an elected representative of the village.

== Geography ==
Marhi Panuan lies in a fertile, alluvial plain with an irrigation canal system. It is situated 34.3 kilometres (21.3 mi) away from sub-district headquarter Batala and 40.5 kilometres (25.2 mi) away from district headquarters Gurdaspur.

=== Climate ===
The geography and subtropical climate of Marhi Panuan leads to large variations in temperature from month to month. It experiences temperatures around 5 °C (41 °F) from December to February (winter season), when ground frost is commonly found. The temperature rises gradually with high humidity and overcast skies. However, the rise in temperature is steep when the sky is clear and humidity is low. Maximum temperatures usually occur in mid-May and June. The temperature remains above 40 °C (104 °F) during this period.

== Demographics ==
Marhi Panuan has a population of 3388 of which 1746 are males while 1642 are females as per Population Census 2011. The village has 633 households. The population of children with age 0-6 is 389 or 11.48% of the total. The average sex ratio of the village is 940 (women to 1000 men), higher than Punjab state average of 895. Child sex ratio for the village as per census is 852:1000, similar to the Punjab average of 846:1000.

According to the report published by Census India in 2011, out of the total population of the village 973 people are from Schedule Caste and the village does not have any Schedule Tribe population so far.

== Education ==
Marhi Panuan has one primary school, one middle school and one high school. The average literacy rate was 65% in 2011 compared to 75.84% of Punjab. Male literacy stands at 69% while female literacy rate was 60%.

== Sports ==
Punjabi Kabaddi, cricket and volleyball are the three most popular sports.
