= Sanjeev Sachdeva =

Judge of Supreme Court of India

Hon'ble Justice Sanjeev Sachdeva

Judge of Supreme Court of India
- Incumbent
- Assumed office 2 June 2026
- Nominated by: Surya Kant
- Appointed by: Droupadi Murmu

29th Chief Justice of Madhya Pradesh High Court
- In office 17 July 2025 – 1 June 2026
- Nominated by: B. R. Gavai
- Appointed by: Droupadi Murmu
- Preceded by: Suresh Kumar Kait
- Succeeded by: Alpesh Y. Kogje; Vivek Rusia (acting)

Judge of Madhya Pradesh High Court
- In office 31 May 2024 – 16 July 2025; Acting CJ: 25 May 2025 - 16 July 2025
- Nominated by: D. Y. Chandrachud
- Appointed by: Droupadi Murmu
- Acting Chief Justice
- In office 9 July 2024 – 24 September 2024
- Appointed by: Droupadi Murmu
- Preceded by: Ravi Malimath; Sheel Nagu (acting)
- Succeeded by: Suresh Kumar Kait

Judge of Delhi High Court
- In office 17 April 2013 – 30 May 2024
- Nominated by: Altamas Kabir
- Appointed by: Pranab Mukherjee

Personal details
- Born: 26 December 1964 (age 61) Delhi
- Education: Campus Law Centre, University of Delhi (LL.B); Sriram College of Commerce (B.Com); National Institute of Technology

Sanjeev Sachdeva (born 26 December 1964) is an Indian jurist, who is currently serving as judge of the Supreme Court of India. He served as the 29th Chief Justice of the Madhya Pradesh High Court. He is former judge and twice acting chief justice of Madhya Pradesh High Court. He also served as a judge of Delhi High Court before being transferred to Madhya Pradesh High Court.

== Early life and career ==
Sachdeva was born on 26 December 1964 in Delhi. He completed his schooling at Delhi Public School, Mathura Road. He graduated with a B.Com.(Hons.) from Shri Ram College of Commerce in 1985 and obtained his LL.B. from Campus Law Centre, University of Delhi, in 1988. He enrolled as an advocate with Bar Council of Delhi on 1 August 1988 and became an Advocate-on-Record of the Supreme Court in 1995, securing second position in the examination.

He served as Standing Counsel for the Bar Council of India for more than two decades and as a Senior Panel Lawyer for the Union of India for over ten years. He was designated Senior Advocate by the Delhi High Court on 28 July 2011. He also participated in the Commonwealth Young Lawyers Course at the University of London under a British Council Scholarship and contributed to advocacy training programmes for lawyers across several High Courts. He headed a National Court Management Systems sub-committee relating to human resource development in the judiciary.

== Judicial career ==
Sachdeva was appointed an Additional Judge of the Delhi High Court on 17 April 2013 and became Permanent on 18 March 2015. He was transferred to the Madhya Pradesh High Court on 31 May 2024 and served twice as its Acting Chief Justice before being appointed the 29th Chief Justice of the Madhya Pradesh High Court on 17 July 2025.

On 2 June 2026, Justice Sachdeva was elevated to the Supreme Court of India, marking the culmination of a legal career spanning nearly four decades across the Bar and the Bench.
