= Ravi Malimath =

27th Chief Justice of Madhya Pradesh High Court

Hon'ble Chief Justice (Retd.) Ravi Vijaykumar Malimath
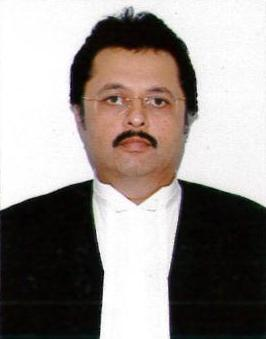

27th Chief Justice of Madhya Pradesh High Court
- In office 14 October 2021 – 24 May 2024
- Nominated by: N. V. Ramana
- Appointed by: Ram Nath Kovind
- Preceded by: Mohammad Rafiq
- Succeeded by: Suresh Kumar Kait; Sheel Nagu (acting); Sanjeev Sachdeva (acting)

Judge of Himachal Pradesh High Court
- In office 7 January 2021 – 13 October 2021
- Nominated by: Sharad Arvind Bobde
- Appointed by: Ram Nath Kovind
- Acting Chief Justice
- In office 1 July 2021 – 13 October 2021
- Appointed by: Ram Nath Kovind
- Preceded by: L. Narayana Swamy
- Succeeded by: Mohammad Rafiq

Judge of Uttarakhand High Court
- In office 5 March 2020 – 6 January 2021
- Nominated by: Sharad Arvind Bobde
- Appointed by: Ram Nath Kovind
- Acting Chief Justice
- In office 28 July 2020 – 6 January 2021
- Appointed by: Ram Nath Kovind
- Preceded by: R. Ranganathan
- Succeeded by: R. S. Chauhan

Judge of Karnataka High Court
- In office 18 February 2008 – 4 March 2020
- Nominated by: K. G. Balakrishnan
- Appointed by: Pratibha Patil

Personal details
- Born: 25 May 1962 (age 64) Karnataka, India
- Parent: V. S. Malimath (father)
- Education: B.Com and LL.B

Ravi Vijaykumar Malimath (born 25 May 1962) is former Indian judge who served as Chief Justice of the Madhya Pradesh High Court from October 2021 until his retirement in May 2024. He is a former judge and acting Chief Justice of Himachal Pradesh and Uttarakhand high courts and judge of and Karnataka High Court.

== Family and education ==
Malimath was born on 25 May 1962 in Karnataka. His paternal grandfather, S. S. Malimath, was a freedom fighter and one of the first two judges appointed to the High Court of Mysore, the predecessor of the Karnataka High Court. He also contributed to the movement for the unification of Karnataka. His father, Dr Justice V. S. Malimath, was a prominent jurist who served as Chief Justice of the Karnataka and Kerala High Courts and contributed to criminal justice reform through his Malimath Committee report. His maternal grandfather, Dr S. C. Nandimath, was a noted scholar of theology, linguistics, epigraphy, Sanskrit and Kannada, and served as an academic administrator.

Malimath graduated in Commerce from M. E. S. College, Bengaluru, and obtained his law degree from Sri Jagadguru Renukacharya College of Law. After completing his legal education, he joined the chambers of Shivaraj Patil, who subsequently became a judge of the Karnataka High Court and later the Supreme Court of India. He enrolled as an advocate on 28 January 1987 and practised for approximately two decades before the Karnataka High Court, the Madras High Court and the Supreme Court. His practice covered constitutional, civil, criminal, labour, service and company law, with particular specialisation in constitutional law. He also worked at Bangalore University and Kuvempu University.

== Career ==
Malimath was appointed an Additional Judge of the Karnataka High Court on 18 February 2008 and became permanent on 17 February 2010. He served there for approximately twelve years before being transferred to the Uttarakhand High Court, where he assumed office on 5 March 2020. On 28 July 2020, he became Acting Chief Justice of the Uttarakhand High Court, serving in that capacity until 6 January 2021. He then moved to the Himachal Pradesh High Court, assuming office as a judge on 7 January 2021. Following the retirement of Chief Justice L. N. Swamy, he was appointed as acting Chief Justice of the Himachal Pradesh High Court with effect from 1 July 2021.

His next elevation came in October 2021, when he became the 27th Chief Justice of the Madhya Pradesh High Court. He was sworn in on 14 October and took charge on 20 October 2021. He held the office until 24 May 2024, when he retired upon attaining the age of superannuation.
