= Parvinder Singh Jhota =

Indian anti-drug activist and Kabaddi player (1983/1984–2026)

- Born: Parvinder Singh; 1983 or 1984
- Died: 13 October 2026 (aged 42); Mansa, Punjab, India
- Cause of death: Assassination by gunshot
- Known for: Anti-drug activism

Parvinder Singh Jhota (1983 or 1984 – 13 October 2026) was an Indian anti-drug activist and Kabaddi player, and a convicted attempted murderer from Mansa, Punjab.

== Early life ==
Jhota was originally from Mansa, Punjab, India. His father Bhim Singh is a retired Army Serviceman. He was a freestyle kabaddi player before becoming an anti-drug activist. He launched 'Nasha Roko Rozgar Dyo' campaign in villages. He was also arrested and released by the police several times. He was also found positive in dope test once.

== Death ==
Jhota was shot dead in Mansa, Punjab, on 13 October 2026, while livestreaming on Facebook, after going to a medical store owner to question about allegedly selling drugs. He sustained three bullet injuries, two in the abdomen and one in the thigh. The medical store was in call with an officer of Punjab police before shooting.

=== Postmartem and Cremation ===
Jhota's postmortem was conducted on 7 November at PGIMER Chandigarh. After his body brought back to Mansa and 26 days of death the last riots took place on 8 November in his farm fields.

=== Aftermath ===
Ashwani Kumar, who is main accused in the murder of Jhota, was arrested by the police from Salasar, Rajasthan. Ashwani's Medical shop was demolished by the district administration and later was set on fire. One day statewide shutdown was called by Jhota's family, which got mixed responses from public. Accused Ashwani Kumar and Vipin Kumar were sent on police remand for 7 days. SGPC president Harjinder Dhami said that Jhota's portrait will be displayed at the Central Sikh Museum.

On 20 October, after the demand from the family the Punjab government handed the case over to Central Bureau of Investigation (CBI).

=== Fundraising ===
Two fundraising campaigns were launched to support Jhota's family but after two days both were shut down on the family's request. The first was started by an Australian resident on 15 October with a target of 160,000 Australian dollars (INR 1.05 cr), the goal was achieved in 47 hours. Another was started in the UK on 14 October with a target of 100,000 British pounds, it had raised 2,208 pounds before it was halted.
