= V. S. Malimath =

Indian jurist (1929-2015)

Hon'ble Chief Justice (Retd.) Vijaykumar S. Malimath

Chairman, Central Administrative Tribunal
- In office 5 December 1991 – 11 June 1994
- Appointed by: R. Venkataraman
- Preceded by: Amitav Banerji
- Succeeded by: Satish Chandra Mathur

12th Chief Justice of Kerala High Court
- In office 24 October 1985 – 11 June 1991
- Nominated by: P. N. Bhagwati
- Appointed by: Zail Singh
- Preceded by: K. Bhaskaran; T. K. Thommen (acting)
- Succeeded by: M. Jagannadha Rao; U. L. Bhat (acting)

10th Chief Justice of Karnataka High Court
- In office 6 February 1984 – 24 October 1985
- Nominated by: Y. V. Chandrachud
- Appointed by: Zail Singh
- Preceded by: K. Bhimaiah
- Succeeded by: Prem Chand Jain; K. Jagannatha Shetty (acting)

Judge of Karnataka High Court
- In office 5 March 1970 – 5 February 1984; Acting CJ : 11 April 1983 - 5 February 1984
- Nominated by: M. Hidayatullah
- Appointed by: V. V. Giri

Advocate General of Karnataka
- In office 23 February 1968 – 4 March 1970
- Appointed by: G. S. Pathak
- Chief Minister: S. Nijalingappa; Veerendra Patil
- Preceded by: T. Krishna Rao
- Succeeded by: E. S. Venkataramiah

Personal details
- Born: 12 July 1929
- Died: 22 December 2015 (aged 86) Bengaluru, Karnataka
- Children: Ravi Malimath
- Education: University of London (LL.B)

Vijaykumar Siddheshwaraswami Malimath (12 June 1929 – 22 December 2015) was an Indian jurist, who served as Chief Justice of the Kerala High Court and Karnataka High Court. He also was the Chairman of the Central Administrative Tribunal, and member of the National Human Rights Commission of India. He headed the Committee on Reform of Criminal Justice System.

== Education ==
Malimath did his primary education from Karnataka. He then secured First Rank in LL.B. and a post Graduate Diploma in Public International Law from University of London in 1952.

== Family ==
He was married to Prema Devi Malimath and had 4 daughters and one son Ravi Malimath, who also served as judge of Karnataka High Court and retired as chief justice of Madhya Pradesh High Court in 2024.

== Career ==
Malimath started his law practice in the High Court of Bombay in 1952. He moved his practice to Bangalore in 1956. The state then appointed him Advocate General in 1968. He rose rapidly through the ranks of the Judiciary. He was appointed a Judge of the Karnataka High Court in 1970 and became its acting chief justice in 1983 upon the retirement of the then chief justice K. Bhaskaran. He became the permanent Chief Justice of the Karnataka Court on 6 February 1984. He was then transferred to Kerala as its Chief Justice in 1985 and served till his retirement on 11 June 1991.

He served on the Central Administrative Tribunal as its chair. He served as a member of the National Human Rights Commission. After his retirement from the high court he also headed the Committee on Reform of Criminal Justice System in India. He was a U.N. Representative to monitor human rights enforcement in Nigeria and Sri Lanka. The International Bar Association included him in a fact-finding mission to Sri Lanka to assess the circumstances surrounding a call for a constitutional referendum and its effect on the country's judiciary.

He was also the chair of the Karnataka Border Protection Committee. He also headed committee for reforms in Code of Civil Procedure.

== Awards and honors ==
He represented India in several international conferences. He was conferred with the National Citizen's Award by the President of India, Rajyotsava Award by the Government of Karnataka, and an Honorary Doctorate of Law by Karnataka University. In 2011, Hampi University conferred the Nadoja Award upon V.S. Malimath.
