= Ashwani Kumar Mishra =

Indian jurist (born 1968)

Hon'ble Chief Justice Ashwani Kumar Mishra

37th Chief justice of Punjab & Haryana High Court
- Incumbent
- Assumed office 7 September 2026
- Nominated by: Surya Kant
- Appointed by: Droupadi Murmu
- Preceded by: Sheel Nagu

Judge of Punjab & Haryana High Court
- In office 21 July 2025 – 6 September 2026; Acting CJ : 2 June 2025 - 6 September 2026
- Nominated by: B. R. Gavai
- Appointed by: Droupadi Murmu

Judge of Allahabad High Court
- In office 3 February 2014 – 20 July 2025
- Nominated by: Altamas Kabir
- Appointed by: Pranab Mukherjee

Personal details
- Born: 16 November 1968 (age 57)
- Relations: Ajay Kumar Mishra (brother)
- Parent: Justice Shree Rang Mishra
- Education: Kirori Mal College (B.A), Faculty of Law, University of Delhi (LL.B)

Ashwani Kumar Mishra (born 16 November 1968) is an Indian jurist, who is currently serving as the chief justice of Punjab and Haryana High Court since 7 September 2025. He is former judge of Allahabad High Court and Punjab & Haryana High Court, where he also served as acting chief justice before becoming permanent.

== Education and background ==
Mishra was born in family of lawyers with his father Shree Rang Mishra being former judge of Allahabad and Calcutta High Court and elder brother Ajay Kumar Mishra is the current Advocate general of Uttar Pradesh since 2022. His academic foundation began at Delhi University, where he earned a B.A. (Honours) degree in Economics from Kirori Mal College before going on to obtain his LL.B. from the prestigious Campus Law Centre.

== Career ==
He formally entered the legal profession upon enrolling as an advocate on 8 May 1993. Over the next two decades, he built a highly successful practice that centered primarily on civil, constitutional, and service law. During this period, he served as an arguing counsel for numerous prominent statutory and corporate entities, including NOIDA, the Indian Oil Corporation, IFFCO, the Uttar Pradesh Power Corporation, and the development authorities of both Ghaziabad and Allahabad. His legal expertise also made him a trusted representative for the state government, which routinely engaged him as a senior counsel in high-stakes legal matters. In recognition of his exceptional standing and contributions to the bar, he was designated as a Senior Advocate in 2013.

His judicial career commenced shortly after when he was appointed as an Additional Judge of the Allahabad High Court on 3 February 2014. Demonstrating deep legal acumen, he was made a permanent judge of the same court on 1 February 2016. One of the most historic and high-profile verdicts delivered by a bench that included Justice Ashwani Kumar Mishra was the October 2023 ruling in the Nithari serial killings cases. Sitting on a division bench at the Allahabad High Court alongside Justice Syama Charan, Justice Mishra co-authored the landmark judgment that acquitted the two prime accused, Moninder Singh Pandher and his domestic help, Surinder Koli, in several cases where they had previously been sentenced to death. The bench overturned the capital punishment orders issued by a special CBI court, citing a severe failure on the part of the prosecution. In the detailed ruling, the bench expressed deep disappointment with how the investigation was handled. They pointed out that the probing agencies completely failed to gather solid forensic evidence and relied instead on flawed, uncorroborated confessions. The judgment highlighted that the investigation botches violated the basic constitutional rights of the accused to a fair trial, leading to the acquittals due to a lack of definitive proof beyond a reasonable doubt.

Justice Mishra dedicated over eleven years of service to the Allahabad High Court before being transferred to the Punjab and Haryana High Court, where he officially assumed his new responsibilities on 21 July 2025. Following the elevation of the then Chief Justice Sheel Nagu to the Supreme Court of India, Justice Mishra's seniority and administrative capabilities led to his appointment as the acting chief justice of the Punjab and Haryana High Court on 2 June 2026.

Supreme Court Collegium formally recommended Mishra's appointment as the permanent Chief Justice of the Punjab and Haryana High Court on 6 August 2026. This crucial recommendation came directly from the apex judicial body, led by Chief Justice of India Surya Kant. His appointment has been cleared by government on 5 September 2026 and he took oath of office on 7 September 2026 amid opposition by Government of Punjab which resulted in Punjab Chief Minister Bhagwant Mann's absence in ceremony.
