= Alpesh Y. Kogje =

30th Chief Justice of Madhya Pradesh High Court

The Honourable Chief Justice Alpesh Yeshvant Kogje

30th Chief Justice of Madhya Pradesh High Court
- Incumbent
- Assumed office 10 September 2026
- Nominated by: Surya Kant
- Appointed by: Droupadi Murmu
- Preceded by: Sanjeev Sachdeva; Vivek Rusia (acting)

Judge of Gujarat High Court
- In office 6 April 2016 – 9 September 2026
- Nominated by: T. S. Thakur
- Appointed by: Pranab Mukherjee

Personal details
- Born: 16 July 1969 (age 57) Kodinar, Gir Somnath
- Education: LL.B & B.Sc (from M. S. University)

Alpesh Yeshvant Kogje (born 16 July 1969) is an Indian jurist who is currently serving as the chief justice of Madhya Pradesh High Court since 10 September 2026. He is former judge of the Gujarat High Court.

== Life and career ==
Kogje was born on 16 July 1969, at Kodinar, Gir Somnath and raised up in Vadodara. completed a B.Sc. in Chemistry in 1990, and earned his LL.B. in 1993 from faculty of Law at Maharaja Sayajirao University of Baroda. He formally joined the Bar to begin his legal career that same year. Over the next decade, he built a strong practice and was appointed as an Assistant Government Pleader in 2001, followed by his appointment as an Additional Public Prosecutor in 2002, roles he held until 2007. His legal expertise deepened when he became the Standing Counsel for the Central Excise and Customs Department on 17 September 2008.

His extensive career at the Bar led to his elevation to the bench as an Additional Judge of the Gujarat High Court on 6 April 2016, and he was later confirmed as a permanent Judge on 15 March 2018. During his judicial tenure, he handled diverse and complex portfolios including civil services applications, revenue laws, indirect taxation, and contempt of court matters.

On 3 August 2023, a five-judge Supreme Court Collegium recommended his transfer to the Allahabad High Court for the better administration of justice. However, this transfer became part of a broader stand-off as the central government withheld the official notification, leaving the order unexecuted for over a year and keeping him at the Gujarat High Court as one of its senior-most judges. This status ultimately led the Supreme Court Collegium to recommend his direct elevation as the Chief Justice of the Madhya Pradesh High Court on 31 August 2026, successfully succeeding the acting leadership of Justice Vivek Rusia to head the Madhya Pradesh's highest judiciary. Government cleared his elevation on 5 September 2026 and he took oath of office on 10 September 2026.

== Role in the 2002 Godhra Riot Cases ==
Due to his strong background in complex criminal and appellate matters, he was appointed by the Supreme Court-appointed Special Investigation Team (SIT) as a Special Public Prosecutor on 7 June 2011 to handle highly sensitive cases and appeals related to the 2002 Godhra riots. In this capacity, he handled a high volume of critically sensitive and high-profile criminal matters and appellate cases arising from the communal violence. More recently, as a judge, he sat on a division bench of the Gujarat High Court that delivered a key verdict on 6 March 2025, upholding a lower court's acquittal of six individuals accused in the tragic killing of three British nationals during the post-Godhra riots.
