= Anu Sivaraman =

Indian High Court judge (born 1966)

The Honourable Justice Anu Sivaraman

Judge Karnataka High Court
- Incumbent
- Assumed office 21 March 2024
- Nominated by: Dhananjaya Y. Chandrachud
- Appointed by: Droupadi Murmu

Judge Kerala High Court
- In office 11 April 2015 – 20 March 2024
- Nominated by: H. L. Dattu
- Appointed by: Pranab Mukherjee

Personal details
- Born: 25 May 1966 (age 60) Ernakulam
- Citizenship: Indian
- Education: Government Law College, Ernakulam
- Website: High Court of Kerala

Anu Sivaraman (born 25 May 1966) is a judge of Karnataka High Court in India. Sivaraman was initially appointed as an additional judge of the Kerala High Court in April 2015, and was made a permanent judge in April 2017. Sivaraman, by a communication to supreme court dated 16 October 2023 sought a transfer out of the State of Kerala.

== Early life ==
Sivaraman completed her schooling from St.Teresa's Convent Girls High School, joined for graduation in English Literature at St. Teresa's College and completed from Maharaja's College, Ernakulam, completed Diploma in Journalism from Kerala Media Academy in 1987 and obtained a law degree from Government Law College, Ernakulam.

== Career ==
Sivaraman enrolled as an Advocate in 1991. During her practice, she served as Standing Counsel for the Corporation of Cochin from 2001 to 2010, Senior Government Pleader from January 2007 and Special Government Pleader (Co-operation) during 2010–2011. On 10 April 2015 she was appointed as additional judge of Kerala High Court and became permanent from 5 April 2017. She was transferred to Karnataka High Court with effect from 21 March 2024.

She was appointed as member of 3 Judge panel along with Punjab and Haryana High Court Judge Sheel Nagu and Himachal Pradesh High Court Chief Justice Gurmeet Singh Sandhawalia constituted by CJI Sanjiv Khanna on 22 March 2025 to probe into the allegations of cash recovery at residence of Delhi High Court Judge Yashwant Varma.
