= 2026 Noida workers protest =

Wage protests in Uttar Pradesh, India

Protests in Noida took place after the workers demanded wage hike.

The protests turned violent on 4th day. As of 14 April, about 300 protestors were arrested.

Following the protests, the Uttar Pradesh government decided to increase minimum wages by 20-21 percent. By April 16, some domestic workers also joined the protests to demand wage hike and better working conditions. On 18 April, the Uttar Pradesh government approved modified minimum wage rates throughout the state. Some protestors reportedly went missing following the crackdown.

On September 2, 2026, the Allahabad High Court issued a landmark ruling quashing the detention of 25-year-old student-activist Akriti Chaudhary under the stringent National Security Act (NSA).

The division bench fiercely criticized Gautam Buddha Nagar District Magistrate (DM) Medha Roopam, calling her use of preventive detention "worthy of derision" and an attempt to "make an example" out of activists. The court warned that such misuse of administrative power risks turning the region into an "Orwellian Dystopia".

The High Court ordered a ₹5 lakh financial compensation package for Chaudhary, directing that the amount be recovered directly from the personal salaries of DM Medha Roopam and involved police officials.

On September 9, 2026, the Solicitor General of India notified the Supreme Court that the Uttar Pradesh government intends to legally challenge the Allahabad High Court’s ruling against the Noida administration.

Despite the quashing of NSA charges in Chaudhary's case, human rights groups like the Campaign for the Release of Workers and Activists of Noida (CaRWAN) held national press conferences and solidarity rallies in mid-September demanding the release of 8 remaining activists and roughly 15 to 50 factory workers who remain jailed under severe criminal charges. Many face continuing job loss and crushing debt from legal defense fees.
