= Suresh Kumar Kait =

Chief Justice of the Madhya Pradesh High Court

Hon'ble Chief Justice (Retd.) Suresh Kumar Kait

28th Chief Justice of Madhya Pradesh High Court
- In office 25 September 2024 – 23 May 2025
- Nominated by: Dhananjaya Y. Chandrachud
- Appointed by: Droupadi Murmu
- Preceded by: Ravi Malimath; Sheel Nagu (acting); Sanjeev Sachdeva (acting)
- Succeeded by: Sanjeev Sachdeva

Judge of Delhi High Court
- In office 12 October 2018 – 24 September 2024
- Nominated by: Dipak Misra
- Appointed by: Ram Nath Kovind
- In office 5 September 2008 – 11 April 2016
- Nominated by: K. G. Balakrishnan
- Appointed by: Pratibha Patil

Judge of Andhra Pradesh High Court
- In office 12 April 2016 – 11 October 2018
- Nominated by: T. S. Thakur
- Appointed by: Pranab Mukherjee

Personal details
- Born: 24 May 1963 (age 63) Kaithal, Haryana
- Education: Kurukshetra University, Delhi University

Suresh Kumar Kait (born 24 May 1963) is a retired Indian judge. He is a former Chief Justice of the Madhya Pradesh High Court and former judge of the Delhi and Andhra Pradesh high courts.

== Controversies ==
=== False temple demolition allegations ===
In December 2024, Justice Kait was accused of alleged removal of a Hanuman temple from his official residence by a Madhya Pradesh High Court Bar Association member Sanjay Tripathi. Bar president Dhanya Kumar Jain forwarded the complaint to the CJI, the PM, the President and other high ranking officials. Justice Kait, the MP high court administration and the State Government's Public Works Department (PWD) clarified that no such temple had ever existed at the Chief Justice's residence. Following this, Bar Association President Dhanya Jain wrote an apology letter to Justice Kait withdrawing his complaint, mentioning that he had created confusion, for which he was "extremely sad", expressing regret for his actions and reaffirming his respect for the Chief Justice.
