= Gopiram Bargayn Burabhakat =

Indian artist (1925–2026)

- Born: 1 January 1925; Namkatani Gaon, Majuli, Assam Province, British India
- Died: 14 September 2026 (aged 101)
- Occupation: Sattriya artist
- Awards: Padma Shri

Gopiram Bargayn Burabhakat (1 January 1925 – 14 September 2026) was an Indian sattriya artist from Majuli, Assam.

== Life and career ==
Burabhakat was born on 1 January 1925. He was only five years old when he arrived at the Sri Sri Uttar Kamalabari Sattra in 1930. Burabhakat remained an ardent supporter and promoter of Sattriya Dance from then.

He was the recipient of the Padma Shri (2021).

Burabhakat died on 14 September 2026, at the age of 101.

== Awards ==
Burabhakat received various awards for his contribution to and promotion of Sattriya traditions. Some of the awards he received are as follows.

- Sangeet Natak Akademi award
- Tagore Award
- Padma Shri
