= Cheruvayal Raman =

Indian tribal farmer (1952–2026)

Cheruvayal K. Raman
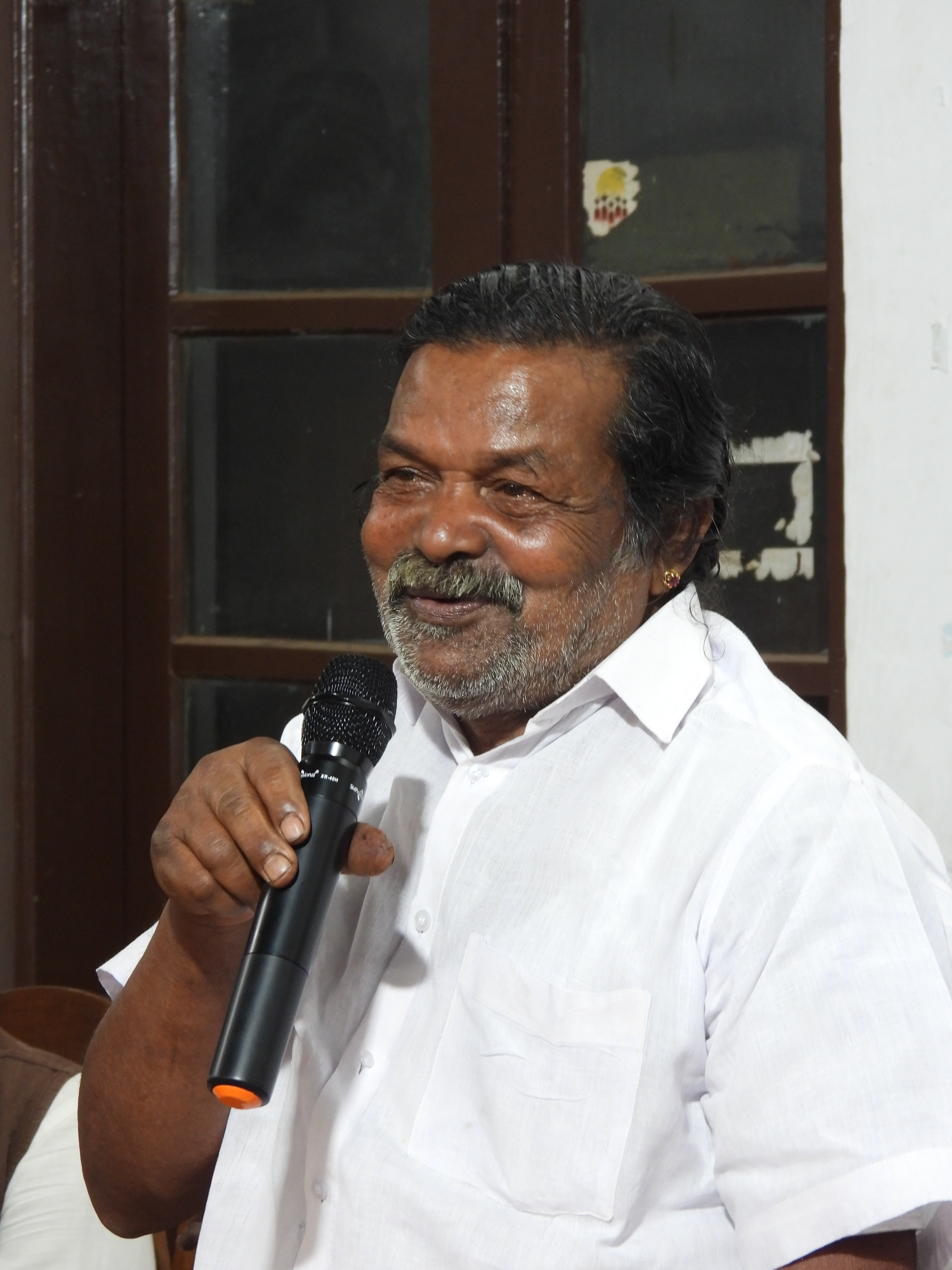
- Raman in 2026
- Born: 2 February 1952; Wayanad, Malabar District, Madras State, India
- Died: 14 October 2026 (aged 74)
- Years active: 1964–2023
- Awards: Padma Shri

Cheruvayal K. Raman (2 February 1952 – 14 October 2026) was an Indian tribal farmer from Wayanad district, Kerala. He was known as the guardian of rare seeds.

== Life and career ==
Without having any knowledge of conventional sciences like agriculture science or botany, he was known for conserving over 55 rice varieties on his small farm at Kammana. Raman started farming on 40 acres (16 ha) of land given to him by his uncle. In January 2023, the Indian government honoured him with the Padma Shri, the fourth highest civilian award in the country. He earned this achievement through his efforts in seed preservation. This led to him being locally known as "Nellachan" (The father of paddy seeds). Raman died on 14 October 2026, at the age of 74.
