= New Zealand–India Free Trade Agreement =

Free trade agreement between New Zealand and India

- Type: Free Trade Agreement
- Context: Trade agreement between New Zealand and India
- Signed: 27 April 2026
- Location: New Delhi, India
- Sealed: 21 September 2026
- Effective: 20 October 2026
- Parties: New Zealand; India

The New Zealand—India Free Trade Agreement is a bilateral free trade agreement between New Zealand and India signed on 27 April 2026. It has not yet come into effect. On 17 September 2026, the New Zealand Parliament passed legislation implementing the free trade agreement. On 21 September, the two governments formally ratified the New Zealand-India free trade agreement, which came into effect on 20 October 2026.

== Background ==
Bilateral merchandise trade was worth US$1.3 billion in 2024–2025, with total trade in goods and services of US$2.4 billion in 2024. As of April 2026, bilateral trade between India and New Zealand was worth an estimated NZ$3.95 billion.

== History ==
On 22 December 2025, the Indian and New Zealand governments announced plans to sign a free trade agreement in 2026. The agreement would eliminate tariffs on 95% of New Zealand exports to India including kiwifruits, apples, meat, wool, coal, and forestry. While certain New Zealand dairy exports such as re-exports and bulk infant formula will be duty-free, most dairy products will still be subject to tariffs. Milk albumins will be subject to a 50 percent tariff cut under a quota programme. In return, New Zealand will eliminate duties on all Indian exports, including textiles, apparel, leather, footwear, marine products, gems and jewelry, handicrafts, engineering goods and automobiles. In addition, New Zealand will invest US$20 billion in India over the next twenty years and improve visa access for Indian professionals, skilled workers and students. The NZ-India free trade agreement would also allow 5,000 Indian temporary migrants to enter New Zealand for the next three years, with a focus on information technology, engineering, healthcare, education, construction workers, Indian traditional medicine practitioners, yoga instructors, chefs and music teachers.

Several New Zealand agricultural and industrial bodies, including Export NZ, the NZ Forest Owners Association, the Meat Industry Association, Beef + Lamb New Zealand, Horticulture New Zealand, NZ Timber Industry Federation, and Wools of New Zealand, welcomed the free trade agreement. The Dairy Companies Association expressed disappointment that core products such as butter and cheese had been excluded from the agreement. New Zealand First leader Winston Peters opposed the agreement on the grounds that it disadvantaged New Zealand's dairy industry and boosted Indian immigration to New Zealand. Peters invoked the party's "agree to disagree" provision of its coalition agreement with the National-led coalition government. Concerns about the impact of the free trade agreement on migrant labour exploitation, transparency and the impact of immigration on unemployment, housing infrastructure, and race relations were also raised by the New Zealand Council of Trade Unions, the Maritime Union of New Zealand, NZ First deputy leader Shane Jones and Waatea News editor Matthew Tukaki.

NZ First deputy leader Shane Jones attracted controversy after making racially-tinged remarks targeting Indian migrants during an interview with the online radio station Reality Check Radio. Jones had opposed the proposed India-New Zealand agreement on the grounds that it would allow "unfettered" immigration into New Zealand, stating: "I don't care how much criticism I get. I am never going to agree with a butter chicken tsunami coming to New Zealand." Jones's remarks drew criticism from across the New Zealand political spectrum including Prime Minister Christopher Luxon, Deputy Prime Minister and ACT party leader David Seymour, Labour leader Chris Hipkins, National Party MP Carlos Cheung, ACT MP Parmjeet Parmar and Immigration Minister Erica Stanford, who described them as "unhelpful" and offensive to Indian New Zealanders. Several Indian community leaders including Auckland Indian Association president Shanti Patel, New Zealand Indian Central Association Veer Khar, NZ Indian Business Association general secretary Jaspreet Kandhari and the New Zealand Sikh Society Hamilton's former president Yugraj Singh Mahil also expressed disapproval and condemnation of Jones's remarks. In response, Jones defended his comments and reiterated his criticism of the India-New Zealand free trade agreement, stating "immigration has been snuck into the free trade deal in a way that does not reflect the expectations of Kiwis". Jones's remarks also attracted coverage in the Indian and international media.

On 23 April 2026, Labour Party leader Chris Hipkins confirmed that his party would support legislation enabling the agreement, giving the National and ACT parties the votes in Parliament needed, given that New Zealand First would vote against it. The free trade agreement was signed by NZ Trade and Investment Minister Todd McClay and Indian Commerce and Industry Minister Piyush Goyal in New Delhi on 27 April. New Zealand Prime Minister Christopher Luxon also attended the signing ceremony.

On 17 September, the New Zealand Parliament passed legislation approving the free trade agreement by a margin of 93 to 29 votes. While National, ACT and Labour supported the bill, it was opposed by NZ First, the Green Party, Te Pāti Māori and independent MPs Mariameno Kapa-Kingi and Takuta Ferris. The Indian and New Zealand governments rarified the free trade agreement on 20 September, which came into force on 20 October.
