= Khiranwali =

- Village
- Location in Punjab, India Khiranwali (India)
- Coordinates: 31.389685°N 75.285821°E
- Country: India
- State: Punjab
- District: Kapurthala

Government
  - Type: Panchayati raj (India)
  - Body: Gram panchayat

Population (2011)
  - Total: 1,041
- Sex ratio 530/511♂/♀

Languages
  - Official: Punjabi
  - Other spoken: Hindi
- Time zone: UTC+5:30 (IST)
- PIN: 144601
- Telephone code: 01822
- ISO 3166 code: IN-PB
- Vehicle registration: PB-09
- Website: kapurthala.gov.in

Khiranwali is a village in Kapurthala district of Punjab State, India. It is located 10 kilometres (6.2 mi) from Kapurthala, which is both district and sub-district headquarters of Khiranwali. The village is administrated by a Sarpanch, who is an elected representative.

== Demography ==
According to the report published by Census India in 2011, Khiranwali has total number of 206 houses and population of 1,041 of which include 530 males and 511 females. Literacy rate of Khiranwali is 77.45%, higher than state average of 75.84%. The population of children under the age of 6 years is 106 which is 10.18% of total population of Khiranwali, and child sex ratio is approximately 582, lower than state average of 846.

== Population data ==
Particulars	Total	Male	Female
Total No. of Houses	206	-	-
Population	1,041	530	511
Child (0–6)	106	67	39
Schedule Caste	337	176	161
Schedule Tribe	0	0	0
Literacy	73.58 %	77.32 %	69.92 %
Total Workers	303	285	18
Main Worker	253	0	0
Marginal Worker	50	46	4

== Air travel connectivity ==
The closest airport to the village is Sri Guru Ram Dass Jee International Airport.
