= Tiruvallur ammonia gas leak =

2026 industrial accident in Tamil Nadu

- Location within India Location within Tamil Nadu
- Date: 21 June 2026
- Time: 11:00 am
- Location: Tamil Nadu, India; 13.271325°N 80.106271°E
- Cause: Ammonia refrigerant storage piping leak
- Deaths: 18
- Injuries: 83

On 21 June 2026, an ammonia gas leak at Tiruvallur district in Tamil Nadu, India resulted in death of 18 women workers and injured 83. All the dead were women workers sleeping in dormitory located above the processing facility.

== Facility ==
St Peter & Paul Sea Foods is an integrated sea food processing business located in Tamil Nadu state in India. It owned a dozen fishing boats and another 100 boats were operated on lease. The business operated fish landing area at Chennai Port, where the fish good for export market were transported to the processing plant in Kannigaipair village and the remaining were supplied to the local markets.

The Kannigaipair village is filled with agricultural fields and industrial units and is located along the four-lane National Highway 716A. The seafood processing unit is adjacent to highway and spread over 8,000 m^{2}. It has three ice plants with the capacity to produce 1446 blocks in a day using ammonia refrigerant. The ice produced was used for boats for preserving raw materials. To store seafood, the unit operated freezers that can freeze about 105 tons per day, 1300-ton cold storage units, 125-ton chill rooms and 20-ton flake ice units.

At the time of accident, the dormitory for workers was located on the first floor of the processing unit. According to the police, around 120 migrant workers were living on the factory premises, including women from Assam, Odisha and Jharkhand states of India.

An earlier ammonia gas leak occurred on in the facility on 23 October 2014, which claimed one life.

== Accident ==
The quantity of ammonia gas handled in Kannigaipair processing unit is not publicly available. The gas system had reportedly been refilled a few days before the accident. The first floor also hosted part of the refrigeration system used in the processing operations.

The ammonia piping of refrigeration unit leaked around 11 am on Sunday 21 June 2026, near the women's accommodation located above fish processing area. At the time of gas leak, 80 workers were working in ground floor and around 60 women workers were asleep in dormitory on first floor.

The toxic gas spread through the first-floor dormitory area where women workers were sleeping. The sleeping workers were overcome by toxic gas and were unable to escape in time. Women untrained for an emergency took refuge in bathrooms.

The workers on the ground abandoned their work and escaped. Some workers tried to suppress the gas by pouring water on the leaking pipeline. Some escaped workers covered their faces with wet cloths and reentered the gas filled building to pull out the unconscious and semi-conscious women on first floor. Many of the rescued women had suffered severe exposure to the toxic fumes. Exposed workers developed blisters on their skin and swollen eyes.

== Casualties and aftermath ==
By 3 July 2026, a total of 18 workers has died due to respiratory injuries. The majority of workers were migrant workers from Assam, Jharkhand and Odisha states.

The Government of Tamil Nadu announced immediate relief of Indian Rupees 2 lakhs to the families of each of the deceased workers from Chief Minister's Relief Fund.

On 3 and 4 July district authorities evacuated remaining 1.5-ton inventory of ammonia from the premises. The factory was ordered to closed since the incident.

== Investigations ==
State police arrested the factory owners, factory manager and the labour recruitment agent under culpable homicide and child labor charges. The Directorate of Industrial Safety and Health, Tamil Nadu Pollution Control Board, Labour and Police Departments initiated separate inquiries.

The Government of Tamil Nadu constituted an expert committee consisting of Director of the Directorate of Industrial Safety and Health (DISH), the Secretary of TNPCB and the Director of Public Health to investigate the accident. The investigation report has not been published yet.

The incident was raised by Dr. M. Dhanpal in the Rajya Sabha, the upper house of Parliament of India on 23 July 2026.

== Regulation of ammonia handling ==
The Directorate of Industrial Safety and Health functioning under Labor Welfare and Skill Development Department, Government of Tamil Nadu oversee the industrial safety and worker's welfare in organized manufacturing sector and in construction sites in Tamil Nadu state. Main legislations regulating industrial safety and welfare in Tamil Nadu are:

- The Tamil Nadu Factories Rules 1950
- Manufacture, Storage and Import of Hazardous Chemicals Rules 1989
- The Tamil Nadu Control of Industrial Major Accident Hazards Rules 1994.

In schedule 2 of Tamil Nadu Control of Industrial Major Accident Hazards (TNCIMAH) Rules, ammonia is categorized hazardous chemical. This rule defines installations storing 60 tons or more of ammonia as major accident hazard (MAH) installation.

As of 30 June 2026, Tamil Nadu has 55,214 registered factories in which 2,772,170 workers are employed. Around 60 seafood export companies, similar to the one in Tiruvallur, are operating across the State.

Factories' rules or Control of Industrial Major Accident Hazards Rules do not enforce any requirements for separation between major accident hazard installation and worker residence.

In 2024, Government of Tamil Nadu had published a directive to implement the recommendations made by Technical Committee formed to investigate Ennore ammonia gas subsea pipeline leak on 26 December 2023. This 4-page directive requires implementation of risk assessment, public awareness, pipeline monitoring, breathing apparatus, gas sensors, emergency evacuation etc. in ammonia handling facilities in Tamil Nadu.

The building plan of industrial building and the worker accommodation are governed by Tamil Nadu Combined Development and Building Rules, 2019. Annexure – XVIII Zoning Regulations. The rules allow residential buildings connected with the industry to be located in 'Hazardous Industrial Use Zone'.
