= 2026 Assam floods =

Floods in northeast India

- State of Assam in north-east India
- Date: 19 July 2026–[ongoing]
- Location: Upper Assam, Assam, India
- Cause: Cloudburst
- Deaths: 100+
- Displaced: More than 700,000

On 19 July 2026, a cloudburst occurred in Mon district, Nagaland causing the rise of water level and flooding in the districts of Sivasagar, Charaideo, Jorhat and Golaghat in Assam. There was unusually heavy monsoon rainfall over Nagaland, Arunachal Pradesh, and eastern Assam. The heavy rain caused many hill-fed rivers and tributaries to overflow, leading to widespread flooding in Upper Assam before spreading to other areas of the state. The floods caused significant damage to infrastructure, agriculture, and public property, impacting hundreds of thousands of people.

As of 4 August 2026, 85 people have lost their lives and more than 1 lakh people still remain affected.

== Background ==
Assam is one of India's most flood-prone states because of its extensive river network, low-lying floodplains, and the annual southwest monsoon. Seasonal flooding is common here. However, the 2026 floods were worsened by heavy rainfall in the upstream areas of Nagaland, Arunachal Pradesh, and parts of eastern Assam. The Assam government reported that extreme rainfall in these regions led to rapid increases in the water levels of rivers flowing from the Naga and Patkai Hills into Assam. At the same time, high water levels in the Brahmaputra reduced the drainage capacity of these tributaries, making flooding in Upper Assam worse.

The districts of Sivasagar, Charaideo, Jorhat and Golaghat lies in the Brahmaputra Valley of Assam, a flood prone region. The Brahmaputra river is supplied by more than 50 tributaries in the region, sustaining agriculture, recharging wetlands, and maintaining one of the world's richest floodplain ecosystems.

=== Metrological Conditions ===
The India Meteorological Department (IMD) noted that north-eastern India saw continuous heavy to very heavy rainfall in July 2026. Several monsoon systems brought intense rain to Nagaland, Arunachal Pradesh, and eastern Assam, leading to flash floods and a rapid increase in river levels. Hydrological experts linked the disaster to a mix of extreme rainfall upstream, saturated catchments, and limited drainage downstream due to already high water levels in the Brahmaputra.

== Cause ==
While many sources report that the flood and sudden rise of water level was caused by excessive rains in the hills of neighboring Nagaland, some say that deforestation and mining in the region also played a role in it. The south-bank tributaries of Brahmaputra - Dikhow, Disang, Janji, and Dhansiri swelled rapidly crossing the danger mark.

== Flooding ==
Flooding first increased in the districts of Sivasagar, Jorhat, Golaghat, Dibrugarh, Tinsukia, Dhemaji, Majuli, and Charaideo before spreading to other areas of Assam. Rivers like the Dikhow, Disang, Dhansiri, Jhanji, and Jamuna overflowed. This inundated hundreds of villages and damaged embankments, roads, bridges, and railway infrastructure. Several highways became impassable, while railway services were canceled or redirected because of submerged tracks. Ferry services were also disrupted in many locations.

== Damage ==
As of 26 July 2026, 68 people have lost their lives and almost 10 lakh were affected. Around 37,000 hectares of crop area have been submerged, causing a significant loss of livelihood in agriculture dependent areas. Many livestock have also been washed away. Significant damage to houses, roads and other public infrastructure has also been reported from various areas.

By early August, northern Assam was severely affected by the flooding, notably Sivasagar and Charaideo districts. In Sivasagar, 48 fatalities were reported, 29 of which were attributed to flood-related incidents in Nazira; meanwhile, 29 others were swept away by floods in Charaideo, according to official sources. A key bridge was swept away in Udalguri, cutting off access to Kathpuri village and leaving many completely straded. On 8 August, it was reported that at least 155,000 people were affected by the floods, with Golaghat being the worst-hit district. In addition, an estimate of 10,748 hectares (26,560 acres) of cropland were submerged and the overall flood-related death toll being 98. The Chief Minister of Assam, Himanta Biswa Sarma, stated that the government will conduct door-to-door digital damage assessments by August 9. According to a local news source, the flooding completely submerged around 481 villages, damaged several roads and bridges, and disrupted traffic and relief efforts.

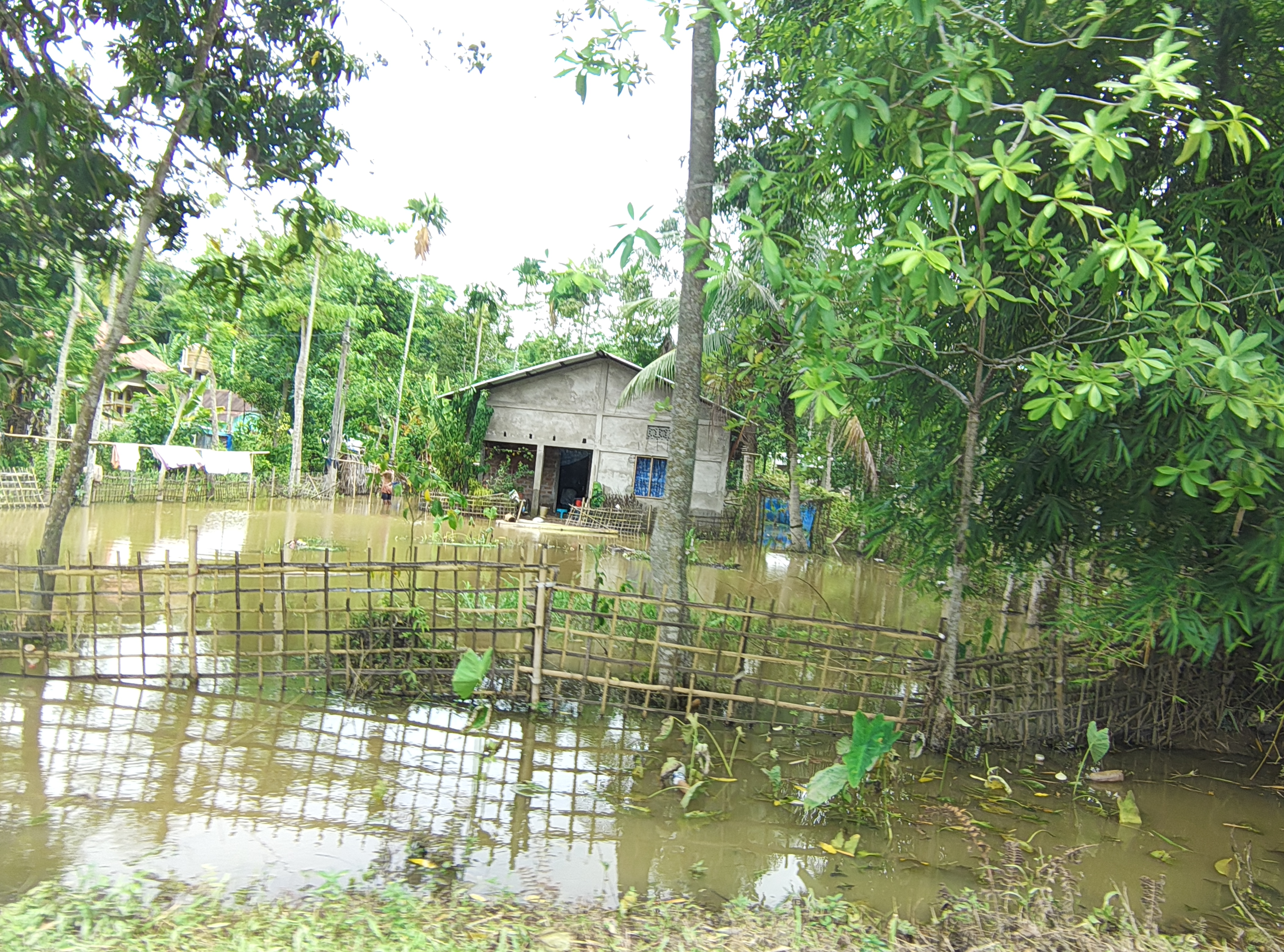
Flood Affected Home at Tipomia Village near Gauri Sagar, Jorhat.

== Relief efforts ==
Joint rescue operations by the Army, National Disaster Response Force, State Disaster Response Force, police and other emergency services have helped evacuate several people from different part.

According to authorities, 90 relief camps were operational, providing shelter to almost 30,000 people while another 94 relief distribution centers were supplying essential assistance. Gurdwara in Sivasagar provided shelter, food and essential services to hundreds of displaced families. People from around the state and nation have send relief materials and volunteered in distributing them to the affected people.
