= World Kabaddi League =

Global Kabaddi League
- Sport: Circle style kabaddi
- Founded: 2014
- First season: 2014
- CEO: Raman Raheja
- President: Sukhbir Singh Badal
- Commissioner: Pargat Singh
- Country: India; United States; Canada; United Kingdom; Pakistan

The Global Kabaddi League (GKL), formerly World Kabaddi League (WKL), was a professional circle-style kabaddi league with teams from various countries.

== History ==
=== First season: 2014 ===
The league's first season was in 2014 in which 8 international teams played in 14 cities in 4 different countries. Three of the teams had celebrity owners. The regular season was four months long, and was followed by an elimination tournament that took place in Mohali, Punjab, India, in which the top four teams determined a champion. Khalsa Warriors beat United Singhs to win the inaugural season.

==== Teams ====
Club Name	Country	Host city	Owner
Khalsa Warriors	India	London Heathrow, England, United Kingdom	Akshay Kumar
Yo Yo Tigers	India	Toronto, Canada	Honey Singh
Vancouver Lions	Canada	Abbotsford, British Columbia, Canada	Gurjit Singh Purewal
Punjab Thunder	India	Surrey, British Columbia, Canada	Thind Properties and Rajat Bedi
Lahore Lions	Pakistan	Lahore, Punjab, Pakistan	Government of Punjab, Pakistan
United Singhs	United Kingdom	Birmingham, England, United Kingdom	Sonakshi Sinha
California Eagles	United States	Stockton, California, United States	Tut Group
Royal Kings	United States	Sacramento, California, United States	Thiara Company

==== Venues ====
The venues of the World Kabaddi League spanned five countries.

City	Country	Venue	Image
Abbotsford	Canada	Abbotsford Arena	
Amritsar	India	GNDU Hockey Stadium	
Birmingham	United Kingdom	LG Arena	
Bathinda	India	Bhatinda Hockey Stadium	
Delhi	India	Indira Gandhi Indoor Stadium	
London	United Kingdom	The O2 Arena	
Lahore	Pakistan	Punjab Stadium	
Jalandhar	India	Burlton Park Hockey Stadium	
Ludhiana	India	Hockey Ground, Punjab Agricultural University	
Mohali	India	International Hockey Stadium	
New York City	United States	Nassau Coliseum	
Sacramento	United States	Sleep Train Arena	
Stockton	United States	SMG Stockton Arena	
Hamilton	Canada	FirstOntario Centre	
Vancouver	Canada		

==== Television broadcasters ====
Sony SIX has signed on to broadcast the league in India. PTC Punjabi has signed on to broadcast the league around the world.

Nation/Territory	Broadcaster
India	Sony SIX
United States of America	PTC Punjabi
United Kingdom	PTC Punjabi
Canada	PTC Punjabi
Australia	PTC Punjabi
Pakistan	Geo Super

=== Second season: 2016 ===
The second season of the league was held in 2016, but had numerous budgetary problems. It featured 6 teams:

- California Eagles
- Khalsa Warriors
- Milwaukee Wolves
- Punjab Tigers
- Royal Kings USA
- United Singhs

California Eagles beat Royal Kings USA to win the final. The 2017 season was indefinitely postponed.

=== Third season: 2018 ===
After a reorganization, the league rebranded itself as the Global Kabaddi League and launched the new version in 2018. The only team to return for the third season was the California Eagles. The teams in this season were:

- Black Panthers
- Delhi Tigers
- California Eagles
- Haryana Lions
- Maple Leaf Canada
- Singh Warriors Punjab

This version of the league lasted until the final match on November 3, 2018. California Eagles defeated Haryana Lions to win the season. The games were broadcast by PTC Punjabi's channels.

== Playing technique ==
Two teams of seven players face each other in a circle and take turns sending a "raider" into the other team. To win a point, the raider must take a breath, run into the opposing half, tag one member of the opposite team, then return to his home. The raider will have only 30 seconds to touch the opponents and come back to his home. The game is played with 20-minute halves and a five-minute half-time break during which teams exchange sides.
