= UGC Equity Regulations, 2026 =

The University Grants Commission (Promotion of Equity in Higher Education Institutions) Regulations, 2026, commonly referred to as the UGC Equity Regulations, 2026 or the Anti-Discrimination Rules, 2026, are regulations notified by the University Grants Commission (UGC) in India aimed at addressing discrimination within higher education institutions (HEIs). The regulations seek to replace the existing 2012 regulations with more stringent measures to ensure inclusion for students from marginalized backgrounds, particularly the Scheduled Castes (SC), Scheduled Tribes (ST) and Other Backward Classes (OBC).

The bill saw protests against the Bharatiya Janta Party (BJP) across the country. As of 29 January 2026, the Supreme Court of India has stayed the proposed regulations.

== Key provisions of the regulations ==
The regulations introduce several mandates for colleges and universities to promote equity:

- Anti-discrimination cells: Institutions must establish a dedicated cell to handle complaints related to discrimination based on caste, religion, gender, or disability.
- Equity officers: Institutions are required to appoint an "Equity Officer" to oversee the implementation of inclusive policies and ensure that students from disadvantaged groups are not harassed or excluded from academic and extracurricular activities.
- Inclusion in curriculum: There are suggestions for sensitizing faculty and students through mandatory orientation programs and the inclusion of equity-based themes in the academic environment.
- Oversight in implementation: Institutions are required to submit annual reports to the UGC detailing the number of discrimination complaints received and the actions taken. The UGC would also maintain a portal to track institutional compliance across the country
- Stricter penalties: The regulations provide for financial penalties and the potential withdrawal of grants for institutions that fail to comply with the equity standards or ignore complaints of discrimination.

== Implementation ==
Under the proposed regulations, colleges will be required to submit annual reports to the UGC detailing the number of discrimination complaints received and the actions taken. The UGC would also maintain a portal to track institutional compliance across the country.

The regulations require higher education institutions to establish an Equity Committee chaired by the head of the institution, with representation from faculty, non-teaching staff, civil society, and students from SC, ST, OBC, persons with disability, and women backgrounds. The committee is mandated to meet at least twice annually, investigate complaints within 24 hours for severe cases and within 15 working days for standard complaints, and recommend corrective action. Institutions are also required to establish an Equal Opportunity Centre and appoint an Ombudsperson for escalated grievances.

== Protests ==
A vandalised information board with a "UGC ROLL BACK" graffiti on it

Following the notification of the Regulations, widespread demonstrations broke out across several Indian cities, including Delhi, Mumbai, Chennai, and Hyderabad. Protests were particularly concentrated at major educational institutions such as Jawaharlal Nehru University (JNU) and the University of Hyderabad, where student organizations and faculty expressed divergent views on the legislation. On 28 January, a Bharatiya Janta Party (BJP) functionary quit his post in Raebareli. Abhishek Pandey, the district head of the 'Savarna Army', called the bill a “black law", and wrote a letter to Narendra Modi with his blood. Indian Education minister Dharmendra Pradhan commented on the protests that nobody would be permitted to misuse the law.

Politicians and activists such as Priyanka Chaturvedi, Rakesh Tikait, among others opposed the UGC regulations.

The protests have been characterized by a divide in student opinion:

- Opposition to the Regulations: Some student groups and teachers' associations have staged demonstrations at Jantar Mantar, arguing that the regulations are "arbitrary" and could lead to the harassment of staff and students. Concerns have been raised regarding a perceived threat to academic freedom and the potential for the regulations to create an atmosphere of surveillance and identity-based polarization on campuses.
- Support and demands for reform: Conversely, other student factions have held rallies in support of the equity measures, though some have demanded even stricter protections or a complete overhaul of the existing administrative structures to ensure the regulations' objectives are met without political interference.

== Challenge to constitutionality ==
In addition to street demonstrations, the Supreme Court has admitted a Public Interest Litigation challenging the constitutional validity of the regulations and has stayed the implementation of the regulations. The petitioners claim that the regulations are unconstitutional on grounds that they violate articles 14, 15 and 21 of the Constitution and could be misused to target specific sections of the academic community. Security was increased at several university gates and protest sites following reports of minor clashes between opposing student groups.

== See also ==
- Mandal Commission
- Criminal Tribes Act
