= 2026 Kolkata Durga Puja crowd crush =

Crowd crush in Kolkata, India

- Chorbagan Sarbojonin Puja in 2023
- Date: 17 October 2026
- Location: Chorebagan Sarbojanin Durga Puja pandal, Kolkata, West Bengal, India
- Cause: Crowd surge amid rainfall, according to police
- Deaths: 19
- Injuries: 35
- Inquiries: Under investigation

On 17 October 2026, 19 people were killed and 35 injured in a crowd crush at Chorbagan Durga Puja pandal in Kolkata, West Bengal, India.

== Background ==
The Chorebagan Sarbojanin Durga Puja pandal is located in North Kolkata, within the area of the Girish Park police station. The puja pandal had been in its 91st year of operation at the time of the crush. The 2026 theme was "Beyond Sound". According to the Press Trust of India, prior to the crush, the West Bengal state government had had awarded the pandal the 2026 Best of the Best Durga Puja award. It had also won awards for lighting, environment-friendliness, and best pandal.

Per The Indian Express, the pandal's entrance was a dark cage-like corridor built with "heavy iron rods and a tight mesh." The statue of Durga, obscured by "thick bars" from a distance, would only become more readily visible as visitors progressed through the corridor.

The few police officers sent to the pandal for crowd control were positioned around the VIP entrances, leaving the Home Guards, civilian volunteers, and security guards to manage the crowds. These personnel could not effectively manage the crowd: they were too few in number and lacked crowd-control training.

== Incident ==
Per a Kolkata Police press release, the crowd crush occurred at the Sarada Park exit gate of the pandal at approximately 7:40 pm Indian Standard Time (UTC+05:30), though an eyewitness account reported by the Hindustan Times alternatively placed it around ten minutes earlier. The sudden onset of rain sent an influx of people waiting outside into the pandal, surging through the entry and exit gates. This compounded the crowd with those inside, causing a bottleneck. To escape the crush, many fled through the entrance gate.

According to a survivor interviewed by Indo-Asian News Service, two people fell in the dark and additional people fell on top of them. The first fall was about 11 feet (3.4 m) away from the exit gate. Per the Kolkata Police's preliminary findings released on 29 October, the crush was caused by congestion around the exit gate, after several women had gathered there and stayed in the pandal to avoid the rain, which they feared would ruin their clothing and makeup.

=== Casualties ===
Thirteen of the nineteen victims were women, and four were children; the youngest victim was a 13-year-old boy from Agarpara. Many of the victims had travelled from outside the city to participate in Kolkata's Durga Puja festivities. Twenty-five people were injured, and, as of 18 October 2026, three have been admitted to the ICU. One of the three was reported to be in critical condition due to crush syndrome.

== Response ==
On the night of 17 October, the Kolkata Police detained 14 people involved in the management of the pandal, including the president and vice-president of the pandal organisation committee and members of the private security agency hired for the event. Seven of those 14 were later formally arrested.

West Bengal chief minister Suvendu Adhikari announced compensation of ₹2,500,000 (US$26,000) and a Group D government job for a family member of each person killed. The state government also announced that it would cover the medical expenses of those injured at a hospital of their choice and provide ₹500,000 (US$5,200) to each injured person. Prime Minister Narendra Modi separately announced ex-gratia payments of ₹200,000 (US$2,100) for the next of kin of each deceased person and ₹50,000 (US$520) for each injured person, to be paid from the Prime Minister's National Relief Fund.
