= Fattu Dhinga =

- Village
- Location in Punjab, India Fattu Dhinga (India)
- Coordinates: 31.147130°N 75.341218°E
- Country: India
- State: Punjab
- District: Kapurthala

Government
  - Type: Panchayati raj (India)
  - Body: Gram panchayat

Population (2011)
  - Total: 3,174
- Sex ratio 1638/1536♂/♀

Languages
  - Official: Punjabi
  - Other spoken: Hindi
- Time zone: UTC+5:30 (IST)
- PIN: 144601
- Telephone code: 01822
- ISO 3166 code: IN-PB
- Vehicle registration: PB-09
- Website: kapurthala.gov.in

Fattu Dhinga is a village in Kapurthala district of Punjab State, India. It is located 16 kilometres (9.9 mi) from Kapurthala and 5 km the village Surkhpur which is both district and sub-district headquarters of Fattu Dhinga. The village is administrated by a Sarpanch who is an elected representative of the village.

== Demography ==
According to the 2011 of Census India, Fattu Dhinga had 597 houses and a population of 3,174 of which 1,638 people were male and 1,536 female. The literacy rate was 71.76%, lower than the state average of 75.84%. The population of children under the age of 6 years was 359 (11.31% of the total population) and the child sex ratio was approximately 860, which was higher than the state average of 846.

At that time, 1,161 people were engaged in work activities, being 924 males and 237 females. 21.52% of the population were Scheduled Castes and there were no Scheduled Tribes present.

== Air travel connectivity ==
The closest airport to the village is Sri Guru Ram Dass Jee International Airport.
