= Sheel Nagu =

Judge of Supreme Court of India

Hon'ble Justice Sheel Nagu
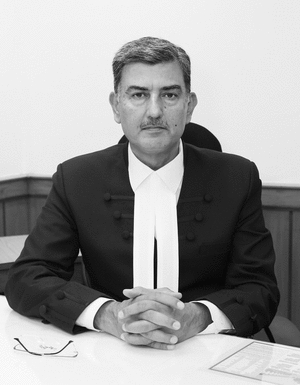

Judge of Supreme Court of India
- Incumbent
- Assumed office 2 June 2026
- Nominated by: Surya Kant
- Appointed by: Droupadi Murmu

36th Chief Justice of Punjab and Haryana High Court
- In office 9 July 2024 – 1 June 2026
- Nominated by: D. Y. Chandrachud
- Appointed by: Droupadi Murmu
- Preceded by: Ravi Shankar Jha; Ritu Bahri (acting); G. S. Sandhawalia (acting)
- Succeeded by: A. K. Mishra

Judge of Madhya Pradesh High Court
- In office 27 May 2011 – 8 July 2024
- Nominated by: S. H. Kapadia
- Appointed by: Pratibha Patil
- Acting Chief Justice
- In office 25 May 2024 – 8 July 2024
- Appointed by: Droupadi Murmu
- Preceded by: Ravi Malimath
- Succeeded by: Suresh Kumar Kait; Sanjeev Sachdeva (acting)

Personal details
- Born: 1 January 1965 (age 61)
- Education: B.Com and LL.B

Sheel Nagu (born 1 January 1965) is an Indian jurist and currently a judge of the Supreme Court of India since 02 June 2026. He served as the 36th Chief Justice of Punjab and Haryana High Court from 9 July 2024. He is a former judge of Madhya Pradesh High Court, where he has also served as the Acting Chief Justice.

== Education and background ==
Nagu was born on 1 January 1965, he laid his educational foundation by earning a Bachelor of Commerce degree before pursuing his passion for the legal profession, eventually obtaining his Bachelor of Laws. He officially entered the legal field upon enrolling as an advocate on 5 October 1987. Over the next twenty-four years, he established a highly successful and diverse private practice, primarily appearing before the High Court of Madhya Pradesh at Jabalpur. During his lengthy career at the bar, he gained a stellar reputation for handling complex litigations across multiple legal domains, including civil, constitutional, service, labour, and criminal matters.

== Career ==
His transition to the judiciary began when he was elevated to the bench as an Additional Judge of the Madhya Pradesh High Court on 27 May 2011. Demonstrating deep legal acumen, he was made a permanent judge of the same court on 23 May 2013. Over his long and distinguished tenure in Madhya Pradesh, he authored more than 499 judgements and handed down several landmark rulings and eventually assumed the role of Acting Chief Justice of that court on 25 May 2024 following retirement of the then Chief justice of Madhya Pradesh High Court Ravi Malimath. Shortly after, his leadership and legal expertise led to his appointment as the 36th permanent Chief Justice of the High Court of Punjab and Haryana, where he took his official oath of office on 9 July 2024 though his appointment was recommended in December 2023 by the collegium. Justice Nagu served at the helm of the Punjab and Haryana High Court until his stellar track record earned him the ultimate judicial elevation. He was officially sworn in as a Judge of the Supreme Court of India on 2 June 2026.

== Role in Yashwant Varma inquiry committee ==
Nagu served as the head of the high-profile three-judge in-house inquiry committee constituted by the Supreme Court of India on 22 March 2025. The panel was tasked with investigating serious corruption allegations against Justice Yashwant Varma, a sitting judge of the Delhi High Court, following a controversial ''cash at home" discovery. A sudden fire at Justice Varma's official residence had inadvertently led authorities to find massive, unaccounted heaps of burning cash.

Then-Chief Justice of India Sanjiv Khanna appointed Justice Nagu, then-Chief Justice of the Punjab and Haryana High Court, to lead the committee alongside Justice G. S. Sandhawalia and Justice Anu Sivaraman. The Supreme Court ensured transparency by releasing evidence and suspending Justice Varma from judicial duties. Following a thorough ten-day investigation involving site visits and witness testimonies, the panel submitted its report on 4 May 2025. The findings, which linked the cash to Justice Varma's residence, led to a recommendation for his removal and significantly impacted Justice Nagu's career, leading to his elevation to the Supreme Court
