= Punjabi kabaddi =

Indian sport

Punjabi Kabaddi
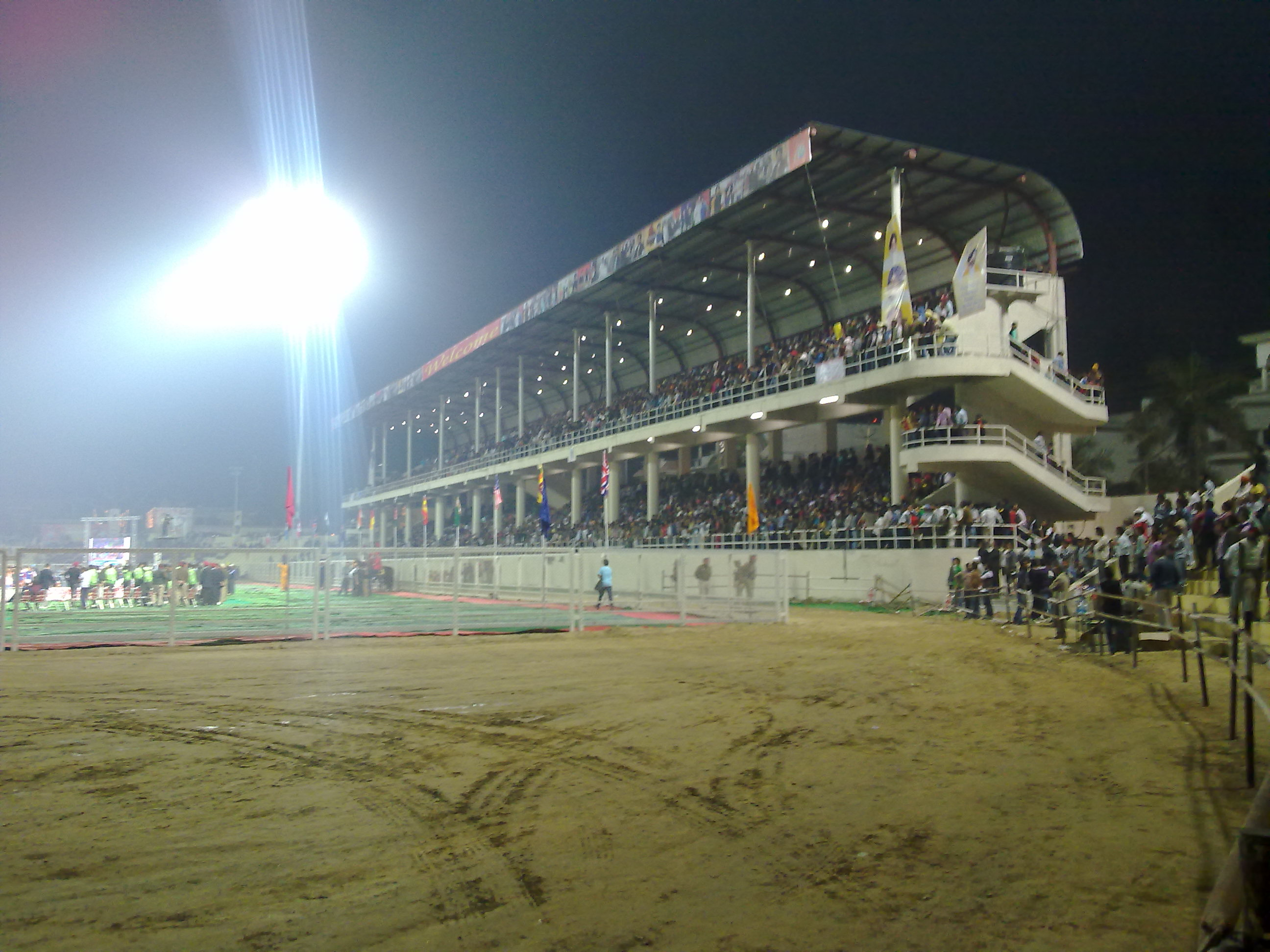
- Kabaddi at the Guru Gobind Singh Stadium
- Nicknames: Circle style kabaddi
- Clubs: DAV Kabaddi club Jalandhar

Characteristics
- Contact: Yes
- Team members: From 8 to 20 players
- Equipment: Knickers
- Venue: Circular pitch

Presence
- Country or region: Punjab region of the Indian subcontinent

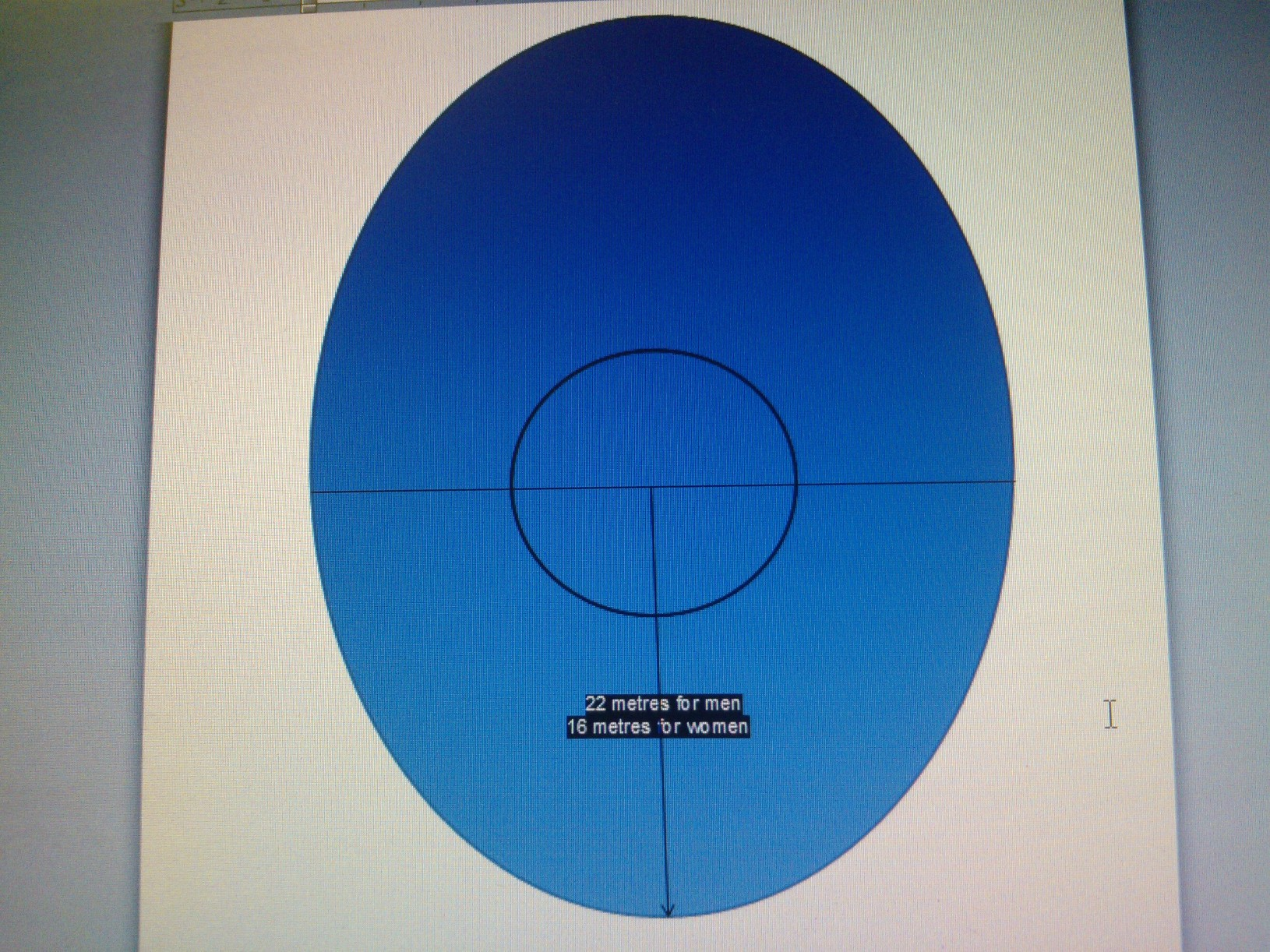
Circle style kabaddi ground

Punjabi Kabaddi, also called Circle Style Kabaddi, is a contact sport that originated in the Punjab region, in the northern part of the Indian subcontinent. There are a number of traditional Punjabi kabaddi styles traditionally played in the Punjab region. Similar to standard kabaddi, circle style kabaddi is also played at state and international levels. Starting in 2010, the Punjab government has periodically administered an international tournament called the (circle style) Kabaddi World Cup, which has always been won by the India national team, except the 2020 tournament, which was played in Pakistan and won by Pakistan.

== Name ==
The term kabaddi may be derived from the Punjabi word kauddi (Punjabi: ਕੌਡੀ) which is chanted to play kauddi or, it is derived from "katta" (calf) (Punjabi: ਕੱਟਾ) and kauddi (to chopped) (Punjabi: ਵੱਢੀ) which together has become kauddi.

== Traditional Punjabi kabaddi styles ==
=== Lambi kauddi ===
In lambi kauddi (Punjabi: لمبی کوڈی/ਲੰਬੀ ਕੌਡੀ) there are 15 players with a circular pitch of 15–20 feet. There is no outer limit. The players can run as far they can. There is no referee. The raider will say "kauddi, kauddi" throughout the attack.

=== Saunchi kauddi ===
Saunchi kauddi (Punjabi: سانچی کوڈی/ਸੌਂਚੀ ਕੌਡੀ) (also called Saunchi pakki/Punjabi: ਸੌਂਚੀ ਪੱਕੀ) can best be described as being similar to boxing. It is popular in the Malwa area of Punjab. It is unlimited players with a circular playing pitch. A bamboo with red cloth is dug into the ground which is paraded by the winner.

In sauchi kabaddi, the raider will hit the defender but only on the chest. The defender will then hold the raiders wrist. A foul is declared if any other part of the body is grabbed. If the defender holds the raiders wrist and restricts his movement, he will be declared the winner. If the raider loses the grip of the defender, then the raider will be the winner.

=== Goongi kabaddi ===
A popular style is Goongi kabaddi (Punjabi: گونگی کبڈی/ਗੂੰਗੀ ਕਬੱਡੀ) (silent kabaddi) where a raider player does not speak and say the word kabaddi but just touches the opponent's team player and the person he touches is the only player who will try to stop the raider. The struggle will continue until the raider reaches the starting line or acknowledges defeat and loses a point; if the raider safely reaches the starting line, he will get the point.

=== Other traditional styles ===
- Chhe handhi (Punjabi: ਛੈ ਹੰਧੀ)
- Shamiali wali (Punjabi: ਸ਼ਮਿਆਲੀ ਵਾਲੀ)
- Peer kauddi (Punjabi: ਪੀਰ ਕੌਡੀ)
- Parh kauddi (Punjabi: ਪੜ ਕੋੋੋਡੀ)
- Badhi (Punjabi: ਬਧੀ)
- Baithvi (Punjabi: ਬੈਠਵੀ)
- Burjia wali (Punjabi: ਬੁਰਜੀਆ ਵਾਲੀ)
- Ghorh kabaddi (Punjabi: ਘੋੜ ਕਬੱਡੀ)
- Daudhey (Punjabi: ਦੋਧੇ)
- Cheervi (Punjabi: ਚੀਰਵੀ)
- Chatta wali (Punjabi: ਚਾਟਾ ਵਾਲੀ)
- Dhair kabaddi (Punjabi: ਢੇਰ ਕਬੱਡੀ) popular in Majha area of Punjab
- Ambarsari (Punjabi: ਅੰਬਰਸਰੀ)
- Ferozpuri (Punjabi: ਫ਼ਿਰੋਜ਼ਪੁਰੀ)
- Lahori (Punjabi: ਲਾਹੌਰੀ)
- Multani (Punjabi: ਮੁਲਤਾਨੀ)
- Lyallpuri (Punjabi: ਲਾੲਿਰਪੁਰੀ)
- Bahwalpuri (Punjabi: ਬਹਾਵਲਪੁਰੀ)
- Ambalvi (Punjabi: ਅੰਬਾਲਵੀ.

== Punjab Circle style ==
=== Rules of Kabaddi ===
In the Punjab region, kabaddi is played on a circular pitch of a diameter of 22 meters and an inner circle with a line through the middle of the pitch: the pitch is called kaudi da bharha. There are two teams of 8 players; one on one raid; and no player leaves the field. If 2 stoppers attack a player, a foul is declared. Punjab style kabaddi does not require the raider saying "kabaddi, kabaddi" throughout the raid. The game lasts for 40 minutes with a change in sides after 20 minutes.

In the Punjab Circle Style form of Kabaddi, whenever any player is touched, by a raider the player that is touched has 30 seconds to stop the opposing player from reaching their side of the half if the raider is stopped the point is awarded to the defenders team but if the raider makes it back to their side the point is award for the raiders team. If a raider or defender I steps out of bounds a point is awarded to the other team.

== Notable competitions ==
=== Circle-style Kabaddi World Cup ===
The circle style Kabaddi World Cup, is an international kabaddi competition administered by the government of Punjab (India) and contested by men's and women's national teams. The competition has been contested every year since the inaugural tournament in 2010, except for 2015 due to the 2015 Guru Granth Sahib desecration controversy. The women's tournament was introduced in 2012. The current Champion 2020 of Punjabi Kabaddi is Pakistan who won the final against India in February.

=== Super Kabaddi League ===
Super Kabaddi League (SKL) is a professional-level kabaddi league in Pakistan. Its inaugural season was played from 1 to 10 May 2018 in Lahore. This league follows a city-based franchise model.[3] More than a 100 Kabaddi players from Pakistan and abroad were presented in the players' draft, which took place on 23 April 2018, in Lahore. International players from Sri Lanka, Iran, Bangladesh, and Malaysia participated in the inaugural edition.

=== Women's Kabaddi World Cup ===
The first Women's Kabaddi World Cup was held in Patna, India in 2012. India won the championship, defeating Iran in the finals. India retained the title in 2013, defeating debutants New Zealand in the finals.

=== Asia Kabaddi Cup ===
The Asia Kabaddi Cup has been held twice in consecutive years. The inaugural tournament was held in 2011 in Iran. In 2012, the Asia Kabaddi Cup was held in Lahore, Pakistan, from 1 to 5 November. In the 2012 Asia Kabaddi Cup, Pakistan won against India with a technical win after the Indian team forfeited the match following a dispute.

=== UK Kabaddi Cup ===
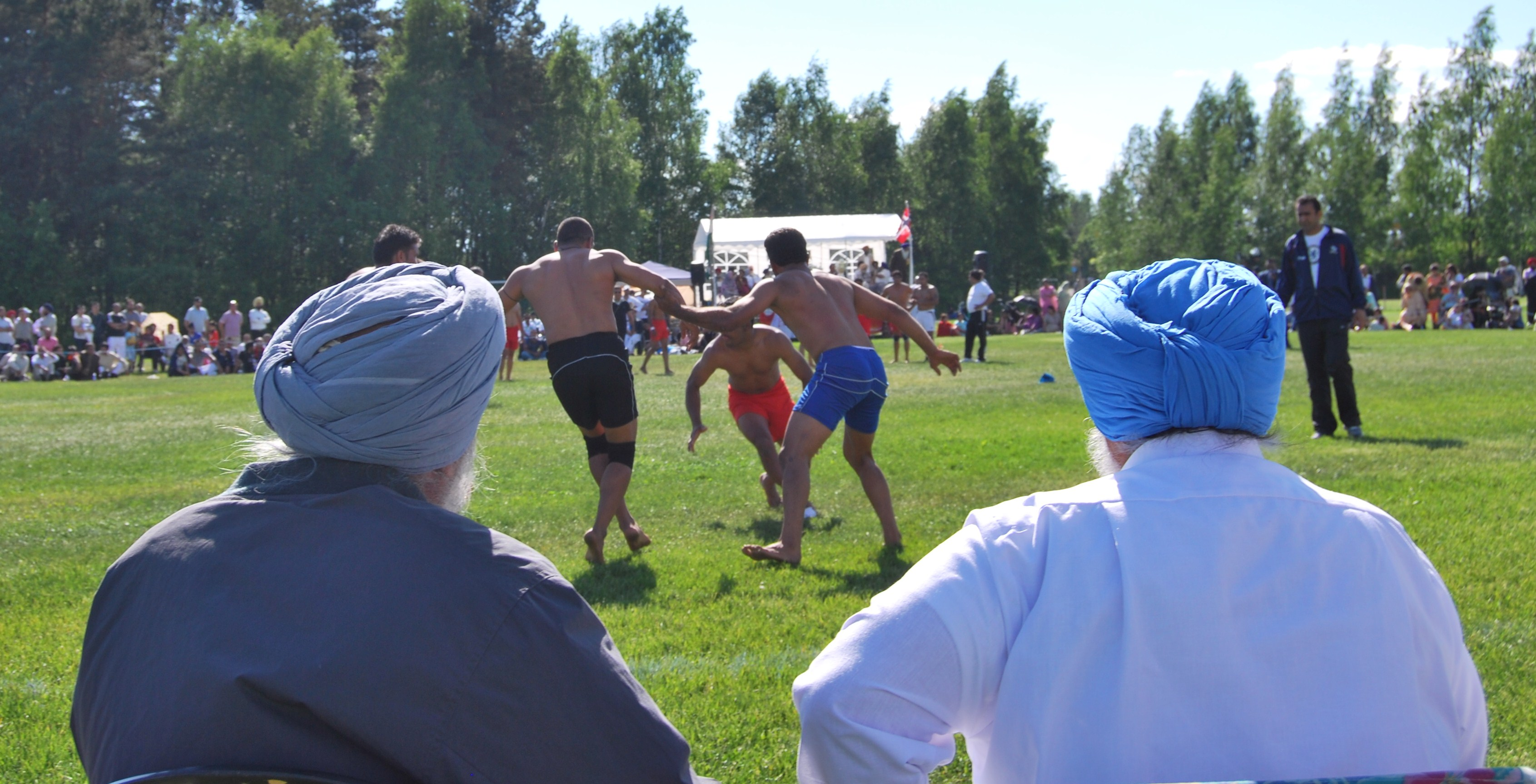
Punjab Circle Style match in Canada

Kabaddi received major recognition in the United Kingdom during the 2013 UK Kabaddi Cup. It featured the national kabaddi teams from India, England, Pakistan, the United States, Canada, and a local club team sponsored by SGPC. The UK Kabaddi Cup hosts the Punjab circle style of kabaddi.

=== World Kabaddi League ===
World Kabaddi League was a short-lived professional league formed in 2014 that held only one tournament before folding. The league included eight teams from four countries – Canada, England, Pakistan, and the United States – and played the Punjabi circle style of kabaddi. Some of the teams were owned or part owned by actors – Akshay Kumar (Khalsa Warriors), Rajat Bedi (Punjab Thunder), Sonakshi Sinha (United Singhs) and Yo Yo Honey Singh (Yo Yo Tigers). The inaugural (and only) league season was played from August 2014 to December 2014. United Singhs (Birmingham, England) won the finals defeating Khalsa Warriors (London, England).

== Local tournaments ==
There are over 1,000 kabaddi tournaments held in Punjab, some of which include the following

- Rurka Kalan Kabaddi tournament
- Udham Singh Kabaddi Cup, Fattu Dhinga (Kapurthala).
- Baba Hastana Singh Kabaddi tournament, Khiranwali (Kapurthala).
- Hakimpur Kabaddi Games.
- Mothada Kalan Kabaddi tournament.
- Sant Maharaj Ishar Singh Ji Rara Sahib Kabaddi tournament
- Sant baba ram saroop kabaddi cup, Pipli (Faridkot)
- Gholia kalan kabaddi cup, Moga District
- Badowal kabaddi cup, Ludhiana District
- Dirba kabaddi cup

== See also ==
- India national kabaddi team
- Kabaddi at the Asian Games
- Kho kho
- Tag (game)
- 2013 Kabaddi World Cup
- Sports in Punjab, India
