= Madhya Pradesh Tourism Development Corporation =

State-owned body in an Indian state

Logo of MPSTDC

The Madhya Pradesh State Tourism Development Corporation (MPSTDC) is a government agency that conducts and regulates the tourism activities of the Indian state of Madhya Pradesh. MPSTDC established in 1978. The MPSTDC is headquartered at Bhopal and has offices across all the districts of Madhya Pradesh. The agency also operates homestays, hotels, resorts, and tourist rest houses in different key locations within the state. The department has the official slogan The Heart of Incredible India.
