= List of administrators of Dadra and Nagar Haveli =

Dadra and Nagar Haveli are in western India.

Dadra and Nagar Haveli were both liberated in 1954 by Indian nationalists but the union territory of Dadra and Nagar Haveli was not declared till 1961. Technically speaking, it is only after that, that Dadra and Nagar Haveli became part of India. Usually, the administrator of Dadra and Nagar Haveli also acted as the administrator of Daman and Diu. The union territory of Dadra and Nagar Haveli was merged with the nearby territory of Daman and Diu to create the new union territory of Dadra and Nagar Haveli and Daman and Diu on 26 January 2020 and the office of Administrator of Dadra and Nagar Haveli was abolished on that date.

== Prime Minister (de facto) ==
After Dadra and Nagar Haveli liberated IAS officer Kishinchand Gobindram Badlani was appointed Prime Minister of the territory on August 11, 1961. As a prime minister, he had signed an agreement with then Prime Minister of India Jawaharlal Nehru cede the territory to India.

== Administrator ==
Name	Took office	Left office
R. V. Mudras	22 July 1954	24 July 1954
Jayantibhai Desai	22 July 1954	1 August 1954
Vishwanath Lawande	2 August 1954	15 August 1954
Atmaram "Appasaheb" Narsinh Karmalkar	15 August 1954	May 1955
Antoni Furtado	May 1955	17 October 1960
Kishinchand Gobindram Badlani	17 October 1960	8 June 1962
Tumkur Sivasankar	8 June 1962	2 September 1963
M.R. Sachdev	2 September 1963	8 December 1964
Hari Sharma	12 December 1964	24 February 1965
Kashinath Raghunath Damle	24 February 1965	18 April 1967
Nakul Sen	18 April 1967	16 November 1972
S.K. Banerjee	16 November 1972	16 November 1977
Pratap Singh Gill	16 November 1977	31 March 1981
Jagmohan	31 March 1981	30 August 1982
Idris Hasan Latif (acting)	30 August 1982	24 February 1983
Kershasp Tehmurasp Satarawala	24 February 1983	4 July 1984
Idris Hasan Latif (acting)	4 July 1984	24 September 1984
Gopal Singh	24 September 1984	18 July 1989
Khurshed Alam Khan	18 July 1989	25 March 1991
Bhanu Prakash Singh	25 March 1991	16 March 1992
K.S. Baidwan	16 March 1992	28 March 1994
Ramesh Chandra	28 March 1994	15 July 1995
S.P. Aggarwal	15 July 1995	26 June 1998
Ramesh Negi (acting)	26 June 1998	23 February 1999
Sanat Kaul	23 February 1999	23 April 1999
Ramesh Negi(acting)	23 April 1999	19 July 1999
O.P. Kelkar	19 July 1999	2003
Arun Mathur	2003	2006
R.K. Verma	2006	2009
Shri Satya Gopal, IAS	2009	2011
Shri. Narendra Kumar, IAS	2011	2012
B. S. Bhalla	28 August 2012	18 August 2014
Ashish Kundra	18 August 2014	13 March 2016
Vikram Dev Dutt	14 March 2016	3 October 2016
Madhup Vyas	4 October 2016	29 December 2016
Praful Khoda Patel	30 December 2016	26 January 2020

== See also ==
- Governors of India
- List of administrators of Dadra and Nagar Haveli and Daman and Diu
- List of administrators of Daman and Diu
