= SSR College of Education =

- Type: Public
- Established: 2007
- Parent institution: SSR Memorial Trust
- Academic affiliations: Savitribai Phule Pune University
- President: Mohanbhai Sanjibhai Delkar
- Vice-president: Abhinav M. Delkar
- Principal: Dr. Sarika Mahesh Patel
- Location: Sayli Road, Silvassa, Union territory of Dadra and Nagar Haveli and Daman and Diu, 396230, India; 20.250°N 73.032°E
- Website: ssreducollege.edu.in

SSR College of Education is a teacher training college located in Silvassa in the Union Territory of Dadra and Nagar Haveli and Daman and Diu. The late Mohanbhai Sanjibhai Delkar Lok Sabha MP established the college as one of four colleges in the SSR Memorial Trust including the SSR College of Arts, Science and Commerce. The foundation stone was laid by the Mohanbhai Sanjibhai Delkar in 2003.

The local administration has attempted to demolish the SSR College accommodation buildings housing 300 students. SSR Memorial Trustee Abhinav Delkar, the son of Mohan Delkar, stated that "over 350 police personnel had turned up outside our college with bulldozers on June 27, 2020 to demolish the structure. They stopped only when my father managed to get a stay from the court". On 11 March 2021 a senior Marine Drive police officer told the Times of India, "Some people were allegedly trying to destabilize a college trust property of Delkar’s, and were demanding money from him and pressurizing him to induct certain people as trustees".

The institute is approved by National Council of Teacher Education, Bhopal. Recognized by administration of Dadra and Nagar Haveli. The institute is affiliated to the Savitribai Phule Pune University (Formerly known as University of Pune), Pune.

== Courses ==
SSR College of Education undertakes education and training of students for the following course:

- Bachelor of Education (B.Ed.) (2 Years)
