= Dadra and Nagar Haveli Lok Sabha constituency =

Lok Sabha constituency in Dadra and Nagar Haveli and Daman and Diu

Coordinates: 20.27°N 73.02°E

Dadra and Nagar Haveli
- Lok Sabha constituency
- Interactive Map Outlining Dadra and Nagar Haveli Lok Sabha constituency

Constituency details
- Country: India
- Union Territory: Dadra and Nagar Haveli and Daman and Diu
- Established: 1967
- Total electors: 2,83,024
- Reservation: ST

Member of Parliament
- 18th Lok Sabha
- Incumbent Kalaben Delkar
- Party: BJP
- Alliance: NDA
- Elected year: 2024

Dadra and Nagar Haveli Lok Sabha constituency is one of the two Lok Sabha constituencies in the union territory of Dadra and Nagar Haveli and Daman and Diu. This constituency is reserved for the Scheduled Tribes.

== Members of Lok Sabha ==
Election	Member	Party
Before 1967: The seat did not exist
1967	Sanjibhai Rupjibhai Delkar	Indian National Congress
1971	Ramubhai Ravjibhai Patel	Indian National Congress
1977	Ramubhai Ravjibhai Patel	Indian National Congress
1980	Ramji Potla Mahala	Indian National Congress
1984	Sitaram Jivyabhai Gavli	Independent
1989	Mohanbhai Sanjibhai Delkar	Independent
1991	Mohanbhai Sanjibhai Delkar	Indian National Congress
1996	Mohanbhai Sanjibhai Delkar	Indian National Congress
1998	Mohanbhai Sanjibhai Delkar	Bharatiya Janata Party
1999	Mohanbhai Sanjibhai Delkar	Independent
2004	Mohanbhai Sanjibhai Delkar	Bharatiya Navshakti Party
2009	Natubhai Gomanbhai Patel	Bharatiya Janata Party
2014	Natubhai Gomanbhai Patel	Bharatiya Janata Party
2019	Mohanbhai Sanjibhai Delkar (Note: Died mid-term in 2021)	Independent
2021 (Note: by-poll)	Kalaben Delkar	Shiv Sena
2024	Kalaben Delkar	Bharatiya Janata Party

== Election results ==
=== 2024 ===
2024 Indian general elections: Dadra and Nagar Haveli
Party	Candidate	Votes	%	±%
BJP	Kalaben Delkar	121,074	58.89	▲25.21
INC	Ajit Rambhai Mahla	63,490	30.88	+27.78
BAP	Deepak Bhai Kurada	10,197	4.96	
BSP	Borsa Sandipbhai Shankarbhai	3,152	1.53	
Independent	Shaileshbhai Vartha	2,524	1.23	
NOTA	None of the Above	5,151	2.51	▼0.28
Margin of victory		57,584	28.01	▲2.15
Turnout		2,05,248	72.52	▼4.13
BJP gain from SS		Swing	▲25.21	

=== 2021 Bye-poll ===
A bye-poll was needed for this constituency due to the death of the sitting MP, Mohanbhai Sanjibhai Delkar on 22 February 2021.

Bye-Election, 2021 : Dadra and Nagar Haveli
Party	Candidate	Votes	%	±%
SS	Kalaben Delkar	118,035	59.53	▲57.52
BJP	Mahesh Gavit	66,766	33.68	−7.24
INC	Mahesh Kumar Balubhai Dhodi	6,150	3.10	−1.23
NOTA	None of the Above	5,531	2.79	+1.31
BTP	Ganesh Bhujada	1,782	0.90	+0.48
Margin of victory		51,269	25.86	
Turnout		1,98,391	76.65	
SS gain from Independent		Swing		

=== 2019 ===
2019 Indian general elections: Dadra and Nagar Haveli
Party	Candidate	Votes	%	±%
Independent	Mohanbhai Sanjibhai Delkar	90,421	45.44	
BJP	Natubhai Gomanbhai Patel	81,420	40.92	−7.96
INC	Prabhubhai Tokiya	8,608	4.33	−40.79
SS	Ankita Patel	4,000	2.01	
Independent	Deepakbhai Kurada	3,630	1.82	
Independent	Manoj Dayat	2,287	1.15	
BMP	Pravinbhai Janathiya	1,596	0.80	
Navsarjan Bharat Party	Rajeshbhai Halpati	1,160	0.58	
Independent	Dhirubhai Patel	1,120	0.56	
BSP	Ishwarbhai Dongarkar	948	0.48	
BTP	Bhikhlabhai Khulat	843	0.42	
NOTA	None of the above	2,950	1.48	
Majority		9,001	4.52	
Turnout		198,983	79.59	
Registered electors		250,021		
Independent gain from BJP		Swing		

=== 2014 General Elections ===
2014 Indian general elections: Dadra and Nagar Haveli
Party	Candidate	Votes	%	±%
BJP	Natubhai Gomanbhai Patel	80,790	48.88	+2.45
INC	Mohanbhai Sanjibhai Delkar	74,576	45.12	−0.75
NCP	Janiabhai C. Khulat	1,611	0.97	+0.97
NOTA	None of the Above	2,962	1.79	−−−
Majority		6,214	3.76	+3.20
Turnout		165,286	84.09	
BJP hold		Swing		

=== 2009 General Elections ===
2009 Indian general elections: Dadra and Nagar Haveli
Party	Candidate	Votes	%	±%
BJP	Natubhai Gomanbhai Patel	51,242	46.43	+30.87
INC	Mohanbhai Sanjibhai Delkar	50,624	45.87	+20.17
Independent	Laxmanbhai Navasubhai Mishal	5,711	5.17	+5.17
Independent	Bhikalya Vanshya Khulat	1,401	1.27	+1.27
BSP	Yohanbhai Bhadiyabhai Bij	1,385	1.25	+0.39
Majority		618	0.56	
Turnout		110,363	73.23	+4.19
BJP gain from BNP		Swing		

=== 2004 General Elections ===
In the 2004 Lok Sabha Elections, the constituency had 122,681 eligible voters, of whom 69.04% exercised their franchise. There were ten candidates. Election was conducted at 128 polling stations, and 84,703 valid votes were counted. Mohanbhai Sanjibhai Delkar of the Bharatiya Navshakti Party was elected by a margin of 12,893 votes.

2004 Indian general elections: Dadra and Nagar Haveli
Party	Candidate	Votes	%	±%
BNP	Mohanbhai Sanjibhai Delkar	34,665	40.93	
INC	Sitaram Jivyabhai Gavli	21,772	25.70	
BJP	Patel Anilbhai	13,178	15.56	
SS	Patel Uttambhai	5,823	6.87	
Independent	Ram Milan	8,785	1.27	
Independent	Patel Dhirubhai Sukarbhai	3,652	4.31	
NCP	Harishchandra Khulat	1,576	1.86	
Independent	Aminbhai Patel	1,213	1.43	
CPI(M)	Gimbhal Ladak	1,158	1.37	
SP	Sumitra Ramji Patel	941	1.11	
BSP	Patel Ganesh	725	0.86	
Majority		12,893	15.23	
Turnout		84,703	69.04	
BNP gain from BJP		Swing		

=== 1971 General Elections ===
- Ramubhai Ravjibhai Patel (INC) : 8,484 votes
- Samjibhai Rupjibhai Delkar (NCO) : 7,138

== See also ==
- Dadra and Nagar Haveli
- Daman and Diu (Lok Sabha constituency)
- List of constituencies of the Lok Sabha
