= Keith Vaz =

Former British Labour MP

The Right Honourable Keith Vaz
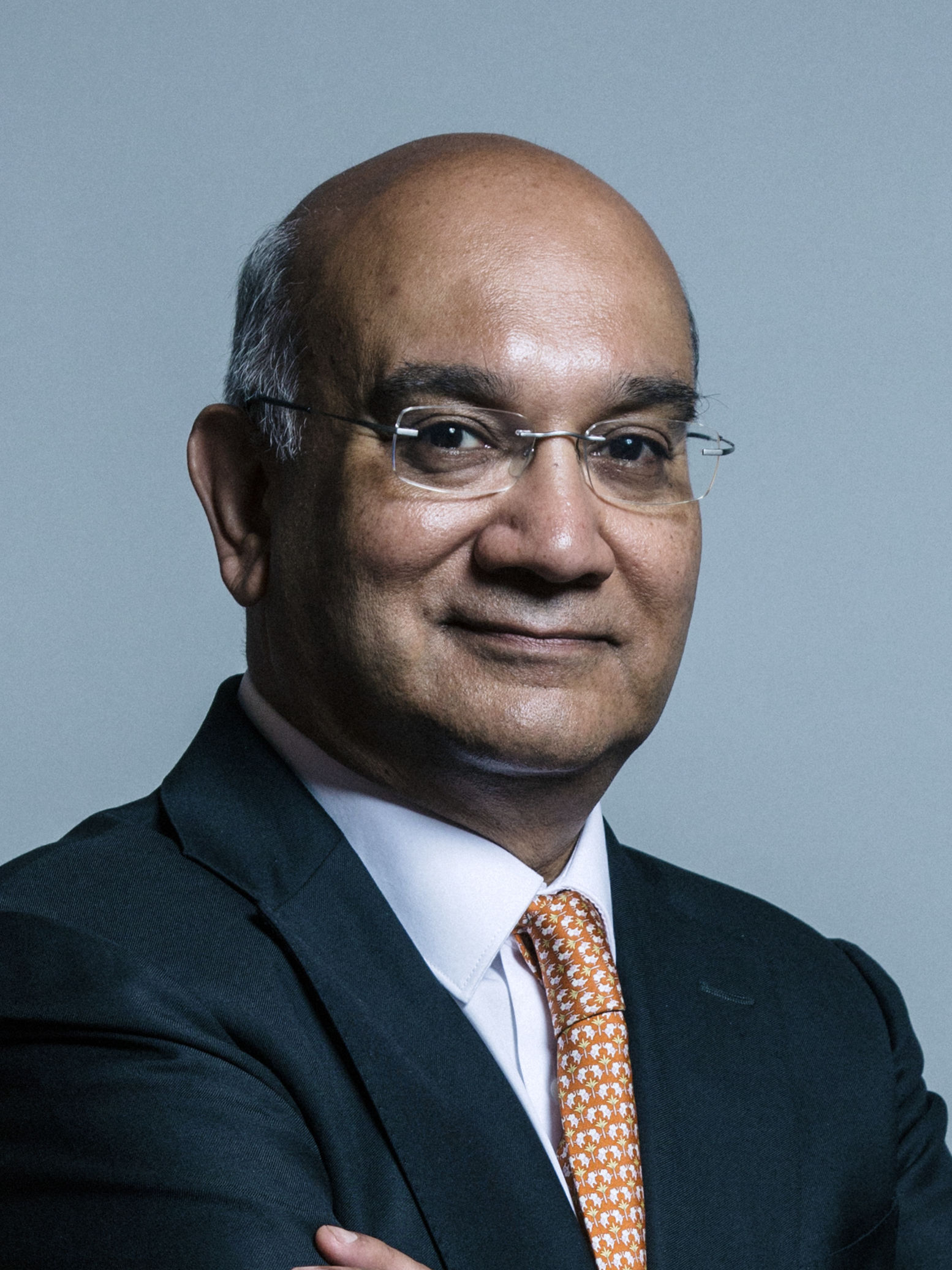
- Official portrait, 2017

Chairman of the Home Affairs Select Committee
- In office 26 July 2007 – 6 September 2016
- Preceded by: John Denham
- Succeeded by: Tim Loughton (acting)

Minister of State for Europe
- In office 9 May 1999 – 11 June 2001
- Prime Minister: Tony Blair
- Preceded by: Geoff Hoon
- Succeeded by: Peter Hain

Parliamentary Under-Secretary to the Lord Chancellor's Department
- In office 17 May 1999 – 28 July 1999
- Prime Minister: Tony Blair
- Preceded by: Geoff Hoon
- Succeeded by: David Lock

Member of Parliament for Leicester East
- In office 11 June 1987 – 6 November 2019
- Preceded by: Peter Bruinvels
- Succeeded by: Claudia Webbe

Personal details
- Born: Nigel Keith Anthony Standish Vaz; 26 November 1956 (age 69) Aden Colony (now Yemen)
- Party: One Leicester (since 2024); Labour (until 2024)
- Spouse: Maria Fernandes
- Relations: Valerie Vaz (sister)
- Children: 2
- Education: Gonville and Caius College, Cambridge (MA)

Nigel Keith Anthony Standish Vaz (born 26 November 1956) is a British politician who served as the Labour Party Member of Parliament (MP) for Leicester East for 32 years, from 1987 to 2019. He is the UK Parliament's longest-serving British Asian MP.

Vaz served as the Minister for Europe between October 1999 and June 2001. He was appointed a member of the Privy Council in June 2006. He was Chairman of the Home Affairs Select Committee from July 2007, but resigned from this role on 6 September 2016 after the Sunday Mirror revealed he had engaged in unprotected sexual activity with male sex workers and had said he would pay for cocaine if they wished to use it.

At the end of October 2016, Vaz was appointed to the Justice Select Committee; a parliamentary vote to block his appointment was defeated. On 10 November 2019, he said in a statement he would not be standing for re-election at the general election the following month.

He stood in the 2024 United Kingdom general election in Leicester East for the One Leicester party. He was consequently expelled from the Labour Party. He failed in his election bid, finishing fifth with 3,681 votes.

== Early and personal life ==
Keith Vaz was born in the British crown colony of Aden, on 26 November 1956, to Anthony Xavier and Merlyn Verona Vaz. The Vaz family hailed from Goa (then part of Portuguese India), now an Indian state, which accounts for his Goan-Portuguese surname. Vaz is a distant relative of Saint Joseph Vaz, a 17th-century missionary. He moved to England with his family in 1965, settling in Twickenham.

His father, previously a correspondent for The Times of India, worked in the airline industry, while his mother held jobs both as a teacher and simultaneously part-time in Marks & Spencer. Vaz's father took his own life when Vaz was 14. Merlyn Vaz moved to Leicester when her son was selected as prospective parliamentary candidate for the Leicester East constituency. She was elected to Leicester City Council as a Labour councillor and served on the council for 14 years.

While in Aden, Vaz was educated at St Joseph's Convent. In England, he attended Latymer Upper School, Hammersmith, followed by Gonville and Caius College, Cambridge, where he read law. He graduated from Cambridge University with a BA first-class Honours degree (1979), later promoted to MA (1987).

Vaz has two sisters, Valerie (born 1954), who has been the MP for Walsall South since 2010, and Penny McConnell, who is a solicitor. He lives in London with his wife, Maria Fernandes, and their two children, a son and a daughter.

== Early career ==
Before his political career, Vaz was a practising solicitor. In 1982, he was employed as a solicitor to Richmond upon Thames London Borough Council; and later as a senior solicitor to the London Borough of Islington. He was selected as the prospective Labour candidate for the Leicester East constituency in 1985. At that time, he found a job in Leicester as a solicitor at the City Council-funded Highfields and Belgrave Law Centre. He remained in this role until his election to Parliament in 1987.

== Political career ==
Vaz has been a Labour party member since 1982. In 1983, Vaz stood in the general election as the Labour candidate in the Conservative-Liberal marginal Richmond and Barnes constituency, coming third with a swing away from Labour of 4.3% compared with a national average swing away of 9.3%. He stood as the Labour candidate in the European Parliament election in 1984 for Surrey West, coming third.

On 11 June 1987, Vaz was elected as the Member of Parliament for Leicester East by defeating the sitting Tory MP Peter Bruinvels with a majority of 1,924. Three other Labour Party Black Sections members, Diane Abbott, Paul Boateng and Bernie Grant, entered the House of Commons at the same election.

Vaz was re-elected in 1992 (majority of 11,316), 1997 (majority of 18,422), 2001 (majority of 13,442), 2005 (majority of 15,867), 2010 (majority of 14,082), 2015 (majority of 18,352) and 2017 (majority of 22,428).

Vaz has held a variety of parliamentary posts. Between 1987 and 1992, he was a member of the Home Affairs Select Committee, of which he was the chair from July 2007 to September 2016. Between 1993 and 1994, he was a member of the Executive Committee Inter-Parliamentary Union. Finally, between December 2002 and July 2007, Vaz acted as a senior Labour Member of the Select Committee for Constitutional Affairs.

In 1992, Vaz was given the role of Shadow Junior Environment Minister with responsibility for planning and regeneration, his first frontbench role. In 1994, the Race Relations (Remedies) Bill, which had first been introduced by Vaz, became law with the support of the UK Government, and which allowed unlimited compensation to be given to those who had suffered racial discrimination. He remained in this position until 1997, when he was given his first Government post as the Parliamentary Private Secretary to the Attorney General and Solicitor General. Vaz then served as the Parliamentary Secretary to the Lord Chancellor's Department between May and October 1999. This was quickly followed by his appointment as the Minister for Europe, Foreign and Commonwealth Office. He served in this position from October 1999 and June 2001.

Other positions he held included as an elected member of the National Executive Committee and as the vice-chair of Women, Race and Equality Committee of the Labour Party. He held both of these positions since March 2007. Since 2000, he has been a patron of the Labour Party Race Action Group and in 2006 he was appointed the Chairman of the Ethnic Minority Taskforce.

Vaz was also appointed to a public bill committee, which held its first meeting on 15 November 2016, looking at the Criminal Finances Bill which aimed to tackle money laundering and corruption.

Vaz signed several early day motions sponsored by David Tredinnick MP supporting the continued funding of homoeopathy on the National Health Service.

Vaz supported Owen Smith in the 2016 Labour leadership election. He was a parliamentary supporter of Labour Friends of Israel.

Following the vote in October 2019 by MPs to endorse Vaz's suspension the Daily Telegraph published an article asking: "Why is Keith Vaz even in Parliament?" The article noted that: "He resigned as a minister in 2001, was suspended in 2002, named in the 2009 expenses scandal... His ability to survive certainly suggests something in our democratic system is broken."

On 10 November 2019, Vaz released a statement that he would not seek re-election at the 2019 United Kingdom general election that was held the following month. His six-month suspension meant he would have been subject to a recall petition which could trigger a by-election if supported by 10% of his constituents.

== Controversies ==
=== Rushdie affair ===
In March 1989, Vaz, a Catholic, led a march of several thousand Muslims in Leicester calling for Salman Rushdie's book The Satanic Verses (1988) to be banned, describing the march as "one of the great days in the history of Islam and Great Britain". According to Rushdie's autobiography Joseph Anton, Vaz had a few weeks earlier promised his "full support" to Rushdie, describing the fatwa against him as "absolutely appalling".

=== Leicester IRA attack ===
In February 1990, after the Provisional Irish Republican Army (Provisional IRA) carried out a bombing attack against a British Armed Forces recruiting centre in Leicester, Vaz caused public outrage by publicly suggesting that the military might have planted the bomb.

=== Filkin inquiry ===
In February 2000, the Parliamentary standards watchdog Elizabeth Filkin began an investigation after allegations that Vaz had accepted several thousand pounds from a solicitor, Sarosh Zaiwalla, which he had failed to declare. The allegations were made by Andrew Milne, a former partner of Zaiwalla, and were denied by both Vaz and Zaiwalla. He was censured for a single allegation – that he had failed to register two payments worth £4,500 in total from Zaiwalla. Vaz was accused of blocking Filkin's investigation into the allegations.

=== Hinduja affair ===
In January 2001, immigration minister Barbara Roche revealed in a written Commons reply that Vaz, along with Peter Mandelson and other MPs, had contacted the Home Office about the Hinduja brothers. She said that Vaz had made inquiries about when a decision on their application for citizenship could be expected.

On 25 January, Vaz had become the focus of Opposition questions about the Hinduja affair and many parliamentary questions were tabled, demanding that he fully disclose his role. Vaz said via a Foreign and Commonwealth Office (FCO) spokesman that he would be "fully prepared" to answer questions put to him by Sir Anthony Hammond, QC, who had been asked by the Prime Minister to carry out an inquiry into the affair.

Vaz had known the Hinduja brothers for some time; he had been present when the charitable Hinduja Foundation was set up in 1993, and also delivered a speech in 1998 when the brothers invited Tony and Cherie Blair to a Diwali celebration.

On 26 January 2001, Conservative MP John Redwood accused Prime Minister Tony Blair of prejudicing the independent inquiry into the Hinduja passport affair, after Blair declared that the FCO minister Keith Vaz had not done "anything wrong". On the same day, Vaz told reporters that they would "regret" their behaviour once the facts of the case were revealed. "Some of you are going to look very foolish when this report comes out. Some of the stuff you said about Peter, and about others and me, you'll regret very much when the facts come out", he said. When asked why the passport application of one of the Hinduja brothers had been processed more quickly than normal, being processed and sanctioned in six months when the process can take up to two years, he replied, "It is not unusual."

On 29 January, the government confirmed that the Hinduja Foundation had held a reception for Vaz in September 1999 to celebrate his appointment as the first Asian Minister in recent times. The party was not listed by Vaz in House of Commons register of Members' Interests, and Redwood, then head of the Conservative Parliamentary Campaigns Unit, questioned Vaz's judgement in accepting the hospitality.

In March, Vaz was ordered to co-operate fully with a new inquiry launched into his financial affairs by Elizabeth Filkin. Foreign Secretary Robin Cook, Vaz's superior, also urged him to answer fully allegations about his links with the Hinduja brothers. Vaz met Filkin on 20 March to discuss a complaint that the Hinduja Foundation had given £1,200 to Mapesbury Communications, a company run by his wife, in return for helping to organise a Hinduja-sponsored reception at the House of Commons. Vaz had previously denied receiving money from the Hindujas, but said that he made no personal gain from the transaction in question.

In June 2001, Vaz said that he had made representations during the Hinduja brothers' applications for British citizenship while a backbench MP. Tony Blair also admitted that Vaz had "made representations" on behalf of other Asians.

On 11 June 2001, Vaz was dismissed from his post as Europe Minister, to be replaced by Peter Hain. The Prime Minister's office said that Vaz had written to Tony Blair stating his wish to stand down for health reasons.

In December 2001, Filkin cleared Vaz of failing to register payments to his wife's law firm by the Hinduja brothers, but said that he had colluded with his wife to conceal the payments. Filkin's report said that the payments had been given to his wife for legal advice on immigration issues and concluded that Vaz had gained no direct personal benefit, and that Commons rules did not require him to disclose payments made to his wife. She did, however, criticise him for his secrecy, saying, "It is clear to me there has been deliberate collusion over many months between Mr Vaz and his wife to conceal this fact and to prevent me from obtaining accurate information about his possible financial relationship with the Hinduja family".

=== Suspension from House of Commons ===
In 2002, Vaz was suspended from the House of Commons for one month after a Committee on Standards and Privileges inquiry found that he had made false allegations against Eileen Eggington, a former policewoman. The committee concluded that "Mr Vaz recklessly made a damaging allegation against Miss Eggington to the Commissioner, which was not true, and which could have intimidated Miss Eggington or undermined her credibility".

Eggington, a retired police officer who had served 34 years in the Metropolitan Police, including a period as deputy head of Special Branch, wanted to help a friend, Mary Grestny, who had worked as personal assistant to Vaz's wife. After leaving the job in May 2000, Grestny dictated a seven-page statement about Mrs Vaz to Eggington in March 2001, who sent it to Filkin. Grestny's statement included allegations that Mr and Mrs Vaz had employed an illegal immigrant as their nanny, and that they had been receiving gifts from Asian businessmen such as the Hinduja brothers. The allegations were denied by Vaz, and the Committee found no evidence to support them.

In late 2001, Vaz complained to Leicestershire Police that his mother had been upset by a telephone call from "a woman named Mrs Egginton", who claimed to be a police officer. The accusations led to Eggington being questioned by police. Vaz also wrote a letter of complaint to Filkin, but when she tried to make inquiries Vaz accused her of interfering with a police inquiry and threatened to report her to the Speaker of the House of Commons. Eggington denied that she had ever telephoned Vaz's mother and offered her home and mobile telephone records as evidence. The Commons committee decided that she was telling the truth. They added: "Mr Vaz recklessly made a damaging allegation against Miss Eggington, which was not true and which could have intimidated Miss Eggington and undermined her credibility."

A letter to Filkin from Detective Superintendent Nick Gargan made it plain that the police did not believe Vaz's mother ever received the phone call and the person who came closest to being prosecuted was not Eggington but Vaz. Gargan said that the police had considered a range of possible offences, including wasteful employment of the police, and an attempt to pervert the course of justice. Leicestershire Police eventually decided not to prosecute. "We cannot rule out a tactical motivation for Mr Vaz's contact with Leicestershire Constabulary but the evidence does not support further investigation of any attempt to pervert the course of justice."

The complaints the committee upheld against Vaz were:

- That he had given misleading information to the Standards and Privileges Committee and Filkin about his financial relationship to the Hinduja brothers.
- That he had failed to register his paid employment at the Leicester Law Centre when he first entered Parliament in 1987.
- That he had failed to register a donation from the Caparo group in 1993.

It was concluded that Vaz had "committed serious breaches of the Code of Conduct and showed contempt for the House" and it was recommended that he be suspended from the House of Commons for one month.

Vaz was represented by his solicitor Sir Geoffrey Bindman.

=== Nadhmi Auchi ===
In 2001, it was revealed that Vaz had assisted Anglo-Iraqi billionaire Nadhmi Auchi in his attempts to avoid extradition to France. Opposition MPs called for an investigation into what one dubbed "Hinduja Mark II".

Auchi was wanted for questioning by French police for his alleged role in the Elf Aquitaine fraud scandal which led to the arrest of a former French Foreign Minister. The warrant issued by French authorities in July 2000 accused Auchi of "complicity in the misuse of company assets and receiving embezzled company assets". It also covered Auchi's associate Nasir Abid and stated that, if found guilty of the alleged offences, both men could face 109 years in jail.

Vaz was a director of the British arm of Auchi's corporation, General Mediterranean Holdings (GMH), whose previous directors had included Lords Steel and Lamont, and Jacques Santer. Vaz used his political influence on GMH's behalf; this included a party in the Park Lane Hilton to celebrate the 20th anniversary of GMH on 23 April 1999, where Lord Sainsbury presented Auchi with a painting of the House of Commons signed by Tony Blair, the Opposition leaders, and over 100 other leading British politicians. Lord Sainsbury later told The Observer that he did this "as a favour for Keith Vaz". In May 1999, Vaz resigned his post as a director after he was appointed a Minister. In a statement to The Observer, a GMH spokesman said that Vaz had been invited to become a GMH director in January 1999, yet company accounts showed Vaz as a director for the financial year ending December 1998.

Labour confirmed in May 2001 that Auchi had called Vaz at home about the arrest warrant to ask him for advice. A spokesman said that Vaz "made some factual inquiries to the Home Office about the [extradition] procedure." This included advising Auchi to consult his local MP. The spokesman stressed that Vaz acted properly at all times and was often contacted by members of Britain's ethnic communities for help. In a Commons answer to Liberal Democrat MP Norman Baker earlier the same month Vaz confirmed that "details of enquiries by Mr Auchi have been passed to the Home Office".

=== Campaign against video game violence ===
Following the February 2004 murder of a fourteen-year-old boy, Vaz asked for an investigation of the relationship between the video games and violence, saying the parents of the victim believed that the killer was influenced by the video game Manhunt (2003). Although the police dismissed the claim and the only copy found belonged to the victim, Tony Blair said the game was unsuitable for children and agreed to discuss with the Home Secretary what action could be taken. The sequel, Manhunt 2 (2007), described by the British Board of Film Classification as "distinguishable ... by its unremitting bleakness and callousness of tone", became the first video game banned by the BBFC in the UK for 10 years. Vaz said: "This is an excellent decision by the British Board of Film Classification, showing that game publishers cannot expect to get interactive games where players take the part of killers engaged in 'casual sadism' and murder."

Vaz has also criticised Bully, which had a pre-release screenshot showing three uniformed pupils fighting and kicking. In 2005, he asked Geoff Hoon: "Does the leader of the house share my concern at the decision of Rockstar Games to publish a new game called Bully in which players use their on-screen persona to kick and punch other schoolchildren?" Due to the controversy surrounding the Bully title, the game was released in the UK in 2006 under an alternative name, Canis Canem Edit, though the original title was restored when the game was re-released in 2008. Both releases of the game were rated 15 by the BBFC and were generally positively received by critics.

In October 2010, Vaz put down an early day motion noting that the 2009–10 Malmö shootings "have been associated with the violent video game Counter-Strike". The EDM also noted that the game had been previously banned in Brazil and also been associated with US College Campus massacres in 2007. It called on the Government to ensure the purchase of video games by minors was controlled and that parents were provided with clear information on any violent content.

=== Home Affairs Select Committee ===
In July 2007, Vaz was elected as the chair of the Home Affairs Select Committee. Select committee members are usually proposed by the Committee of Selection which, under the Standing Orders of the House, nominates members to select committees, but unusually Vaz was the only nomination made by Harriet Harman, Leader of the House of Commons and Lord Privy Seal. Harman argued that this was because there was not sufficient time to go through the usual procedure before the impending summer recess. The Chairman of the Committee of Selection told the House that the committee had been ready to meet earlier that week, but had been advised by the Government that there was no business for it to transact. Vaz replaced John Denham on 26 July 2007. Vaz was re-elected to the committee's chairmanship in June 2015.

==== Speculation over Counter-Terrorism Bill ====
Vaz's backing for the 42-day terrorist detention without charge "was seen as crucial by the Government". During the debate on 10 June 2008, the day before the key vote, Vaz was asked in Parliament whether he had been offered an honour for his support. He said: "No, it was certainly not offered—but I do not know; there is still time." The Daily Telegraph printed a hand written letter to Vaz, written the day after the vote, then Chief Whip Geoff Hoon wrote:

Dear Keith ... Just a quick note to thank you for all your help during the period leading up to last Wednesday's vote. I wanted you to know how much I appreciated all your help. I trust that it will be appropriately rewarded! ... With thanks and best wishes, Geoff.

Vaz wrote to the Press Council complaining the story was inaccurate, that the letter had been obtained by subterfuge and that he had not been contacted before the story was published. The complaint was rejected as the article made it clear that the reports of an honour were just speculation which Vaz had already publicly denied.

==== Conflict of interest ====
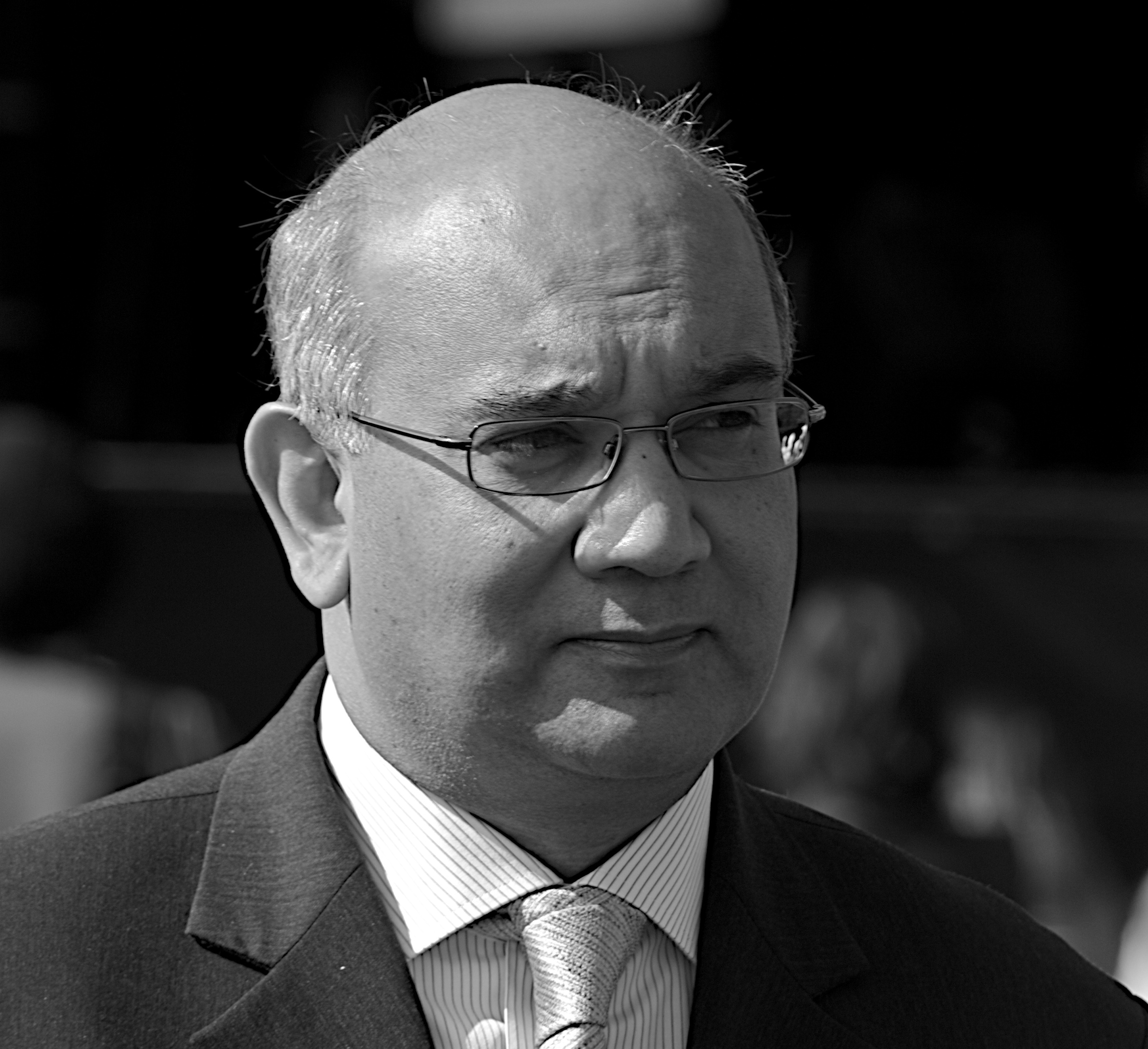
Vaz in 2008

In September 2008, Vaz faced pressure to explain why he failed to declare an interest when he intervened in an official investigation into the business dealings of a close friend, solicitor Shahrokh Mireskandari, who has played a role in several racial discrimination cases against the Metropolitan Police, and who was representing Assistant Commissioner Tarique Ghaffur in his racial discrimination case against Scotland Yard Commissioner Sir Ian Blair.

The Solicitors Regulation Authority began an investigation into Mireskandari's legal firm, Dean and Dean, in January 2008 after a number of complaints about its conduct. Vaz wrote a joint letter with fellow Labour MP Virendra Sharma to the authority's chief executive, Anthony Townsend, in February 2008 on official House of Commons stationery. He cited a complaint he had received from Mireskandari and alleged "discriminatory conduct" in its investigation into Dean and Dean. The Authority was forced to set up an independent working party to look into whether it had disproportionately targeted non-white lawyers for investigation.

Liberal Democrat deputy leader Vince Cable said that Vaz should make a public statement to clear up his role in the affair. "It is quite unreasonable that an independent regulator should have been undermined in this way. I would hope that the chairman of the Home Affairs Select Committee will give a full public statement."

==== Detention without charge inquiry ====
In September 2008, Vaz came under pressure when it was revealed that he had sought the private views of Prime Minister Gordon Brown in connection with the committee's independent report into government plans to extend the detention of terror suspects beyond 28 days. The Guardian reported that emails suggested that Vaz had secretly contacted the Prime Minister about the committee's draft report and proposed a meeting because "we need to get his [Brown's] suggestions". An email was sent in November 2007 to Ian Austin, Gordon Brown's parliamentary private secretary, and copied to Fiona Gordon, at the time Brown's political adviser. Another leaked email showed that Vaz had also sent extracts of the committee's draft report to the former Lord Chancellor, Lord Falconer, for his comments; according to Parliament's standing orders, the chairman of the Select Committee cannot take evidence from a witness without at least two other committee members being present.

Shami Chakrabarti, then director of human rights group Liberty, compared it to a judge deciding a case privately emailing one of the parties to seek their suggestions.

Vaz denied that he invited Brown to contribute, except as a witness to the committee.

=== Other issues and incidents since 2008 ===
==== Parliamentary expenses ====
Vaz's total expenses of £173,937 in 2008/2009 were ranked 45th out of 647 MPs, with office running costs and staffing costs accounting for 70% of this. The register of Member's interests shows that he owns the constituency office. His second home expenses, ranked 83 out of 647 at £23,831 in 2008/2009 were the subject of a Daily Telegraph article. Vaz who lives in Stanmore, a 45-minute journey time from Parliament, claimed mortgage interest on a flat in Westminster he bought in 2003.

In May 2007, after claiming for the flat's service and council tax, he switched his designated second home to his constituency office and bought furniture. The report into the Parliamentary expenses scandal by Sir Thomas Legg showed that 343 MPs had been asked to repay some money and Vaz was asked to repay £1514 due to furnishing items exceeding allowable cost. New expenses rules published by the Independent Parliamentary Standards Authority which came into force after the 2010 general election limit the second home allowance to £1,450 a month, i.e. the Westminster cost of renting a one bedroomed flat. Profits made on existing second homes will be recouped.

==== Patrick Mercer affair ====
Vaz was one of the members of the Commons who agreed to be on the all-party parliamentary group on Fiji proposed by Patrick Mercer MP as part of his paid advocacy for lobbyists. Mercer was recorded describing Vaz as "a crook of the first order", adding that he had "never met an operator like him ... I mean it's not always completely ethical but it's stunning, he is an operator". Such comments on Vaz and on other politicians were a reason for the Committee on Standards deciding that Mercer had brought the House of Commons into disrepute.

==== 2015 election campaign loudspeaker use ====
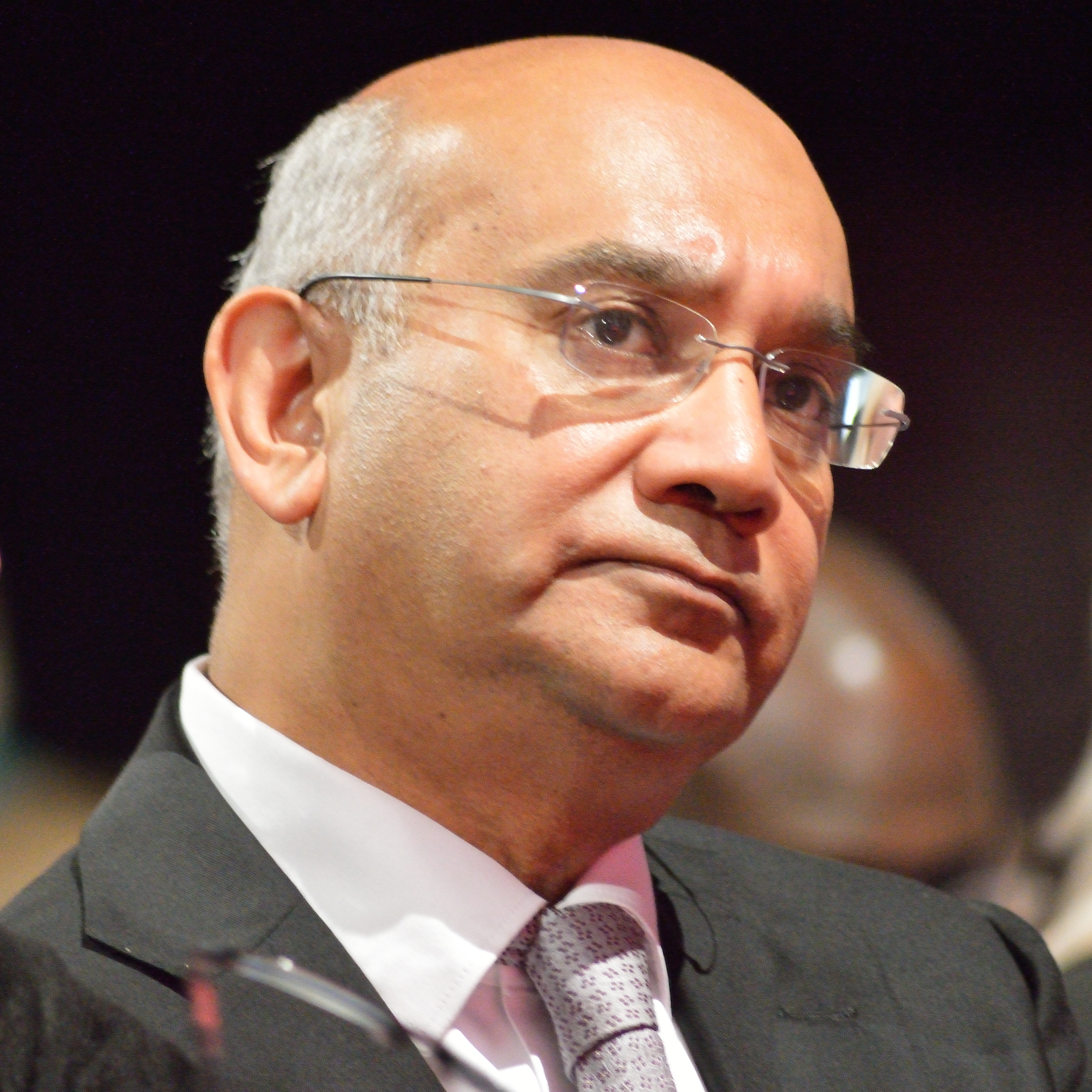
Vaz in 2016

In April 2015, a video showing Vaz speaking using loudspeakers from a campaign car caused a row with Leicester Conservatives. Using a loudspeaker on the street is an offence that carries a penalty of up to £5,000, and there is no exemption for political campaigning.

The incident was investigated by noise pollution officers of Leicester City Council, with officials confirming in June that it was illegal but that no action would be taken.

==== Male prostitute revelations ====
Allegations about Vaz were published by the Sunday Mirror in early September 2016. It was reported that he had engaged in unprotected sexual activity with male prostitutes and had told them he would pay for cocaine if they wished to use it. He told the prostitutes that his name was Jim and that he was an industrial washing machine salesman. Vaz later apologised for his actions. "It is deeply troubling that a national newspaper should have paid individuals who have acted in this way", he said. Vaz resigned as chair of the Home Affairs Select Committee on 6 September 2016.

At the end of October 2016, Vaz was appointed to the Justice Select Committee, after he had put himself forward and was nominated by his party. A House of Commons motion to block this development was defeated; motions of this kind are rare. According to Laura Hughes of The Daily Telegraph, Conservative Party whips told their MPs to vote for Vaz in the division to prevent a precedent being created of such appointments being rejected by MPs. Over 150 Conservative MPs voted in support of Vaz. The Conservative MP Andrew Bridgen asked in the chamber of Vaz; "If the right honourable member for Leicester East found himself last month to be not fit to be chair of the Home Affairs Select Committee and the matters are unresolved, what makes him think that he is a fit and proper person this month?"

The Parliamentary Commissioner for Standards, Kathryn Hudson, announced an investigation into Vaz's conduct. The Standards Commissioner's investigation was halted "for medical reasons" in December 2017. The inquiry recommenced in March 2018 and, in October 2019, under the stewardship of the new Parliamentary Commissioner for Standards, Kathryn Stone, the inquiry recommended that Keith Vaz be suspended from Parliament for six months. The inquiry report confirmed that, in her memorandum, the Commissioner had concluded "... it is more likely than not that Mr Vaz has engaged in paid sexual activity" and there was "evidence of Mr Vaz's apparent willingness to purchase controlled drugs for others to use". The Commissioner's memorandum also concluded Vaz "shows disregard for the law and that, in turn, is disrespectful to the House and fellow Members, who collectively are responsible for making those laws. Mr Vaz's conduct has also been disrespectful of the House's system of standards. He has not "co-operated at all stages" with the investigation process. He has failed, repeatedly, to answer direct questions; he has given incomplete answers and his account has, in parts, been incredible". On 31 October 2019, MPs voted in favour of the suspension.

==== Bullying allegations ====
Allegations were published in August 2018 by the BBC's Newsnight that a former Clerk of the House of Commons, Jenny McCullough, was bullied by Vaz as she was trying to uphold the Standards of the House. Among other allegations, McCullough alleged that Vaz made jokes about her being a security threat, on account of her Northern Irish background and accent. In September 2021, Parliament's standards commissioner and the Independent Expert Panel found the allegations to be credible, saying the bullying "was hostile, sustained, harmful and unworthy of a Member of Parliament"; the Panel concluded that Vaz should never be given a Parliamentary pass again.

==== Daman, India – Indigenous land clearing ====
Valuable seafront land along the 700 metres (770 yd) stretch from Moti Daman Lighthouse to Jampore beach is claimed to be owned by indigenous tribal fishing communities who have lived there for generations, as well as by NRI Damanese predominantly living in Leicester. In December 2018, local residents received documents instructed by State Administrator Praful Khoda Patel ordering the confiscation of their land and demolition of homes to make way for development. With 11,000 Damanese living in the Leicester East constituency, members of the community appealed to Keith Vaz, who flew out to Daman to meet Praful Patel. In January 2019 Vaz reported back:

"I believe that Mr Patel has a vision for Daman and he wants to develop it as a tourist and education centre. I was particularly impressed by the commitments made by Prime Minister Narendra Modi in order to enhance the development of Daman. Mr Patel promised that there would be no further demolitions until after the court has made its ruling and that he would talk to me about any further matters concerning this issue. I welcomed his constructive and positive approach."

However, by November, the bulldozing went ahead and the Daman protests began. On 3 November 2019, Daman Collector Rakesh Minhas issued a Section 144 order banning peaceful assembly of four or more persons, slogan-shouting and the use of loudspeakers across the entire district and ordered the conversion of two highschools into 'temporary jails'. Seventy protesters were held in these 'temporary jails' and another 8 arrests were made. Few of the adivasi fisherfolk were rehoused whilst most languished traumatised and homeless on the streets near the rubble of their razed homes. As of March 2021, the site is now billionaire Binod Chaudhary of CG Corp Global's Fern Seaside Luxurious Tent Resort, offering tent accommodation to tourists for £57 per night.

== After Parliament ==
Vaz was elected chairman of the Leicester East constituency Labour Party (CLP) in January 2020.

In 2020, he said of a petition entitled "Remove the Gandhi statue in Leicester", which alleged that Mahatma Gandhi was a "fascist, racist and sexual predator", "This is a dreadful petition that seeks to divide communities in Leicester and in the country. If this is not withdrawn I will certainly refer it to the police to consider whether it incites racial hatred."

Vaz is the founder of Silver Star Diabetes a Leicester based charity which promotes diabetes awareness. Through its Mobile Diabetes Units, the charity attends major community events and runs a weekly Diabetes Chai Chat with international experts. The charity has held camps in Bangladesh, Tunisia, Morocco, Yemen, Goa and Kolkata.

=== Attempt to return to Parliament ===
In October 2023, it was reported by The Guardian that he was considering running for Leicester East after being encouraged by allies. On 7 June 2024 it was announced that he would stand in Leicester East for the One Leicester party. He was consequently expelled from the Labour Party. He failed in his election bid, finishing fifth with 3,681 votes (7.9%).

Parliament of the United Kingdom
Preceded by Peter Bruinvels	Member of Parliament for Leicester East; 1987–2019	Succeeded by Claudia Webbe
Political offices
Preceded by Geoff Hoon	Minister for Europe; 1999–2001	Succeeded by Peter Hain
Party political offices
Preceded by Dianne Hayter	Socialist societies representative on the Labour Party; National Executive Committee; 2010–present With: Simon Wright (2010–2011); Conor McGinn (2011–2015); James Asser (2015–present)	Incumbent
