= SSRI (disambiguation) =

SSRI, or selective serotonin reuptake inhibitor, is a class of antidepressant medication.

SSRI may also refer to:

- Silver Standard Resources Inc., a stock symbol
- Social Security Retirement Income, in the United States
- Soviet Socialist Republic of Iran, also known as the Persian Socialist Soviet Republic
- Steinhardt Social Research Institute, at Brandeis University
- Soviet Union in Uzbek (Sovet Sotsialistik Respublikalari Ittifoqi) and Azerbaijani (Sovet Sosialist Respublikaları İttifaqı) (if spelled with an İ instead of I)

== See also ==
- SSR Institute of Management and Research, India
