= 2019 Daman indigenous land clearing protests =

Protests in Daman district, India

On 3 November 2019, Daman Collector Rakesh Minhas issued a Section 144 order banning assembly of four or more persons, slogan-shouting and the use of loudspeakers across the entire district of Daman, India and ordered the conversion of Government High School, Bhimpore and the Government Sarvottam High School, Moti Daman into 'temporary jails'. This was in response to a land ownership dispute between the local indigenous fishing community and the local administration that had confiscated their land and bulldozed their homes. The ensuing protest resulted with the detention of 70 protesters in the 'temporary jails' and another 8 arrests. Few of the adivasi fisherfolk were rehoused whilst most languished traumatised and homeless on the streets near the rubble of their razed homes.

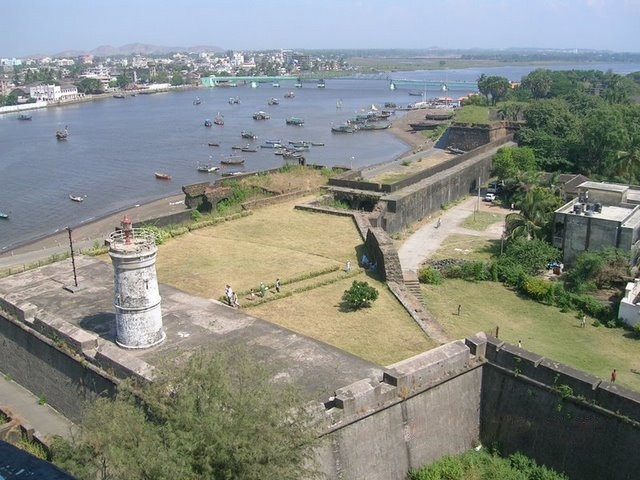
Harbour View from Moti Daman Fort

== Demolition of indigenous people's homes ==
Valuable seafront land along the 700-metre (2,300 ft) stretch from Moti Daman Lighthouse to Jampore beach is claimed to be owned by adivasi fishing communities who have lived there for generations as well as by NRI Damanese predominantly living in Leicester, UK.

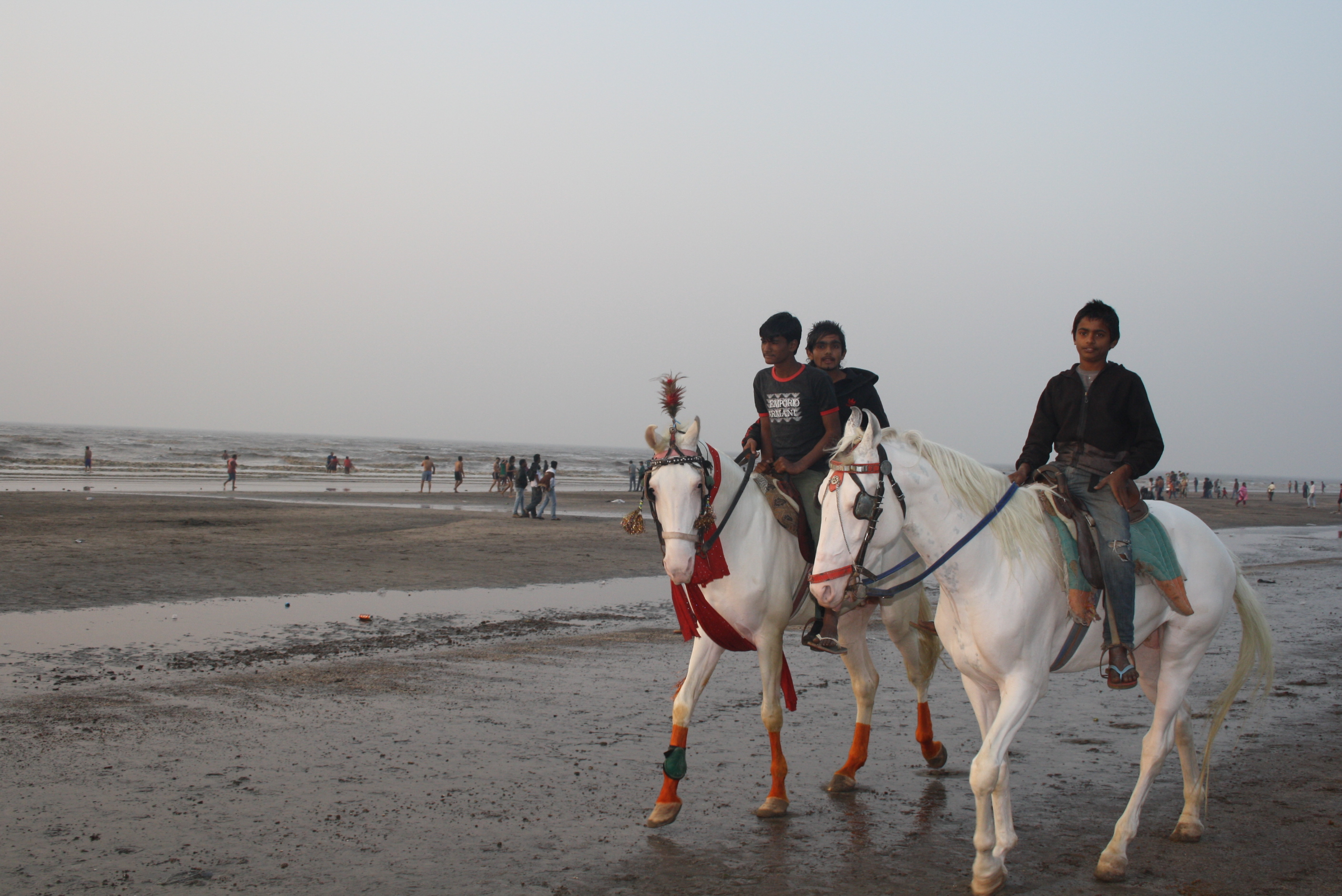
Jampore Beach in Daman

In December 2018, local residents received official looking documents purportedly instructed by Praful Khoda Patel ordering the confiscation of the land and ordering the demolition of the homes to make way for development.

With 11,000 Damanese living the Leicester East constituency, members of the community approached their MP Keith Vaz, who flew out to Daman to meet the Administrator Praful Khoda Patel. In January 2019 Vaz reported back that, "I had a very constructive discussion with Mr Patel. I believe that Mr Patel has a vision for Daman and he wants to develop it as a tourist and education centre. I was particularly impressed by the commitments made by Prime Minister Narendra Modi in order to enhance the development of Daman. Mr Patel promised that there would be no further demolitions until after the court has made its ruling and that he would talk to me about any further matters concerning this issue. I welcomed his constructive and positive approach."

On 1 November 2019 with Police assistance, Rakesh Minhas oversaw the bulldozing of around 90 homes that the local administration stated were illegally constructed.

== Protests ==
The newly evicted residents erupted in street protests prompting local MP Lalu Patel to write to the Collector requesting that they "be restored their homes at the very sites they were razed, on humanitarian grounds". Rakesh Minhas retorted that they may apply for a 20-year housing loan under PMAY-U. The following day people engaged in peaceful protest and sat on the road at Ram Setu area. Upon approach of the authorities the protesters demanded alternative houses or flats but the authorities spoke with them and convinced them to go away.

By 3 November, local residents joined the homeless families for peaceful protest near the football ground and shouted slogans critical of Collector Rakesh Minhas. Minhas responded by issuing a Section 144 order banning peaceful assembly of four or more persons, slogan-shouting and the use of loudspeakers across the entire district and ordered the conversion of Government High School, Bhimpore and the Government Sarvottam High School, Moti Daman into 'temporary jails'.

On Monday 4 November 2019 Rakesh Minhas called a press conference and announcing - "We have removed 90 houses that were built illegally on the coastal area on the road from Jampore to the lighthouse. Those who lost their houses can apply for houses at the Collector’s office under PMAY-U. We will also arrange for the cheapest loans to the beneficiaries... There are some houses under PMAY-U ready for which the affected families would be considered on priority." Authorities then used water cannons to disperse the protesters from the football ground. With the protesters unmoved police resorted to a violent lathicharge detaining protesters at the 'temporary jails'.

By the afternoon a large group of women protesters had gathered on the road at Ram Setu area. Police warned the protesters to leave but they didn't budge so police detained them with 70 people kept at the 'temporary jails' until evening. Eight were arrested under IPC 188, 143 and 149 and released on bail later.

The following day 25 Daman Municipal Council members with four Sarpanch from different villages travelled to meet Rakesh Minhas but were denied permission.

== Aftermath ==
The eviction victims were mostly vulnerable, uneducated, disabled, very old or very young and are left on the streets to fend for themselves. They were poorly positioned to assert their rights with many currently living on the streets near their demolished homes traumatised by their experience. The few that were offered alternative homes currently being built further inland from their demolished homes are required to pay towards the costs of the houses and monthly rent but do not have the means to do so.

The families affected have received exposure from the UK government registered human rights charity, Justice Upheld, who estimated that 200,000 people may be affected over time. They state that the local administration have no legal right to confiscate their land and demolish their homes. They were not consulted and no attempt was made to contact them. Their possessions were destroyed, notice was not given and legal process was not followed. Public and personal records prove the families are registered and they have been paying property tax for their land and properties to the Daman Municipal Council for generations. Their property ownership was again confirmed upon the granting of Aadhaar ID cards by the government requiring verification of identity and property ownership. Despite legitimate ownership the land is not formally registered on the Government's central land records and is ‘unregistered’ land and property and open to exploitation. Registration involves a formal investigation and a lengthy legal process which can be costly.

As of March 2021 the site is now The Fern Seaside Luxurious Tent Resort offering tourist accommodation for US$80/£57GBP/6000 rupees per night. Billionaire Binod Chaudhary, Nepal's wealthiest person, owns the Fern brand via his multi-national conglomerate CG Corp Global.

== Land Records Improvement Programmes ==
The Indian government has been trying to resolve the poor quality of land records since 1988 with little success. Digital India Land Record Modernization Programme was to resolve this but has experienced significant shortcomings. A huge number of land disputes are pending in the courts. Of the nearly one million (10 lakh) civil court cases were pending, 60 per cent are more than one year old, 34 per cent are over three years old and 20 per cent cases are over five years old.

== See also ==
- Food security
- Food sovereignty
- Illegal construction
- Land grabbing
- Land rights
- Land titling
- Sustainable development
- Water right
