= Mohanbhai Sanjibhai Delkar =

Indian politician (1962–2021)

Mohan Sanjibhai Delkar

Member of Parliament, Lok Sabha
- In office 23 May 2019 – 22 February 2021
- Preceded by: Natubhai Gomanbhai Patel
- Succeeded by: Kalaben Delkar
- Constituency: Dadra & Nagar Haveli
- In office 2 December 1989 – 18 May 2009
- Preceded by: Sitaram Jivyabhai Gavli
- Succeeded by: Natubhai Gomanbhai Patel
- Constituency: Dadra & Nagar Haveli

Personal details
- Born: 19 December 1962 Silvassa, Dadra and Nagar Haveli, India
- Died: 22 February 2021 (aged 58) Mumbai, Maharashtra, India
- Cause of death: Suicide by hanging
- Spouse: Kalaben Delkar
- Children: 2
- As of 20 October, 2019

Mohan Sanjibhai Delkar (19 December 1962 – 22 February 2021) was an Indian politician and tribal rights advocate, who was elected seven times as a member of Lok Sabha from Dadra and Nagar Haveli constituency, in the Union Territory of Dadra & Nagar Haveli and Daman & Diu. He had been part of Indian National Congress (INC), Bharatiya Janata Party (BJP) and Janata Dal (United) (JDU) at various times, and had also founded his own party Bharatiya Navshakti Party for some period.

== Political career ==
Mohan Delkar was born on 19 December 1962 to Sanjibhai Delkar. Sanjibhai was elected to Lok Sabha from Dadra and Nagar Haveli in 1967 as Indian National Congress candidate and joined Morarji Desai's NCO faction when the party split in 1969. He lost 1971 Lok Sabha election as NCO candidate.

Mohan Delkar started his career as a trade union leader in Silvassa and fought for the rights of tribal people working in different factories there. In 1985, he started Adivasi Vikas Sangathan for the tribal people. In 1989, he was elected to the 9th Lok Sabha from Dadra and Nagar Haveli constituency as an independent candidate. In 1991 and 1996 he was re-elected as an Indian National Congress candidate from the same constituency. In 1998, he was again elected to the Lok Sabha as a Bharatiya Janata Party candidate from the same constituency. In 1999 and 2004, he was re-elected to the Lok Sabha as an independent and the Bharatiya Navshakti Party (BNP) candidate respectively; a party that he had formed. On 4 February 2009, he re-joined the Congress. and in 2019 he distanced himself from the Congress and was elected as an independent politician. However, in 2020, he joined the Janata Dal (United) party.

== Educational and community projects ==
In July 2003, Delkar established the Svargiya Sanjhibhai Rupjhibai Memorial Trust (SSRMT), named after his father, with the mission to improve quality of higher education in the tribal region of Dadra & Nagar Haveli. The campus spread over 50 acres of land in Silvassa comprises four college that are affiliated with Pune University; SSR College of Arts, Science and Commerce, SSR College of Pharmacy, SSR College of Education and SSR Institute of Management and Research In 2018, Delkar gave part of the SSR Memorial Trust's land for a token rent of one rupee to the local administration for establishment of the fifth college, NAMO Medical Education and Research Institute. For the Adivasi tribal people to have community function spaces he built a community hall called Adivasi Vikas Bhavan at Jawhar.

== Death ==
=== Background ===
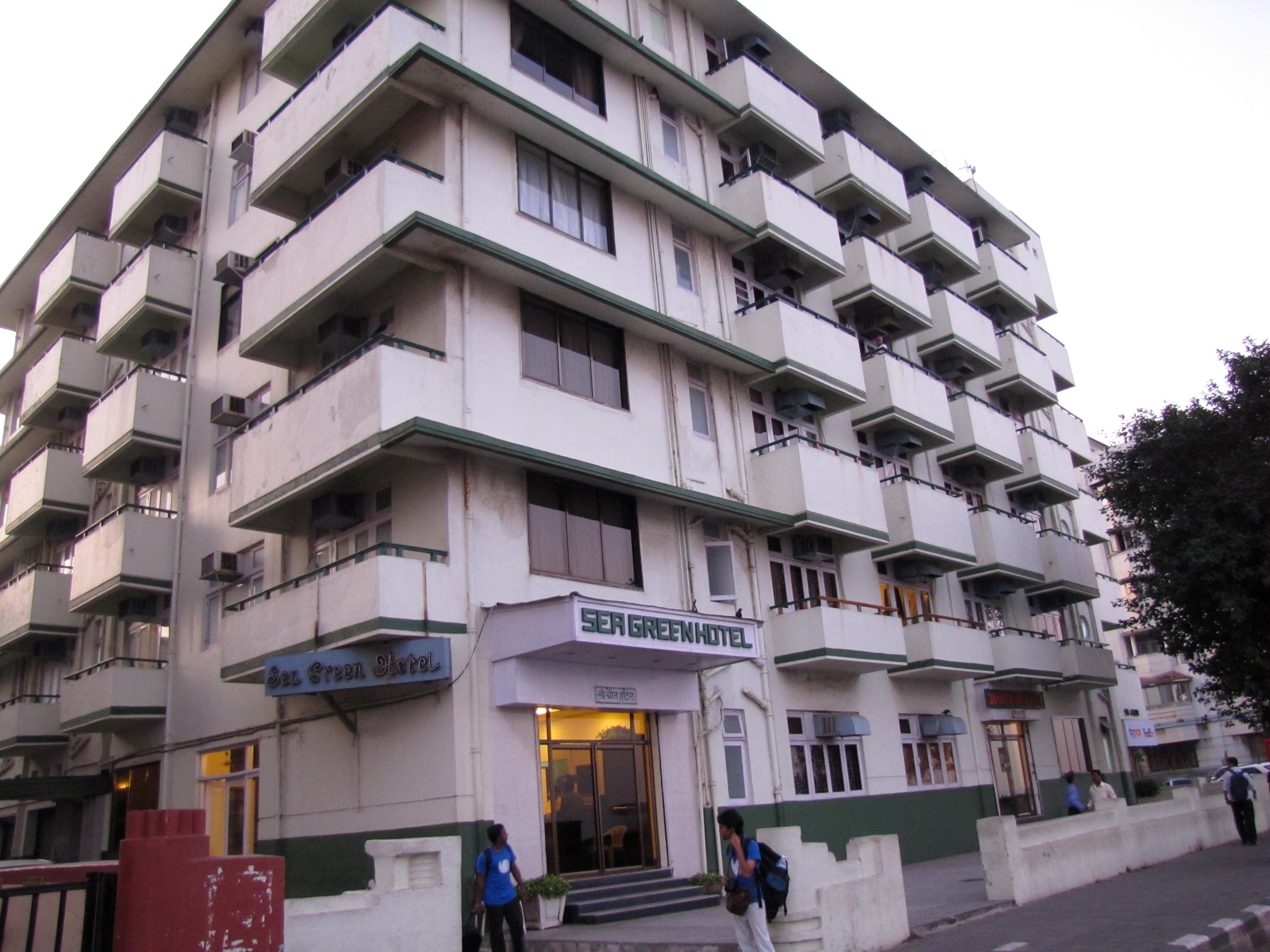
Sea Green Hotel, Mumbai

On 5 July 2020, Delkar posted a video on YouTube and Twitter threatening to resign as Lok Sabha MP claiming that local administration was tormenting him. Delekar stated, "All my efforts to get justice are blocked and stonewalled by these people. They are even trying to frame me in fake cases, my supporters, the organisations I run or work for are targeted and the people in it are also hounded." Delkar can also be heard saying that BJP leaders, the bureaucracy, police, investigating agencies, and local goons "were constantly harassing him at all levels." Sachin Sawant of Congress stated that an investigating officer had allegedly even told Delkar, "He has received an order from above".

On 19 September 2020 in parliament, he raised the issue of "misbehaviour" by local officials "as part of a conspiracy" claiming that on Liberation Day (2 August), he was "denied the right to address the people of the region as an MP". Abhinav Delkar, son of Mohan Delkar, stated that local administration had made things difficult for them and their supporters. He further stated that his father's supporters and tribal workers had been sacked from their jobs in a local government school because they had supported him in elections. He stated that attempts of demolishing the local university SSR College of Arts, Science and Commerce were made which his father managed to stop through a stay order from the court".

=== Suicide ===
Delkar travelled to Maharashtra, to attend a court hearing of one of his supporters who was previously held in judicial custody at Silvassa sub-jail for carrying out illegal liquor smuggling in name of running a hotel. Delkar hanged himself at the Hotel Sea Green, Mumbai on 22 February 2021, leaving a 15-page suicide note. The note held politicians and administrative officials responsible for "injustice", "insult" and "bias" meted out to him, and specifically named Praful Khoda Patel.

Maharashtra's Home Minister Anil Deshmukh sought "a probe into the BJP's role in Delkar's suicide", to check if he was being pressured by officials at the behest of the Central Government. Abhinav Delkar states that, "He knew that if he had to end his life here, the suicide note would have vanished and no case would have been registered".

On 25 February 2021, Abhinav Delkar wrote to the Prime Minister requesting for justice. Abhinav demanded that Praful Patel must be removed as administrator since he was facing allegations in the case of his father's death.

=== First Information Report ===
First Information Report (FIR) under Section 306 (abetment of suicide), 389 (Putting person in fear of accusation of offence, in order to commit extortion) and 506 (criminal intimidation) and sections of Scheduled Caste and Scheduled Tribe (Prevention of Atrocities) Act, 1989 was registered against Praful Khoda Patel, collector Sandeep Kumar Singh, former police superintendent Sharad Bhaskar Darade, deputy collector Apurva Sharma, sub-divisional officer Manasvi Jain, police inspector Manoj Patel, DNH Law Secretary Rohit P. Yadav, talathi Dilip Patel and BJP leader Fatehsinh V Chauhan who has a history of land grabbing disputes.

From 18 December 2020 to 19 January 2021, Mohan Delkar had made complaints against those named in the FIR to Prime Minister Modi, Home Minister Amit Shah, LS Speaker Om Birla, and Parliamentary Personnel, Public Grievances, Law and Justice committee chairman Bhupender Yadav. On 12 February 2021 Sunil Kumar Singh chaired a Lok Sabha Privileges Committee hearing where Delkar announced, "If harassment to me is not stopped, then I would be left with no option but committing suicide." Hours before the FIR was registered, Anil Deshmukh announced in the Vidhan Bhavan the creation of a Special Investigation Team (SIT) to investigate the suicide.

During the 10 March 2021 parliamentary Zero Hour session, Vinayak Raut declared: "MVA government in Maharashtra has deputed ATS (Anti-Terrorism Squad) to probe the matter but I request the PM through this House that the local Administration, SP and Collector should be sacked and tried under IPC Section 304 (culpable homicide not amounting to murder)."

On 10 March 2021, Supriya Sule and Nationalist Congress Party leader issued a memorandum signed by MPs from other parties including Shashi Tharoor of Indian National Congress, Akhilesh Yadav of Samajwadi Party and members of the Shiv Sena, Dravida Munnetra Kazhagam, Trinamool Congress and the Bahujan Samaj Party to urging LS Speaker Om Birla to refer the case to the Committee of Privileges.

=== Ongoing Street Protests ===
People joined a candlelight vigil marching through Zanda Chowk and Kilvani Naka in Silvassa on 26 February 2021. Local leaders present included Prabhubhai Tokiya and Daman Youth Action Committee, president Umesh Patel along with Delkar family. Placards demanded justice for Delkar and contended that his fate was 'institutional murder'. Street protests continued daily through Silvassa and around DNH. The FIR registration resulted in the protesters demanding removal of Praful Khoda Patel. Local politicians lead protesters with black flags on 12 March against local administration program resulting in its cancellation with officials leaving under police protection. On 14 March 2021 protesters burnt effigy of Patel. The Adivassi Vikash Sangathan (AVS) tribal rights organisation that Delkar founded has announced a bandh (strike) for Monday 22 March 2021.

Lok Sabha
Preceded by Sitaram Jivyabhai Gavli	Member of Parliament for Dadra and Nagar Haveli; 1989 – 2009	Succeeded by Natubhai Gomanbhai Patel
Preceded by Natubhai Gomanbhai Patel	Member of Parliament for Dadra and Nagar Haveli; 2019 – 2021	Succeeded by Kalaben Delkar
