= List of governors of Goa =

Heads of state of Goa

Governor of Goa
- Emblem of Goa

- Flag of India

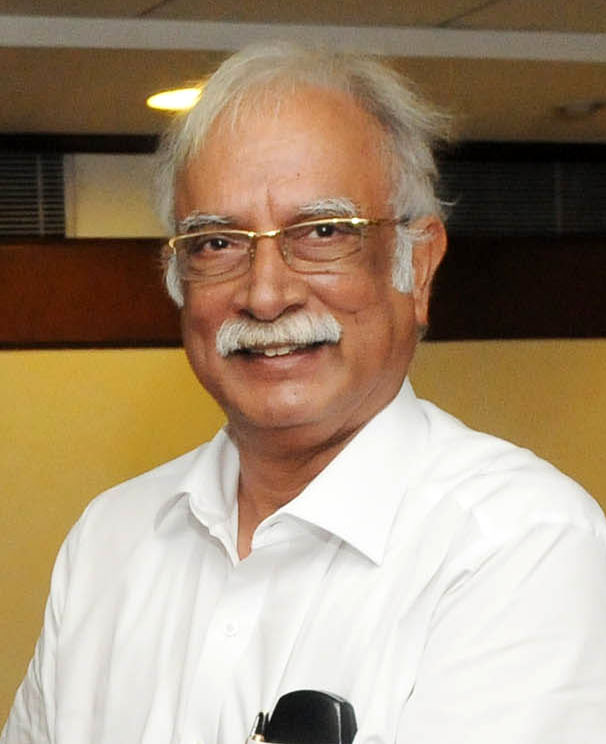
- Incumbent; Pusapati Ashok Gajapathi Raju since 26 July 2025
- Style: His Excellency
- Residence: Lok Bhavan, Panaji
- Appointer: President of India
- Term length: At the pleasure of the president
- Precursor: Lieutenant Governor of Goa, Daman and Diu
- Inaugural holder: Gopal Singh
- Formation: 30 May 1987; 39 years ago
- Website: www.rajbhavan.goa.gov.in

The governor of Goa is the nominal head of the Indian state of Goa. The governor is appointed by the president for a term of five years. Pusapati Ashok Gajapathi Raju became 21st governor on 26 July 2025.

== Powers and functions ==
The governor has:

- Executive powers related to administration, appointments and removals,
- Legislative powers related to lawmaking and the state legislature, that is Vidhan Sabha or Vidhan Parishad, and
- Discretionary powers to be carried out according to the discretion of the governor.

=== Ex officio powers ===
- The governor is the chancellor of Goa University and exercises powers delegated under the Goa University Act, 1984, and the statutes of the university.
- The governor is the ex officio president of the Indian Red Cross Society, Goa Branch, and has the powers to appoint the chairman, hon. secretary, etc.
- The governor is the president of the Goa State Environment Protection Council, which is an advisory body, set up by the government of Goa. The council consisting of government authorities and the NGOs engaged in environmental and the related areas meets once in six months and deliberates on various issues on the environment and ecology of the state.
- The governor is the chairman of the Special Fund for Rehabilitation and Reconstruction of Ex-Servicemen and Widows.

== Lieutenant governors of Goa, Daman and Diu ==
Goa, Daman and Diu was a union territory of India until 30 May 1987. As such it had a lieutenant governor till that time.

#	Portrait	Name (born – died)	Took office	Left office
1		Kunhiraman Palat Candeth (1916–2003)	19 December 1961	6 June 1962
2		Tumkur Sivasankar	7 June 1962	1 September 1963
3		M. R. Sachdev (1903–1964)	2 September 1963	8 December 1964
4		Hari Sharma (1910–1987)	12 December 1964	23 February 1965
5		K. R. Damle	24 February 1965	17 April 1967
6		Nakul Sen	18 April 1967	15 November 1972
7		S. K. Banerji	16 November 1972	15 November 1977
8		P. S. Gill	16 November 1977	30 March 1981
9		Jagmohan (1927–2021)	31 March 1981	29 August 1982
10		Idris Hasan Latif (1923–2018)	30 August 1982	23 February 1983
11		K. T. Satarawala (1916–2001)	24 February 1983	3 July 1984
(10)		Idris Hasan Latif (1923–2018)	4 July 1984	23 September 1984
13		Gopal Singh (1917–1990)	24 September 1984	29 May 1987

== Governors of Goa (1987–present) ==
Legend

- ^{†} Died in office
- ^{§} Transferred
- ^{‡} Resigned/removed

Color key

- indicates acting/additional charge

#	Portrait	Name (born – died)	Home state	Tenure in office			Appointer (President)
#	Portrait	Name (born – died)	Home state	From	To	Time in office	Appointer (President)
1		Gopal Singh (1917–1990)	Punjab	30 May 1987	17 July 1989^{[§]} (Note: Transferred as the Governor of Nagaland)	2 years, 48 days	Zail Singh
2		Khurshed Alam Khan (1919–2013)	Uttar Pradesh	18 July 1989	17 March 1991	1 year, 242 days	Ramaswamy Venkataraman
3		Bhanu Prakash Singh (1929–2019)	Madhya Pradesh	18 March 1991	3 April 1994^{[‡]}	3 years, 16 days	Ramaswamy Venkataraman
4		B. Rachaiah (1922–2000) (Additional charge)	Karnataka	4 April 1994	3 August 1994	121 days	Shankar Dayal Sharma
5		Gopala Ramanujam (1915–2001)	Tamil Nadu	4 August 1994	15 June 1995^{[§]} (Note: Transferred as the Governor of Orissa)	315 days	Shankar Dayal Sharma
6		Romesh Bhandari; IFS (Retd) (1928–2013)	Punjab	16 June 1995	18 July 1996^{[§]} (Note: Transferred as the Governor of Uttar Pradesh)	1 year, 32 days	Shankar Dayal Sharma
7		P. C. Alexander; IAS (Retd) (1921–2011) (Additional charge)	Kerala	19 July 1996	15 January 1998	1 year, 180 days	Shankar Dayal Sharma
8		T. R. Satishchandran; IAS (Retd) (1929–2009)	Karnataka	16 January 1998	18 April 1998^{[‡]}	92 days	K. R. Narayanan
9		Lieutenant General; J. F. R. Jacob PVSM (Retd.) (1921–2016)	West Bengal	19 April 1998	26 November 1999^{[§]} (Note: Transferred as the Governor of Punjab and Administrator of Chandigarh)	1 year, 221 days	K. R. Narayanan
10		Mohammed Fazal (1922–2014)	Uttar Pradesh	26 November 1999	25 October 2002^{[§]} (Note: Transferred as the Governor of Maharashtra)	2 years, 333 days	K. R. Narayanan
11		Kidar Nath Sahani (1926–2012)	National Capital Territory of Delhi	26 October 2002	2 July 2004^{[‡]}	1 year, 250 days	A. P. J. Abdul Kalam
12		Mohammed Fazal (1922–2014) (Additional charge)	Uttar Pradesh	3 July 2004	16 July 2004	13 days	A. P. J. Abdul Kalam
13		S. C. Jamir (born 1931)	Nagaland	17 July 2004	20 July 2008^{[§]}	4 years, 3 days	A. P. J. Abdul Kalam
14		Shivinder Singh Sidhu; IAS (Retd) (1929–2018)	Punjab	21 July 2008	7 September 2011	3 years, 48 days	Pratibha Patil
14		Kateekal Sankaranarayanan (1932–2022) (Additional charge)	Kerala	8 September 2011	3 May 2012	238 days	Pratibha Patil
15		Bharat Vir Wanchoo; IPS (Retd) (born 1951)	Madhya Pradesh	4 May 2012	11 July 2014^{[‡]}	2 years, 68 days	Pratibha Patil
15		Margaret Alva (born 1942) (Additional charge)	Karnataka	12 July 2014	5 August 2014	24 days	Pranab Mukherjee
16		Om Prakash Kohli (1935–2023) (Additional charge)	National Capital Territory of Delhi	6 August 2014	30 August 2014	24 days	Pranab Mukherjee
17		Mridula Sinha (1942–2020)	Bihar	31 August 2014	2 November 2019	5 years, 63 days	Pranab Mukherjee
18		Satya Pal Malik (1946–2025)	Uttar Pradesh	3 November 2019	18 August 2020^{[§]} (Note: Transferred as the Governor of Meghalaya)	289 days	Ram Nath Kovind
19		Bhagat Singh Koshyari (born 1942) (Additional charge)	Uttarakhand	18 August 2020	14 July 2021	322 days	Ram Nath Kovind
20		P. S. Sreedharan Pillai (born 1954)	Kerala	7 July 2021	25 July 2025	4 years, 18 days	Ram Nath Kovind
21		Pusapati Ashok Gajapathi Raju (born 1951)	Andhra Pradesh	26 July 2025	Incumbent	1 year, 79 days	Droupadi Murmu

== See also ==
- History of Goa
- Governors of India
