= Natubhai Gomanbhai Patel =

Indian politician

Member of Parliament, Lok Sabha
- In office 16 May 2009 – 23 May 2019
- Preceded by: Mohanbhai Sanjibhai Delkar
- Succeeded by: Mohanbhai Sanjibhai Delkar
- Constituency: Dadra and Nagar Haveli

Personal details
- Born: 4 May 1972 (age 54) Silvassa, India
- Party: Bharatiya Janata Party
- Spouse: Jayshreeben N.
- Children: 1 Son & 1 Daughter. Both studying in school.
- Profession: Builder

Natubhai Gomanbhai Patel (born 4 May 1972 in Silvassa) is an Indian politician, belonging to Bharatiya Janata Party. In the 2009 election he was elected to the 15th Lok Sabha from the Dadra and Nagar Haveli Lok Sabha constituency. He won again in 2014, but lost in 2019 elections.

He is a builder and married to SMT Jayashreeben and has one son and one daughter.
