= Kalaben Delkar =

Indian politician

Member of Lok Sabha
- Incumbent
- Assumed office 2 November 2021
- Preceded by: Mohanbhai Sanjibhai Delkar
- Constituency: Dadra and Nagar Haveli

Personal details
- Born: August 21, 1971 (age 54) Sukhala, Valsad, Gujarat
- Party: Bharatiya Janata Party (2024-present)
- Other political affiliations: Shiv Sena (Uddhav Balasaheb Thackeray) (2021-2024)
- Spouse: Mohanbhai Sanjibhai Delkar
- Education: B.A.
- Alma mater: Veer Narmad South Gujarat University
- Profession: Business & Social Work

Kalaben Mohanbhai Delkar (born 21 August 1971) is an Indian politician and a Member of Parliament from Dadra and Nagar Haveli parliamentary constituency in the Union Territory of Dadra and Nagar Haveli and Daman and Diu. She is a member of the Bharatiya Janata Party. She is the first woman Member of Parliament from Dadra and Nagar Haveli .

== Personal life ==
She was married to former seven time MP of DNH Mohanbhai Sanjibhai Delkar. They had a son and a daughter.

== Political career ==
She successfully contested the 2021 by-poll from Dadra and Nagar Haveli Lok Sabha seat as a member of Shiv Sena, after the death of her husband Mohanbhai Sanjibhai Delkar. She won against Mahesh Gavit of the Bharatiya Janata Party by 51270 votes.

In March 2024, Delkar was named as Bharatiya Janata Party candidate from Dadra and Nagar Haveli Lok Sabha constituency in the 2024 Indian general election and won the election by defeating Ajit Rambhai of congress by a margin of 57,584 votes.
