= Praful Khoda Patel =

Indian politician (born 1957)

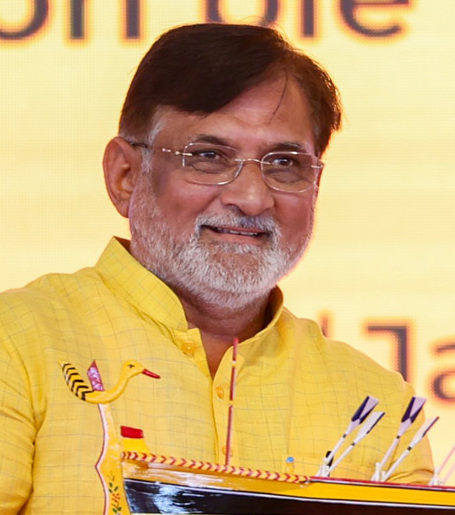
- Patel in January 2024

1st Administrator of Dadra and Nagar Haveli and Daman and Diu
- Incumbent
- Assumed office 26 January 2020
- President: Ram Nath Kovind; Droupadi Murmu
- Preceded by: Office established

35th Administrator of Lakshadweep
- Additional Charge
- Assumed office 5 December 2020
- Appointed by: Ram Nath Kovind
- Preceded by: Dineshwar Sharma

16th Administrator of Daman and Diu
- In office 29 August 2016 – 26 January 2020
- President: Pranab Mukherjee; Ram Nath Kovind
- Preceded by: Vikram Dev Dutt
- Succeeded by: Office abolished

29th Administrator of Dadra and Nagar Haveli
- In office 30 December 2016 – 26 January 2020
- President: Pranab Mukherjee; Ram Nath Kovind
- Preceded by: Madhup Vyas
- Succeeded by: Office abolished

Member of Gujarat Legislative Assembly
- In office 2007 – 2012
- Preceded by: Chavada Ranjitsinh Narsinh
- Succeeded by: Rajendrasinh Chavda
- Constituency: Himatnagar

Minister of State for Home Affairs in Gujarat
- In office 21 August 2010 – 17 December 2012
- Chief Minister: Narendra Modi

Personal details
- Born: 28 August 1957 (age 69) Unava, Gujarat, India
- Party: Bharatiya Janata Party
- Education: Civil engineering
- Occupation: Politician

Praful Khodabhai Patel (born 28 August 1957) is an Indian politician, who is the administrator of the union territories of Dadra and Nagar Haveli and Daman and Diu, and Lakshadweep.

== Political career ==
Patel began his political career winning the 2007 Gujarat Legislative Assembly election for the Himatnagar constituency in Gujarat for its 12th legislative assembly. Patel's father Khodabhai Ranchhodbhai Patel was a Rashtriya Swayamsevak Sangh (RSS) leader and Narendra Modi often visited him. From 21 August 2010 Patel served as MoS Home Minister of Gujarat under Chief Minister Narendra Modi. His ties with Modi helped his ministerial appointment, vacated by Amit Shah in jail for the Sohrabuddin Sheikh extrajudicial killing case. Prior to Amit Shah's arrest Narendra Modi inducted four ministers in cabinet reshuffle and Praful Patel received eight of Amit Shah's ten portfolios.

Praful Patel then lost the 2012 Gujarat Legislative Assembly election cutting short his political career in Gujarat.

After Narendra Modi became Prime Minister in 2014, Modi appointed Patel as the Administrator of Daman and Diu in 2016 followed shortly after by Administrator of Dadra and Nagar Haveli.

Praful Patel was one of the politically appointed administrators in the history of the union territories. Such positions have commonly been held by Indian Administrative Service officers.

On 26 January 2020, he became the inaugural Administrator of Dadra and Nagar Haveli and Daman and Diu of the newly formed union territory of Dadra and Nagar Haveli and Daman and Diu after the merger of Dadra and Nagar Haveli and Daman and Diu. Consequent to the passing of the Administrator of Lakshadweep, Dineshwar Sharma, Praful Patel assumed additional charge as Administrator of the Union Territory of Lakshadweep from 5 December 2020.

== Controversies ==
=== 2019 Election Officer coercion ===
On 10 April 2019 Election Commission of India issued a notice to Praful K Patel stating that his actions violated provisions under the Representation of the People Act, 1951. The commission reprimanded Patel for having issued a "coercive" request to Kannan Gopinathan, the collector for Dadra and Nagar Haveli, and withdraw any notices issued to Gopinathan or any other election officials "during the election period." Election Commission Officials state that Praful Patel called election officers to issue them direct instructions. Crucial interference from Patel came after Gopinath sent a notice to Mohanbhai Sanjibhai Delkar for actions that violated the model code. Praful Patel retaliated by issuing a notice to Gopinath which Election Commission Officials described as an act of political vengeance. Since then, Kannan Gopinathan has been replaced with Sandeep Kumar Singh as collector.

=== 2019 Daman indigenous land clearing protests ===
Valuable seafront land along the 700 metre stretch from Moti Daman Lighthouse to Jampore beach is claimed to be owned by adivasi fishing communities who have lived there for generations as well as by NRI Damanese predominantly living in Leicester, UK. In December 2018, local residents received official looking documents purportedly instructed by Praful Patel ordering the confiscation of their land and demolition of homes to make way for development. In January 2019 Praful Patel hosted a hastily arranged meeting with British MP Keith Vaz but managed to allay his fears about the case. However, by November the bulldozing went ahead and the Daman protests began.

On 3 November 2019, Daman Collector Rakesh Minhas issued a Section 144 order banning peaceful assembly of four or more persons, slogan-shouting and the use of loudspeakers across the entire district and ordered the conversion of two High Schools into 'temporary jails'. 70 protesters were held in these 'temporary jails' and another 8 arrests were made. Few of the adivasi fisherfolk were rehoused whilst most languished traumatised and homeless on the streets near the rubble of their razed homes.

=== 2021 suicide of Mohan Delkar ===
Tribal rights advocate and Lok Sabha MP Mohanbhai Sanjibhai Delkar hanged himself at Hotel Sea Green in Mumbai on 22 February 2021 leaving a 15-page suicide note. The note held politicians and administrative officials responsible for "injustice", "insult" and "bias" meted out to him and specifically named Patel.

On 5 July 2020, Delkar had posted a video on Twitter threatening to resign as Lok Sabha MP because the local administration was "hounding him". Then on 19 September in parliament he raised the issue of "misbehaviour" by local officials "as part of a conspiracy" claiming that on Liberation Day (2 August), he was "denied the right to address the people of the region as an MP".

First Information Report (FIR) under Section 306 (abetment of suicide), 389 (Putting person in fear of accusation of offence, in order to commit extortion) and 506 (criminal intimidation) and sections of Scheduled Caste and Scheduled Tribe (Prevention of Atrocities) Act, 1989 was filed against Patel, Daman Collector Sandeep Kumar Singh, former police superintendent Sharad Darade, and few politicians including BJP leader Fatehsinh V Chauhan; who has a history of land grabbing disputes. Delkar's son Abhinav has alleged that Patel threatened Delkar to pay ₹25 crore (US$2.6 million) or he would be implicated under PASA Act.

=== 2021 Lakshadweep policies ===
Following his appointment as the Administrator of Lakshadweep in December 2020, Patel's administration ended mandatory quarantine for those entering the territory, and allowed anyone with a negative RT-PCR test to travel to the islands. The territory had its first COVID-19 case on 18 January 2021, and total cases had reached 7300 by the end of May. Mohammed Faizal P. P., Member of Parliament for Lakshadweep, attributed the rise in cases to the loosening of travel restrictions; the administration said that the surge was instead caused by the emergence of a more virulent SARS-CoV-2 strain, resumption of economic activity, and an increase in cases in Kerala, which is the territory's main link to mainland India.

Patel has also suggested policy changes such as instructing port authorities to cut ties with Beypore port and Cochin Port in Kerala and divert all maritime exchanges to New Mangalore Port. All dairy farms on the islands, run by the Animal Husbandry Department, were ordered to be shut down, with the cattle to be auctioned off, and dairy products instead to be imported from Gujarat-based Amul. Patel's administration also lifted alcohol restrictions, and banned beef and removed meat from the school Midday Meal Scheme. Many locals accused the administration of implementing a Hindutva agenda. Patel's administration also demolished fishermen's coastal sheds, citing violations of the Coast Guard Act. The Administration has argued that these policies are still in pipeline and yet to be implemented.

Opposition political parties such as the Indian National Congress and Communist Party of India (Marxist) have came out in protest. Some local members of Bharatiya Janata Party in Lakshadweep also voiced their criticism against Patel's policies. Following the controversy, the All India Congress Committee submitted a request to the Lakshadweep administration seeking permission to visit the island, but their request was rejected citing the COVID-19 situation in the island.

=== 2023 proposed demolition of a Catholic chapel in Daman ===
In February 2023, the Catholic community in Daman, is trying to prevent the demolition of a more than 400 year old chapel, still an active place of worship, which the Provincial Administrator, Praful Patel, wants to turn into a football field.
