= Daman and Diu =

Former union territory in western India

- Union territory
- 1987–2020
- Seal

- Map of Daman and Diu
- Capital: Daman
- Area
- 112 km^{2} (43 sq mi)
- Population
- 242,911
- Government
- Administrator
  - 1987 (first): Gopal Singh
  - 2019 (last): Praful Khoda Patel
- History
  - Established: 30 May 1987
  - Formation of Dadra and Nagar Haveli and Daman and Diu: 26 January 2020
- Political subdivisions: 2 districts
Preceded by	Succeeded by
Goa, Daman and Diu	Dadra and Nagar Haveli and Daman and Diu

Daman and Diu (English: /dəˈmɑːn...'diːuː/; Hindi: [d̪əmən...d̪iːʋ]) was a union territory in northwestern India. With an area of 112 km^{2} (43 sq mi), it was the smallest administrative subdivision of India on the mainland. The territory comprised two districts, Daman and Diu Island, geographically separated by the Gulf of Khambat. The state of Gujarat and the Arabian Sea bordered the territory. A Portuguese colony since the 1500s, these territories were taken over by India with the Annexation of Goa in 1961. Daman and Diu were administered as part of the union territory of Goa, Daman and Diu between 1961 and 1987. After the Goa Opinion Poll, they became separate union territories. In 2019, a legislation was passed to merge the union territories of Daman and Diu with its neighbouring union territory, Dadra and Nagar Haveli, to form the new union territory of Dadra and Nagar Haveli and Daman and Diu with effect from 26 January 2020.

== History ==
For over 450 years, the coastal enclaves of Daman (Portuguese: Damão) and Diu on the Arabian Sea coast were part of Portuguese India, along with Goa and Dadra and Nagar Haveli. Goa, Daman and Diu were incorporated into the Republic of India on 19 December 1961, by a military conquest named Operation Vijay. Portugal did not recognise the Indian annexation of these territories until the Carnation Revolution of 1974. The territory has also been ruled by Kolis.

The territories of Goa, Daman and Diu were administered as a single union territory until 30 May 1987, when Goa was granted statehood, leaving Daman and Diu as separate union territories. Each enclave constituted one of the union territory's two districts. Daman and Diu are approximately 650 kilometres away from each other by road.

On 3 November 2019, Daman Collector Rakesh Minhas issued a Section 144 order banning peaceful assembly of four or more persons, slogan-shouting and the use of loudspeakers across the entire and ordered the conversion of Government High School, Bhimpore and the Government Sarvottam High School, Moti Daman into 'temporary jails'. This was in response to a land ownership dispute between the local indigenous fishing community and the local administration that had confiscated their land and bulldozed their homes. The ensuing 2019 Daman Indigenous Land Clearing Protests resulted with the detention of 70 protesters in the 'temporary jails' and another 8 arrests. Few of the adivasi fisherfolk were re-housed whilst most languished traumatised and homeless on the streets near the rubble of their razed homes.

In December 2019, the Parliament of India passed legislation to merge Daman and Diu with the nearby union territory of Dadra and Nagar Haveli to create a new union territory to be known as Dadra and Nagar Haveli and Daman and Diu.

== Demographics ==
Historical population
Year	Pop.	±%
1951	49,000	—
1961	37,000	−24.5%
1971	63,000	+70.3%
1981	79,000	+25.4%
1991	102,000	+29.1%
2001	158,000	+54.9%
Source: Census of India

Literacy rates in Daman and Diu
Male	91.5%
Female	79.5%
Total	87.1%

According to the 2011 census, Daman and Diu had a literacy rate of 87.1%, higher than the national average of 74.04%. Male and female literacy rates are 91.5 and 79.5 per cent respectively. The lowest female-to-male ratio in India (618 females per thousand males) was recorded in Daman and Diu. The Daman district, with a sex ratio of 533:1000 (F:M), is among the lowest of all the districts.

=== Religion ===
Religion in Daman and Diu
Hinduism	90.50%
Islam	7.92%
Christianity	1.16%
Others	0.41%

Hinduism was the most common religion in Daman and Diu. Muslims were also now the second-largest religious group in the territory, followed by the indigenous Christians. The Catholic Christians of Daman and Diu were pastorally served by the Metropolitan Roman Catholic Archdiocese of Goa and Daman, which has its see in Goa, the primatial see of India.

=== Languages ===
Languages of Daman and Diu (2011)
1. Gujarati (50.8%)
2. Hindi (36.3%)
3. Marathi (4.53%)
4. Bengali (2.15%)
5. Odia (1.82%)
6. Nepali (0.58%)
7. Malayalam (0.51%)
8. Assamese (0.49%)
9. Others (2.78%)

Gujarati was the mother tongue of most of the territory's population, as they belong to the Gujarati-speaking Damaniya sub-caste. Along with Gujarati, Hindi and English were also widely used. Daman and Diu were once part of a combined union territory along with Goa (a Konkani-speaking region) before Goa became a state in 1987.

The use of Portuguese, which was the territory's official language during the colonial period, was in decline and relegated to home use. It was also used as a liturgical language by the territory's Catholics. Standard Portuguese existed in a post-creole continuum while Daman and Diu Portuguese was spoken by about 10,000–12,000 people in Daman.

The languages taught in schools in Daman and Diu under the three-language formula were:

- First language: Gujarati
- Second language: Hindi
- Third language: English

== Administration ==
According to the Constitution of India, the administration of Daman and Diu was carried out by an Administrator, appointed by the President of India as an agent of the President, not a head of state/government or a governor. He was assisted by several other officers in carrying out his duty.

=== Districts ===
The union territory of Daman and Diu had two districts:

- Diu District, an area of 40 km^{2} (15 sq mi). The main settlement is the town of Diu.
- Daman District, an area of 72 km^{2} (28 sq mi). The main settlement is the city of Daman.

== See also ==
- Battle of Diu
- Damania
