= List of administrators of Daman and Diu =

The Union Territory of Daman and Diu had shared its administrator with Dadra and Nagar Haveli since its inception on 30 May 1987. The union territory of Daman and Diu was merged with the nearby territory of Dadra and Nagar Haveli to create the new union territory of Dadra and Nagar Haveli and Daman and Diu on 26 January 2020 and the office of Administrator of Daman and Diu was abolished on that date.

== Administrator ==
#	Name	Took office	Left office
1	Gopal Singh	30 May 1987	18 July 1989
2	Khurshed Alam Khan	18 July 1989	25 March 1991
3	Bhanu Prakash Singh	25 March 1991	16 March 1992
4	K.S. Baidwan	16 March 1992	28 March 1994
5	Ramesh Chandra	28 March 1994	15 July 1995
6	S.P. Aggarwal	15 July 1995	26 June 1998
7	Ramesh Negi (acting)	26 June 1998	23 February 1999
8	Sanat Kaul	23 February 1999	23 April 1999
9	Ramesh Negi (acting)	23 April 1999	19 July 1999
10	O.P. Kelkar	19 July 1999	2003
11	Arun Mathur	2003	2006
12	R.K. Verma	2006	2009
13	Shri Satya Gopal,	2009	2011
14	Shri. Narendra cham,	2011	2012
15	B. S. Bhalla	28 September 2012	18 August 2014
16	Ashish Kundra	18 August 2014	13 March 2016
17	Vikram Dev Dutt	14 March 2016	29 August 2016
18	Praful Khoda Patel	29 August 2016	26 January 2020

== See also ==
- Daman and Diu
- List of administrators of Dadra and Nagar Haveli and Daman and Diu
- List of administrators of Dadra and Nagar Haveli
- Governors in India

== Sources ==
- http://www.worldstatesmen.org/India_states.html
- Ramjayam Nadar, Silvassa, Office Seceratary, UT PRESS CLUB
