= Damania =

Damania is a surname. Notable people with the surname include:

- Anjali Damania (fl. 2011), Indian politician
- Blossom Damania (fl. 2000), American virologist
- Rustom Damania (died 2001), Indian academic
- Zubin Damania (born 1973), American physician, businessman & comedian
