= Kannan Gopinathan =

Former Indian Administrative Service officer and activist

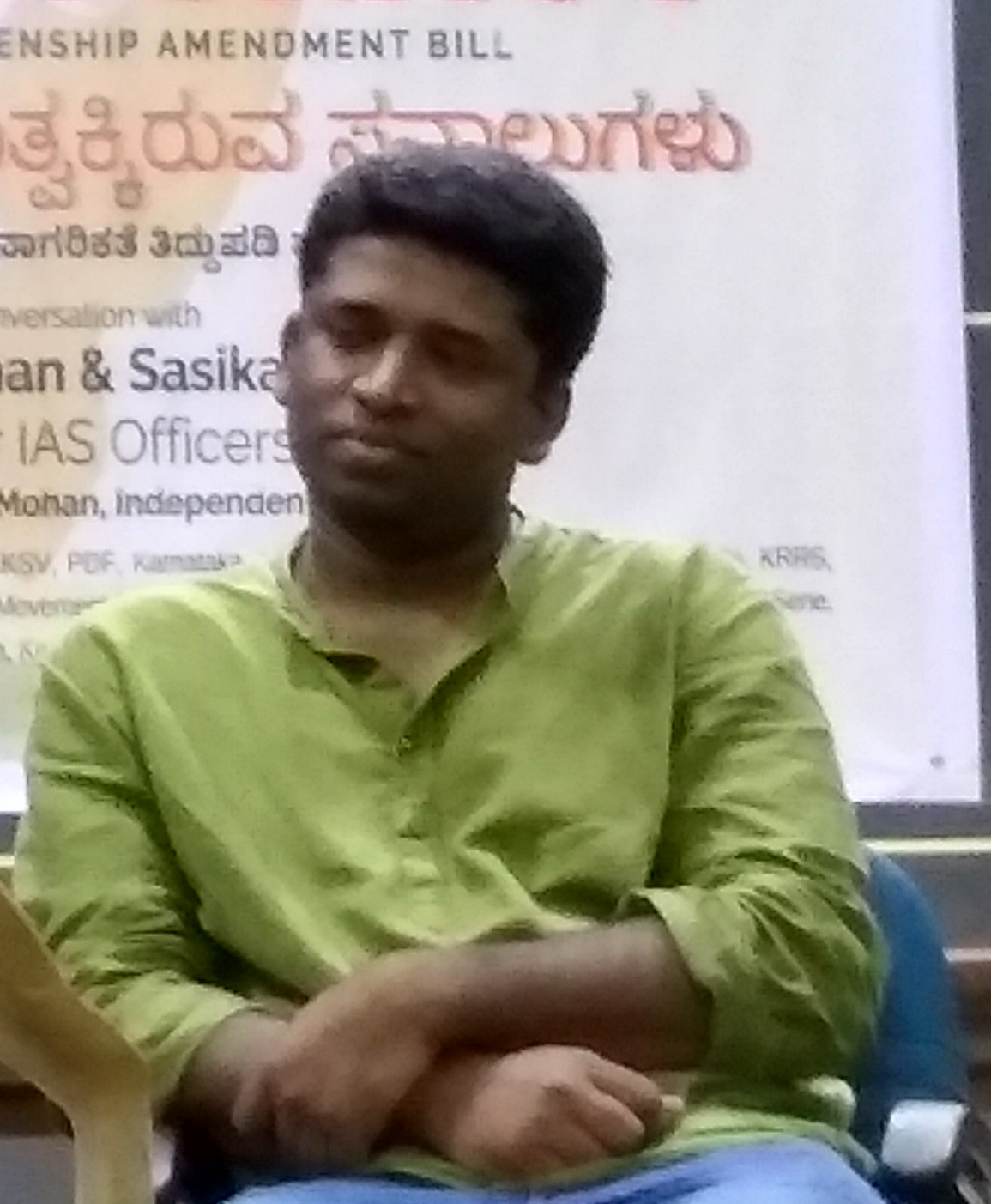
- Kannan Gopinathan in Bangalore, 2019
- Born: 12 December 1985 (age 40); Kottayam, Kerala
- Education: Birla Institute of Technology, Mesra
- Occupations: Social activist, Engineer, Politician
- Political party: Indian National Congress

Kannan Gopinathan (born 12 December 1985) is a former Indian Administrative Service officer and an activist from Kerala. He resigned from service as a mark of protest against the restrictions imposed in Jammu and Kashmir following the abrogation of article 370.

On 13 October 2025, Kannan Gopinathan joined the Political Party Indian National Congress in New Delhi.

== Personal life and family ==
Kannan Gopinathan was born in Kottayam District of Kerala, to K N Gopinathan Nair, an Upper Division Clerk with Government of Kerala, and V R Kumari. He did his early education in Palakkad district of Kerala before moving to Kottayam and was state level joint topper in the Kerala Technical High School Leaving Certificate Examination of 2001. Doing his engineering in Electrical and Electronics from Birla Institute of Technology, Mesra, Ranchi, Jharkhand, he was also the recipient of gold medal in the stream. He is married to Himani Pathak, a software engineer, who he met during his volunteering days in Noida.

== Career ==
Mr Gopinathan started his career with Freescale Semiconductor as a VLSI design engineer in Noida and worked for four years before resigning to prepare for the Indian Administrative Services. During the period he was actively involved in teaching kids in a slum as a volunteer with Association for India's Development Noida chapter.

Joining the Indian Administrative Service in 2012 in the AGMUT Cadre, the officer first came to limelight for his rather unusual letter to the then State Bank of India chairperson requesting an ATM in the remote subdivision of Hnahthial, in Mizoram. His initiatives in the Indian state of Mizoram included efforts to improve state run schools, and the drive to revive Chite Lui. He also initiated the setting up of badminton academy and grassroots training centres across the state in association with Tata Trusts and Pullela Gopichand. As District Magistrate of Aizawl, a highly disaster prone district, the comprehensive disaster management framework with Aizawl DDMA app and associated administrative ecosystem he developed won a citation in Government of India's 21st national conference on e-Governance. Project Himna - MADAT, an early intervention and awareness program against drugs usage among upper primary and high-school going students started in Aizawl District during Mr Gopinathan's tenure was later adopted and scaled up across Mizoram considering the high incidence of substance abuse in the state. The Northeast Today named him as one of the five bureaucrats who made a difference in the North East in 2017.

During the 2018 Kerala floods, news of his volunteering efforts in various camps without revealing his identity as an IAS officer surfaced and was widely reported. Then 32-year-old, the IAS officer, Kannan Gopinathan worked at relief camps in flood-hit Kerala for eight days until he was recognised by a senior.

Mr Kannan Gopinathan, as a secretary of key departments in Dadra and Nagar Haveli and Daman and Diu, was instrumental in transforming a loss-making government electricity distribution firm into a profit-making one and completion of two decade delayed ring road project in Silvassa.

His twitter thread while still holding the position of a District Magistrate on the difficulties faced by a young man due to an Aadhaar enrolment error became controversial as the Aadhaar case was being heard in the Supreme Court at the time.

== Activism ==
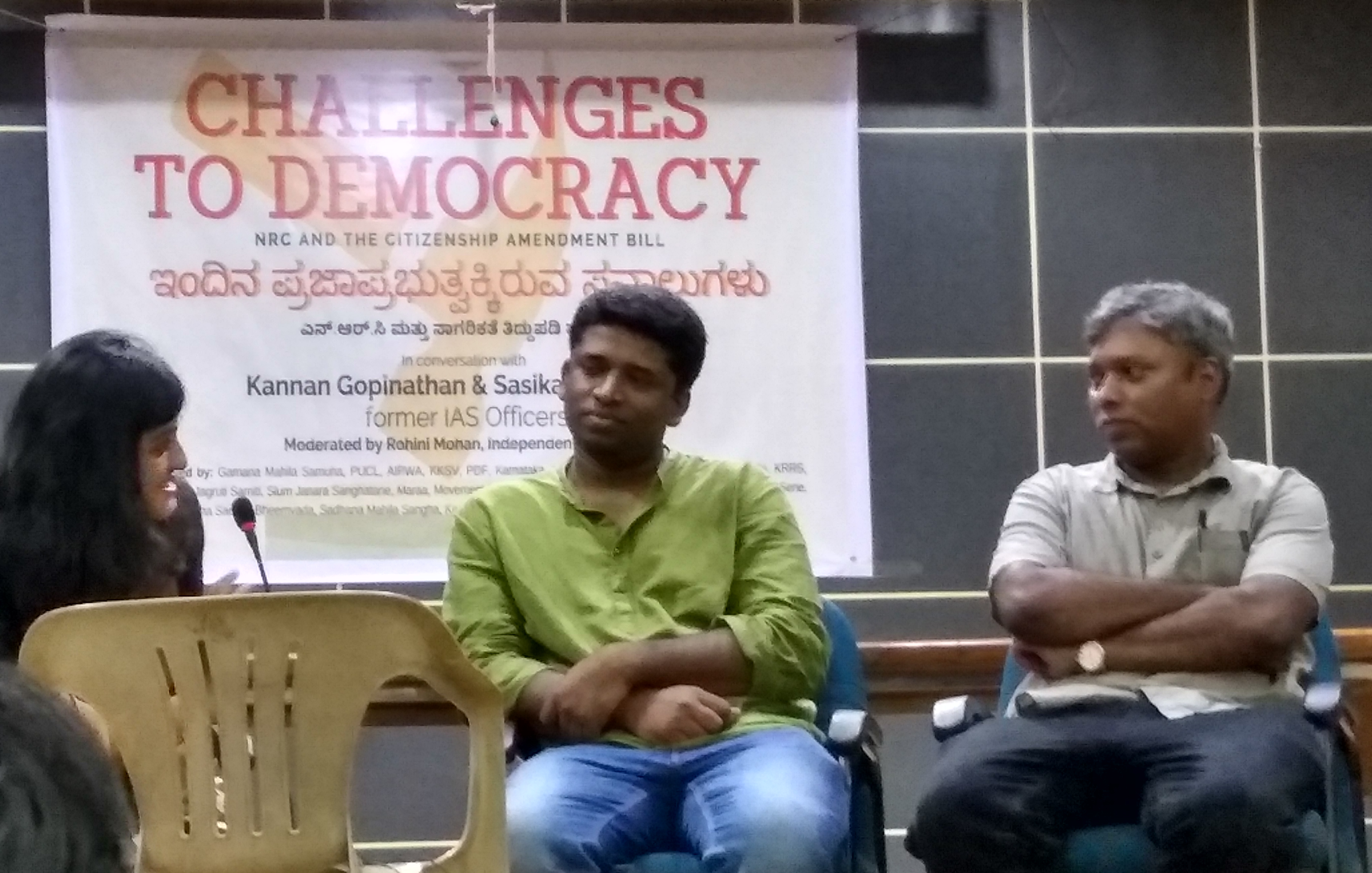
Kannan Gopinathan with Sasikanth Senthil and Rohini Mohan

After his resignation, he has been vocal on the importance of raising questions in a democracy, the threat of perceived victimhood among the majority and on the violation of fundamental rights in Jammu and Kashmir. A vociferous critic of the constitutionality and morality of Citizenship Amendment Act of 2019 and the proposed NRC, he became one of the leading figures in the Citizenship Amendment Act protests that erupted across India against the citizenship amendment act. He was detained at multiple places including Mumbai, Agra and Prayagraj, preventing him from taking part in protests and delivering talks.

Government asked Mr Gopinathan to report for duty again in April 2020, which he refused by saying that he is ready to volunteer for COVID-19 crisis, but will not be joining IAS again. Later, an FIR was registered against him under various sections of Disaster Management Act, 2005, Epidemic Diseases Act, 1897 and Indian Penal Code on the basis of Government complaint over his refusal to rejoin duty Government also initiated disciplinary proceedings against Mr Kannan Gopinathan for service rule violations including his interactions with media.
