= Bharatiya Navshakti Party =

- Founder: Mohanbhai Sanjibhai Delkar
- Merged into: Indian National Congress

Bharatiya Navshakti Party (Indian New Force Party), was a political party in India. BNP was active in the Union Territory of Dadra and Nagar Haveli and the Adivasi areas in southern and central Gujarat. BNP was led by the Lok Sabha MP from Dadra and Nagar Haveli, Delkar Mohanbhai Sanjibhai.

Before launching BNP, Delkar had been involved in the formation of the Indian Federal Democratic Party together with the infamous Pappu Yadav.

In 2000 BNP contested the panchayat elections in Dadra and Nagar Haveli together with the Indian National Congress. The BNP-Congress combine won 10 of 12 seats in the governing body and 2/3 of all village councils.

In the 2004 Lok Sabha elections Delkar won as the candidate in the Dadra and Nagar Haveli seat. The party provides outside support to the UPA government at the centre.

The party was merged with Indian National Congress before 2009 General Election.
