= Hari Sharma =

Indian civil servant

Member, Union Public Service Commission
- In office 22 May 1967 – 22 May 1973
- Chairman: K. R. Damle; Ranadhir Sarkar; Akhlaqur Kidwai

Secretary to Government of India (UT) in Ministry of Home Affairs
- In office 1965–1967

4th Lieutenant Governor of Goa, Daman and Diu
- In office 12 December 1964 – 23 February 1965
- Preceded by: M. R. Sachdev
- Succeeded by: K. R. Damle

Personal details
- Born: 1910
- Died: 1987 (aged 76–77)

Hari Sharma (1910–1987) was an Indian career civil servant who formerly served as Member of Union Public Service Commission and Secretary to Government of India (UT) in Ministry of Home Affairs during the terms of Home Ministers Gulzarilal Nanda, Indira Gandhi and Yashwantrao Chavan.

He was a member of Imperial Secretariat Service and later Central Secretariat Service officer.

== Early life and education ==
Hari Sharma was born in British India and had degrees in Master of Arts and Bachelor of Laws.

== Career ==
He joined the Imperial Secretariat Service during British rule in India and later merged into Central Secretariat Service. He served as Foreign and Political Minister in Patiala State from 1947–48 and was a member of Major States Negotiating Committee, 1947. He was later appointed adviser to Government of India's Delegation to United Nations Security Council in 1948.

He was appointed Joint Secretary to the Government of India in the Ministry of States from 1950-51 and later appointed Minister in Government of Rajasthan and then adviser and counsellor to Rajasthan Government, 1951–54.

He was later appointed Joint Secretary to the Government of India in Ministry of Home Affairs in 1955 and served in this post until 1959. He was later promoted as Additional Secretary to the Government of India (1959–63) and later served as Special Secretary (1964–65). He was later appointed Secretary to the Government of India (Union Territories) in Ministry of Home where he served from 1965 to 1967.

He also served as Lieutenant Governor of Goa, Daman and Diu and Member of Union Public Service Commission.

Government offices
Preceded by	Member of Union Public Service Commission; 22 May 1967 - 22 May 1973	Succeeded by
Political offices
Preceded by M. R. Sachdev	Lieutenant Governor of Goa, Daman and Diu; 12 December 1964 - 23 February 1965	Succeeded by K. R. Damle
Order of precedence
Unknown	Order of Precedence of India as Secretary to Government of India	Unknown
