= SSR College of Arts, Science and Commerce =

College in western India

SSR College of Arts, Commerce and Science
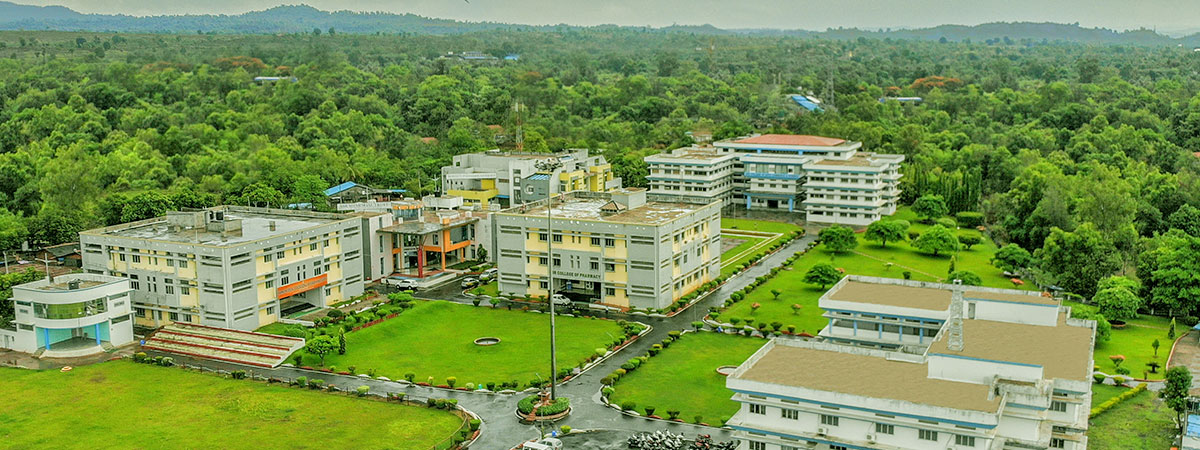
- Type: Private
- Established: 2006
- Academic affiliations: Savitribai Phule Pune University
- Principal: Rajeev Singh
- Location: Silvassa, Dadra and Nagar Haveli and Daman and Diu, India; 20.250°N 73.032°E
- Campus: Urban
- Website: ssracs.edu.in

SSR College of Arts, Commerce and Science, is a general degree college situated in Silvassa, Dadra and Nagar Haveli and Daman and Diu. It was established in the year 2006. The college is affiliated with Pune University.

The Name SSR is the abbreviation of 'Svargiya Sanjhibhai Rupjhibai'. Sanjhibhai Rupjhibhai Delkar was the former MP of Dadra and Nagar Haveli and father of Mohanbhai Sanjibhai Delkar, the founder SSR Memorial trust, under which this college runs. The local administration has attempted to demolish the SSR College accommodation buildings housing 300 students. SSR Memorial Trustee Abhinav Delkar, the son of Mohan Delkar, stated that "over 350 police personnel had turned up outside our college with bulldozers on June 27, 2020 to demolish the structure. They stopped only when my father managed to get a stay from the court". On 11 March 2021 a senior Marine Drive police officer told the Times of India, "Some people were allegedly trying to destabilise a college trust property of Delkar’s, and were demanding money from him and pressurising him to induct certain people as trustees".

== Departments ==
=== B.Sc. ===
- Physics
- Chemistry
- Mathematics
- Botany
- Zoology
- Microbiology
- Computer Science

=== M.Sc ===
Organic Chemistry

=== Arts ===
- English
- History
- Psychology
- Political Science

=== B.Com ===
Business Administration Cost Accounting Business Finance

=== BBA ===
Marketing Humen Resources finance

=== M Com ===
Business Administration

== Accreditation ==
The college is recognized by the University Grants Commission (UGC). The college is accredited by NAAC with B+ Grade
