= M. R. Sachdev =

Indian civil servant (1903–1964)

Mulk Raj Sachdev CIE OBE

Lieutenant-Governor of Goa, Daman and Diu
- In office 2 September 1963 – 8 December 1964
- Chief Minister: Dayanand Bandodkar
- Preceded by: T. Sivasankar
- Succeeded by: Hari Sharma

Personal details
- Born: 12 October 1903
- Died: 8 December 1964 (aged 61) Panjim, Goa, India
- Education: Government College, Lahore; University of the Punjab; Sidney Sussex College

Mulk Raj Sachdev CIE OBE (12 October 1903 – Goa, 8 December 1964) was an Indian civil servant and administrator who served as the Lieutenant-Governor of the Union Territory of Goa, Daman and Diu from 2 September 1963 until his death while in office.

== Life and career ==
Sachdev received his early education in Quetta. After university studies at Government College, Lahore and at the University of the Punjab, he took a B.A. from Sidney Sussex College, Cambridge and entered the Indian Civil Service (ICS) in October 1928. He began his service in the Punjab as an assistant commissioner, and was promoted to deputy commissioner (officiating) in April 1933, eventually rising to additional deputy secretary in the Home Department of the Government of the Punjab.

By the time of the Second World War, he was a deputy secretary in the Supply Department of the Government of India, and was appointed an Officer of the Order of the British Empire (OBE) in the 1942 Birthday Honours list. In October 1943, he was appointed deputy director-general for Disposals, returning to service in the Punjab in 1945 as an additional secretary and director-general of civil supplies and rationing. He was appointed a Companion of the Order of the Indian Empire (CIE) in the 1946 Birthday Honours list.

After India's independence, Sachdev served as Chief Secretary in the newly formed state of East Punjab (subsequently Punjab) from 1949 until 1953. In 1953, he was appointed Director-General of Supplies and Disposals for the federal government, and was appointed Secretary to the Government of India in the Ministry of Works, Housing and Supply the following year. He subsequently served as Secretary in the Ministry of Irrigation and Power, also holding the position of Chairman of the Damodar Valley Corporation for a time. Sachdev was appointed Lieutenant-Governor of Goa, Daman and Diu on 2 September 1963, but was in the post for barely over a year before his death in office on 8 December 1964.
