= Gopal Singh (politician) =

Indian writer and politician (b. 1989, d. 1990)

Governor of Nagaland
- In office 20 July 1989 – 3 May 1990
- Preceded by: K. V. Krishna Rao
- Succeeded by: M. M. Thomas

Governor of Goa
- In office 30 May 1987 – 17 July 1989
- Preceded by: position established
- Succeeded by: Khurshed Alam Khan

Lt. Governor of Goa, Daman and Diu
- In office 24 September 1984 – 29 May 1987
- Preceded by: I. H. Latif
- Succeeded by: position abolished

Member of Parliament, Rajya Sabha
- In office 1962-1968
- Constituency: Nominated

Personal details
- Born: 29 November 1917
- Died: 8 August 1990 (aged 72)
- Spouse: Shrimati Inderjeet Kaur

Gopal Singh (29 November 1917 – 8 August 1990) was an Indian Governor and politician. He was also a former head of the country's Minorities' Commission and a writer.

Singh was the Governor of Goa from May 1987, earlier the Lieutenant Governor of Goa and first Governor of Nagaland. Singh was nominated member of Rajya Sabha from 3 April 1962 to 2 April 1968.

A litterateur, he translated the Granth Sahib, the Sikh scriptures, into English. He also was English-Punjabi lexicographer and biographer of Guru Nanak and Guru Gobind Singh.
