= List of administrators of Dadra and Nagar Haveli and Daman and Diu =

Head of UT Dadra and Nagar Haveli and Daman and Diu

Administrator of the Dadra and Nagar Haveli and Daman and Diu
- Seal of the Dadra and Nagar Haveli and Daman and Diu

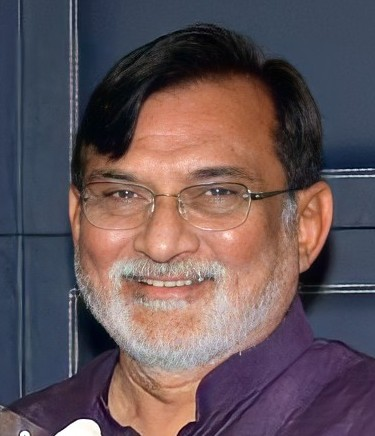
- Incumbent; Praful Khoda Patel since 26 January 2020
- Style: The Honourable
- Residence: Daman, India
- Appointer: President of India
- Term length: Five Years
- Inaugural holder: Praful Khoda Patel
- Formation: 26 January 2020 (6 years ago)

This is a list of administrators of Dadra and Nagar Haveli and Daman and Diu a union territory of India. The union territory of Dadra and Nagar Haveli and Daman and Diu was created following the merger of the union territories of Dadra and Nagar Haveli and Daman and Diu on 26 January 2020.

== Predecessor ==
=== List of administrators of Dadra and Nagar Haveli ===
Name	Took office	Left office
R. V. Mudras	22 July 1954	24 July 1954
Jayantibhai Desai	22 July 1954	1 August 1954
Vishwanath Lawande	2 August 1954	15 August 1954
Atmaram "Appasaheb" Narsinh Karmalkar	15 August 1954	May 1955
Antoni Furtado	May 1955	17 October 1960
Kishinchand Gobindram Badlani	17 October 1960	8 June 1962
Tumkur Sivasankar	8 June 1962	2 September 1963
M. R. Sachdev	2 September 1963	8 December 1964
Hari Sharma	12 December 1964	24 February 1965
Kashinath Raghunath Damle	24 February 1965	18 April 1967
Nakul Sen	18 April 1967	16 November 1972
S. K. Bandhopadhyay	16 November 1972	16 November 1977
Pratap Singh Gill	16 November 1977	31 March 1981
Jagmohan	31 March 1981	30 August 1982
Idris Hasan Latif (acting)	30 August 1982	24 February 1983
Kershasp Tehmurasp Satarawala	24 February 1983	4 July 1984
Idris Hasan Latif (acting)	4 July 1984	24 September 1984
Gopal Singh	24 September 1984	18 July 1989
Khurshed Alam Khan	18 July 1989	25 March 1991
Bhanu Prakash Singh	25 March 1991	16 March 1992
K. S. Baidwan	16 March 1992	28 March 1994
Ramesh Chandra	28 March 1994	15 July 1995
S. P. Aggarwal	15 July 1995	26 June 1998
Ramesh Negi (acting)	26 June 1998	23 February 1999
Sanat Kaul	23 February 1999	23 April 1999
Ramesh Negi (acting)	23 April 1999	19 July 1999
O. P. Kelkar	19 July 1999	2003
Arun Mathur	2003	2006
R. K. Verma	2006	2009
Satya Gopal, IAS	2009	2011
Narendra Kumar, IAS	2011	2012
B. S. Bhalla	28 August 2012	18 August 2014
Ashish Kundra	18 August 2014	13 March 2016
Vikram Dev Dutt	14 March 2016	3 October 2016
Madhup Vyas	4 October 2016	29 December 2016
Praful Khoda Patel	30 December 2016	26 January 2020

=== Lieutenant governors of Goa, Daman and Diu ===
Goa, Daman and Diu was a union territory of India until 30 May 1987. As such it had a lieutenant governor till that time.

#	Portrait	Name (born – died)	Took office	Left office
1		Kunhiraman Palat Candeth (1916–2003)	19 December 1961	6 June 1962
2		Tumkur Sivasankar	7 June 1962	1 September 1963
3		M. R. Sachdev (1903–1964)	2 September 1963	8 December 1964
4		Hari Sharma (1910–1987)	12 December 1964	23 February 1965
5		K. R. Damle	24 February 1965	17 April 1967
6		Nakul Sen	18 April 1967	15 November 1972
7		S. K. Banerji	16 November 1972	15 November 1977
8		P. S. Gill	16 November 1977	30 March 1981
9		Jagmohan (1927–2021)	31 March 1981	29 August 1982
10		Idris Hasan Latif (1923–2018)	30 August 1982	23 February 1983
11		K. T. Satarawala (1916–2001)	24 February 1983	3 July 1984
(10)		Idris Hasan Latif (1923–2018)	4 July 1984	23 September 1984
13		Gopal Singh (1917–1990)	24 September 1984	29 May 1987

=== List of administrators of Daman and Diu ===
#	Name	Took office	Left office
1	Gopal Singh	30 May 1987	18 July 1989
2	Khurshed Alam Khan	18 July 1989	25 March 1991
3	Bhanu Prakash Singh	25 March 1991	16 March 1992
4	K. S. Baidwan	16 March 1992	28 March 1994
5	Ramesh Chandra	28 March 1994	15 July 1995
6	S. P. Aggarwal	15 July 1995	26 June 1998
-	Ramesh Negi (acting)	26 June 1998	23 February 1999
7	Sanat Kaul	23 February 1999	23 April 1999
-	Ramesh Negi (acting)	23 April 1999	19 July 1999
8	O. P. Kelkar	19 July 1999	2003
9	Arun Mathur	2003	2006
10	R. K. Verma	2006	2009
11	Satya Gopal, IAS	2009	2011
12	Narendra Kumar, IAS	2011	2012
13	B. S. Bhalla	28 September 2012	18 August 2014
14	Ashish Kundra	18 August 2014	13 March 2016
15	Vikram Dev Dutt	14 March 2016	29 August 2016
16	Praful Khoda Patel	29 August 2016	26 January 2020

== Administrators of Dadra and Nagar Haveli and Daman and Diu (2020-present) ==
#	Portrait	Administrator (lifespan)	Took office	Left office	Term length	Appointed By
1		Praful Khoda Patel (born 1957)	26 January 2020	Incumbent	6 years, 258 days	Ram Nath Kovind

== Oath ==
“I, A. B., do swear in the name of God/solemly affirm that I will faithfully execute the office of Administrator (or discharge the functions of the Administrator) of .............(name of the Union Territory) and will to the best of my ability preserve, protect and defend the Constitution and the law and that I will devote myself to the service and well-being of the people of ..………(name of the Union Territory).”

== See also ==
- Dadra and Nagar Haveli and Daman and Diu
- List of administrators of Dadra and Nagar Haveli
- List of administrators of Daman and Diu
- Governors in India

== Sources ==
- http://www.worldstatesmen.org/India_states.html
