= Kershasp Tehmurasp Satarawala =

Indian diplomat (1916–2001)

- Born: 15 February 1916; Satara, Maharashtra, India
- Died: 20 August 2001 (aged 85); Pune, Maharashtra, India
- Occupations: Civil servant & Diplomat
- Years active: 1947–2001
- Spouse: Frainy Kaikhushru Bilimoria
- Children: Three daughters: Phiroza, Anahita, Ferida
- Parent(s): Tehmurasp Pirosha Satarawala, Meherbai Chiber
- Awards: Padma Bhushan, Burma Star

Kershasp Tehmurasp Satarawala (1916–2001) was an Indian civil servant belonging to the Indian Administrative Service, who served as: Lt. Governor of Goa, Daman & Diu & Dadra & Nagar Havelli (1983-1984), Governor of Punjab (1984-1985), Ambassador of India to Mexico, Guatemala & El Salvador (1985-1988). He was a recipient of the honor of Burma Star. The Government of India awarded him the third highest civilian honour of the Padma Bhushan, in 1983, for his contributions to society.

== Biography ==
Born on 15 February 1916 in Satara, in the western Indian state of Maharashtra to Tehmurasp Pirosha Satarawala and Meherbai Chiber, Satarawala graduated from Nowrosjee Wadia College, Pune (1937). He obtained his post graduation degrees from Government College, Lahore, and Command and Staff College, Quetta. He served as a Major in the Indian Army, before joining the Indian Administrative Service in 1947. His various posts included: Collector Dangs District (1949-1952), Chief Controller Imports & Exports (1958-1963), Secretary Gujarat, Industry, Mines & Power (1963-1967), Managing Director and Chairman Indian Airlines (1967- 1971), Secretary To GOI, Ministry of Steel & Mines (1973). He was sent on deputation as Advisor to the Governors of Gujarat (1971–72, 1974-75 & 1980); Orissa (1973–74) Jammu & Kashmir (1977).

Satarawala was appointed Vice Chairman and Co-ordinator of the IX Asian Games (1982), Lt. Governor of Goa, Daman & Diu & Dadra & Nagar Havelli (1983-1984), Governor of Punjab (1984-1985), Ambassador of India to Mexico, Guatemala & El Salvador (1985-1988).

Recipient of the Padma Bhushan (1983), Fellow Nuffield Foundation (1963), Burma Star Medal.

Director on the Boards of- Tata Chemicals, Gujarat State Fertilizers and Chemicals, Indian Oil Corporation, Air India, ITDC, and Hindustan Aeronautics Limited and chaired the board of Gujarat Aromatics Limited. Member- Minorities Commission (1981-1983), Indian Wildlife Board (1980-1983), World Wildlife Fund, W region (1976-1981). Vice President Bombay Natural History Society (1980), Founder member of Indian National Trust for Art & Cultural Heritage.

== Personal life and death ==
He was married to Frainy Kaikhushru Bilimoria. They had three daughters named Phiroza, Anahita and Ferida.

He died on 20 August 2001 in Pune at the age of 85.

== See also ==
- List of Ravians
- List of governors of Punjab (India)
