= Shashikala Hodarkar =

Indian independence activist (1931–2024)

Shashikala Hodarkar e Almeida
- Born: Shashikala Mangesh Hodarkar; 23 June 1931; Ponda taluka, Portuguese Goa
- Died: 2 September 2024 (aged 93); Pune, Maharashtra, India
- Education: Bachelor of Arts
- Movement: Goan independence movement
- Spouse: Anastacio Almeida

Shashikala Mangesh Hodarkar e Almeida (née Hodarkar; 23 June 1931 – 2 September 2024) was an Indian independence activist. She was a member of the National Congress (Goa) and is known for her participation in the Satyagraha movement against Portuguese colonial rule in 1955.

== Early life ==
Shashikala Mangesh Hodarkar was born on 23 June 1931 in Ponda taluka, Portuguese Goa. She completed her education up till a B. A. degree.

== Independence movement ==
Hodarkar's involvement in the independence movement was influenced by her older brother, Ramesh Bhai Hodarkar, who was a jailed activist, and the freedom fighter Sindhu Deshpande. Deshpande, who had arrived in Goa from Ahmednagar, stayed at the Hodarkar residence and encouraged the young Shashikala to join the movement.

Although Hodarkar intended to join a Satyagraha scheduled for 25 November 1954 at Azad Maidan in Panaji, she was initially prevented from doing so by her mother. She subsequently joined the National Congress Goa to further her involvement in the struggle. She was in contact with Peter Alvares and was detained for possession of "subversive literature".

On 17 February 1954, Pundalik Gaitonde was arrested for a verbal protest during a function. To commemorate this, in 17 February 1955, Hodarkar participated in a Satyagraha in Margao. Alongside Vilasini Prabhu (later Mahale), she distributed leaflets featuring the slogan "Quit Goa" written in Portuguese. During the protest, the two women raised the Indian flag and shouted the nationalist slogan "Jai Hind". Following this action, Hodarkar was arrested by the Margao police.

== Imprisonment ==
Following her arrest in 1955, Hodarkar was sentenced to prison and remained jailed until 1958. During her trial, records of which are maintained in the Goa State Archives, she noted that she was not subjected to physical assault while in custody. Further, her political rights were suspended for 15 years.

== Personal life ==
Hodarkar later married Anastacio Almeida, who was also an independence activist. In her later years, she resided in Margao near the Ana Fonte spring.

== Accolades ==
Hodarkar was honoured by the Government of Goa, Daman and Diu on 18 June 1986.

Her life story was documented in the Aguada Fort's interactive Museum in the 2020s. A book documenting her trial by the Portuguese was also released by the Goa government in 2024.

Hodarkar was honoured by Indian National Congress leader Priyanka Gandhi during "Priyadarshani Women’s Conference" in Margao in 2022.

== Death ==
Hodarkar died on 2 September 2024 in Pune. She was cremated on the same evening at the Vaikunth Smashan Bhumi.
