= Vishwanath Lawande =

Indian independence activist and lawyer (1923–1998)

- Portrait of Vishwanath Lawande

3rd Administrator of Dadra and Nagar Haveli
- In office 2 August 1954 – 15 August 1954
- Preceded by: Jayantibhai Desai
- Succeeded by: Atmaram "Appasaheb" Narsinh Karmalkar

Personal details
- Born: Vishwanath Narayan Lawande; 20 April 1923 Goa Velha, Portuguese Goa
- Died: 15 September 1998 (aged 75) Goa Medical College, Bambolim, Goa, India
- Party: Maharashtrawadi Gomantak Party
- Other political affiliations: Azad Gomantak Dal; Rashtra Seva Dal
- Spouse: Pramila Lawande
- Children: 1
- Occupation: Lawyer
- Known for: Indian annexation of Dadra and Nagar Haveli

Vishwanath Lawande (20 April 1923 – 15 September 1998) was an Indian independence activist and lawyer. He was a founder member of the Azad Gomantak Dal and played an important role in the Indian annexation of Dadra and Nagar Haveli. He was fondly referred to as Kaka.

== Early life ==
Vishwanath Narayan Lawande was born on 20 April 1923 at Goa Velha, to Narayan Pandurang Lawande. He had completed his BSc and LLB degrees. He pursued his BSc in Kolhapur. While here, he interacted with Achyut Patwardhan and Mohan Ranade. He also met Ram Manohar Lohia, who greatly influenced him. In 1946, he joined the Banaras Hindu University to pursue chemical engineering. However, he left to participate in the Goan independence movement.

== Role in independence movement ==
While studying at Kolhapur, Lawande was part of the Kolhapur Students' Union and was detained in police custody for 20 days for participating in the Quit India Movement. He organised the Rashtra Seva Dal in Kolhapur and even led it as its head for a few months. After the colleges were closed, he returned to Goa and organised the Seva Dal in Margao in November 1942. He and Narayan Palekar then formed a small group in Goa Velha that sang patriotic songs and powadas.

On 18 June 1946, now celebrated as Goa Revolution Day, he was one of many arrested and detained in Nova Goa police station for eight days. Later that year, on 18 November, he was arrested along with Narayan Palekar for organising a propaganda meeting at Maine, Goa Velha. He was then detained at Panaji for 45 days, after which he was clean shaven and freed. Later, on 18 December, he was beaten badly while offering satyagraha at Aldona, along with Suryakant Naik. They were both detained at Mapusa for 3 months, beaten badly for a week and then had their heads shaven clean, after which they were released on 23 April 1947.

Lawande was an active member of the National Congress (Goa). However, he had ideological differences with its peaceful methods and then founded and led the Azad Gomantak Dal (AGD), with the intention of fighting for Goa's independence movement through terrorist activities.

In July 1947, accompanied by other AGD members Dattatraya Deshpande and Prabhakar Sinari, Lawande attempted to arson the Fazenda (Treasury) at Mapusa. On 1 December 1947, he along with a few others attacked the Bank Manager, intercepting his bus on the route between Mapusa and Panjim and stole ₹6,000 (equivalent to ₹820,000 or US$8,700 in 2026) from him. While his associates were arrested, he went underground. He was tried in absentia in May 1929 and sentenced to 28 years of deportation, coupled with one year of imprisonment, failing which a fine of 10 Escudos per day would be imposed on him.

In 1950, he was elected as the General Secretary of the National Congress (Goa). He then attempted to organise it between 1951 and 1954 in Bombay, Aronda, Banda and Belgaum, publishing and secretly sending nationalist literature to Goa. He then set up a centre-cum-camp of the AGD at Vazrem, training volunteers present there in guerilla tactics.

On 29 July 1954, Lawande and 25 armed associates of his from the AGD marched towards Silvassa. On 1 August, with the help of reinforcements of 100 volunteers arriving from Poona and Bombay, they captured Silvassa. Within the next 10 days, they annexed the entirety of Nagar Haveli. He remained back there as Commando Administrator till 15 August 1954.

In June 1957, Lawande was part of a delegation of 11 Goans chosen for consultation by then Prime Minister of India, Jawaharlal Nehru. Others included Armando Menezes and his brother Nicolau Menezes, along with Luis Gracias, J. N. Heredia, Evágrio Jorge, Gerald Pereira, Rama Hegde, Pundalik Gaitonde, Peter Alvares and Purushottam Kakodkar.

In December 1960, Lawande was part of a delegation that met with then Home Minister of India Pandit Pant in New Delhi, urging the Indian government to take action for the Goa's independence. Others in the delegation were Eclito D’Souza, Irene Heredia, George Vaz, Lambert Mascarenhas, Aruna Asaf Ali and Bertha Braganza.

Between 1954 and 1961, he enrolled 400 AGD workers. Together, they conducted armed raids at Ravan military centre and at police stations in Honda, Keri, Chandel, Aldona, Betim, Kodal and Hankhon. They bombed mines at Pirla, Shirgaon, Sonshi and Pali, along with the Calem bridge and Caranzol railway station. They also ambushed patrol jeeps, resulting in a situation of terror. Lawande set up 13 centres of the AGD along the border of Portuguese Goa, along with a clandestine radio centre, the Azad Goa Radio. Till the Indian annexation of Goa, he organised meetings and protest marches in Belgaum and Bombay.

== Post-annexation of Goa ==
After the Indian annexation of Goa, Lawande contested elections in the 1963 Goa, Daman and Diu Legislative Assembly election from the St. Andre Assembly constituency, representing the Maharashtrawadi Gomantak Party (MGP) as its chief ministerial candidate. He was defeated by Teotonio Pereira.

Lawande then contested elections from the South Goa Lok Sabha constituency as an independent candidate in the 1967 elections to the Lok Sabha but did not win.

Lawande later practiced law and organised protests of drivers, workers, farmers and teachers. He was a member of the first Consultative Committee of the Lieutenant Governor of Goa, Daman and Diu. He founded the Navjivan Society of Freedom Fighters and advocated for the independence activists memorials at Patradevi and Azad Maidan, Panaji. In the late 1990s, he launched a protest across Goa against the government's decision to celebrate the 400th year of the arrival of Vasco da Gama to India, which led to the celebration being cancelled.

Lawande wrote books in Marathi, Mayem-Swatantrya Ladhyachya Aghadivarit Gaon and Vyartha Na He Balidan. He also wrote his memoirs, Na Ghetle te Vrat Andhatene, a phrase taken from a poem by Vinayak Damodar Savarkar.

== Personal life ==
Lawande had a daughter. He was married to Pramila Lawande, also an independence activist, who died in 2015.

== Death ==
Lawande died on 15 September 1998 of malarial fever at the Goa Medical College.

== Awards and accolades ==
In 1962, Lawande was awarded a scroll of honour by the administration of Dadra and Nagar Haveli. He was later awarded the Tamrapatra by the Government of India but he refused it.

== Works ==
- Mayem-Swatantrya Ladhyachya Aghadivarit Gaon
- Vyartha Na He Balidan
- Na Ghetle te Vrat Andhatene (autobiography)

== See also ==
- Mohan Ranade
- Prabhakar Sinari
