= Irene Heredia =

Indian author (1917–2013)

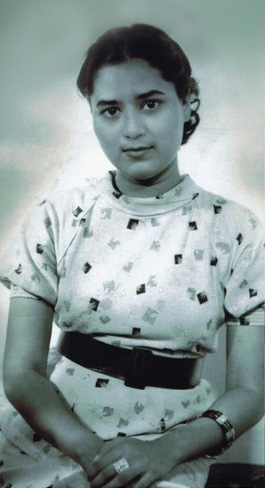
- Irene Heredia in her youth
- Born: 1917
- Died: 21 January 2013 (aged 95–96)
- Resting place: St. Peter Haines Road Cemetery
- Spouse: J. N. Heredia
- Children: 5
- Writing career
- Notable work: It's Been a Long Day - A Nonagenarian Remembers
- Literary movement: Goa liberation movement

Irene Heredia (1917 – 21 January 2013) was an Indian author, educator, and social advocate.

== Early life ==
Irene Heredia was born in 1917 in Goa. Following her father’s death when she was young, moved with her widowed mother and five siblings to Poona. There she learned Marathi from a European governess and experienced diverse schooling: first at a Protestant institution, then at an English‑style finishing school in Bombay. She excelled in her studies, topping the Bombay Presidency in her Bachelor’s degree and earning the Duke of Edinburgh scholarship.

== Career and public service ==
From 1958 to 1964, Heredia served as a member of the Central Film Censor Board, contributing to national cultural policy. Later, she dedicated herself to social work, joining three non‑governmental organisations and founding the Civic Group (later the Social Advocacy Group) to address public grievances and promote community welfare.

== Goa liberation movement ==
Irene and her husband were active members of the Goa Liberation Council in Bombay, working towards Goa's freedom. She also contributed to Free Goa magazine along with Bertha Braganza.

In December 1960, Heredia was part of a delegation that met with then Home Minister of India Pandit Pant in New Delhi, urging the Indian government to take action for the freedom of Goa. Others in the delegation were Eclito D’Souza, George Vaz, Vishwanath Lawande, Lambert Mascarenhas, Aruna Asaf Ali and Bertha Braganza.

== Memoir ==
Heredia’s memoir, It's Been a Long Day - A Nonagenarian Remembers, was first published in 2012 and updated in 2015. Her life story is narrated along with major historical events. She recounts life under British rule, the impact of World War II on Indian society, the Quit India Movement, India’s independence celebrations on 15 August 1947, and the Goa Liberation Day on 19 December 1961. The second edition includes an appendix of her speeches and writings, highlighting her role as a community leader and mentor.

Her memoir thus highlights the experiences of Goan women and the socio‑political transformations of mid‑20th‑century India, inspiring readers to appreciate the contributions of “unknown housewives” and community advocates.

== Personal life ==
Irene married J. N. Heredia, then honorary Consul for Brazil and son of a prominent Goan physician. Together, they had 5 children, Kit, Rudi (S.J.), Chantal, Delia, Selena.

== Death ==
Irene Heredia died in her sleep on 21 January 2013. The funeral was held on 23 January at the St. Michael's Church, Taleigao. Her ashes were then interred at the St. Peter's Haines Road Cemetery on 28 January.
