= Edila Gaitonde =

Portuguese musician and writer (1920–2021)

- Portrait of Edila Gaitonde
- Born: Edila Brum Dutra de Andrade; 3 November 1920; Faial Island, Azores, Portugal
- Died: 27 July 2021 (aged 100)
- Other name: Edila Nava
- Occupations: Musician, writer
- Spouses: Pundalik Gaitonde (m. 1948; death 1992) António Nava (m. 2010; death 2017)

Edila Nava or Edila Gaitonde (born Edila Brum Dutra de Andrade; 3 November 1920 – 27 July 2021) was a Portuguese musician and writer.

== Life and career ==
=== Early life ===
Edila Brum Dutra de Andrade was born on 3 November 1920 to Júlio Dutra Andrade and Adelaide Albertina Brum, on the Faial Island in the Azores islands just off the coast of Portugal. Júlio was a poet, playwright, journalist and sportsman who had published several books of his own.

Edila's parents were amateur musicians and encouraged her to study music further. She thus joined the Lisbon Music Conservatory to study music and pursue it as a career. By 1943, the family had moved to Lisbon for the same. Back then, it was rare for an Azorean woman to move to Lisbon.

=== First marriage ===
Edila was originally in a romantic relationship with a Portuguese man named António Nava, also from Faial island, since she was a teenager. In 1947, Edila, while busy with her studies, fell ill for a long period of time, caused by her exhaustion. Her cousin then invited Pundalik Gaitonde, a wealthy Hindu Brahmin doctor, to visit her. Gaitonde diagnosed her with double pleurisy. Her recovery took a year, during which she began a relationship with Gaitonde.

Pundalik and Edila decided to marry, but faced stiff opposition from their respective families. However, Pundalik's father later relented and granted permission. Pundalik and Edila married in a civil ceremony in 1948, making her the first White Portuguese woman to marry a Goan Hindu man. They spent their honeymoon at Peniche. The couple had no children.

Gaitonde selected Peniche as the honeymoon destination because it was the location of the prison-fort where several activists of the Goan independence movement such as Tristão de Bragança Cunha, Purushottam Kakodkar, Rama Hegde, José Inácio Candido de Loyola and Laxmikant Bhembre were imprisoned. These prisoners organised a celebration in honour of Pundalik and Edila, and hosted a meal for the newlyweds. A woman journalist from France was on a visit to the prison in order to meet Tristão de Bragança Cunha. When she questioned Pundalik Gaitonde about why he had selected Peniche as the destination for the honeymoon, Dr. Gaitonde replied, "Homage to sacrifice!"

=== Life after first marriage ===
They soon moved to Goa, with Edila moving in with Gaitonde's Hindu family. Gaitonde then began his medical practice there, while continuing his nationalist activities as part of the National Congress (Goa). Against the family's advice, Edila started a music school with the intention of the Western classical music education in Goa. In 1952, she trained 30 candidates for the examinations of the Royal School of Music in London. The school sent an examiner to Goa only for this.

When Gaitonde was arrested and deported to Portugal in 1954, Edila travelled with him. He was initially detained in the Aljube prison in Lisbon and later placed under house arrest in Porto. Later in 1955, they moved to India, living in Mumbai and subsequently in Delhi.

Following his defeat in the 1963 Lok Sabha elections, Gaitonde left Goa permanently for London with Edila. He then worked in a hospital there till he retired and began writing. Meanwhile, Edila taught music in various high schools and they both published multiple books. Gaitonde died in London in 1992.

=== Writing career ===
Edila authored multiple books during her stay in London. Her first book, In Search of Tomorrow, covers her life in India after her marriage. Her second book, The Tulsi, is a collection of short stories, including about the life of a Portuguese woman and her experiences in a Goan Hindu household. Her last book, Edmund the Mariner, covers the Spanish rule in Portugal, drawing a parallel to the Portuguese rule in Goa. She also wrote As Maçãs Azuis: Portugal e Goa 1948–1961 (transl. The Blue Apples: Portugal and Goa 1948-1961), describing to her mother.

=== Second marriage ===
During a visit to her native Faial, she reunited with her first boyfriend António Nava, now a widower and the father of the poet Luís Miguel Nava. Nava and Edila got married in 2010, and lived in Leça de Palmeira, in Porto, until his death in 2017.

=== Death ===
Edila died on 27 July 2021 at the age of 100.

== Works ==
- In Search of Tomorrow
- The Tulsi
- As Maçãs Azuis: Portugal e Goa 1948–1961 (transl. The Blue Apples: Portugal and Goa 1948-1961)
- Edmund the Mariner
