= Rama Hegde =

Indian independence activist and physician

- Portrait of Rama Hegde
- Born: Rama Krishna Hegde; 29 April 1912
- Died: Unknown
- Occupation: Doctor
- Movement: Goan independence movement
- Spouse: Maria Amelia

Rama Krishna Hegde (29 April 1912 - ?) was an Indian independence activist and physician.

== Life ==
=== Early life ===
Rama Krishna Hegde was born on 29 April 1912 in Madgaon to Krishna Rama Hegde. He studied medicine at the Escola Médico-Cirúrgica de Goa. During his youth, he was active in socio-political activities and wore a Gandhi cap.

=== Goan independence movement ===
He protested against the kidnapping of a girl from Cuncolim with the intention of forcefully baptizing her. He was one of the main organisers of the Sanghatna Samiti, later the Gomantak Congress. He participated in the civil disobedience movement from 19 June 1946, after the events of Goa Revolution Day.

At the first conclave of the National Congress (Goa) (NCG), held at Londa on 17 and 18 August 1946, Hegde was elected as its first president. He then offered satyagraha on 18 October 1946 at Madgaon. While addressing the audience in Marathi, he was arrested for instigating the public against the foreign domination, and for the distribution of pamphlets that featured an appeal signed by him as the president of the NCG. He was initially imprisoned at the Aguada fort jail and then sentenced to 8 years' deportation. Along with José Inácio Candido de Loyola, Laxmikant Bhembre and Purushottam Kakodkar, he was deported to Portugal in a ship, Bartolomeu Dias. They reached Portugal on 5 January 1947 and was initially detained at the Limoeiras and the Caxias jails, before being detained at Peniche.

While at Peniche jail, he and the other freedom fighters, Tristão de Bragança Cunha, Purushottam Kakodkar, José Inácio Candido de Loyola and Laxmikant Bhembre, hosted the newlywed Pundalik Gaitonde and Edila Gaitonde for their honeymoon. These prisoners organised a celebration in honour of Pundalik and Edila. They hosted a meal for the newly-weds.

Hegde remained at Peniche, except for an eleven-month medical treatment at Lisbon, and was released on Amnesty on 7 December 1950. However, he was kept under surveillance and was not allowed to return to India.

He then worked as a medical propagandist and gave private tuition for a living. He and Purushottam Kakodkar were detained once again for 2 months in 1955 for defying and not reporting to the PIDE office every day.

He then obtained a UK passport, and, accompanied by his Portuguese wife Maria Amelia and Purushottam Kakodkar, returned to Bombay via London on 17 May 1956. In Bombay, he started a medical clinic and immediately resumed the work of the NCG. He then attempted to unite the NCG's two warring factions in Bombay.

In June 1957, Hegde was part of a delegation of 11 Goans chosen for consultation by then Prime Minister of India, Jawaharlal Nehru. Others included Armando Menezes and his brother Nicolau Menezes, along with Luis Gracias, J. N. Heredia, Evágrio Jorge, Vishwanath Lawande, Pundalik Gaitonde, Gerald Pereira, Peter Alvares and Purushottam Kakodkar.

Hegde represented the NCG at the Goan Political Convention held in Bombay on 2–4 October 1959. He was chosen as one of 25 members of the Goa Council formed at the convention. In 1961, he was chosen as the vice president of the NCG.

In his book Panthast, Goan writer Ravindra Kelekar blamed the failure of the non-violent Goa Freedom Movement, started by Ram Manohar Lohia, on the fights between Hegde and Purushottam Kakodkar.

=== Post-annexation of Goa ===
After the Indian annexation of Goa, he was part of the January 1962 ad-hoc committee of the NCG, which studied the problems of Goa. He then joined the Indian National Congress and remained as an active leader.

In 1972, Hegde moved to Portugal and settled there as an Indian citizen.
