= Armando Menezes =

Indian civil servant and writer (1902–1983)

- Born: 11 May 1902
- Died: 1983 (aged 80–81)
- Occupation: Professor
- Movement: Goan independence movement
- Children: George Menezes; Armida Fernandez
- Relatives: Nicolau Menezes (brother)

Armando Menezes (1902–1983) was an Indian civil servant, writer, academic and poet who wrote in English.

== Early life ==
Armando Menezes was born on 11 May 1902 in São Matias, Divar, Goa, to Luis Manuel de Menezes, a lawyer, and Arminda Correia Lobo. His brother was the freedom fighter, Nicolau Menezes, who was part of the underground radio station, Voice of Freedom, that transmitted across Portuguese Goa from 1955 to 1961, advocating the cause of the Goan independence movement.

== Career ==
Armando Menezes and his family, c. 1940s

After a Portuguese education in Goa, Menezes completed his higher studies at the Bombay University. At the M.A. Examination of the university he obtained the coveted Chancellor's gold medal in Latin. He taught at St Xavier's College Bombay, his own alma mater, where he became head of the department of English. Later he taught English at Karnataka College Dharwad, where he rose to become Principal. He became the first professor and chairman of the department of English in Karnatak University and some of the early.professors were his.doctoral students. Prof Menezes successfully translated Vachana Literature from Kannada into English with the assistance of S S Malawad, Prof Yeravintelimath and Prof Sarojini Shintri who was his doctoral student. This translation work is his substantial contribution to the native literature.

He was appointed Undersecretary of Education by the Government of the Bombay State and retired from his long career as an educator after this posting.

Dr Patil Puttappa in one of his Kannada articles on memorable teachers has specified that Nanabhoy Palkhivala, the famous Indian lawyer and constitutional expert, was his student. He always mentioned that he had the highest regards for the oratorical and teaching skills of Prof Armando Menezes.

In June 1954, the Goa Liberation Council was formed in Bombay, with Armando Menezes and his brother Nicolau Menezes as members. They published a fortnightly journal, Goan Tribune, with the intention of highlighting the atrocities of the Portuguese in Goa. This was then distributed by them to political leaders from both India and of western countries.

In June 1957, Menezes was part of a delegation of 11 Goans chosen for consultation by then Prime Minister of India, Jawaharlal Nehru. Others included his brother Nicolau Menezes, along with Luis Gracias, J. N. Heredia, Peter Alvares, Evágrio Jorge, Vishwanath Lawande, Rama Hegde, Gerald Pereira, Pundalik Gaitonde and Purushottam Kakodkar.

Armida Fernandez and George Menezes were his children.

== Death ==
He died in 1983 in Bombay.
