= Gerald Pereira =

Indian trade unionist (1929–1976)

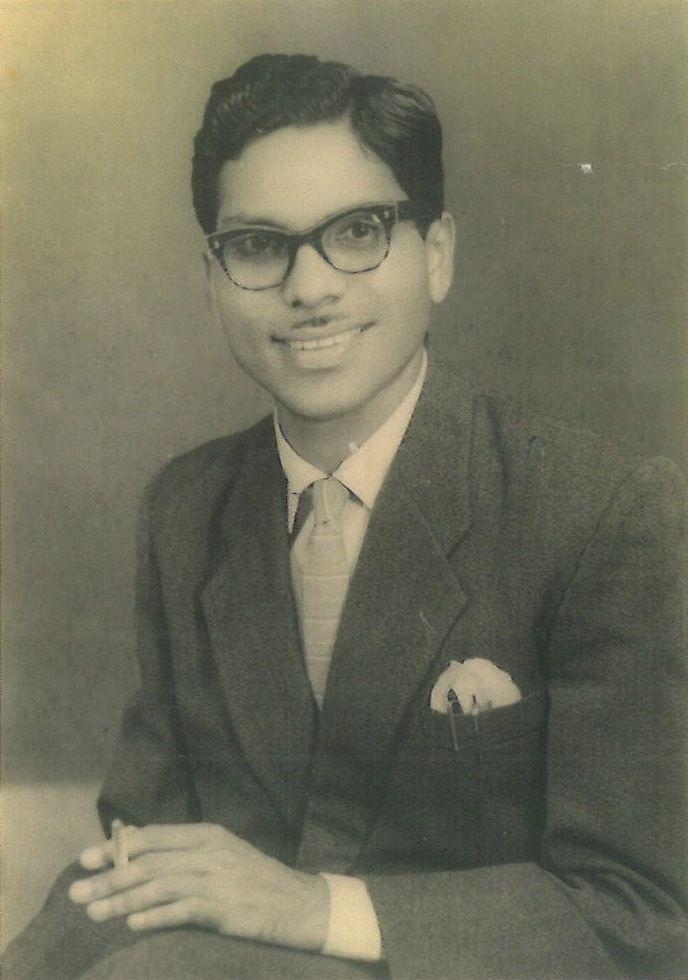
- Pereira in the 1950s
- Born: Gerald Antonio Eustaqio de Monte Pereira; 20 September 1929; Vasco da Gama, Goa, Portuguese India
- Died: 4 March 1976 (aged 46); Vasco da Gama, Goa, India
- Education: St. Xavier's College, Mumbai (M.A.); Siddharth College of Law, Mumbai (LL.B)
- Occupation: Lawyer
- Years active: 1950s–1976
- Notable work: An Outline of Pre-Portuguese History of Goa (1973)
- Political party: Communist Party of India (Marxist) (1967–1976)
- Other political affiliations: Goan Peoples Party (1950s–1960s); Frente Popular (1963)
- Movement: Goan independence movement
- Spouse: Luisa Carvalho (m. 1960)
- Children: 3

Gerald Antonio Eustaqio de Monte Pereira (20 September 1929 – 4 March 1976) was an Indian independence activist, author, lawyer and trade unionist. An active contributor in the Goan independence movement, he founded the first trade union in Goa.

== Early life ==
Gerald Antonio Eustaqio de Monte Pereira was born on 20 September 1929 in Vasco da Gama, Goa in Portuguese India, to the Goan Catholic family of Xavier Pereira, who worked for a technical firm in Bombay, British India. While studying at the St Joseph's Institute in Vasco, Pereira began participating in the Goan independence movement after being influenced by his school teacher, Dattatraya Deshpande, who was also an independence activist. Deshpande was arrested after he hoisted the Indian flag and distributed nationalist pamphlets in Vasco. Pereira escaped to Bombay, leaving his education incomplete. He then completed his Senior Cambridge schooling in Bombay.

== Goan independence movement (1952–1955) ==
While in Bombay, Pereira completed his Master of Arts (MA) at St. Xavier's College, and a Bachelor of Laws (LLB) from Siddharth College of Law. He soon took an interest in Marxist philosophy. In the early 1950s, he joined the Goan People's Party (GPP), which was Communist. On 13 December 1952, while he was still a student, he participated actively in a demonstration that displayed black flags to the then Governor-General of Portuguese India, who was visiting the Taj Mahal Palace Hotel.

Pereira was a member of the GPP's central committee and the editor of its publication, Goan Age. In its inaugural edition, published on 26 January 1954, Pereira wrote an article, Goa: Another Korea, which analyzed how Americans had strengthened their military presence near Goa. As part of the GPP, he also addressed many public meetings on issues like the planning of satyagrahas, encouragement of women to join the independence movement, and the removal of the economic blockade of Goa.

Pereira also published flyers and booklets related to Goan independence movement, including Viva 18th June Movement and Goan Question Reconsidered. He also contributed to newspapers like the National Herald, Amrita Bazar Patrika and The Free Press Journal. He also edited the Konkani journal Novem Jivit (New Life).

In 1955, during the mass satyagraha at Patradevi in Portuguese Goa, Pereira was an organiser of the satyagrahis, while Luisa Carvalho, whom he later married, was one of the leaders of the Medical Brigade of the GVSS.

In May 1957, he contested the municipal elections for the Bombay Municipal Corporation from Mazgaon constituency and lost. In June that year, he was part of a delegation of eleven Goans chosen for consultation by then Prime Minister of India, Jawaharlal Nehru. (Note: Others included Armando Menezes and his brother Nicolau Menezes, along with Luis Gracias, J. N. Heredia, Evágrio Jorge, Vishwanath Lawande, Pundalik Gaitonde, Rama Hegde, Peter Alvares and Purushottam Kakodkar.)

Pereira was active in Bombay's trade union movement, and worked with independence activist T. B. Cunha, fellow communists such as B. T. Ranadive, Shripad Amrit Dange and Gangadhar Adhikari. He was also the Secretary of the T. B. Cunha Memorial Committee.

== Post-annexation of Goa ==
=== Trade unionism (1962–1974) ===
After the Indian annexation of Goa on 19 December 1961, Pereira led a strike in the port harbour on 12 January 1962 and founded the first trade union in Goa in Mormugao Port, the Marmagao Port, Dock and Transport Workers' Union, now known as the Mormugao Waterfront Workers' Union, on 20 January 1962.

In 1964–1965, Pereira led another strike of the Port workers for the formation of the Mormugao Dock Labour Board. Pereira was then arrested and imprisoned in the Bicholim sub-jail.

In 1973–1974, Pereira led another strike of the Coca-Cola workers in Goa. This led to the formation of the Action Committee of Trade Unions and Mass Organisations in Goa.

=== Book on history of Goa ===
While Pereira was a student of politics and economics, he was convinced to pursue his masters in history. As part of his masters thesis, he studied the history of Goa. He researched at Asiatic Society of Bombay and was guided by many, including polymath Damodar Dharmananda Kosambi. He completed his thesis in 1963 and about 10 years later, he self-published it as a book, titled, An Outline of Pre-Portuguese History of Goa. It covered the history of Goa, including the early settlers, Bhoja kings, the Silaharas, the Kadamba dynasty, Vijayanagara Empire, Adil Shahi rule, ending with the Portuguese conquest of Goa. Sandesh Prabhudesai describes Pereira as "an expert in history and political science".

=== Political career (1962–1968) ===
Pereira was one of the founders of the Goa branch of the Communist Party of India (CPI), and the Communist Party of India (Marxist) (CPI(M)), after the CPI split in Goa in 1967–1968. He was also the General Secretary of the Goa branch of the Centre of Indian Trade Unions (CITU) and before that, of the All India Trade Union Congress (AITUC). Pereira was a member of the CITU Working Committee.

On 27 November 1962, Pereira was arrested at Londa, Karnataka, for being a part of the Communist Party of India, and for allegedly being "Pro-China", in the background of the Sino-Indian War.

Pereira and other Goan Communists, like George Vaz and Berta de Menezes Bragança, began working with the Goan peasants soon after the annexation of Goa, forming the Shetkari Paksh (Farmers' Party). In the 1963 Goa, Daman and Diu Legislative Assembly election, they did not contest with their Communist symbols but instead contested as a political front, the Frente Popular. This was done to not attract the attention of the Goan Catholic Church, who considered the Communists as a threat. Pereira contested elections from the Mormugao Assembly constituency. He was defeated by Urminda Mascarenhas.

Pereira later unsuccessfully contested in the 1967 Goa, Daman and Diu Legislative Assembly election.

=== Other work ===
In 1966, Pereira was chosen to visit the Soviet Union as part of the AITUC delegation of the Indo-Soviet Cultural Society (ISCUS). He was also a part of organisations like the Goan Arts and Culture League, Goa Mundkar and Shetkari Sabha, and the Indo-Cuban Solidarity Centre (CESIC).

== Personal life ==
Pereira married Luisa Carvalho, a medical practitioner and independence activist, on 24 December 1960 under the Special Marriage Act, 1954. She was also an active member of the CPI(M) and CITU in Goa. Together, they had 3 children, none of whom were initiated into any religion. Pereira lived in Vasco and Bombay, moving to Bombay after he was outlawed in his school days and came back to Vasco only after the annexation of Goa.

== Illness and death ==
Pereira had a heart attack on 2 June 1975 and was admitted to KEM Hospital, Bombay. After his discharge the following month, he began working on an underground campaign against the Indian Emergency while recuperating in Bombay. He moved back to Goa in February 1976 and immediately continued his trade union work. He died on 4 March 1976, after suffering another heart attack.

== Works ==
- Viva 18th June Movement
- Goan Question Reconsidered
- Editor, Selected Writings of Dr. T. B. Cunha
- An Outline of Pre-Portuguese History of Goa (1973)
