= Laxmikant Bhembre =

Indian independence activist (1906–1985)

- Portrait of Laxmikant Bhembre
- Born: Laxmikant Venkatesh Prabhu Bhembre; 2 August 1906; Rivona, Portuguese Goa
- Died: 1 September 1985 (aged 79)
- Other name: Ekalavya
- Movement: Goan independence movement
- Children: Uday Bhembre

Laxmikant Venkatesh Prabhu Bhembre (2 August 1906 – 1 September 1985) was an Indian independence activist and teacher. He was a member of the Sanghatna Samiti, which was renamed as Gomantak Congress.

== Early life ==
Laxmikant Venkatesh Prabhu Bhembre was born on 2 August 1906 at Rivona, Portuguese Goa to Venkatesh Anant Prabhu Bhembre. He completed his third year of Lyceum, matriculation government service examination and Sanad for legal practice.

== Career ==
=== Teaching career ===
Bhembre was a teacher who taught at Union High School and Popular High School in Margao.

=== Early political activities ===
Bhembre was a leading member of the political organisation, Sanghatna Samiti, that was later renamed as the Gomantak Congress (i.e. Goa Congress). This group worked in secret to create awareness about Goa's independence, before the unification of the National Congress Goa (NCG).

In August 1946, Bhembre chaired a significant meeting in Londa, which led to the establishment of the National Congress of Goa (NCG). He was a founding member of its executive committee and took part in the Satyagraha campaign in Margao. His involvement in these activities led to his arrest and trial under Portuguese rule. In October 1946, he was sentenced to a four-year prison term and was subsequently deported to Portugal.

=== Imprisonment in Portugal ===
Upon his arrival in Lisbon in January 1947, Bhembre was incarcerated at Peniche Fort along with other political detainees. During his imprisonment, he protested the lack of separation between political and non-political prisoners, including participating in a hunger strike. These efforts resulted in adjustments to the Portuguese prison policies.

While at Peniche jail, he and the other independence activists, Rama Hegde, Purushottam Kakodkar, José Inácio Candido de Loyola and T. B. Cunha, hosted the newlywed Pundalik Gaitonde and Edila Gaitonde for their honeymoon. These prisoners organised a celebration in honour of Pundalik and Edila. They hosted a meal for the newlyweds.

After his release in October 1950, he remained under police surveillance in Lisbon, as the Portuguese authorities did not permit his return to Goa. This surveillance continued until December 1961.

=== Life in Exile ===
While living in Portugal, Bhembre joined the Theosophical Society and became active in cultural and religious discussions. He delivered speeches on the Bhagavad Gita and wrote columns for various publications, including Dudhasagar (Bombay) and Navjeevan (Belgaum), using the pen name Ekalavya.

=== Post-annexation of Goa ===
After Indian annexation of Goa, Bhembre was briefly imprisoned from December 1961 to April 1962. Upon his release, he returned to Goa in May 1962, where he continued his intellectual and literary career. He wrote a Marathi book on the cultural and religious influence of the Portuguese rule in Goa, titled, Purutgali Rajvaticpurviche Govyatil Dharmik Vangmay.

== Personal life ==
Poet and politician Uday Bhembre is his son.

== Awards and accolades ==
Bhembre received recognition for his contributions, including a Tamrapatra Award from the Indian government. He was also honoured by the Government of Goa, Daman, and Diu for his role in the Goan independence movement. He has also been acknowledged by various cultural and literary organizations for his contributions.

== Death ==
Bhembre died on 1 September 1985.
