= Janardan Shinkre =

Indian politician (1916–unknown)

Janardan Jagannath Shinkre

Member of Parliament, Lok Sabha
- In office 1967–1971
- Preceded by: Peter Alvares
- Succeeded by: Purushottam Kakodkar
- Constituency: Panjim

Personal details
- Born: 24 June 1916 Siolim, Portuguese Goa
- Died: Unknown

Janardan Jagannath Shinkre (24 June 1916 – unknown) was an Indian independence activist, journalist, and politician. He served as a Member of Parliament in the 4th Lok Sabha, representing the Panaji constituency, and was a founding member and the first General Secretary of the Maharashtrawadi Gomantak Party.

== Early life and education ==
Shinkre was born on 24 June 1916 in the village of Siolim, Bardez taluka, in what was then Portuguese Goa. He completed his Marathi secondary education, followed by three years at the Liceu de Goa and the Curso da Escola Normal teacher training program.

== Goan independence movement (1933–1961) ==
Shinkre's activism began in 1933 at the age of 17, when he joined the Indian National Congress as a student and participated in a clandestine flag-hoisting ceremony at Campal, Panaji. Between August 1939 and January 1948, he worked as a government primary school teacher in Silvassa, Colem, and Chodan. His nationalist activities led to his dismissal from government service in 1948.

He was a prominent figure in the National Congress (Goa) (NCG) from 1948 to 1956, eventually serving as the Joint Secretary of its Bombay branch. During the Quit India Movement, he operated in South Bombay and Maharashtra, facilitating the supply of funds and ammunition to revolutionaries. Following the satyagraha led by Ram Manohar Lohia, he worked under Rama Hegde for the NCG and established an underground propaganda unit, the Comité da Secção da Propaganda (CSP).

In 1948, Shinkre established a branch of the Socialist Party at Dodamarg. In 1952, along with associates Gilbert Rebello, Frank Andrades, Pandurang Cuncolienkar, and Madhukar Dhargalkar, he founded the "Quit Goa Organisation" (QGO). He also served as the Secretary of the Goan National Conference until 1956. For his role in the Goan independence movement, Shinkre was twice sentenced in absentia by Portuguese authorities and also served a period of imprisonment.

== Journalistic career and publications ==
Shinkre utilized the press to mobilize public opinion against colonial rule. After Indian annexation of Goa, he continued his journalistic pursuits to contribute to Goan public discourse.

Publication	Type	Period	Language(s)	Description
Jwala	Underground Bulletin	Pre-annexation	Portuguese, English, Marathi, and Gujarati	A widely circulated clandestine bulletin for nationalist propaganda.
Dipagriha	Weekly Newspaper	Pre-annexation	Marathi	Published from Bombay; dedicated to the Goan independence movement
Pradeep	Fortnightly/Bi-weekly	Post-annexation	Marathi	Established after 1961 to engage with post-annexation issues.
NCG materials	Pamphlets and booklets	Pre-annexation	Various	Underground distribution of wall posters and works by T. B. Cunha.

== Post-annexation and political career ==
Following the Indian annexation of Goa in 1961, Shinkre became a founding member of the Maharashtrawadi Gomantak Party (MGP) and served as its first General Secretary in 1962.

=== The Shinkre Controversy (1963) ===
In the lead-up to the first assembly elections in 1963, Shinkre became the center of a major internal rebellion within the MGP. He strongly opposed a proposed alliance with the Praja Socialist Party (PSP), which would have seen the MGP cede certain seats to PSP leaders like Peter Alvares. Shinkre was further aggrieved by the party's refusal to field his preferred candidates in constituencies like Ponda.

In protest, Shinkre filed his nomination for the North Goa Lok Sabha seat as a "dummy" candidate to prevent the official MGP candidate from running unopposed if the party withdrew its support. In response, MGP leader Dayanand Bandodkar stripped Shinkre of his authority to issue party symbols (B Forms) and formally snapped ties with him on 18 November 1963. Shinkre subsequently contested the election as an independent candidate using the "Two Leaves" symbol—a symbol later associated with anti-merger sentiments. He ultimately forfeited his deposit, polling only 3,226 votes in that election.

=== Later career ===
Despite the earlier disagreements, Shinkre remained active in Goan politics. In the 1967 Indian general election, he was elected to the Lok Sabha representing the Panaji constituency on an independent ticket, with the support of the MGP. He continued contesting as an independent candidate in both seats, North Goa and South Goa, till the 1987 elections, but never crossed beyond 2000 votes and thus lost every election. He later served as the vice-president of the Ponda Municipal Council in 1972.
