= Mark Fernandes =

Indian independence activist (1926–1978)

Mark Agostinho Fernandes
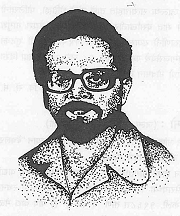
- Born: 28 May 1926; Quetta, Balochistan
- Died: 20 August 1978 (aged 52); Panaji, Goa, India
- Occupation: Independence activist
- Known for: Goan independence movement

Mark Agostinho Fernandes (28 May 1926 – 20 August 1978) was an Indian independence activist who participated in the Goan independence movement. He was a prominent member of several nationalist organizations, including the National Congress (Goa) and the United Front of Goans.

== Early life ==
Fernandes was born on 28 May 1926 in Quetta, Balochistan. He was the son of Anselmo Estevão Fernandes. He received his education in Karachi, where he completed his Senior Cambridge exams.

In his early professional life, Fernandes worked for an oil corporation in Kuwait. However, he was eventually expelled by the Kuwaiti authorities for his activities in unionizing the Goan workers in Kuwait.

== Activism ==
Following his expulsion from Kuwait, Fernandes moved to Bombay in 1946. In Bombay, he established the Young Pioneers Literary Club and became a member of the Goan Youth League (GYL) in 1951. By 1951, he was also serving as the joint secretary of the Goan Youth League as well as the joint secretary of the United Front of Goans (UFG).

Fernandes later joined the National Congress (Goa) (NCG). He worked under the leadership of Peter Alvares and was a member of the executive committee of the NCG in 1952.

He was actively involved in the Satyagraha movement in Goa. On 15 August 1954, he led a group of 12 Satyagrahis into Goa via the border towns of Banda and Torshem (also known as Torshe or Terem) in Pernem taluka. He was arrested alongside his associates at Naibag and taken to the Nova Goa police station.

== Trial and imprisonment ==
Fernandes was tried by the Territorial Military Tribunal (TMT) on 18 April 1955. He was sentenced to eight years of rigorous imprisonment, followed by two years of detention as a security measure. Additionally, his political rights were suspended for 15 years.

He was initially held at Aguada jail before being transferred to Reis Magos jail on 3 June 1955. He was eventually released on 16 October 1959. Among his associates during this period were Anthony D'Souza, Alfred Afonso, S. S. Carvalho, Kanta Hegde Desai, Shashikant Narvekar, and Flaviano Dias.

== Later life and death ==
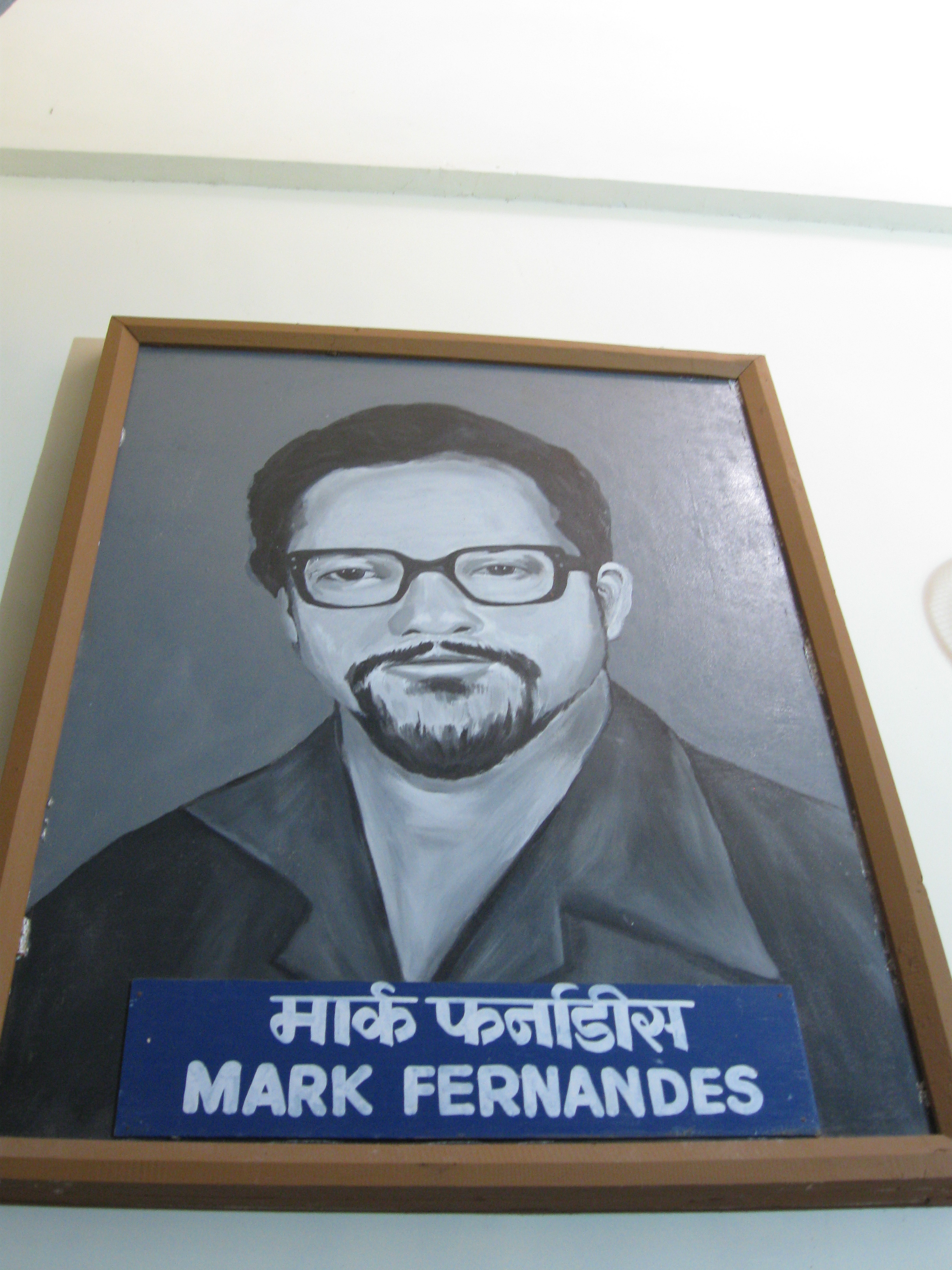
Portrait of Fernandes at the Goa State Museum

After his release, Fernandes worked in service.

Fernandes was killed in a freak accident in Panaji on 20 August 1978 when a bus lost control and killed him and Evágrio Jorge. Fernandes was a member of the Janata Party at the time of his death.

On 18 June 1984, he was honored posthumously by the Government of Goa, Daman and Diu with a citation (Manpatra).
