= Anastacio Almeida =

Indian independence activist (1929–1978)

- Born: Anastacio Tomacinho Barnabe de Almeida; 12 July 1929; Velim, Goa, Portuguese India
- Died: 25 May 1978 (aged 48)
- Education: Bachelor of Arts
- Movement: Goan independence movement
- Spouse: Shashikala Hodarkar

Anastacio Tomacinho Barnabe de Almeida (12 July 1929 – 25 May 1978) was an Indian independence activist and trade unionist. He was a prominent figure in the National Congress (Goa) and served as a political prisoner during the Goan independence movement.

== Early life and education ==
Anastacio Tomacinho Barnabe de Almeida was born on 12 July 1929 in the village of Velim, in the Salcete taluka, to Caetano Almeida. He completed his graduation with a Bachelor of Arts degree and also undertook a course in journalism.

== Independence activism ==
In the 1950s, while Almeida was in Bombay, he participated in student movements organized by the Praja Socialist Party. While employed at the Bank of Baroda, he became active in trade unionism. He joined the National Congress (Goa) (NCG) in early 1953 and was chosen as the secretary of its Bombay branch in 1954. He also worked alongside Felix and Urselino Almeida to establish the NCG branch in Calcutta.

Following the Satyagraha of 15 August 1954, Almeida resigned from the bank to return to Goa and dedicate himself to the independence struggle. In Goa, he engaged in clandestine political work, which included organizing secret meetings and distributing nationalist handbills. He worked closely with other activists, including Anthony D'Souza, Mark Fernandes, and Nanda Gaitonde.

== Imprisonment ==
Almeida was arrested by the Portuguese colonial authorities at his home in Velim on 15 September 1954. He was tried by the Territorial Military Tribunal (TMT) and received a sentence of eight years of rigorous imprisonment. While held at Aguada fort, he focused on conducting educational classes for fellow inmates who were illiterate and organizing debates. He also produced hand-written news bulletins in the Marathi and Konkani languages. He was released from prison in September 1958.

== Post-annexation and trade unionism ==
After the Indian annexation of Goa in 1961, Almeida continued his involvement in socio-political causes. In 1962, he organized the first Employees' Congress in Margao. He formed several labour organizations, including the Hotel Employees' Union, the Printing Press Workers' Union, and the Commercial Employees' Union.

Almeida is also credited by locals for taking the responsibility to build a protective wall around the Lohia Maidan in Margao.

== Accolades ==
In recognition of his contributions to the Goan independence movement, the Central Government awarded him the Tamrapatra.

A road in Margao was named after him in May 2024.

== Personal life ==
Almeida was married to Shashikala Hodarkar. She was also an independence activist like him and he supported her in these efforts.

== Death ==
He died on 25 May 1978.
