= J. N. Heredia =

Indian diplomat (died 1975)

- Portrait of J. N. Heredia
- Born: James Nathaniel Heredia
- Died: 1975
- Occupation: Diplomat
- Movement: Goa Liberation Movement
- Spouse: Irene Heredia

Sheriff of Bombay
- In office 1965
- Preceded by: Appat Balkrishna Nair
- Succeeded by: Gangaram Ratansi Joshi

James Nathaniel Heredia (died 1975), known popularly as J. N. Heredia, was an Indian honorary counsel and advocate of the end of Portuguese rule in Goa and its smaller territories. A road in Mumbai, J. N. Heredia Marg, is named after him. In 1965, he was honoured as the Sheriff of Bombay.

== Life ==
=== Early and personal life ===
James Nathaniel Heredia was born to a family of Goan businesspeople in Bombay. The family is originally from Divar, Goa. His father was Dr. Manoel Heredia, who started the Asian Life Assurance, an insurance company. This was later nationalised. The family also started a steamship service between Bombay and Goa.

Heredia was married to Irene, who was a writer and social worker.

=== As a diplomat ===
Heredia was appointed as the honorary consul to Brazil, and remained so for the tenure of three Brazilian ambassadors to India. He resigned in 1954, when Brazil sided with Portugal regarding the freedom of Goa.

=== Goa liberation movement ===
In June 1954, the Goa Liberation Council was formed in Bombay, with Heredia, Nicolau Menezes and his brother Armando Menezes as members. They published a fortnightly journal, Goan Tribune, with the intention of highlighting the atrocities of the Portuguese in Goa. This was then distributed by them to political leaders from both India and of western countries. Heredia's family warehouse at Ballard Estate became the headquarters for the Goa Liberation Council.

In June 1957, Heredia was part of a delegation of 11 Goans chosen for consultation by then Prime Minister of India, Jawaharlal Nehru. Others included Nicolau Menezes and Armando Menezes from the Goa Liberation Council, along with Peter Alvares, Evágrio Jorge, Vishwanath Lawande, Rama Hegde, Gerald Pereira, Pundalik Gaitonde, Luis Gracias and Purushottam Kakodkar.

=== Death ===
He died in 1975 of a heart attack.

== Awards and accolades ==
- Heredia was appointed as the honorary consul to Brazil before he resigned in 1954.
- In 1965, he was honoured as the sheriff of Bombay.
- A road in Ballard Estate in Mumbai, is named after him, being renamed from Graham Road.
- The Centre for Counselling at Sophia College for Women is named after him.
