= Nicolau Menezes =

Indian independence activist and teacher

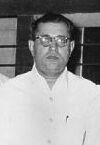
- Menezes in the 1950s
- Born: Nicolau Joao Menezes
- Occupation: Teacher
- Known for: Voice of Freedom
- Movement: Goan independence movement
- Spouse: Alda
- Relatives: Armando Menezes (brother)

Nicolau Menezes was an Indian independence activist and teacher. Along with Vaman Sardesai and Libia Lobo, he ran an underground radio station, Voice of Freedom, that transmitted across Portuguese Goa from 1955 to 1961, advocating the cause of the Goan independence movement.

== Early life ==
Nicolau Joao Menezes was from Divar and was the brother of Armando Menezes. Both brothers were teachers. He was married to Alda.

== Goan independence movement ==
Menezes lived in Bombay in hiding during the 1950s. In June 1954, the Goa Liberation Council was formed in Bombay, with Nicolau Menezes and his brother Armando Menezes as members. They published a fortnightly journal, Goan Tribune, with the intention of highlighting the atrocities of the Portuguese in Goa. This was then distributed by them to political leaders from both India and of western countries.

In June 1957, Menezes was part of a delegation of 11 Goans chosen for consultation by then Prime Minister of India, Jawaharlal Nehru. Others included his brother Armando Menezes, along with Luis Gracias, J. N. Heredia, Peter Alvares, Evágrio Jorge, Vishwanath Lawande, Rama Hegde, Gerald Pereira, Pundalik Gaitonde and Purushottam Kakodkar.

Menezes was a member of the T. B. Cunha Memorial Committee.

=== Voice of Freedom ===
In 1954–55, the Portuguese attacked and killed several unarmed Satyagrahis who had forcefully crossed the Goan borders, demanding the end of colonial rule in Goa. India then closed its borders with Goa and imposed an economic blockade, thus reducing free movement and trade. Nicolau Menezes, along with his wife Alda, came together with Libia Lobo and Vaman Sardesai to form a team. Using two wireless radio sets, which were confiscated the Portuguese, were converted into a radio transmitter. This became the Voice of Freedom radio station, through which they would transmit news and important information to Goans.

They initially lived in the jungles of Amboli Ghat, approx. 100 km (62 mi) from Goa, transmitting an hour-long programme. Living in these conditions was stressful, and Menezes and his wife eventually left. Sardesai and Lobo continued running the station until the Indian annexation of Goa on 19 December 1961.
