= Julião Menezes =

Indian nationalist leader (1909–1980)

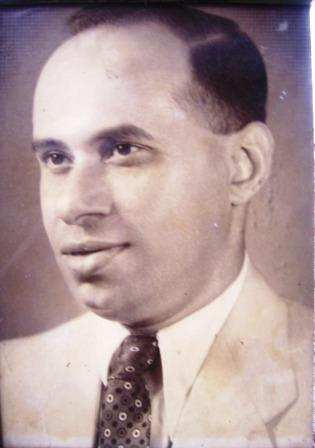
- Portrait of Menezes during his youth
- Born: 7 August 1909; Assolnã, Goa, Portuguese India
- Died: 2 July 1980 (aged 70); Dhobitalao, Bombay, Maharashtra, India
- Monuments: Lohia Chowk, Assolna, Goa, India
- Education: Berlin University (M.D)
- Occupations: Activist; medical practitioner; writer; nationalist leader
- Years active: 1930–1940s
- Notable work: Beitrag zur chirurgischen Behandlung des Nierensteinleidens (1938); Goa's Freedom Struggle (1947); Goa: What of the Future; Contra Roma E Além de Benares (1948)
- Political party: Indian National Congress (1948)
- Movement: Goan independence movement

Julião Menezes (7 August 1909 – 2 July 1980) was an Indian independence activist, medical practitioner, writer, and nationalist leader. He played a prominent role in the annexation of Goa from the Portuguese rule and was active in the Goan independence movement. Menezes established the publication Gomantak Praja Mandal, to promote nationalism among Goans. He was a member of the provisional committee of the Indian National Congress in Portuguese Goa and was present at its session in 1948. He played an active role during its formation. Menezes, along with socialist leader Ram Manohar Lohia, planned the civil disobedience movement against Salazar's regime in Goa on 18 June 1946, a day that is now celebrated as Goa Revolution Day.

== Early life ==
Julião Menezes was born on 7 August 1909 in Assolnã, Goa, which was part of Portuguese India during the Portuguese Empire (now in India), to Zeferinho Piedade Menezes, a professional seafarer, and Maria Salvacao. He was the second of six siblings: Argentina, Rupertina, Roque, Menelau, and Alzira.

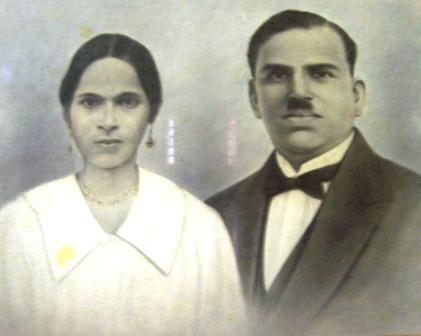
Menezes' parents: Maria Salvacao and Zeferinho Piedade Menezes

Menezes's father died when he was young, which caused financial constraints for the family. Despite this, his mother encouraged him to study at Berlin University in Weimar Republic (now Germany), from where he graduated with a medical degree.

== 1930 League of Nations session ==
During his school days, Menezes considered the Goan journalist Luís de Menezes Bragança and other prominent writers as his role models. While studying medicine at Berlin University, he met socialist political leader Ram Manohar Lohia, who was studying economics. They soon became friends and were part of the Indian Students' Union in Berlin, Weimar Republic (now Germany). Menezes also offered protection to Lohia when he went into hiding during the 1942 Quit India Movement. The initial occasion on which the pair made an impact was in 1930, during the session of the League of Nations. Lohia and Menezes, who were present on the occasion, threw bundles of leaflets from the visitors' gallery. These leaflets denounced Sir Ganga Singh, the then Maharaja of Bikaner State (now Rajasthan), and an Indian representative sent by the British Crown to present to the League of Nations.

== Role in the Goan independence movement (1938–1946) ==
In 1938, Menezes started spreading nationalistic propaganda with the support of the Juvenile Club de Assolnã. It was during this time that a library was set up as a front for the meetings of the freedom fighters of the Assolnã, Velim, and Cuncolim (AVC) villages. After the Piazza Cross in front of the Assolnã Church was found demolished, the Portuguese police suspected Menezes and the members of the club. They raided the club and library premises but were unable to arrest Menezes, who had already fled to Bombay, British India. The Portuguese later auctioned the library and club assets through the Revenue Department. Following this, the Portuguese government enforced a ban on gatherings of more than five people in the Assolnã market for three months.

=== Goa Revolution Day ===
In the 1940s, the Goan independence movement experienced increased progress, inspired by the Indian independence movement against the British government. Following a long imprisonment, Lohia met Menezes in Bombay for a medical consultation in April 1946. Menezes then invited Lohia to recuperate with him at his home in Assolnã. They reached Assolnã on 10 June 1946. After fellow freedom fighter Evágrio Jorge published the news of Lohia's arrival in the 12 June edition of O Heraldo, the general public and other local freedom fighters began visiting Menezes's house in large numbers. Menezes and Lohia then began planning a civil disobedience movement. They addressed people in Nova Goa and Mormugão between 15 and 17 June, informing people that they would defy the ban on public meetings and address an audience of Goans on 18 June in Margão.

On 18 June 1946, Menezes and Lohia arrived at the designated maidan in Margão, evading and defying the Portuguese police. They were greeted by a large crowd that was chanting slogans. About 600–700 people gathered before the duo was physically escorted to the police station, just as Lohia had begun addressing the audience. The police resorted to a baton charge to disperse the crowd. However, everyone regrouped at the police station and only left after Lohia addressed them briefly. The location of the gathering is today known as Lohia Maidan, and the date, 18 June, is celebrated as Goa Revolution Day. Menezes and Lohia continued their nationalistic efforts after this incident. While this event was deemed unsuccessful, it led to over 1,500 arrests and inspired Goans to keep protesting for their freedom, eventually leading to the annexation of Goa in 1961.

== Death ==
Menezes died as a bachelor at his residence in Dhobitalao, Bombay, on 2 July 1980, at the age of 70.

== Publications ==
In 1939, Menezes founded the Gomantak Praja Mandal in Bombay, British India with an aim to spread nationalism amongst the Goans. Three years later, in 1942, he launched a bilingual, English-Konkani weekly named Gomantak. Some of his notable publications include, Beitrag zur chirurgischen Behandlung des Nierensteinleidens (1938), Goa's Freedom Struggle (1947), Goa: What of the Future, and Contra Roma E Além de Benares (1948).

== Legacy ==
A memorial named after Menezes and his companion Ram Manohar Lohia was constructed in the Assolna market, called the Lohia Chowk.

On 18 June 1986, the Government of Goa, Daman and Diu honoured Menezes posthumously.

Lohia Chowk
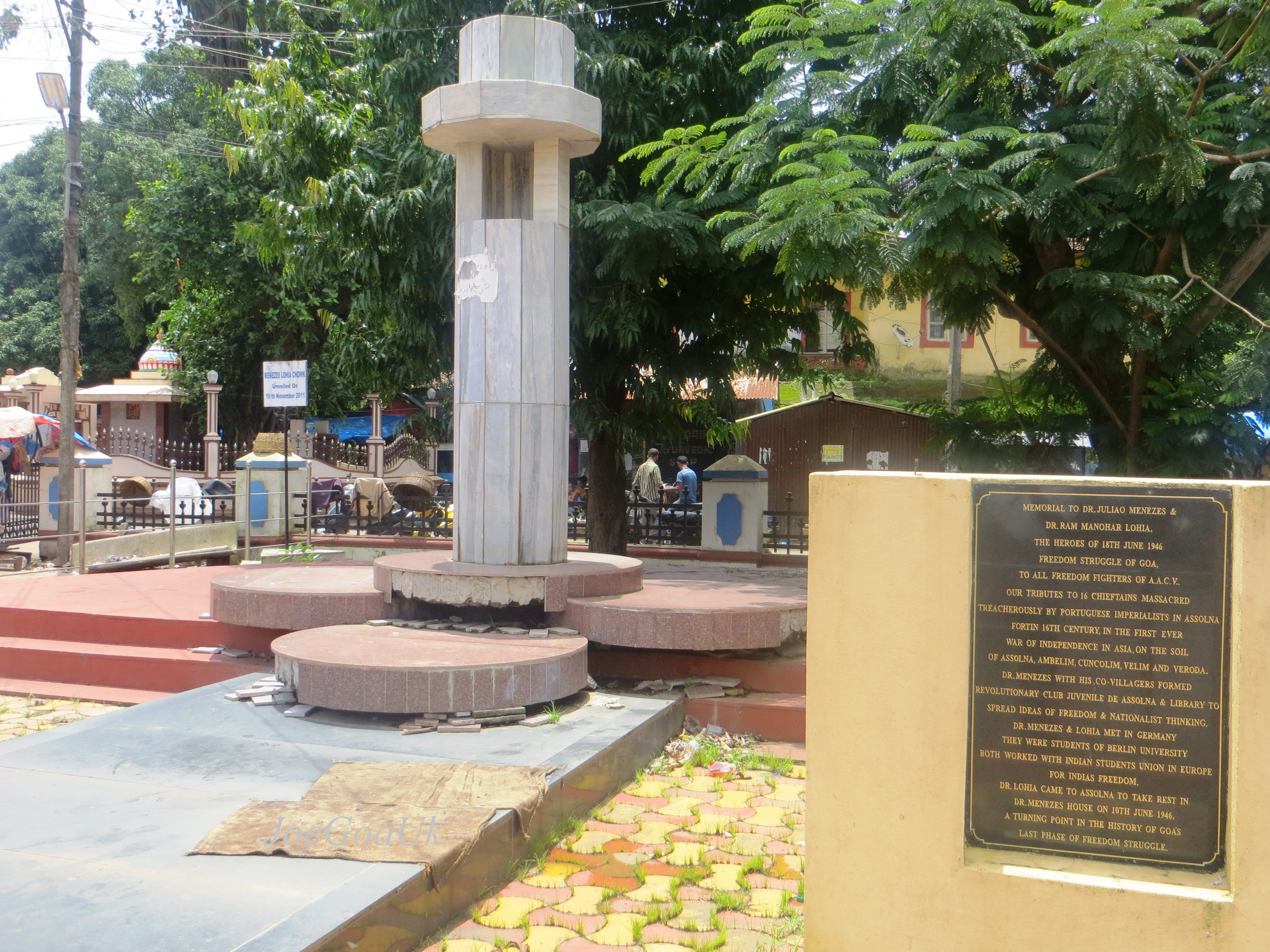
Lohia Chowk at Assolna market

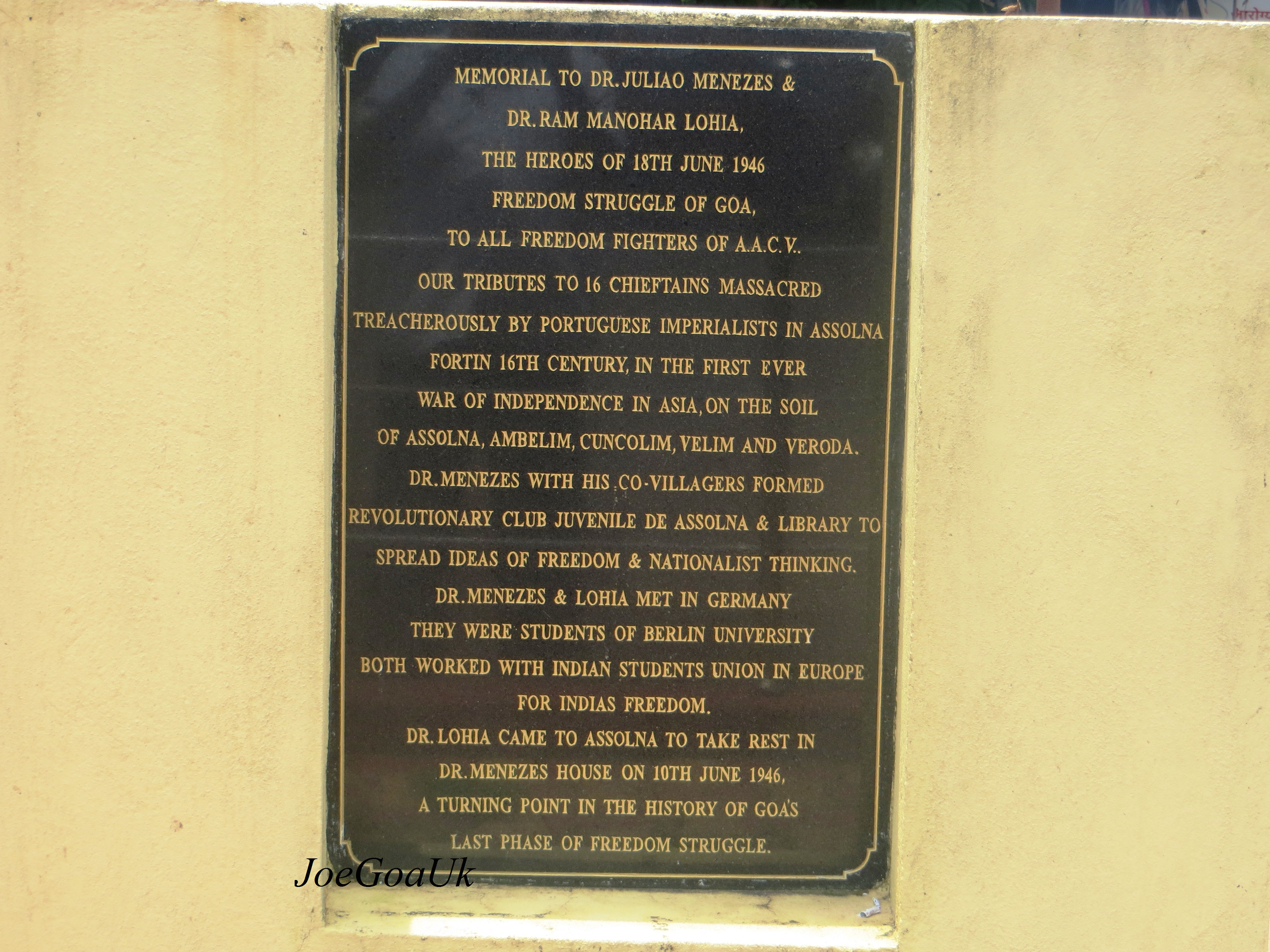
Inscription stone of Dr. Juliao Menezes and Dr. Ram Manohar Lohia
