= Pundalik Gaitonde =

Indian surgeon (1913–1992)

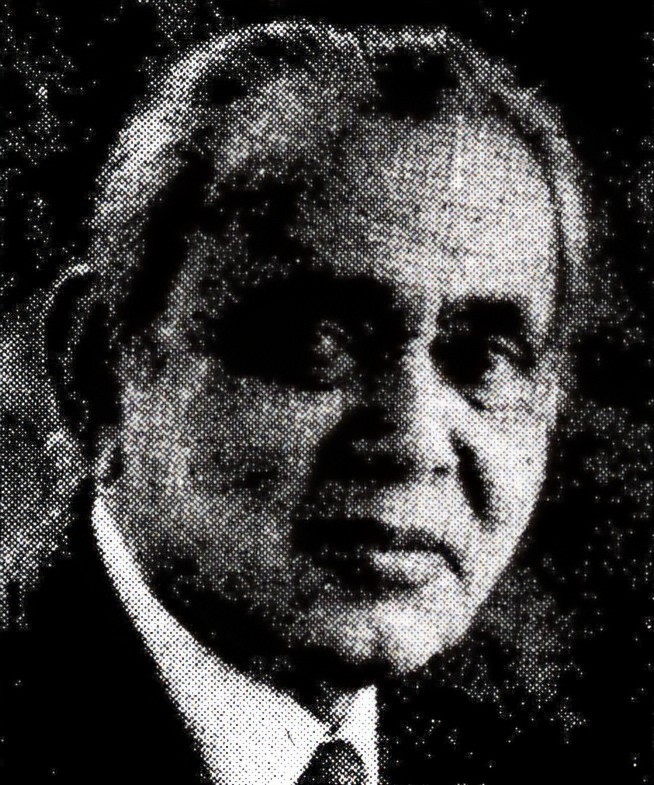

Member of Parliament, Lok Sabha
- In office 1962–1963
- Preceded by: Office established
- Succeeded by: Peter Alvares
- Constituency: Panjim

Personal details
- Born: Pundalik Dattatreya Gaitonde; 3 July 1913 Borim, Goa, Portuguese India
- Died: 13 November 1992 (aged 79) London, United Kingdom
- Party: Indian National Congress
- Spouse: Edila Gaitonde (m. 1948)
- Occupation: Surgeon

Pundalik Dattatreya Gaitonde (3 July 1913 – 13 November 1992) was a surgeon from Goa and an active participant in the Goan independence movement. Along with Antonio Colaco, Gaitonde was nominated by the President of India to the 3rd Lok Sabha in 1962 following the annexation of Goa, Daman and Diu into India on 19 December 1961.

== Early life ==
Pundalik Gaitonde was born on 3 July 1913 to Dattatreya alias Mangesh Gaitonde and Anandibai at Borim, Goa in Portuguese India. Pundalik Gaitonde's father Dattatreya hailed from Palolem in Canacona while Anandibai hailed from Borim. Pundalik Gaitonde was the third among nine siblings. His father Datatreya was a local landlord. His younger brother, Nanda, was also a participant in the Goan independence movement.

Aged five, Pundalik was initiated into education and he attended a local school. Aged eleven, the Upanayana ritual was performed. Gaitonde pursued his higher education at the Escola Primaria de Canacona at Chaudi, Canacona.

Since there were no further opportunities for higher education in Canacona, Gaitonde joined the A. J. de Almeida School at Ponda to pursue his first year of Lyceum. It was at this school that Gaitonde befriended poet Bakibab Borkar. During these years, Gaitonde mastered the Portuguese language. But since the A. J. de Almeida School did not have the facility to study the third year of Lyceum, Gaitonde went to Margao.

After successfully completing the course of Lyceum, he joined the Lyceum at Panaji. Aged twenty, Gaitonde delivered a lecture on Albert Einstein's Theory of relativity. This lecture was appreciated by many. Gaitonde also attended programmes organised by the União Académica in Panaji. Thereafter, he attended the Escola Médico-Cirúrgica de Goa to study medicine. Gaitonde then went to Portugal in order to pursue higher studies in medicine. He graduated in surgery from the Faculty of Medicine at the Lisbon University, where he was taught by António Egas Moniz (who went on to become a Nobel laureate in 1949) and Reynaldo dos Santos. During the same period, Gaitonde started his independent research regarding cancer.

== Goan independence movement ==
While working as a hospital's director in Mapusa in the 1940s, he was active in the underground activities of the National Congress (Goa) (NCG). On 1 January 1954, he attended a meeting of underground workers of the NCG, held at Sawantwadi. At this meeting, it was decided to restart the non-violent movement in Goa from 18 June 1954 (18 June is celebrated as Goa Revolution Day). He was also elected as the chairman of the executive committee at this meeting.

On 17 February 1954, while attending the farewell party of a Portuguese judge, Pundalik objected to the toast proposed by one of the invitees, saying "Eu protesto" (transl. "I protest"). This incident attracted the attention of both the Portuguese rulers, who were upset with him, and the nationalists, who were impressed. It was also the subject of multiple discussions in the Parliament of India. He was arrested the following day and deported to Portugal with his wife, Edila. He was then tried at the Lisbon High Court on 7 July 1954 and was sentenced to three months' imprisonment (including the detention period), or a fine of 40 Escudos per day in lieu of jail term. His civil rights were suspended for 12 years, and he was placed under surveillance for five years, during which time he was to not leave Portugal or associate with anyone anti-Portuguese. The NCG then celebrated 17 February 1955 as the "First Gaitonde Day", organising satyagraha across Goa.

He was released on 25 May 1955, returning to India on 14 June. He then settled in New Delhi. While there, he was tried in Goa by the TMT, who on 5 July 1955 sentenced him to 10 years rigorous imprisonment, a fine of 20 Escudos per day for two years and a suspension of his political rights for 15 years.

In June 1957, Gaitonde was part of a delegation of 11 Goans chosen for consultation by then Prime Minister of India, Jawaharlal Nehru. Others included Armando Menezes and his brother Nicolau Menezes, along with Luis Gracias, J. N. Heredia, Evágrio Jorge, Vishwanath Lawande, Gerald Pereira, Rama Hegde, Peter Alvares and Purushottam Kakodkar.

In 1960, he was elected president of the NCG at its Bombay session. He attended the Conference of the Nationalist Organisations of the Portuguese Colonies at Casablanca in 1961, along with George Vaz and Cajetan Lobo. He then visited several countries, including the United States, Brazil, United Kingdom, Sweden and USSR, and was at the United Nations representing the case of Portuguese colonies in general and Goa in particular. While in the US, he met leaders like Norman Thomas. His campaigns lead to the Seminar on Portuguese Colonies organised in New Delhi, with the help of the Indian Council for Africa.

== Post-annexation of Goa ==
After the annexation of Goa from the Portuguese by India in 1961, then Prime Minister Jawaharlal Nehru appointed Gaitonde as one of the two Members of Parliament for Goa, representing the North Goa Lok Sabha constituency (then known as the Panjim Lok Sabha constituency) on 6 August 1962. He was active in his one year as a Parliamentarian, participating in debates over issues not just concerning Goa but also national and international issues like cancer, health and drugs and international relations. He was also appointed as a member of important committees such as the one forming port authorities and another amending the Drugs and Cosmetics Act, 1940.

Also in 1962, Gaitonde and Purushottam Kakodkar were chosen as co-convenors of an ad-hoc committee of the Indian National Congress, with the intention of beginning work of the Congress in Goa.

In the 1963 Elections for Lok Sabha members from Goa, when he contested as a candidate for the Indian National Congress, he secured the third position with only 20,000 (16%) of the total votes. He was succeeded by Peter Alvares. He never contested again and quit politics.

He later became a member of the Goa Planning Board.

== Medical career ==
On his return to Goa, then still a territory of Portugal in 1948, Pundalik Gaitonde was appointed Surgeon-Director of the Hospital dos Milagres in Mapusa.

He worked as the honorary senior surgeon at the Irwin Hospital, New Delhi, in the 1950s, and was responsible for the creation of the Cancer Unit, which he headed.

After retiring from politics in Goa and moving to London, he worked as a consultant in the cancer department of the Royal London Hospital, Whitechapel in the 1960s.

He spent his later years compiling a computerised book for the treatment of cancer, marketing it to Indian doctors.

== Writing career ==
In 1983, Gaitonde wrote a book, Portuguese Pioneers in India - Spotlight in Medicine. The book covered the history of medicine and east–west relations during the sixteenth century.

His second book, The Liberation of Goa: A Participant's View of History, was released in 1986 and covered the history of the Goan independence movement.

== Personal life ==
=== Marriage ===
After Gaitonde completed his medical studies, he started his practice in Portugal. He began a relationship with one of his patients, a Portuguese woman named Edila Brum Dutra de Andrade. Edila was born at the Faial Island of the Azores and had studied music at the National Conservatory of Lisbon. Pundalik and Edila decided to marry, but faced stiff opposition from their respective families. However, Pundalik's father later relented and granted permission. Pundalik and Edila married in a civil ceremony in 1948 in Lisbon and spent their honeymoon at Peniche.

Gaitonde selected Peniche as his honeymoon destination because it was the location of the prison-fort where several activists of the Goan independence movement, such as Tristão de Bragança Cunha, Purushottam Kakodkar, Rama Hegde, José Inácio Candido de Loyola and Laxmikant Bhembre were imprisoned. These prisoners organised a celebration in honour of Pundalik and Edila. They hosted a meal for the newly-weds. A woman journalist from France was on a visit to the prison in order to meet Tristão de Bragança Cunha. When she questioned Pundalik Gaitonde about why he had selected Peniche as the destination for the honeymoon, Dr. Gaitonde replied, "Homage to sacrifice!"

=== Retirement ===
Following his defeat in the 1963 Lok Sabha elections, Gaitonde left Goa permanently for London with his wife Edila. He then worked in a hospital there till he retired and began writing.

== Death ==
Gaitonde died in London on 13 November 1992.

== Works ==
- Portuguese Pioneers in India - Spotlight in Medicine (1983)
- The Liberation of Goa: A Participant's View of History (1986)
