= Vijay Kamulkar =

Indian politician (died 2010)

Member of Goa, Daman and Diu Legislative Assembly
- In office 1963–1967
- Preceded by: constituency established
- Succeeded by: Anthony D'Souza
- Constituency: Mandrem
- Majority: 6,663 (64.70%)

Personal details
- Born: Vijay Maruti Kamulkar Pernem, Goa, Portuguese India
- Died: 14 March 2010
- Party: Shiv Sena (1989)
- Other political affiliations: Maharashtrawadi Gomantak Party (1963–1967); Independent (1967–1971); Indian National Congress (1971–1989)
- Occupation: Politician
- Committees: Public Accounts

Vijay Maruti Kamulkar (unknown – 14 March 2010) was an Indian politician who was a former member of the Goa, Daman and Diu Legislative Assembly, representing the Mandrem Assembly constituency from 1963 to 1967. Over his political tenure, Kamulkar was affiliated with Maharashtrawadi Gomantak Party, Indian National Congress and eventually Shiv Sena.

== Early life ==
Vijay Maruti Kamulkar was born in Pernem, Goa, Portuguese India during the Portuguese Empire (now part of India). He belonged to the Bahujan Samaj community and owned a tea stall.

== Career ==
Kamulkar first contested the 1963 Goa, Daman and Diu Legislative Assembly election from the Mandrem Assembly constituency on the Maharashtrawadi Gomantak Party (MGP) ticket and emerged victorious by defeating two feudal doyens, Raghunathrao Deshprabhu and Vaikunthrao Dempo, with a majority of 6,663 votes. He served for four years from 1963 to 1967.

During his tenure, Kamulkar raised concerns in debates regarding school students from economically backward classes. He then unsuccessfully contested the 1967 Goa, Daman and Diu Legislative Assembly election as an independent politician from the same constituency. Kamulkar lost to (MGP) candidate, Anthony D'Souza, by a margin of 6,885 votes.

In 1971, Kamulkar left the Maharashtrawadi Gomantak Party to contest the 1972 Goa, Daman and Diu Legislative Assembly election from the Mandrem Assembly constituency on the Indian National Congress ticket. However, he lost to his former party leader, Dayanand Bandodkar, by a margin of 6,248 votes.

After suffering significant defeats in past elections from the Mandrem Assembly constituency, Kamulkar chose not to contest in the following three elections. In the 1989 Goa Legislative Assembly election, Kamulkar left the Indian National Congress to join the Shiv Sena and subsequently contested unsuccessfully from the Pernem Assembly constituency. He was defeated by the Maharashtrawadi Gomantak Party (MGP) candidate, Shankar Kashinath Salgaonkar, by a margin of 6,932 votes.

After suffering his biggest defeat in his political career from the Pernem Assembly constituency, Kamulkar did not contest any subsequent elections. All of his defeats came at the hands of candidates from his former party, the Maharashtrawadi Gomantak Party. He maintained a low profile and avoided publicity.

== Death ==
Kamulkar died on 14 March 2010. On 22 March 2010, the Goa Legislative Assembly made an obituary reference to his honor.

== In the media ==
On 22 August 2020, during the COVID-19 pandemic, Kamulkar's family celebrated Ganesh Chaturthi with the help of a smartphone, following the government's instructions to practice social distancing and avoid gathering in large numbers.

== Positions held ==
- Chairman of Public Accounts Committee
