= Evágrio Jorge =

Indian activist and journalist (1925–1978)

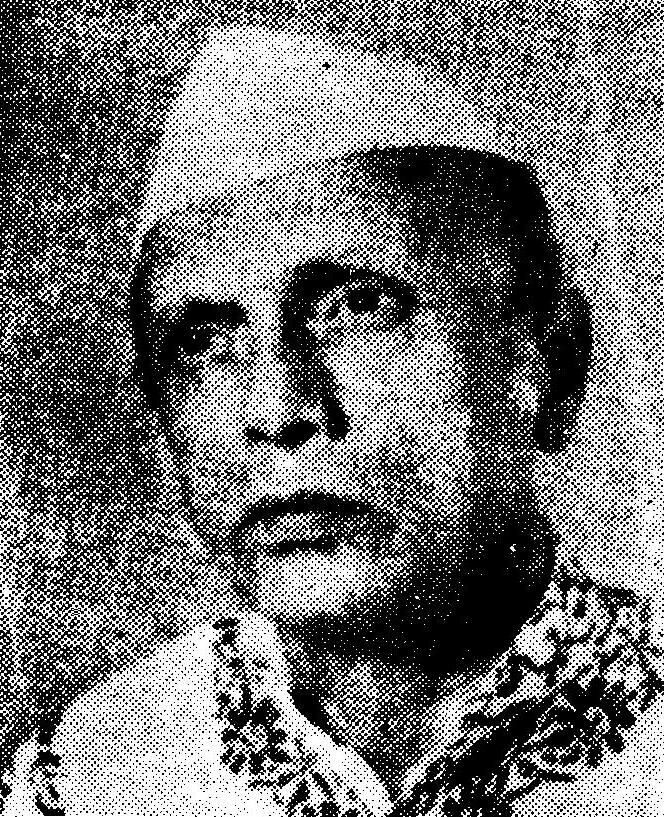
- Portrait of Jorge
- Born: Evágrio Fransisco Jorge; 6 March 1925; Carmona, Goa, Portuguese India
- Died: 20 August 1978 (aged 53); Panaji, Goa, India
- Spouse: Margarida Jorge
- Children: 2
- Awards: Tamrapatra Award (1972)

Evágrio Fransisco Jorge (6 March 1925 – 20 August 1978) was an Indian independence activist and journalist.

== Early life ==
Evágrio Fransisco Jorge was born on 6 March 1925 in Carmona, Salcete, Portuguese Goa, to Tito Manuel Jorge and Moi Sinha Rodrigues. He completed his 7th year of Lyceum education.

== Goan independence movement ==
When Ram Manohar Lohia visited Goa in June 1946, Jorge visited Lohia at the home of Julião Menezes and published the news of Lohia's arrival on the O Heraldo newspaper on 12 June. This triggered the civil disobedience movement that is today known as Goa Revolution Day. Later, Jorge went to visit Lohia in Bombay, accompanied by Purushottam Kakodkar. While there, they got to know that the then Prime Minister of India, Jawaharlal Nehru, was passing through the city. They thus met him and requested him for Goa's independence. They then received encouragement from Nehru.

In the 1940s, Jorge led a political party, Liga Regional (the Regional League). He was also one of founders of the National Congress (Goa) (NCG). He was elected as its Joint Secretary at the first meeting, held in Londa, Karnataka on 18 August 1946. On 7 November 1946, he was arrested after he offered satyagraha at Cuncolim. He was released after being imprisoned and tortured for 45 days. After his release, he was given the responsibility of the Belgaum and Khanapur satyagraha camps of the NCG.

On 15 August 1947, he was arrested again to prevent him from organizing any protests on that day. His house was then raided and nationalist literature was seized. Following this, he was put on trial by the TMT for the publishing and distribution of anti-Portuguese flyers and articles. He was then sentenced to 5 years' imprisonment, along with having his political rights suspended for 15 years.

In June 1957, he was part of a delegation of 11 Goans chosen for consultation by Prime Minister Nehru. Others included Armando Menezes and his brother Nicolau Menezes, along with Luis Gracias, J. N. Heredia, Gerald Pereira, Vishwanath Lawande, Pundalik Gaitonde, Rama Hegde, Peter Alvares and Purushottam Kakodkar.

== Career ==
As a writer and journalist, between 1942 and 1961, Jorge published about 16 flyers and books against the Portuguese government. In the 1940s, he worked for oHeraldo. Following his release from jail in the early 1950s, Jorge moved to Bombay and began contributing to T. B. Cunha's Konkani periodical, Azad Goem (transl. Free Goa). In 1955, he joined the All India Radio (AIR) for Konkani and Portuguese. After resigning from AIR in 1970, he began editing and contributing to the Konkani daily newspaper, Uzvadd. He later founded the Novem Uzvadd.

== Death ==
Jorge was killed in a freak accident in Panaji, Goa, on 20 August 1978 when a bus lost control and killed him and Mark Fernandes. Jorge was a member of the Congress (I) at the time of his death.

== Personal life ==
Jorge was married to Margarida and had two children, Subhas and Vijayalakshmi.

== Views ==
In his 1942 pamphlet, A Reforma do Vestuário, Jorge promoted khadi cloth. He lamented that both Hindus and Christians in Goa, under the Portuguese rule, wore "Western" clothes manufactured outside of India. He stated that the Catholic Church in Goa was used by the Portuguese to impose "Western (occidentals) dressing and customs". Urging Hindus to turn back to their culture, he said,

To the Hindus of Goa who, perhaps carried by a supposed superiority [of the European], leave the ancestral habits of their land and adopt those of the foreigners, as there is no greater inferiority than to accept all that is imposed on us, without the slightest reflection and criticism! Also there is no reason to be ashamed of the dress and the traditions of the country, which are admired all over the world.

== Awards and accolades ==
In 1972, Jorge was awarded the Tamrapatra Award for independence activists by the Government of India. In 1984, he was posthumously honoured by the Government of Goa, Daman and Diu.

== Works ==
Some of Jorge's works include:

- A Reform do Vestuario (1942)
- Uma decisso judicial (1943)
- Vestuario and Santos ou Arruaceiros (1944)
- Porque Ofereco Satyagraha (1946)
- Portugezanchem Raj Mhollear Goenkaranchem Nisantonn (1947)
- Goenchea Jivitacho Asro (1954)
- Salazar Ani Goem
- Goenche Utthau Ani Bonddam (1956)
- Nehru Ani Goemand Lokmanya Tilak (1957)
- Katolk Igorz Goench Sodvonnechi Chollvoll (1957)
- Salazar’s rule in Portuguese and Goa Case (1959)
- The Goa Case (1961)
- Goemkarachem Desbhoxttepon (T B Cunha-chea pustoka onkar) (1961)
- Os Bhrahamanes (1969)
- Eka monxachem noxib (Solokov-achi novol kanni) (1968)
- Nillea Dollean-chi Ostori (1969)
- Karykha (Mikhali Alexeyev - chi novol kanni) (1974)
- Ojeapam
- Vizmitam Nuvem Gavant (1974)
- Goa’s Awakening – Reminiscence of the 1946 Civil Disobedience Movement
