= Anthony de Souza (politician) =

Indian politician (1920–1981)

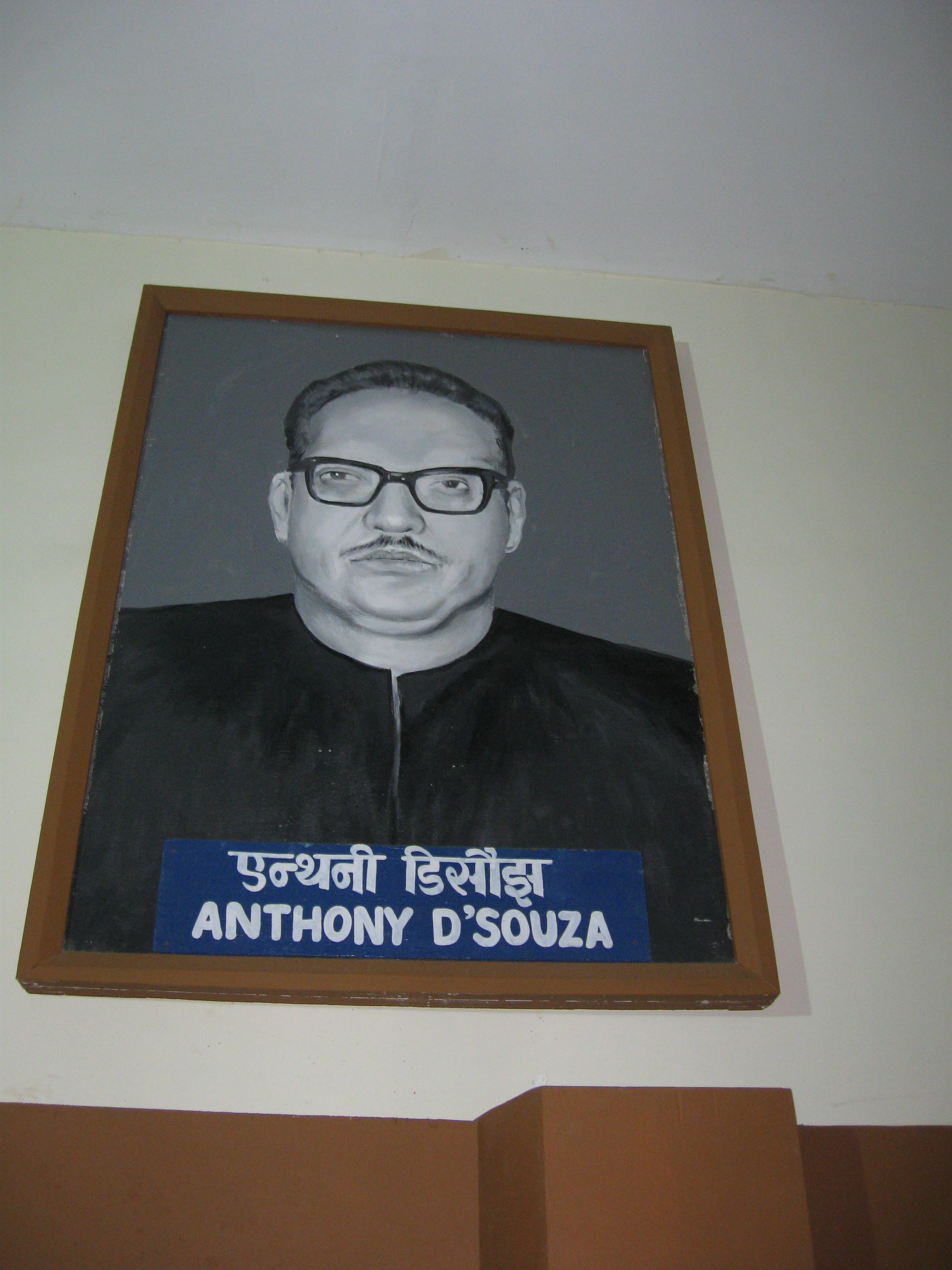
- Portrait of de Souza at the Goa State Museum

Member of Goa Legislative Assembly
- In office 1967–1972
- Preceded by: Vijay Kamulkar
- Succeeded by: Dayanand Bandodkar
- Constituency: Mandrem

Minister of Law, Agriculture, Industries and Labour in Goa, Daman and Diu government
- In office 1967–1970
- Appointed by: Dayanand Bandodkar

Personal details
- Born: Antonio Joao de Souza; 14 October 1920 Bombay, British India
- Died: 1 March 1981 (aged 60) Bombay, Maharashtra, India
- Party: Maharashtrawadi Gomantak Party

Anthony "Tony" John De Souza (14 October 1920 – 1 March 1981), also referred to as Antonio Joao de Souza and Anthony D'Souza, was an Indian independence activist, trade unionist and politician. He is best known for leading a group of Satyagrahis into Portuguese Goa in 1954 as part of a coordinated effort by the National Congress (Goa) to demand the end of Portuguese rule. After the Indian annexation of Goa, he served as a minister in the second Dayanand Bandodkar ministry and was active in various labour unions.

== Early life ==
De Souza was born on 14 October 1920 in Bombay. He completed his education up to the matriculation level. Although he initially entered a seminary with intentions of becoming a priest, he later left to travel across India, spending time in Kashi studying the Vedas.

Prior to his full-time involvement in the Goan independence movement, De Souza worked at Lloyds Bank. During his tenure there, he became involved in labour activism, serving as the General Secretary of the bank's Workers Union.

== Goan independence movement ==
De Souza joined the National Congress (Goa) in 1952 and eventually rose to the position of General Secretary within the organization.

In 1954, the National Congress (Goa), operating out of its base in Bombay, devised a strategy to mark India's Independence Day on August 15 by sending activists across the borders from the Indian Union into Portuguese Goa. The objective was to raise opposition against Portuguese rule and advocate for the annexation of Goa.

The plan involved three distinct groups entering Goa from different border points:

- A group led by Alfred Afonso, which entered via Terekhol.
- A group led by Mark Fernandes, which entered via the Banda border.
- A group led by Anthony De Souza, which entered via the Polem border.

On 15 August 1954, De Souza led a delegation of 19 Satyagrahis. The group crossed into Goa from Karwar through the Polem border in Canacona. Following their entry, the group was intercepted by Portuguese authorities. De Souza and his associates were arrested and subsequently underwent trial. In the trial documents, De Souza was identified by the Portuguese name Antonio Joao de Souza.

Following his arrest, De Souza was initially detained in Panaji. He was convicted and sentenced to 28 years of imprisonment, serving time at Fort Aguada and Reis Magos Fort. He was released in 1959, after which he returned to underground resistance activities. He was once again arrested by the police in Vasco and remained imprisoned until the Indian annexation of Goa in 1961.

== Political career ==
Following the annexation of Goa, De Souza remained active in public life. In 1963, he was elected Secretary of the District Congress Committee. He also became a founding member of the Murgaon Dock Workers Union.

He eventually joined the Maharashtrawadi Gomantak Party (MGP). In 1964, he was elected to the Panaji Municipal Corporation. Following the Goa Opinion Poll, he served as the joint secretary of the MGP. Outside of politics, he served as the State Chief Commissioner for the Bharat Scouts and Guides in Goa.

D'Souza was elected to the Goa, Daman and Diu Legislative Assembly from the Mandrem Assembly constituency in March 1967. He was appointed Minister for Law, Agriculture, Industries and Labour in the second Dayanand Bandodkar ministry. However, citing differences with the MGP leadership, he resigned from his ministerial post on 19 June 1970 and later defected against Bandodkar.

In his later political career, he joined the Indian National Congress. He continued his trade union activities, holding membership in the Goa Shipyard Workers Union, the National Engineer Workers Union, and the Indian National Trade Union Congress (INTUC). Toward the end of his life, he retired from active politics to focus on social work.

== Awards ==
On 18 June 1984, he was posthumously awarded a Tamra Patra by the Government of Goa, Daman and Diu for his services during the Goan independence movement.
