= Goa Liberation Day =

Annual observance, 19 December

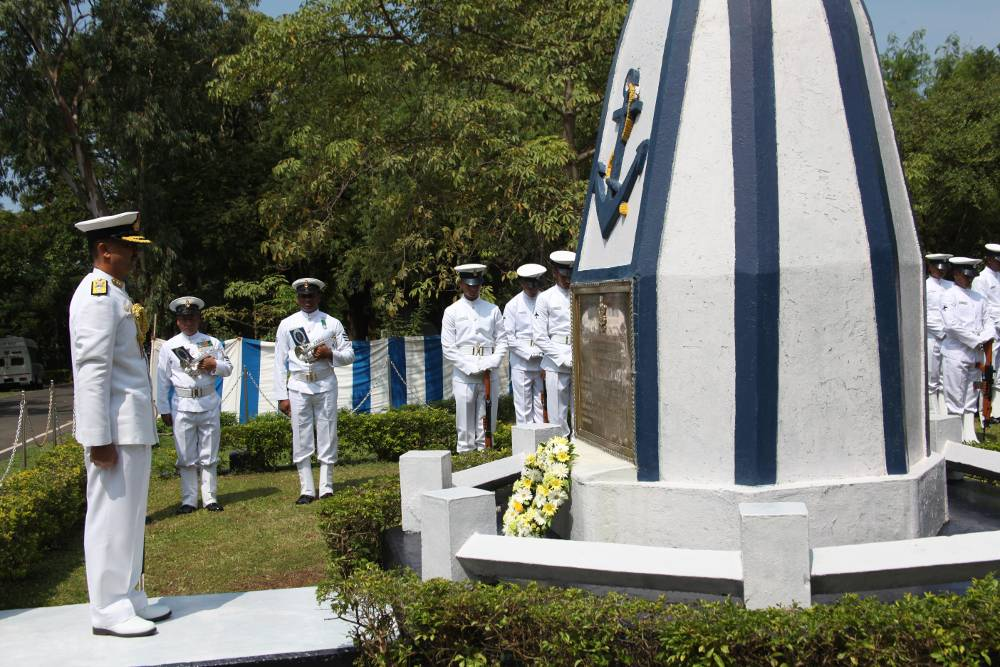
- The war memorial in 2015
- Observed by: Goans
- Significance: Annexation of Goa by Indian Armed Forces
- Date: 19 December 1961
- Frequency: Annual
- Related to: Goa liberation movement

Goa Liberation Day is observed annually on 19 December in Goa, India. It is celebrated to mark the Indian annexation of Goa from the Portuguese government in 1961, after which India was free of any European rule.

== Background ==
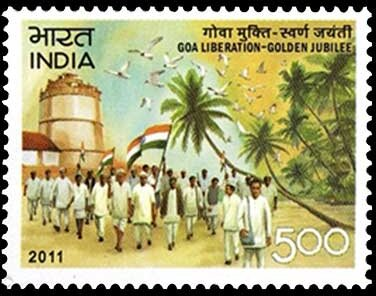
2011 Indian postage stamp dedicated to the golden jubilee of Goa's annexation

Goa was annexed by the Indian Armed Forces on 19 December 1961 after 451 years of Portuguese rule. The movement for independence in the 19th century in India had a smaller impact in Goa as well, with a few residents of participating in Satyagraha up to the 1960s. Portugal did not let Goa join India at the same time as the majority of the subcontinent granted by the British in 1947, (Note: France held territory in India until 1954.) stating that Goa was culturally and religiously distinct from the rest of India and that Goa was a part of Portugal proper rather than a colony. India didn't take any military action then, as it was more concerned with integrating the princely states. The Indian government asked Portugal to open negotiations in 1950, but after Portugal refused to respond to subsequent aide-mémoires in regards to Goa, India withdrew its diplomatic mission to Portugal on 11 June 1953. India invaded and annexed Goa in late December 1961.

== Observance ==
Various programmes organised across Goa to mark the Goa Liberation Day. In 2021, the observance consisted of a women's parliament and a youth parliament. Prime Minister of India Narendra Modi inaugurated new projects like the Super Specialty Block at the Goa Medical College and Hospital, renovation of Fort Aguada Jail Museum in North Goa, Aviation Skill Development Center at Mopa Airport, the Gas-insulated Substation at Dabolim-Navelim, Margao, and the newly constructed South Goa District Hospital.

== See also ==
- Goa liberation movement
- Annexation of Goa
- History of Goa
