= Goa Revolution Day =

Annual observance, 18 June

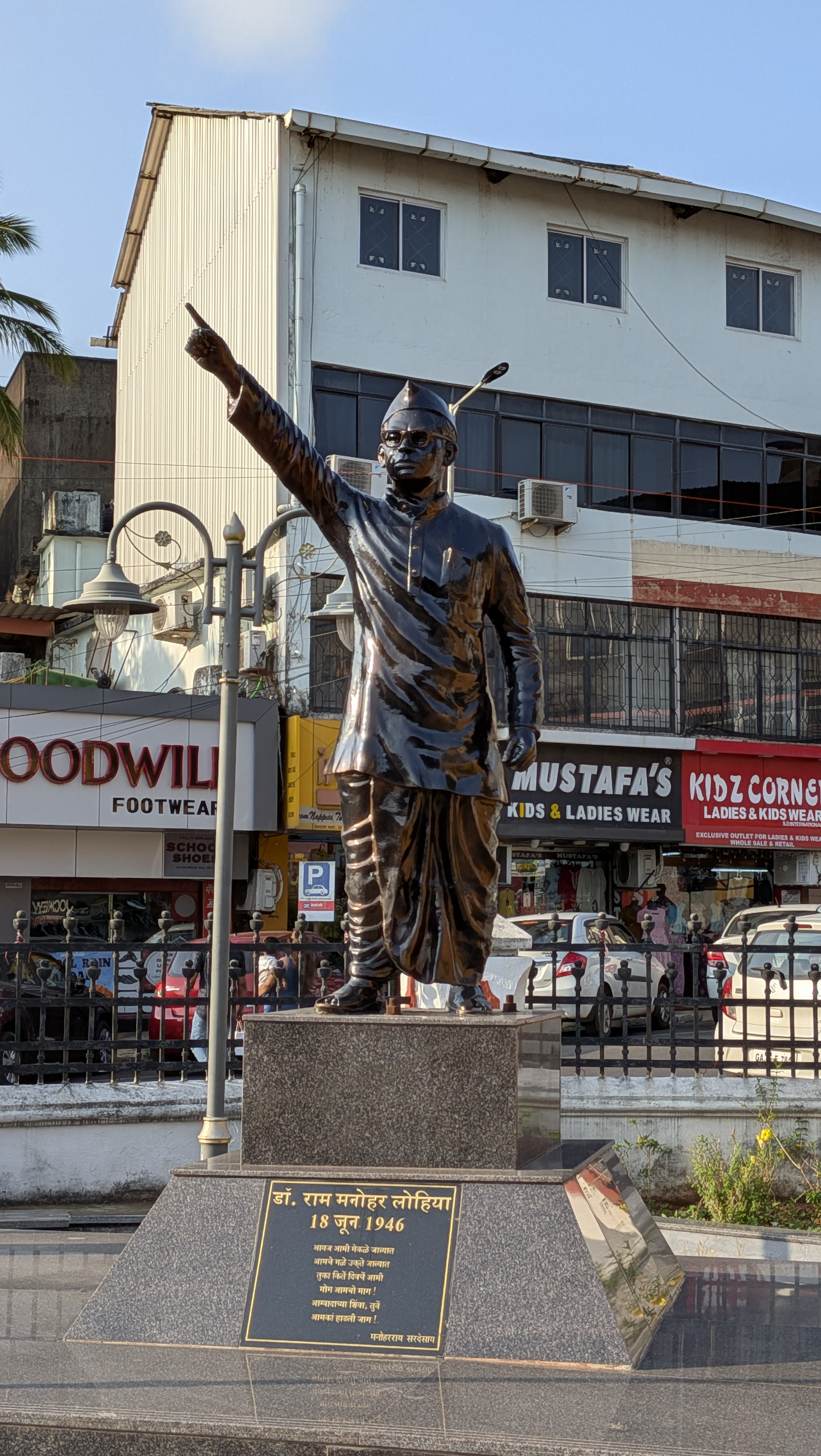
- Statue of Ram Manohar Lohia at the site where the meeting happened, today known as Lohia Maidan in Margao
- Observed by: Goans
- Significance: Triggered the Goan independence movement
- Date: 18 June 1946
- Frequency: Annual
- Related to: Goan independence movement

Goa Revolution Day, also referred to as Kranti Din, is celebrated on 18 June every year by the Government of Goa, in commemoration of the events of 18 June 1946 that triggered the Goan independence movement. This campaign was led by Indian socialist leader Ram Manohar Lohia and the Goan anti-colonial campaigner Julião Menezes.

== History ==
=== Background ===
In the 1940s, the Goan independence movement experienced increased progress, inspired by the Indian independence movement against the British government.

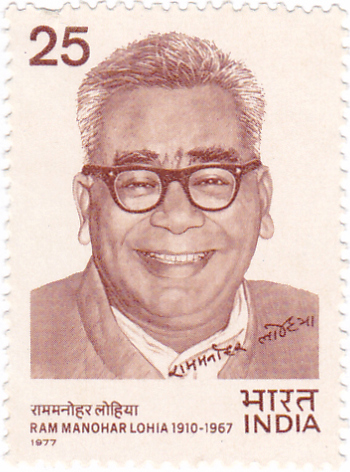
Ram Manohar Lohia on a 1977 stamp of India

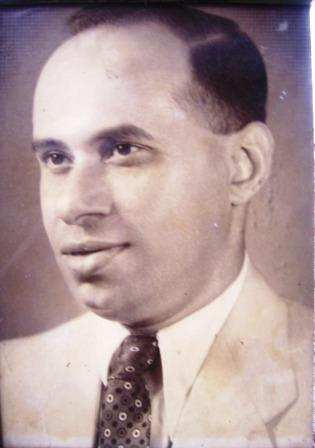
Julião Menezes, c. 1940s

Following a long imprisonment, freedom fighter Ram Manohar Lohia met his friend whom he had studied with in Germany Julião Menezes in Bombay for a medical consultation in April 1946. Menezes then invited Lohia to recuperate with him at his home in Assolnã, Goa.

=== Arrival in Goa ===
Lohia and Menezes reached Assolna on 10 June 1946. After Evágrio Jorge published the news of Lohia's arrival in the 12 June edition of O Heraldo, it triggered the general public and other local freedom fighters, including Purushottam Kakodkar, to visit Menezes's house in large numbers.

Menezes and Lohia then began planning a civil disobedience movement. They addressed people in Pangim and Mormugão between 15 and 17 June, informing people that they would defy the ban on public meetings and address an audience of Goans on 18 June in Margão. They returned to Margao on 17 June and met other nationalists at Damodar Vidyalaya. They suspected that the police would be waiting for them in Assolna, so they stayed at the Hotel Republica in Margao.

=== Police action ===
On 18 June 1946, the police had requested all taxis in the Salcete taluka (surrounding Margão) to present to Margao Police Station with their passengers. The police also surrounded the designated maidan in Margão where the gathering would take place; however, a few hopeful people stayed at the maidan in anticipation. However, Menezes and Lohia arrived by horse-drawn carriage at the venue. As the two arrived at the venue, they were greeted by a large crowd that was chanting slogans. Three people garlanded them. Capitão Fortunato Miranda (either the Portuguese police chief or the taluka administrator, depending on the different reports) threatened Lohia with a revolver. Lohia gently pushed him aside and proceeded to address the audience. This was followed by a sudden crowd emerging around to listen to the duo. An estimated 600–700 people had gathered.

Miranda again threatened Lohia with his revolver, to which Lohia spoke to him firmly, informing Miranda that the gun did not scare him. Miranda then ordered the policemen present to physically lift the duo and escort them to the police station. The police resorted to a baton charge to disperse the crowd. However, everyone regrouped at the police station and demanded the release of the duo. Sensing that the situation was getting out of their control, the police permitted Lohia to address the people outside the police station. Lohia spoke to the audience:

Gomantak is part of Hindustan, and Portugal rules over it as the British do in the rest of the country. This is an accident, a bad dream, and it will pass. The state of Hindustan will come. Our people are creating it... I am not asking you today to overthrow Portuguese rule. That will come in its own time... People of Gomantak, think freely, speak freely, write freely...

The two were then moved to the Panjim police station. While Lohia was escorted by train to the border and let off at Castle Rock, Menezes was released the next day. The location of the gathering in Margao is today known as Lohia Maidan, and the date, 18 June, is celebrated as Goa Revolution Day.

=== Aftermath ===
The news of Lohia's arrest spread throughout India. Mahatma Gandhi then wrote to the Portuguese Governor-General, stating that "in free India Goa can not be allowed to exist as a separate entity in opposition to the laws of the free state."

Menezes and Lohia continued their nationalistic efforts after this incident. While this event was deemed unsuccessful, it led to over 1,500 arrests and inspired Goans to keep protesting for their freedom, eventually leading to the liberation of Goa in 1961. Freedom fighter and politician George Vaz described the events of this day, "18th June was like a big Light House that guided many ships traveling in the sea," referring to how Lohia inspired many Goan freedom fighters.

== Observance ==
With the intention of paying tribute to freedom fighters, the Government of Goa organises various cultural programmes to celebrate this day every year. In 2022, the day was celebrated in North Goa at the Azad Maidan, in South Goa at the Lohia Maidan and at the Kranti Maidan in Ponda. Tributes are also paid to the statue of Lohia at Lohia Maidan. Schools and educational institutions are also instructed to celebrate the day by the government.

== See also ==
- Goa Liberation Day
