= Peter Alvares =

Indian politician (1908–1975)

Peter Augustus Alvares
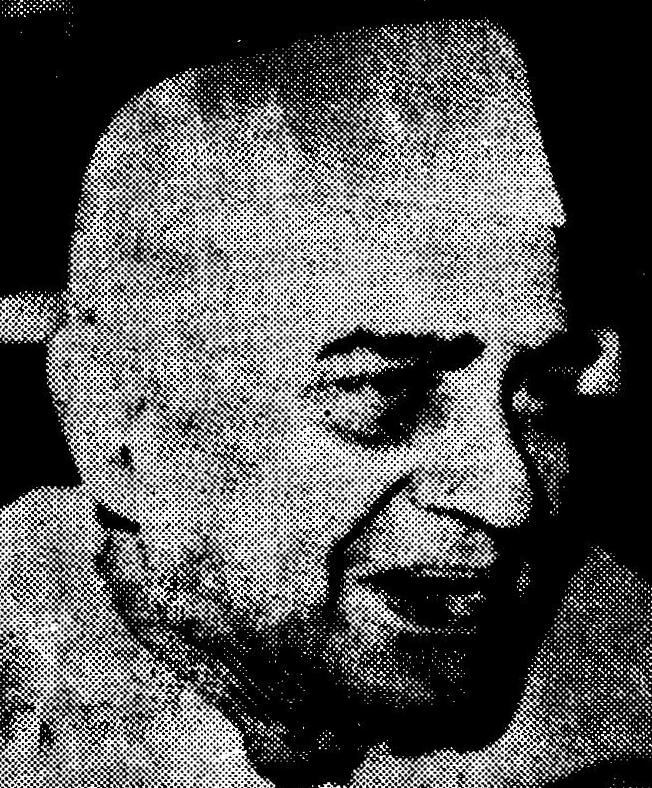

Member of Parliament, Lok Sabha
- In office 1963–1967
- Preceded by: Pundalik Gaitonde
- Succeeded by: Janardan Jagannath Shinkre
- Constituency: Panjim

Personal details
- Born: 31 March 1908
- Died: 6 May 1975 (aged 67)

Peter Augustus Alvares (1908–1975) was an Indian politician. He was the second and first elected Member of Parliament from North Goa Lok Sabha constituency (then Panjim), after Indian annexation of Goa from Portuguese rule in 1962. He served as president of All India Railwaymen's Federation from 1968 to 1973 and was its general secretary from 1957 to 1968.

== Early life ==
Peter Augustus Alvares was born on 31 March 1908 in Parra, Bardez, Goa, to Augustus John Vincent Alvares. He began his career working for the Port Trust of India but resigned from his position to join the Indian independence movement. In 1942, he participated in the Quit India Movement, for which he was arrested and sentenced to two years of imprisonment.

== Goan independence movement ==
Alvares encouraged many volunteers in Bombay to work in hiding from Goa for its independence.

From 1953 onwards, Alvares was the president of the National Congress (Goa) (NCG). He was later a member of the Praja Socialist Party.

Between 1953 and 1955, he served as the Vice-President of the National Congress (Goa). He later led the Goa Vimochan Sahayak Samiti, an organization dedicated to coordinating aid for the Goan independence movement.

On 26 January 1955, he led a group of Satyagrahis into Goa through Castle Rock. Later that year, on 15 August 1955, he helped organise the satyagraha on 15 August 1954, assembling three groups of about 15 satygrahis each who marched to three different parts on the border of Goa. Due to these activities, the Portuguese authorities filed a chargesheet against him, and he was sentenced in absentia to 18 years of imprisonment.

In June 1957, Alvares was part of a delegation of 11 Goans chosen for consultation by then Prime Minister of India, Jawaharlal Nehru. Others included Armando Menezes and his brother Nicolau Menezes, along with Luis Gracias, J. N. Heredia, Evágrio Jorge, Vishwanath Lawande, Gerald Pereira, Rama Hegde, Pundalik Gaitonde and Purushottam Kakodkar.

== Trade unionism ==
Alvares was a leader in the Indian labour movement, particularly within the railway sector. He was a founding member of the Great Indian Peninsular (GIP) Railway Union and other railway unions. In 1956, at a convention in Nagpur, he was appointed as the Assistant General Secretary of the All India Railwaymen's Federation (AIRF), later rising to the position of President of the organization.

== Political career ==
A staunch socialist, Alvares was deeply influenced by the socialist publication Janata. In 1949, he was elected to the Mumbai Legislative Assembly as a representative of the trade unions. He was also a member of the Congress Socialist Party.

In the 1963 election for the Lok Sabha, Alvares represented the Praja Socialist Party and was supported by the Maharashtrawadi Gomantak Party (MGP) and Bhausaheb Bandodkar, the first Chief Minister of Goa. He won with 53% of the votes. He thus became the first elected Member of Parliament to represent the North Goa Lok Sabha constituency (since his predecessor Pundalik Gaitonde was recommended without any election).

In the 1967 election, Bandodkar and the MGP withdrew their support. Alvares contested on the PSP ticket but lost, pushed down to the sixth position with only 4% of the votes.

== Other movements ==
Alvares was also an active participant in the Samyukta Maharashtra Samiti, which advocated for a separate Marathi-speaking state, and was arrested during the agitation.

In his later years, he was inspired by Jayaprakash Narayan and participated in the "Janata" movement in Bihar.

== Death ==
Alvares died on 6 May 1975.

== Awards and accolades ==
The Government of Goa, Daman and Diu honoured him on 19 June 1984 after his death.
