= Purushottam Kakodkar =

Indian politician and social worker (1913–1998)

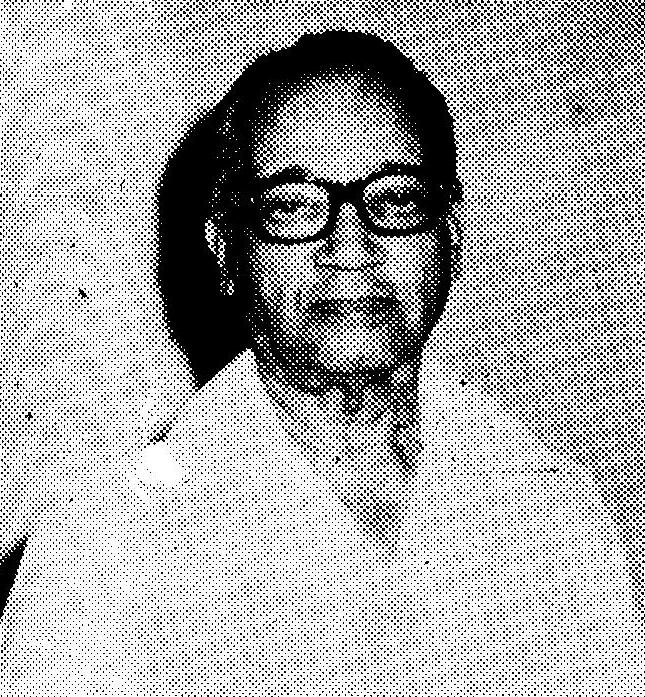

Member of Parliament, Lok Sabha
- In office 1971–1977
- Preceded by: Janardan Shinkre
- Succeeded by: Amrut Shivram Kansar
- Constituency: North Goa

Personal details
- Born: Purushottam Kesava Kakodkar; 18 May 1913 Curchorem, Goa, Portuguese India
- Died: 2 May 1998 (aged 84) Delhi, India
- Children: Anil Kakodkar

Purushottam Kesava Kakodkar (18 May 1913 – 2 May 1998) was an Indian politician and social worker. He served as a Member of Parliament in both the Lok Sabha and Rajya Sabha.

== Role as a freedom fighter ==
He took part in the Quit India Movement and was imprisoned for it. He also took part in the Goa Liberation Movement and the Civil Disobedience Movement launched by Ram Manohar Lohia in Goa in 1946. The Portuguese colonial administration deported him and kept him in detention.

After being released from detention in Portugal in 1956, Kakodkar came back to India. After spending some time with his family in Mumbai, he came to Goa and set up an ashram in Margao. The ashram was used to disguise the freedom movement and many freedom fighters took refuge in the ashram. The police soon discovered the true purpose of the ashram and closed it. He was among the vocal critics of the Salazar administration in Goa. In 1961, he pursued autonomy for Portuguese India but without success.

In June 1957, he was part of a delegation of 11 Goans chosen for consultation by then Prime Minister of India, Jawaharlal Nehru. Others included Armando Menezes and his brother Nicolau Menezes, along with Luis Gracias, J. N. Heredia, Pundalik Gaitonde, Rama Hegde, Peter Alvares, Evágrio Jorge, Vishwanath Lawande and Gerald Pereira.

After Goa's liberation Kakodkar was the head of the Goa unit of the Congress, which was set up in Panjim from the residence of his close confidant and advisor Advocate Rui Gomes Pereira. Gomes Pereira was considered to be Goa's foremost legal counsel and an astute politician.

== Contribution to the Goa Opinion Poll ==
When the issue of Goa's merger with Maharashtra came up, Kakodkar was the chairperson of the Goa Pradesh Congress committee. He used his personal equations with the Nehru family to lobby hard for a referendum with the central leadership. According to one source, he reportedly "almost lost his sanity" trying to do so against the mighty Maharastra.

== Political career ==
He served as Member of Parliament in the Lok Sabha (lower house), representing Panaji constituency in the former union territory of Goa, Daman and Diu from 1971 to 1977. He was a nominated member of the Rajya Sabha from 1985 to 1991. During this term he was also a member of Committee on Petitions, Rajya Sabha during 1986-87.

== Criticism ==
In his book Panthast, Goan writer Ravindra Kelekar blamed the failure of the non-violent Goa Freedom Movement, spearheaded by Lohia on the squabbles and ego-clashes between Kakodkar and Rama Hegde.

Kelekar also stated that Kakodkar was once responsible for Mahatma Gandhi having to apologise to the Portuguese. While he was logged in Aguada jail, Kakodkar had begun a fast against the harassment meted out by the Portuguese authority to the freedom fighters. Gandhiji had made a note of this in his paper Harijan. The Portuguese replied that Kakodkar was not fasting. Gandhiji is supposed to have sent a man, who was a relative of Kakodkar, to verify this. His relative verified that although Kakodkar was not taking any food from the jail, he was getting food from outside. A shocked Gandhi tendered an apology to the Portuguese through the Harijan.

== Other activities ==
Kakodkar was the president of the Goa Konkani Akademi from 1984-1996.

== Death ==
Kakodkar died on 2 May 1998 in Delhi at the age of 85.

== Family ==
His son Anil Kakodkar is former chairman of the Atomic Energy Commission of India.
