= Goan independence movement =

Movement to end Portuguese rule in Goa

The Goan independence movement was a movement which fought to end Portuguese colonial rule in Goa, Portuguese India. The movement built on the small scale revolts and uprisings of the 19th century, and grew powerful during the period 1940–1961. The movement was conducted both inside and outside Goa, and was characterised by a range of tactics including nonviolent demonstrations, revolutionary methods and diplomatic efforts. However, Portuguese control of its Indian colonies ended only when India invaded and annexed Goa in 1961. This caused a mixture of worldwide acclaim and condemnation.

== Portuguese possessions in India ==
The Portuguese colonised India in 1510, conquering many parts of the western coast and establishing several colonies in the east. By the end of the 19th century, Portuguese colonies in India were limited to Goa, Daman, Diu, Dadra, Nagar Haveli and Anjediva Island.

== Revolts against Portuguese rule ==
Some Goans (e.g. Pinto Revolt) resented Portuguese rule and wanted to lead Goa themselves. There were 14 local revolts against Portuguese rule (the final attempt in 1912), but none of these uprisings was successful. The failure of these uprisings was due to the lack of interest from the majority of Goans, who were comfortable with Portuguese rule and were not interested in change, especially since the Goa Inquisition had been abolished. In addition to that Goans were considered equal citizens under the laws of Portugal even if not completely in practice. The other option for them would have been British rule as part of British India, as stated by Francisco Luís Gomes an empire known to treat its subjects who did not have citizenship rights far worse.

== The independence movement ==
=== 18th century ===
An early attempt to overthrow Portuguese rule was the Pinto Revolt in 1787. The cause of the revolt was racial discrimination by the Portuguese in the church and the administration. The Goan subjects were not given equal rights as their Portuguese counterparts. The conspirators unsuccessfully tried to replace Portuguese rule with self-rule under Ignacio Pinto, the head of the family of the Pintos with the support of Tipu Sultan.

=== Early 20th century ===
The abolition of the Portuguese monarchy in 1910 raised hopes that the colonies would be granted self-determination; however, when Portuguese colonial policies remained unchanged, an organised and dedicated anti-colonial movement emerged. Luís de Menezes Bragança founded O Heraldo, the first Portuguese language newspaper in Goa, which was critical of Portuguese colonial rule. In 1917, the "Carta Organica" law was passed, overseeing all civil liberties in Goa.

In reaction to growing dissent, the Portuguese government in Goa implemented policies which curtailed civil liberties, including censorship of the press. Strict censorship policies required any material containing printed words, including invitation cards, to be submitted to a censorship committee for screening. The Portuguese governor of Goa was empowered to suspend publication, close down printing presses and impose heavy fines on newspapers which refused to comply with these policies. Many Goans criticised the curtailing of press freedoms, stating that the only newspapers and periodicals the Portuguese permitted them to publish were pro-colonialist propaganda materials.

Menezes Bragança organised a rally in Margao denouncing the law and, for some time, the Goans received the same rights as mainland Portuguese. However, the Portuguese Catholic Church strongly supported pro-colonial policies and attempted to influence Goan Christians to oppose the independence movement. The Portuguese Patriarch of the Catholic Church in Goa issued over 60 official letters to the priests of the archdiocese, instructing them to preach to their congregations that salvation lay with the Portuguese and in dissociating themselves from cultural-political relationship with the rest of India.

=== 1920–1940 ===
In 1928, Tristão de Bragança Cunha founded the Goa National Congress. At the Calcutta session of the Indian National Congress, the Goa Congress Committee received recognition and representation in the All-India Congress Committee.

In May 1930, Portugal passed the "Acto Colonial" (Colonial Act), which restricted political rallies and meetings within all Portuguese colonies. The introduction of this act politically relegated Goa to the status of a colony. The Portuguese also introduced a policy of compulsory conscription in Portuguese India, which contributed significantly to growing resentment against the colonial government.

The Portuguese government pressured the Indian National Congress to disaffiliate the National Congress (Goa); however, in 1938, Goans in Bombay city formed the Provisional Goa Congress.

=== 1940s ===
By the 1940s, the Goan independence movement had gained momentum, inspired by the Indian independence movement, which had entered a crucial phase following the 1946 announcement by the British government to grant India independence. After this development, Indian leaders focused their attention on the movements in Portuguese India and French India that sought to join the newly independent Indian state.

Ram Manohar Lohia emerged as an important leader of the freedom movement. Along with activist Juliao Menezes, he hosted a pro-independence gathering in Margao in 1946 where the crowd responded by hailing India, Gandhi and the two men, leading to the duo's arrest by colonial authorities who feared civil unrest. By the end of the day, Menezes was released and Lohia was driven outside of Goa and released. Their arrest at the demonstration motivated people to hold large-scale protests in support of the independence movement, which resulted in large-scale arrests and the incarceration of over 1,500 people. Other leaders, including Bragança Cunha, Purushottam Kakodkar and Laxmikant Bhembre were deported to Portugal because of their participation in the independence protests. This day is now known as Goa Revolution Day.

During October and November 1946, a series of satyagrahas (non-violent civil-disobedience actions) were held in Goa with many of the leaders of these actions being arrested. With the arrest of the leadership, much of the momentum of the movement was lost and, subsequently, the Goa Congress began to operate from Bombay. This resulted in the Satyagraha movement in Goa.

During the mid-1940s, a number of new political parties emerged in Goa, each having a conflicting agenda and perspective in relation to achieving Goan independence and autonomy. These political parties advocated for vastly different policies including Goa's merger with Maharashtra state, Goa's merger with the southern Indian state of Karnataka, independent statehood for Goa and autonomy within Portuguese rule.

Mahatma Gandhi sensed that an independence movement with such disparate perspectives would be ineffective and could undermine the struggle for independence. So Gandhi suggested that the various independence factions should attempt to unite under the common objective of achieving civil liberties. In response to Gandhi's suggestion, the different Goan political factions met in Bombay in June 1947 to formally launch a campaign demanding that the Portuguese government "quit India". The Goan leadership believed that with the end of British colonial rule in India, an end to Portuguese colonial rule would logically follow. However, on 3 August 1947, Lohia announced that Goa's independence would not coincide with Indian independence and that the Goans would have to continue their struggle, "not just for civil liberties, but for freedom itself".

The failure of Goa to achieve independence as part of the national independence struggle, in conjunction with mixed signals from the new national Indian leadership in New Delhi and harsh repression by the Portuguese, led to a temporary lull in the Goan independence movement. Similarly, the partition of India and the Indo-Pakistani War of 1947 diverted the focus of the national Indian leadership from the anti-colonial struggles in the Portuguese and French colonies.

Following national Indian independence, a separate demand for independence was raised by Froilano de Mello, a prominent Goan microbiologist and MP in the Portuguese National Assembly. De Mello sought independence for Goa, Daman and Diu as autonomous state entities within the framework of a Portuguese commonwealth, similar to the British Commonwealth.

=== Demand for autonomy ===
Within Goa and Portugal, periodic demands for autonomy for Portuguese India continued. In July 1946, a public meeting was held which openly petitioned the Salazar administration to grant autonomy to the Estado da India. The meeting was facilitated by José Inácio de Loyola, and inspired the formation of a committee chaired by Uday Bhembre to pursue autonomy. Bhembre's committee failed to provoke a response from the Portuguese administration, and subsequently the last demand for autonomy was made by Purushottam Kakodkar in early 1961.

=== Diplomatic efforts ===
In December 1947, independent India and Portugal established diplomatic ties. In January 1948, Indian Prime Minister Jawaharlal Nehru met the Portuguese consul and raised the issue of Goa's integration into the Indian Union. The Portuguese, who valued their strategic Indian colonial outposts, were unwilling to negotiate and by 1948, the Goan anti-colonial movement had virtually disbanded.

In January 1953, the Indian delegation in Portugal (a representative body of the Indian government), sought to negotiate with Portugal on the issue of its territories in India. The Indian government offered a direct transfer; however, the Portuguese refused and diplomatic relations between the two countries deteriorated. On 11 June 1953, the Indian delegation in Lisbon was closed and diplomatic ties were formally severed. In July 1953, Nehru stated that the Indian government's position involved French and Portuguese colonies in India integrating into the Indian Union. Despite Nehru clearly stating India's policy in relation to colonial outposts, Portugal and France refused to cede their colonies. Subsequently, India launched a campaign through the UN in an attempt to persuade the Portuguese to leave India peacefully.

=== Revolutionary groups ===
- Azad Gomantak Dal, a revolutionary group, vowed to fight the Portuguese using direct action strategies.
- Goa Liberation Army, founded by Shivajirao Desai, an Indian army officer in the 1950s, attempted to utilise revolutionary tactics and direct action strategies to challenge Portuguese colonialism.
- Quit Goa Organisation

=== 1953 onwards: intensification of Satyagraha movement ===
In 1953, Tristão de Bragança Cunha formed the Goa Action Committee to coordinate the various anti-colonial groups working independently in Mumbai. Goans and non-Goans offered Satyagraha in solidarity with the struggle.

In Goa, the anti-colonial movement had evolved into two camps, which advocated distinct anti-colonial strategies. The National Congress Goa utilised peaceful satyagraha tactics, while Azad Gomantak Dal advocated revolutionary methods. On 15 August 1954, a mass satyagraha was instigated; however, despite the use of non-violent civil disobedience protest strategies, the Portuguese authorities assaulted and arrested many participants. P.D. Gaitonde was arrested for publicly protesting Portuguese colonialist policy.

A year later, another protest was organised on the same date. The Jana Sangh leader, Karnataka Kesari Jagannathrao Joshi, led 3,000 protesters including women, children and Indians from Maharashtra state, through the Goa border. The security forces baton charged the protesters and opened fire on the satyagraha, resulting in several deaths and hundreds of injuries.

As Portugal was now a member of NATO, the Indian government was reticent to react to the situation. NATO member nations had a pact to protect each other in the event that any member state came under attack from an external force. Although the NATO treaty did not cover colonies, Portugal insisted that its overseas interests were not colonies but an integral part of the Nation of Portugal. Hence, in order for India to avoid NATO involvement in Goa, the Indian government was impeded from speaking out against Portugal's response to satyagraha protest actions.

In 1954, the Goa Vimochan Sahayak Samiti (All-Party Goa Liberation Committee), was formed with the aim of continuing the civil disobedience campaign and providing financial and political assistance to the satyagrahis. The Maharashtra and Gujarat chapters of the Praja Socialist Party assisted the liberation committee, motivated by an agenda for independent Goa to merge into Maharashtra state. The liberation committee and the Praja Socialist Party collaboratively organised several satyagrahas in 1954–55.

The Communist Party of India decided to send batches of satyahrahis since the middle of 1955 to the borders of Goa and even inside. Countrywide lists of satyagrahis were prepared, who were then sent to Goa borders in a series of memorable satyagrahas, which has few parallels in the annuls of the history. Batches after batches defied the Portuguese police and military, entered the borders of Goa, raised Indian Tricolour, and were fired upon and lathi-charged brutally. Many were killed, many more others arrested and sent to jails inside Goa and inhumanly treated. Many others were even sent to jails in Portugal and were brutally tortured.

The Portuguese government appealed to various international powers, charging India with violation of Portugal's territorial sovereignty due to the actions of the Satyagrahas in crossing Portuguese Goan borders. Nehru was subsequently pressured to announce that India formally disapproved of the Satyagrahas.

Nehru's denouncement of the Satyagraha severely impacted on the independence movement. Following Nehru's professed lack of support for the satyagrahi, a satyagrahi plan to cross the Goan border at Terekhol Fort attracted very few supporters. Despite the low turnout, a small group managed to cross the Goan border to successfully occupy the Terekhol fort overnight.

With the exception of a small number of satyagrahas and the activities of the All-Goa Political Party Committee, lacking the support of the national Indian government, the anti-colonial movement lost its momentum. Pro-independence advocacy actions were sporadic and few were willing to involve themselves in the movement. On 18 June 1954, Satyagrahis infiltrated Goa and hoisted the Indian flag; however, the demonstrators and suspected sympathisers were arrested, and anti-colonialist activists Dr. Gaitonde and Shriyut Deshpande were deported to Portugal.

=== Indian Annexation of Dadra and Nagar Haveli ===
On 21 July 1954, the revolutionaries forced the Portuguese to retreat from Dadra, a small landlocked territory bordering Nagar Haveli under leaders like Francis Mascarenhas, Narayan Palekar, Parulekar, Vaz, Rodriguez, Cunha.

A group of armed members from the National Movement Liberation Organisation (NMLO), an umbrella organisation involving Nationalist group like the Rashtriya Swayamsevak Sangh and Azad Gomantak Dal, led an attack on Nagar Haveli on 28 July 1954, and took it on 2 August. India could not immediately assimilate these enclaves into the Indian Union, due to the contravention of international law involved. Both enclaves instead functioned as de facto independent states, administered by a self-declared government called the Varishta Panchayat of Free Dadra and Nagar Haveli.

On 15 August 1954, hundreds of Indians (mostly from Maharashtra) crossed the Portuguese Goan borders, defying a ban by the Indian government on participating in Satyagrahas. The Portuguese responded to the incursion by shooting at the Satyagrahis, some of whom were injured or killed.

The Portuguese responded to the Satyagrahas, which continued throughout 1955, by sealing Goa's borders in an attempt to curb the growing illegal immigration from India. By 1955, the Indian government had developed a clear policy on Portuguese Goan territory, which supported merger of Goa with India. Between 1955 and 1961, six political parties were formed in India to advocate for an end to Portuguese colonial rule. These parties included Azad Gomantak Dal, Rancour Patriota, the United Front of Goans, Goan People's Party, Goa Liberation Army and Quit Goa Organisation.

Many Goan Hindus were bitter and resentful that the majority of native Goans were Catholic, because Portugal had ruled Goa since 1510. This bitterness was compounded by Goan Catholics being, on average, more educated and hence more economically prosperous than Goan Hindus. According to the 1909 statistics in the Catholic Encyclopedia, the total Catholic population was 293,628 out of a total population 365,291 (80.33%). Following his release from prison, Pundalik Gaitonde conducted a series of international lectures, claiming Hindu dominance of Goa. Anant Priolkar also wrote many articles and books, claiming that Konkani language was a dialect of Marathi and so Goa needed to be merged with Maharashtra. These propaganda campaigns enabled the Indian government to become more anti-Portuguese.

During this period, in addition to local newspapers and periodicals that were heavily censored, there was also movements such as the underground radio station Voice of freedom (Portuguese: Voz da Liberdade; Konkani: Goenche Sadvonecho Awaz) that carried messages about the independence movement. These were broadcast from outside Goa's borders and often from neighboring states like the present day Maharashtra and Karnataka.

In 1961, India proclaimed that Goa should join India "either with full peace or with full use of force". In August 1961, India began military preparations. Following Nehru's statement on 1 December 1961, that India would "not remain silent" in relation to the Goan situation, Indian troops were stationed close to the Goan border.

== Annexation of Goa ==
After the failure of diplomacy with the Portuguese government, the Government of India ordered the Indian Armed Forces to take Goa by force. In a military operation conducted on 18 and 19 December 1961, Indian troops captured Goa. The Governor-general of Portuguese India, Manuel António Vassalo e Silva, signed an instrument of surrender.

== Subsequent events ==
Major General Kunhiraman Palat Candeth was appointed military governor of Goa. In 1963, the Parliament of India passed the 12th Amendment Act to the Constitution of India, formally integrating the captured territories into India. Goa, Daman and Diu became a Union territory. Dadra and Nagar Haveli, which was previously a part of the Estado da India, but independent between 1954 and 1961, became a separate Union Territory.

In October 1962, Panchayat elections were held in Goa, followed by assembly elections in December 1962. On 16 January 1967, a referendum was held in which the people of Goa voted against merger with Maharashtra. Portugal recognised Goa's accession into the Indian union only in 1974. In 1987, Goa was separated from Daman and Diu and made a full-fledged state. Daman and Diu continued as a new Union Territory.

== Films ==
Saat Hindustani (translation: Seven Indians) is a 1969 film written and directed by Khwaja Ahmad Abbas. The film portrays the story of seven Indians who attempt to unite Goa with the rest of India.

"Pukar" (translation : "The Call") is another film based on Goan Freedom Movement. It was directed by Ramesh Behl in 1983, acted by superstar Amitabh Bachchan.

== See also ==
- History of Goa
- Portuguese India
- Indian annexation of Goa

== Gallery ==
Some of Goa's independence activists, as seen in Goa State Museum

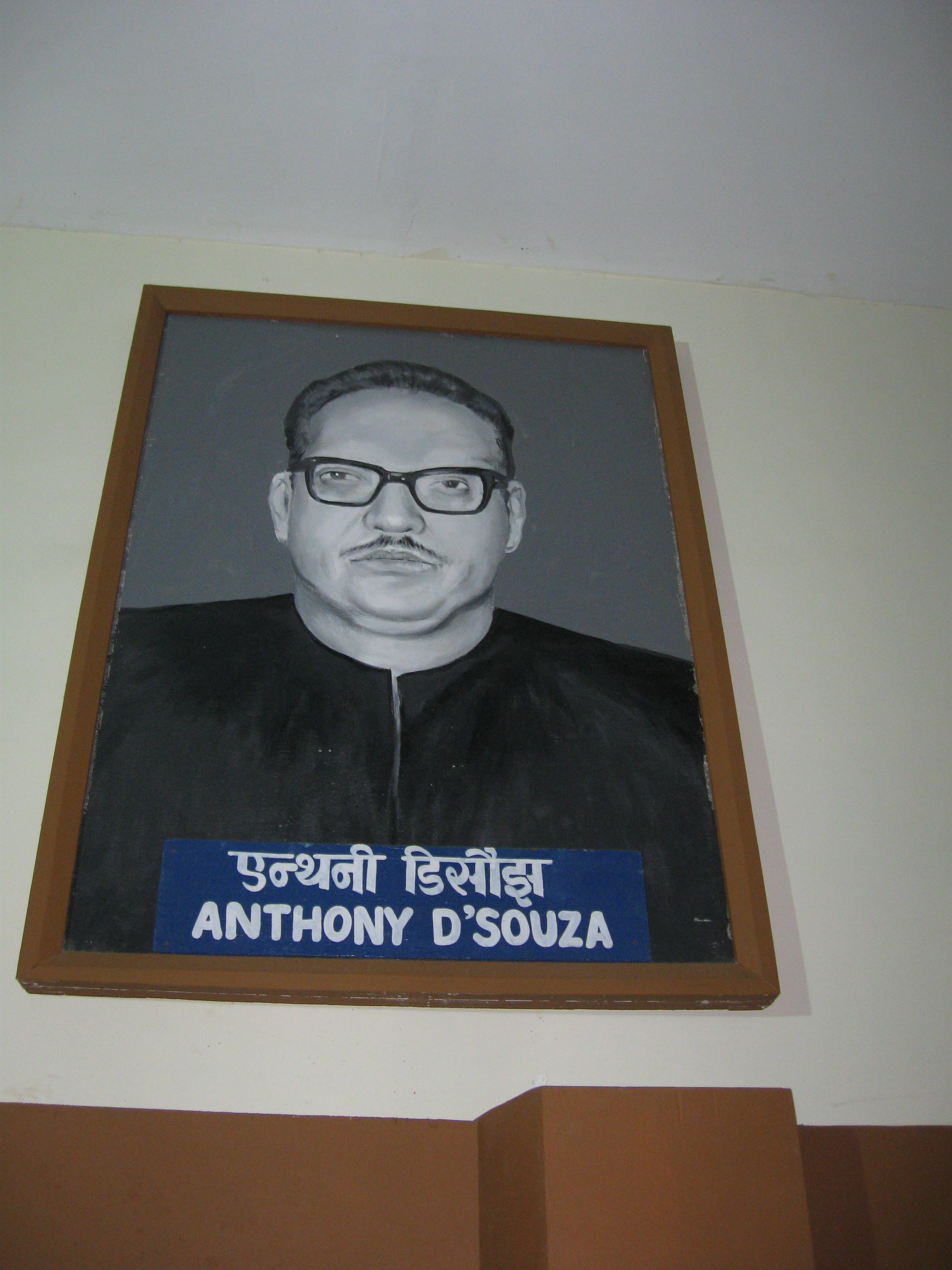
Anthony D'Souza

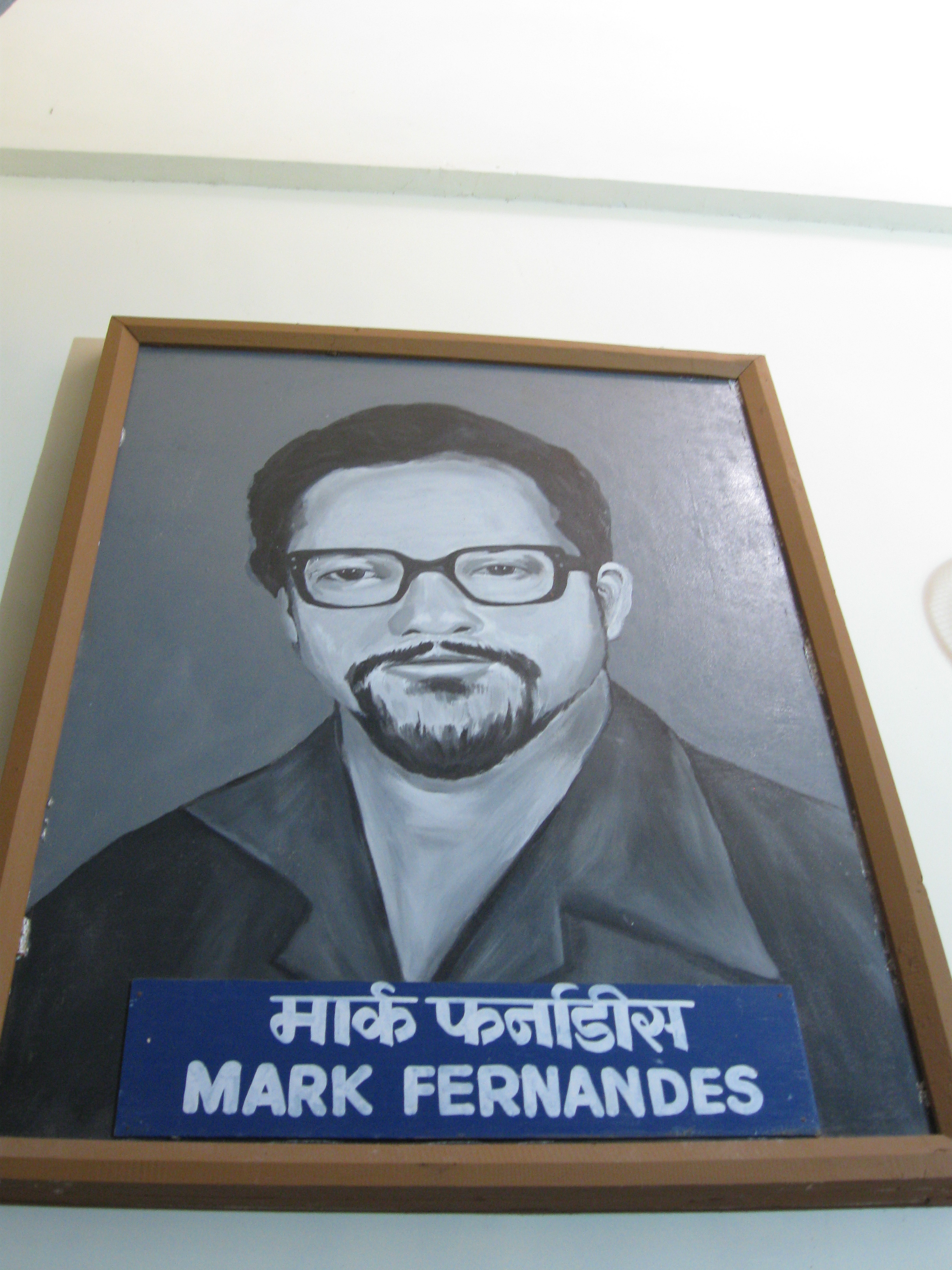
Mark Fernandes

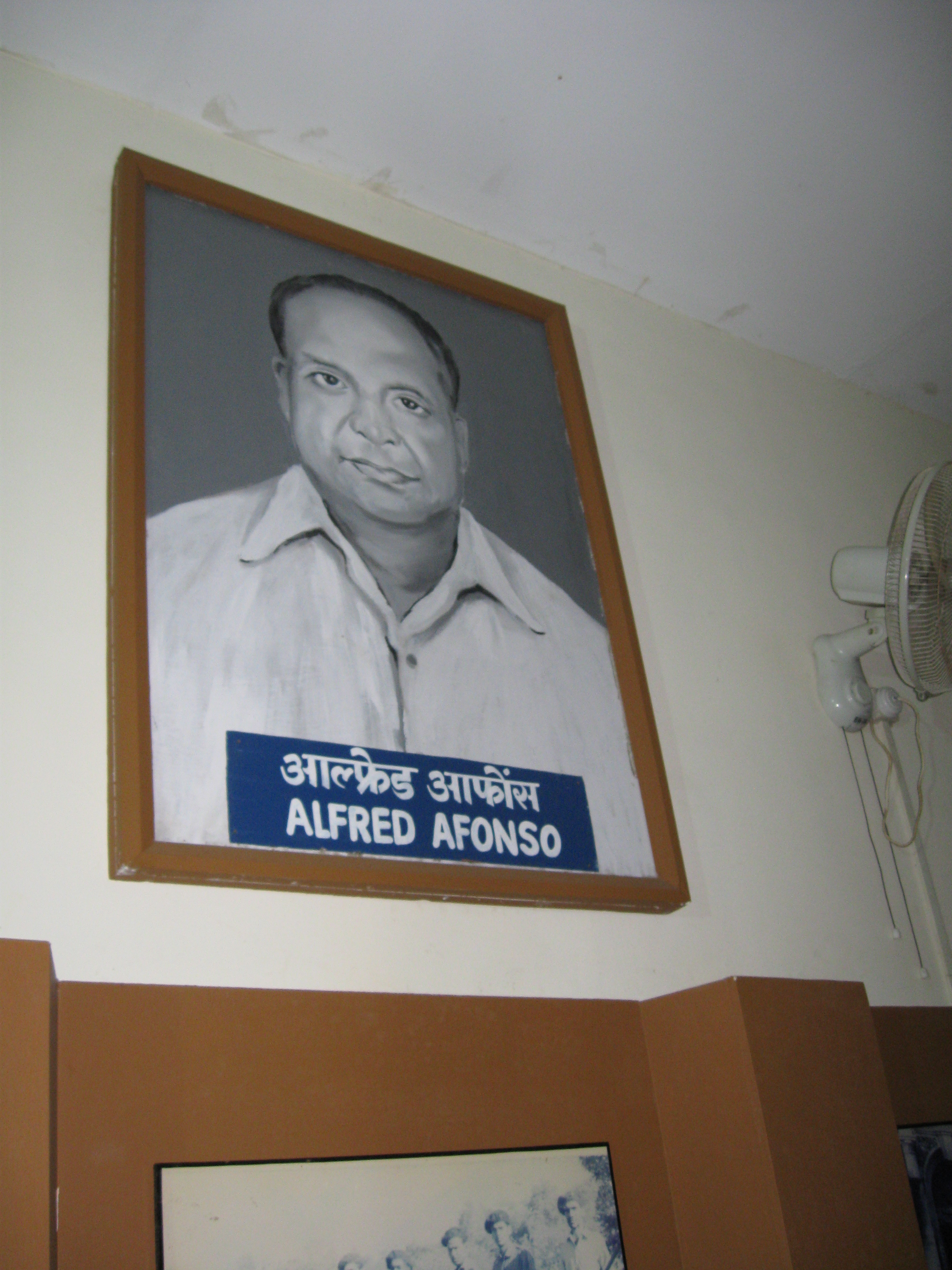
Alfred Afonso

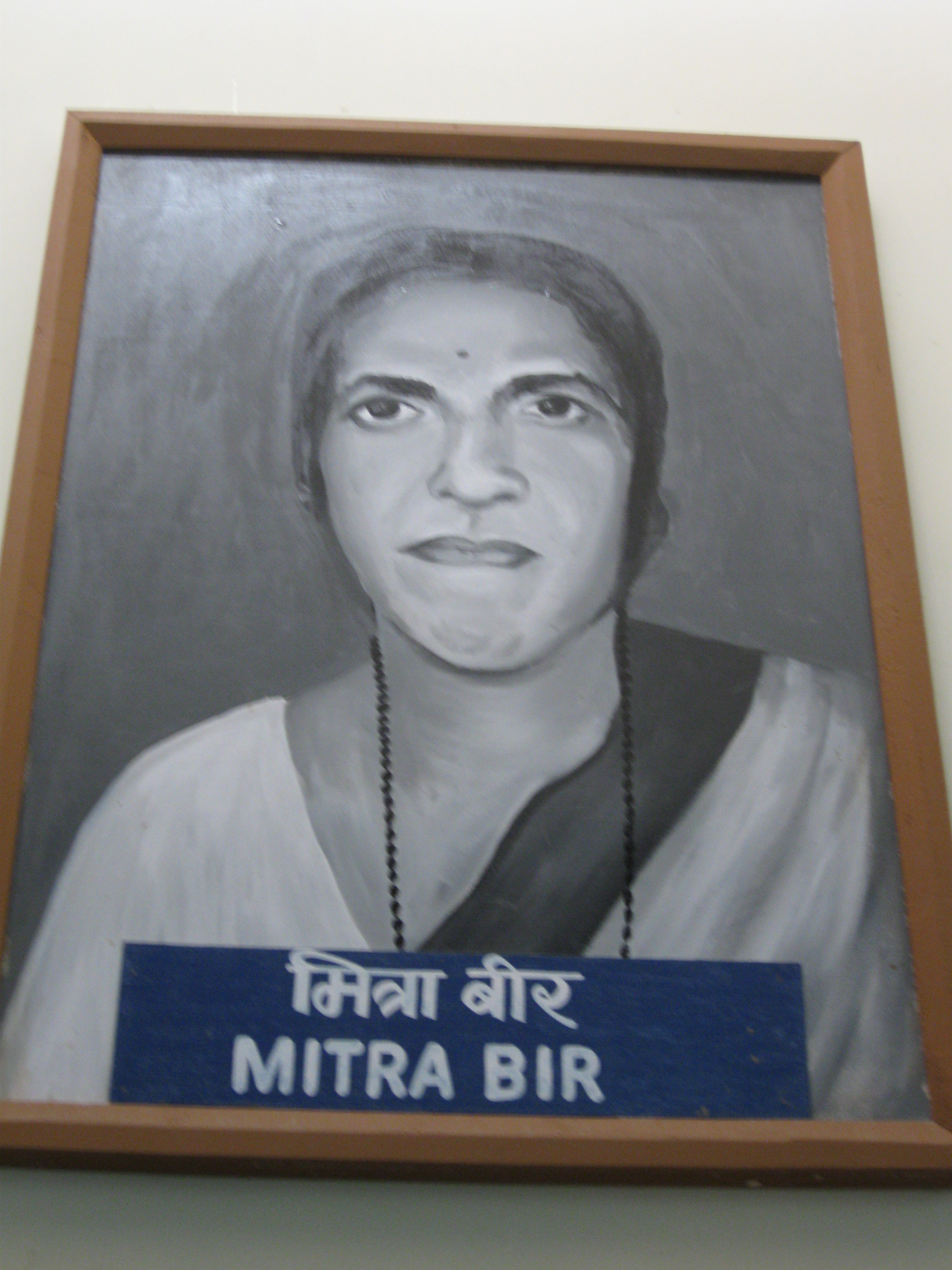
Mitra Bir
