= Media in Goa =

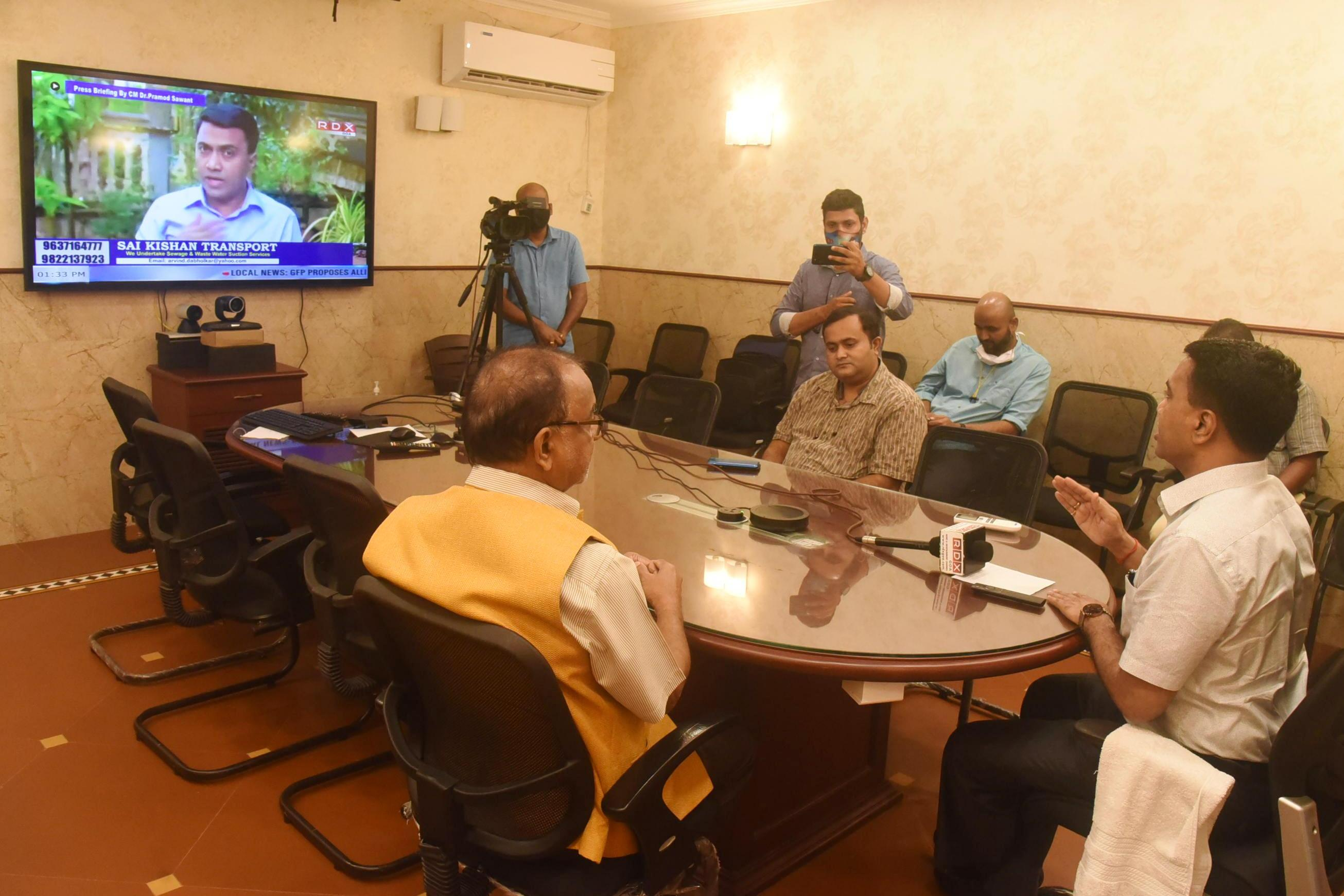
Chief Minister Pramod Sawant launches an app for the RDXGoa local channel in Nov. 2020.

Media in Goa refers to the newspapers, magazines, radio stations, cable and television networks and online media in India's smallest state (3700 square kilometres, population 1.6 million). Over the past two-and-half decades, the Goa-linked online media (both in the diaspora and from the region) has also grown.

== Background ==
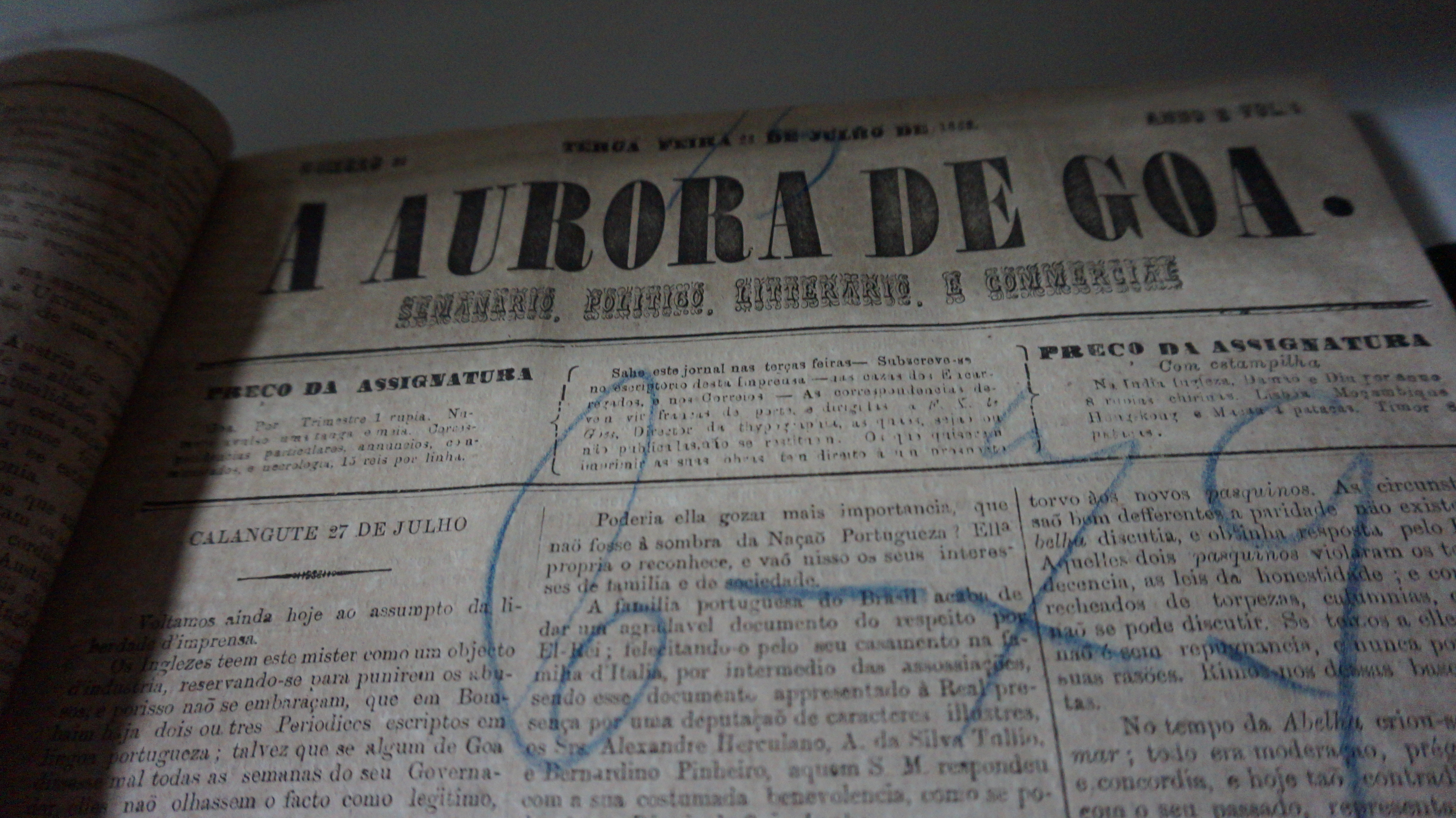
An old Portuguese newspaper A Aurora de Goa stored at the Central Library.

Over the years, the media has changed dramatically from its early 20th century beginnings as a battlefield for influential lobbies within the local Catholic society (including caste-based elites, or politically divided groups) which were largely controlled by influential and educated local elites. Early pioneers of widespread media in Goa were the Rangel family through Tipografia Rangel. After the end of Portuguese rule in 1961, new newspapers were set up, which were aligned to the influential local mining lobby. This too has changed in recent years, with some sections of the media becoming more politically aligned, or linked to major business houses both within Goa and its neighbourhood (particularly Maharastra).

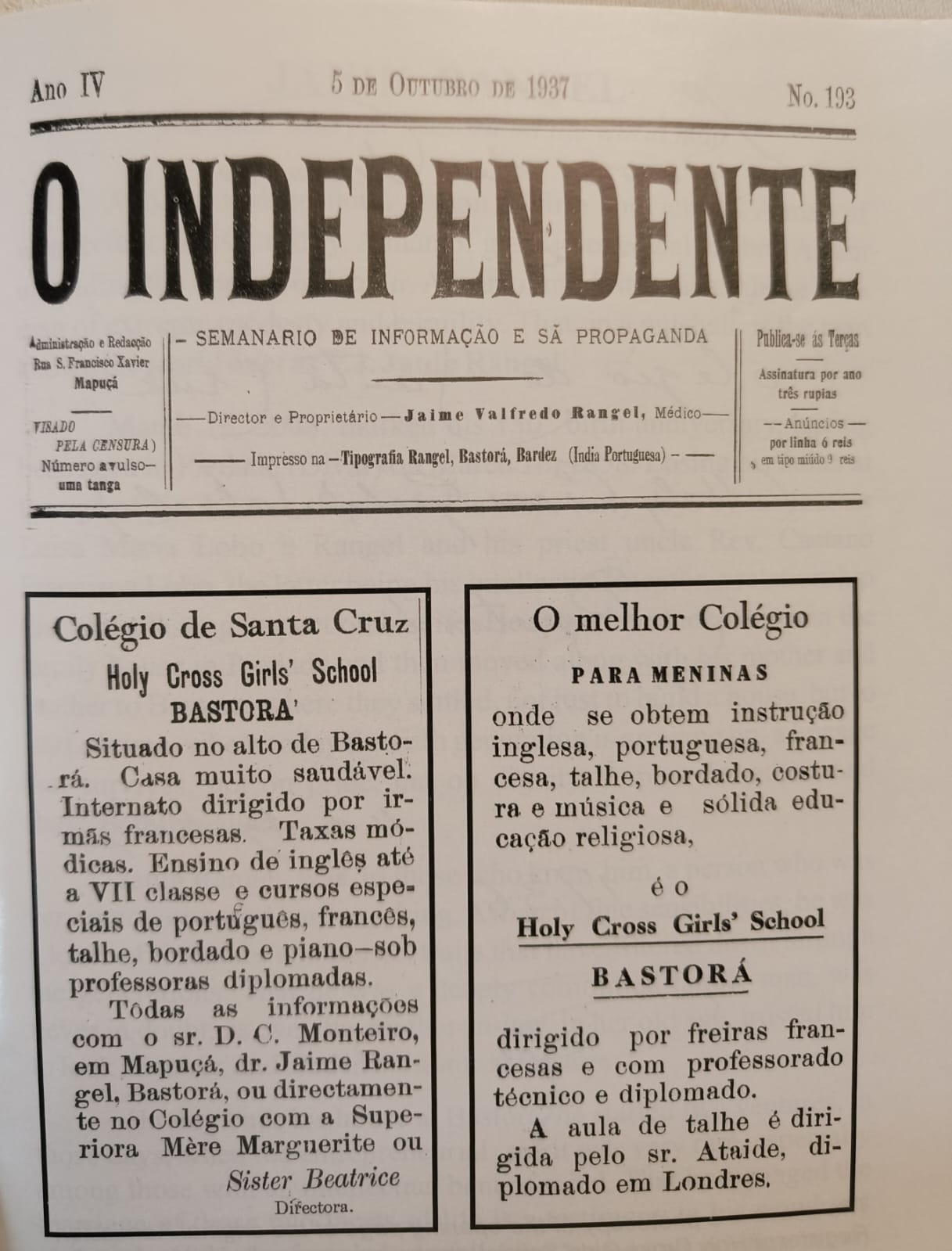
O Independente published by Jaime Valfredo Rangel

== Media in the 1960s ==
Till 1961, and the end of Portuguese-rule in Goa, Portuguese-language newspapers, including dailies and an eveninger, dominated the local market. There was an end to censorship after the demise of the Portuguese regime, but most of the earlier newspapers (except O Heraldo) shut down during the decade. As an official report put it in 1971: "With the integration of the former Portuguese enclaves in the Indian Union, the people of the territory started enjoying the fundamental rights including the freedom of press guaranteed by the [Indian] Constitution."

Around 1961, there were ten newspapers and journals (both daily and of differing periodicity) -- seven in Portuguese, two in Konkani and one in Marathi. However, the situated changed soon. Within the first decade of the change and "their number shot up to 26 in 1965". But, as the official text puts it, "some of them could not obviously sustain the effervescence and the number declined to 19 which are being circulated now [as of 1971]."

== Languages ==
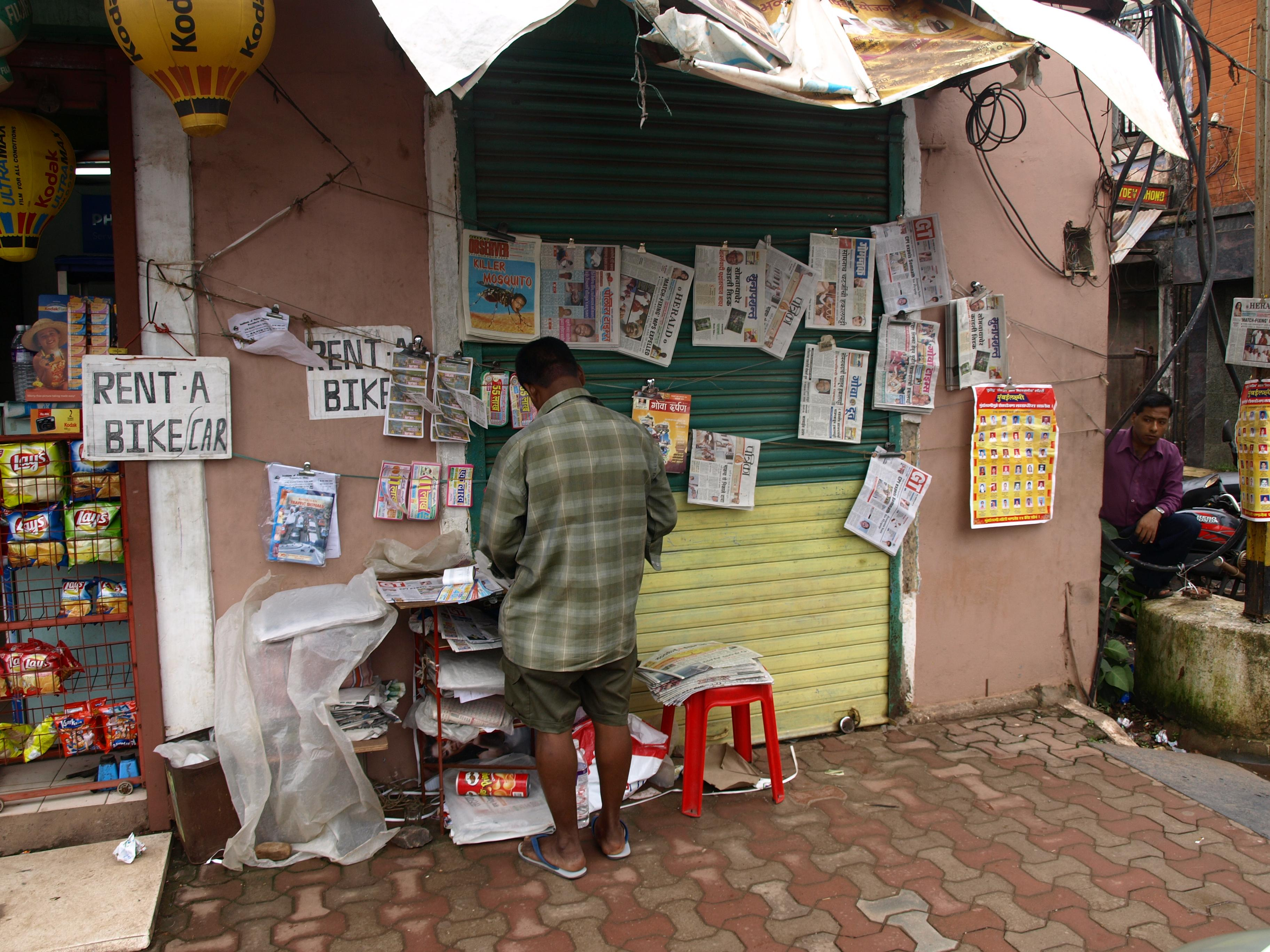
Newspapers and lotteries stall in Goa

The most widely read newspapers in Goa tend to be published in the English and Marathi languages, with the widely spoken local language of Konkani not receiving much coverage. Konkani-versus-Marathi linguistic battles have led to rivalry between these two language camps around the 1980s. There is friction between the users of the official Devanagari script and the Roman, or Romi script users of Konkani.

== Newspapers and magazines ==
English-language newspapers in Goa comprise: O Heraldo (The Herald), Goa's oldest newspaper, formerly a Portuguese language daily owned by the family of Raul Fernandes (Herald Publications Pvt Ltd), a local printing enterprise that grew out of a stationery shop; The Navhind Times, published by the former mining house of the Dempos since 1963; and the Gomantak Times, which changed hands from its earlier owners from the mining house of the Chowgules to the politically linked Pawar family, based in the neighboring state of Maharashtra. In addition to these, The Times of India and The Indian Express are also distributed to urban areas from nearby Bombay and Bangalore. A Goan edition of The Times of India started publication in June 2008.

The lone English monthly is Goa Today, edited by Vinayak Naik and owned by Goa Publications, a firm controlled by the Salgaocars mining house. Other English-language publications include The Goan, Goa Messenger and the Goan Observer.

The First travel magazine of Goa started in Goa in year 2007Goa Prism.

Publications in Konkani include Vauraddeancho Ixtt (Workers' Friend), a weekly magazine in Roman script. In the 1980s, a Roman script Konkani paper called Novem Goem folded in large part due to financial difficulties and alleged mismanagement in spite of being set up with enthusiasm and even a drive to collect funds for it through a 'padyatra' (foot-march) across Goa. Sunaparant was a Devanagari Konkani daily published which functioned from 1987 to 2015. The Goan, which is linked to the industrial house of the Timblos, which has interests in mining and the luxury tourism sector, was started in 2013, edited by Sujay Gupta.

On 15 July 2016, a new Devanagari Konkani daily called "Bhaangar Bhuin" (भांगरभूंय) was launched, under the editorship of Pundalik Naik. The daily is published by Fomento Publications, linked to the mining house of the Timblos. It celebrated its third anniversary in 2019.

In the Marathi language, some of the popular newspapers are: the Tarun Bharat, which was earlier published from the neighbouring city of Belgaum but now has its presses in Porvorim; the Daily Pudhari, which was earlier published from Karaswada, Mapusa; the Gomantak, a sister publication of the Gomantak Times and much more influential in the past; and Navprabha of The Navhind Times/Dempo group. Other publications primarily publish "Goa editions" through presses and offices run from outside Goa. Recent years saw the launch of the Gova Doot. A nearly three-decade old newspaper, the Marathi daily Rashtramath from the South Goa city of Margao suspended publications at the early part of this decade.

A new Hindi daily paper Nitya Samay also started from Margao. As of 2013, the Lokmat, which is a newspaper based in Maharashtra, was also a growing and influential paper in the Marathi segment of the Goa newspaper market; it comes out with a local edition, edited by Raju Nayak. Goan Varta is also Marathi newspaper in Goa.

Goa Samachar, Hindi-language fortnightly newspaper based in Goa, India, was established in the early 2020s by journalist Namita Sharan. It is registered with the Press Registrar General of India and operates in both print and digital formats.

Out-station dailies reaching Goa from other centres of publication include, Kesari, Maharashtra Times, Loksatta, The Asian Age, Deccan Herald, The Hindu, Hindustan Times, Navshakti and more. News agencies operating in the state are the Press Trust of India and the United News of India, while the Indo-Asian News Service and ANI have also offered regular coverage from Goa.

Other publications in the state include Vasco Watch (English-language, fortnightly—Free to reader neighbourhood newspaper), Hello Publications, Hello Travel Talk (English-language, a tourism magazine), Whats On Goa (English-language, fortnightly—an event lister Of Goa), Hello City - Hello Panjim, Hello Margao (English-language), Hello Goa Yellowpages (English-language, Yearly), Gulab (Konkani, monthly), Bimb (Devanagiri-script Konkani), Poddbimb (Konkani Roman-script monthly), Harbour Times, [Digital Goa], and J's House among others. Some of the smaller publications are known to change their name, form or even go out of publication temporarily or permanently.

== Crisis during 2020 pandemic ==
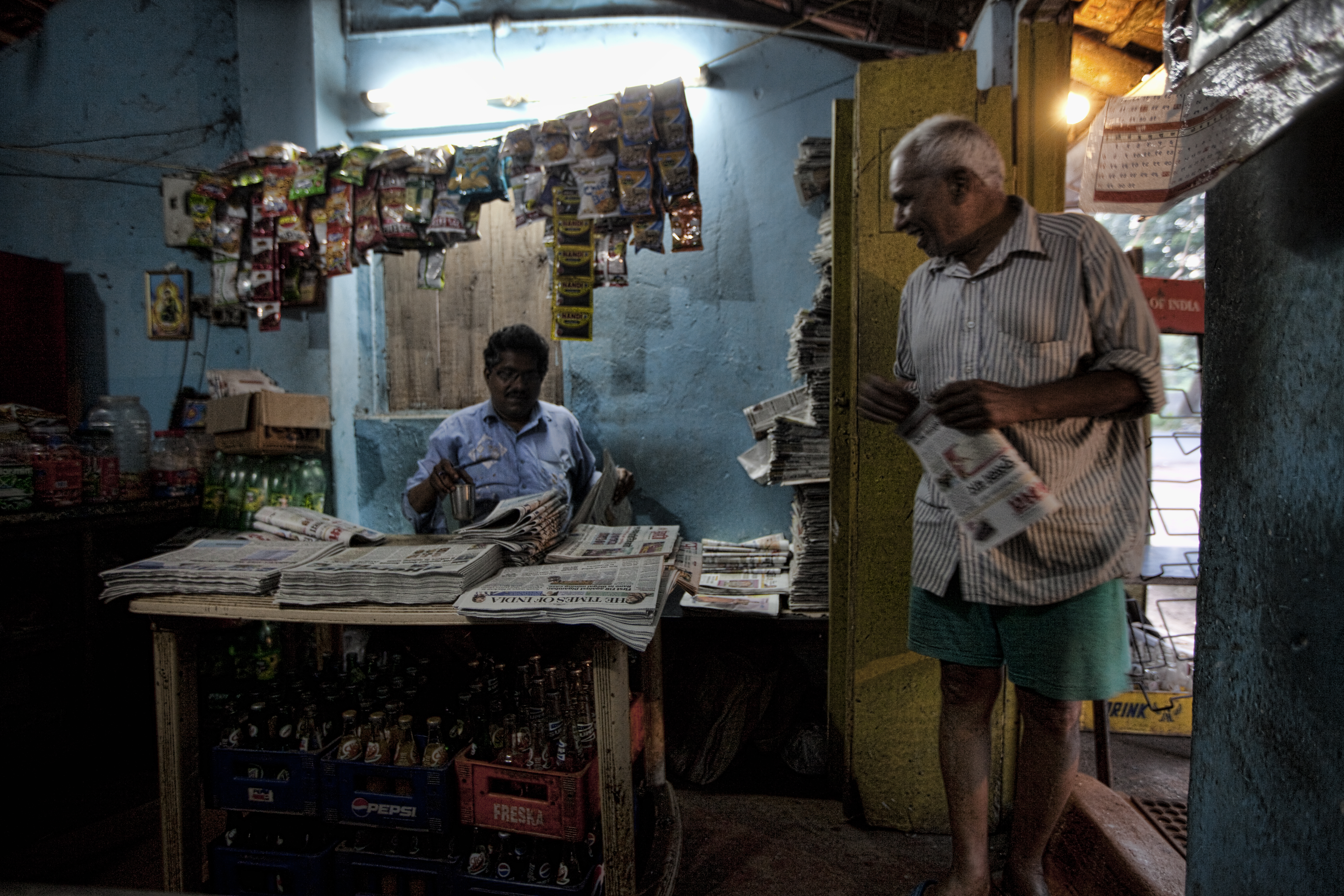
Newspaper stall at Tivim, Goa

Job losses and newspaper shutdowns were reported during the pandemic in mid-2020 and thereabouts, due to the impact of COVID-19 and consequent governmental policies on the media.

About 60 media employees had lost their jobs, and a number of others had to face 15-50 per cent salary cuts. The English-language daily Gomantak Times shut down its operations at the end of May 2020. The Gomantak Times had been started in 1986, as part of the Chowgule mining group, and had then been sold to the Pawar family-linked Sakal Publications of Pune (earlier Poona) in 2000. It had some 13 journalist employees.

Prior to this, the Formento Media (Timblo)-linked Prudent TV channel laid off some 23 of its staff—10 from the Marathi daily Goan Varta, nine from Prudent TV, and two each from the English-language daily The Goan and the Konkani daily Bhangarbhuim.

Lokmat Marathi daily also shut down its three bureaus in Mapusa, Vasco and Ponda. It retrenched some composing, admin, junior reporter and photographer staff. Some staff from the towns outside its centre of publication were asked to work from home. A total of 16 job losses reported from the Nagpur-headquartered Lokmat chain. These included four sub-editors from the Konkan working in Goa, and three correspondents on a retainership in Goa.

Prime TV lost five reporters who were asked to work on a paid-per-story basis. The Goa Union of Journalists was quoted saying that one journalist each had lost their jobs in the Times of India and In Goa TV. In 2020, Goa had an estimated 15 newspapers—nine in Marathi, five in English, one in Konkani—plus five local TV channels.

Fears were raised about potential job losses in other local newspapers. Salary cuts were also reported, including among prominent publications and media houses.

"From the day the 'Janata Curfew' was announced by Prime Minister Narendra Modi on 22nd March [2020], door delivery as well as counter sales of newspapers came to a grinding halt till the second lockdown, which ended on 3rd May [2020]," it was noted.

== Radio ==
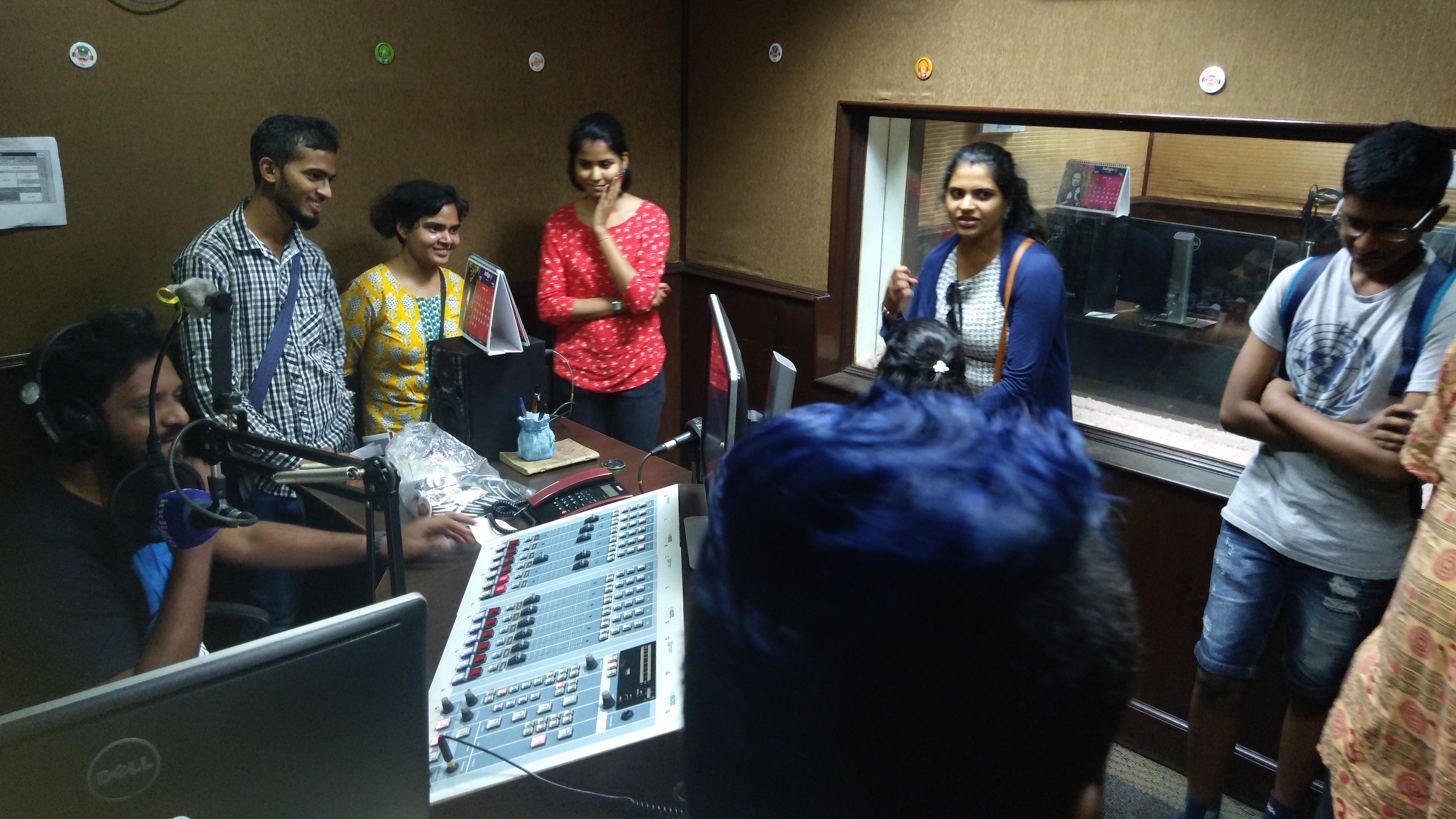
Students visit Radio Indigo, Goa. 2018.

Goa was once home to the Emisora Goa, a radio station that was popular when the region was a Portuguese colony. After the end of Portuguese rule, this station was replaced by a station from the All India Radio network. Its studios are at Altinho, the hill-top state-capital Panjim – also known as Panaji, Pangim or Ponnje – and its transmitters are located at Bambolim, some 5 km away. Bambolim also houses transmitters that broadcast foreign-language programmes as part of India's international programme. Two AM channels are broadcast, the primary channel at 1287 kHz and the Vividh Bharati channel at 1539 kHz.

Besides the AM broadcasts, All India Radio has an FM, or frequency modulated, channel called Rainbow FM, broadcasting at 105.4 MHz. Since 2006, the FM channel broadcasts locally produced programs between 4:30 am and 12 midnight. These locally produced programs include mainly English, Konkani and Hindi music. At other times, the channel relays programs from AIR FM Rainbow India channel, providing variety for listeners. It also covers important speeches and events live. Broadcast starts at 6 am and ends at 12:30 am.

Goa has two private FM channels: Big FM and Radio Indigo. Big FM plays only Hindi musics. The channels' programs are hosted in both English and Konkani. The channels have featured Goan artists, like tiatrist Prince Jacob and musician-singer Remo Fernandes. Radio Indigo programming is contemporary international music and international hit music. The music and hosting is in English. Both radio stations broadcast 24 hours a day.

Though the private FM stations have bought life to the radio industry in Goa, signal strength and coverage remain weak in the southern part of Goa, beyond the Verna plateau. Thus, most of the people in south Goa are unable to get reception in their home.

There is also an educational channel, Gyan Vani, run by IGNOU broadcast from Panaji at 105.6 MHz.

=== Broadcasting background ===
In the mid-1990s, when India first experimented with private FM broadcasts, the small tourist destination of Goa was the fifth place in the country where private broadcasters could secure FM slots. The first four centres were the major metro cities: Delhi, Mumbai, Kolkata and Chennai.

In Phase-II of FM licensing, Goa's capital, Panjim was categorised as a 'D'-class city, i.e. having a population between 100,000 and 300,000. In the end of January 2006, three private FM radio players won bids to set up private FM radio stations in Goa.:

- Radio Mirchi (ENIL - Times group, linked to the Indian media giant Times of India, Rs 17.1 million;
- Indigo (Jupiter Capital – Rajiv Chandrasekhar, linked to the BPL electronics hardware firm), Rs 12.9 million; and
- Big FM (Adlabs - Reliance – Anil Ambani group) Rs 12.1 million.

Big FM at 92.7 MHz and Radio Mirchi at 98.3 MHz both launched in Goa in May 2007. Radio Indigo at 91.9 MHz, the country's first and only 24hr international hit music station launched in June 2007.

Indian policy stipulates that these bids are a One-Time Entry Fee (OTEF), for the license period of 10 years.

India's earlier attempts to privatise its FM channels ran into difficulty, when most private players bid heavily then could not meet their commitments to pay the governments the expected amounts.

In FM Phase-1 (year 2000), the highest bid in Goa was Rs 41.5 million. Under the policy then, this would have escalated – at 15% each year – to Rs. 146 million by the tenth year of operation. The bidder would have ended up paying Rs. 42.6 crores over 10 years, causing the major players to back off. This time, the only local company from Goa to bid for a license was Tarun Bharat Multigraphics, resulting in all of the winning players being based outside of Goa.

All the three winning bidders were to co-site their transmitting infrastructure with All India Radio's tower on the outskirts of Panaji.

AIR's FM Rainbow has a six kW transmitter, and even this is not heard properly in some distant areas of Goa. The private FM operators are allowed only 3 kW transmitters.

Radio Mirchi (of what was the Times FM group, run by one of the biggest newspaper chains in the country) returned to Goa after many years. In the late 1980s and early 1990s, Times FM used to buy air-time on AIR's Panaji FM channel. Radio Mirchi Goa 98.3 was discontinued on 22 May 2017 after its license expired and the company decided not to renew the license due to lack of revenue.

C and D category cities are allowed to network and share programming, but generally, channels prefer to do in-house programming.

News is not permitted on private FM. Nationally, many of the current FM players – like the Times of India, Hindustan Times, Mid-Day, BBC etc. – are essentially newspaper chains or media, and they are making a strong pitch for News on FM.

St Xavier's College in Mapusa announced the starting of its campus community radio, named Voice of Xavier's (VOX) on 17 December 2006 at 90.4 MHz. The station had a power output of 20 watts. This was Goa's second FM station. It did not however stay in operation apart from test broadcasts. This does not currently operate (as of July 2013).

== Television ==
Goa is served by almost all the television channels available in India. Channels are received through cable in most parts of Goa. In the interior regions, channels are received via satellite dishes. Television was introduced on 19 November 1982, coinciding with Doordarshan's coverage of the 1982 Asian Games, which were held in New Delhi.

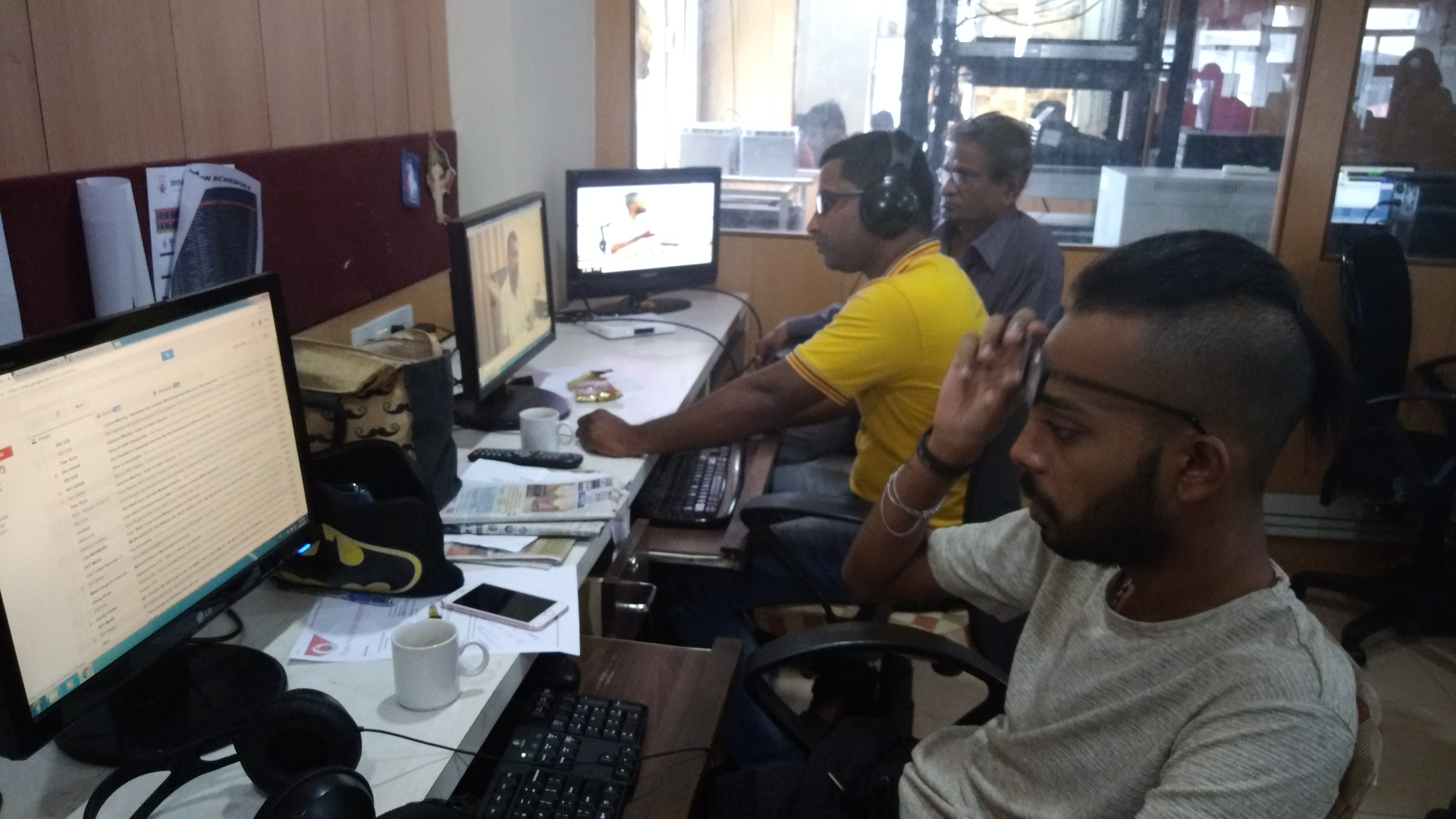
Goa 365 TV channel, Goa. 2018.

Doordarshan (DD), the national television broadcaster, has two free terrestrial channels on air: DD National and DD News. DD National broadcasts programmes of short duration in local languages (Konkani, Marathi) on DD Panaji. Goa has all the cable TV channels generally found in India, namely: MTV, ESPN, Fox, Zee TV, ZEE Marathi, HBO, Star Plus, Star Movies, BBC, CNN, Tensports, AXN, Star World, Star News, Fashion TV, Sony, Set Max, SAB, Sahara One, Sahara News, Discovery Channel, National Geographic Channel, Animal Planet, Channel X5 etc. Electronic media with DTH (Direct To Home) TV services are available from Dish TV, Tata Sky & DD Direct Plus. DD Panaji made its national launch on Free Dish in 2019.

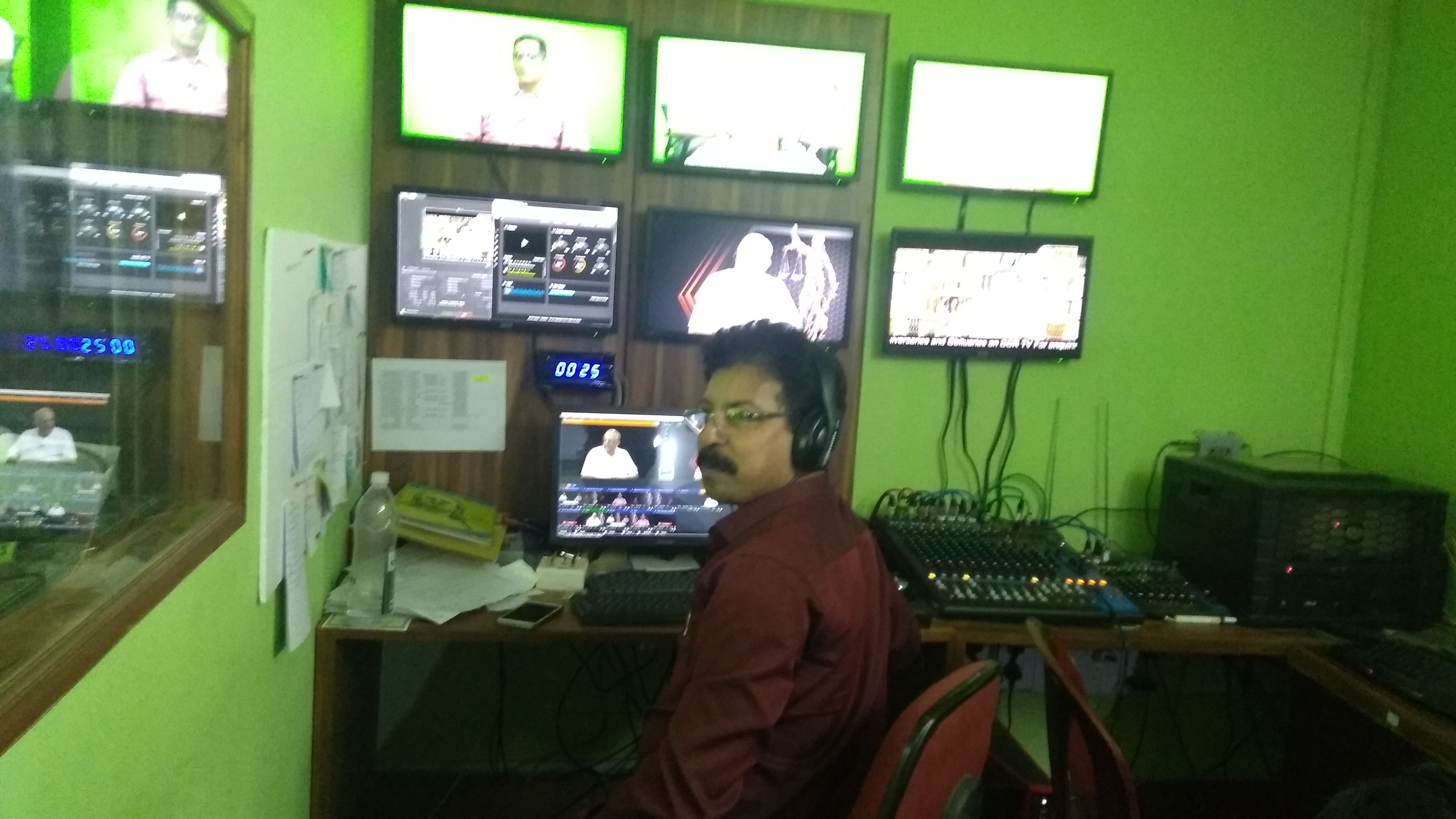
CCR TV Goa, 2018.

Beside these Goa has many major local channels, which cover local events, including political developments, and which reach viewers through the local cable network. These include Goa News Network (GNN) (Konkani), GOA365 (English /Konkani), Prudent (Konkani), CCR TV (A catholic Religious Channel in English/Konkani) RDXGOA TV(Konkani\English), In Goa News (Marathi\English), Goa Newsline (Konkani), Goa Plus and HCN (English), DBTV a children's educational channel among others. In Goa 24x7 is the only 24-hour live Marathi channel. In April 2015 - Prime Media Goa, a Cable Television Channel has caught the imagination of a large section of the population, not just in Goa but across the globe. The earlier BJP government, at the start of the first decade of this century, officially acknowledged that it was subsidising the operations of some networks, arguing that this was needed to promote programming in the local language

== Internet television ==
In August 2011, a live internet news webcast was commenced by In Goa News.

Most of the Konkani TV channel are available live streaming on the internet. www.konkanitv.ga is one such sites that allows you to watch most of the above television channels live . The other Religious channel, CCR TV is viewable at www.ccr-tv.com

== Film festivals ==
Goa became permanent venue to International Film Festival Of India in 2004

Gaur International Film Festival which will be hosted in 2025 is set to be Goa's first film festival curated towards the local population.

== Critiques of the media ==
Writing in the early 1980s, anthropologist Dr Robert S Newman spoke about the relationship with the media in Goa with the "big families" – mainly comprising "a handful of small-businessmen, traditional landowners, and war profiteers (who) received iron ore mining licenses, and were encouraged to dig and ship the ore to Japan (which needed it for reconstruction after World War II)."

Anthropologist Robert Newman has argued that "[Goa's first post-colonial chief minister Dayanand] Bandodkar and his fellow industrialists attempted to shape public opinion through their newspapers – there are almost no independent papers in Goa – and through tertiary educational institutions which they themselves had established. The Chowgules, for example, launched the newspapers Gomantak and Uzvadd, and were founders of an arts and science college at Margao; the Salgaocars founded a law college; and the Dempos own The Navhind Times and Navprabha, and are involved in Dhempe College at Miramar."

A study that looks at popular protest and how the media in "free Goa" responded to it, comments: "In Goa, the daily newspapers' editorial stances on various protest movements would tend to reveal a largely unfriendly attitude towards such actions. It is not perhaps coincidental that individuals and groups involved in protest issues in Goa have often felt that they have received an unfair deal from the media." This book chapter looks at protest and the media response to it in Goa over a three decade period, from the early 1960s to the 1990s.
