= Kulapurusha =

Kulpurush (called as कुलपुरुष in Sanskrit and कुळपुरुस or पुरुस in Konkani) is believed to be the progenitor of a clan. Kul literally could mean lineage, race, family, or clan and Purusha could mean man, soul, spirit or even chief.

This aspect of ancestral worship is very predominant in Goa and is still practiced today. According to Goan Folklore researcher Mr. Vinayak Vishnu Khedekar, the word Purus or Puris originated from the Sanskrit word Puris. All the communities and castes including Brahmins have custom of and tradition of Kulapurusha in their clan. A separate temple is found in the vicinity of Kuldevta temple, and Kulapurush is often worshipped in the form of Shiva or Narayana or sometimes in the form of a stone, sword, idol, or any other form like a stick or even a shield.

== See also ==
- Ancestral worship
