= Shakuntala Bharne =

Indian writer

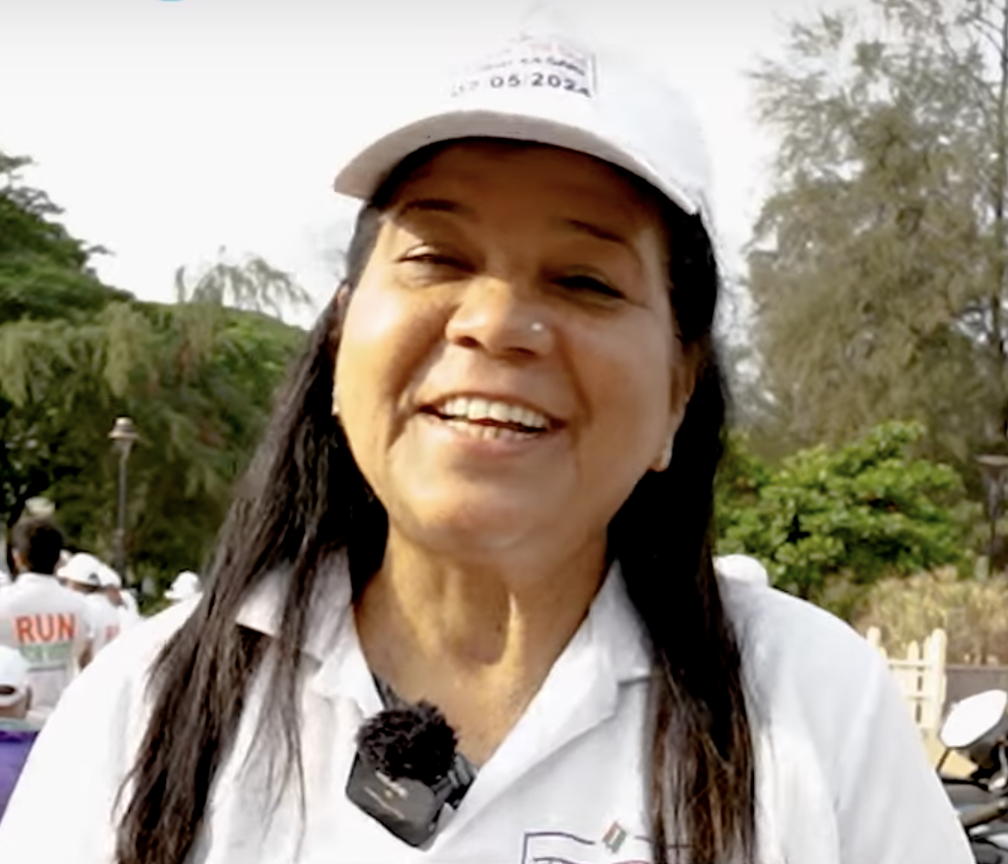
- Bharne in 2024
- Occupations: Vocalist, writer, poet and announcer at All India Radio

Shakuntala Bharne is an Indian vocalist, writer, poet and announcer at All India Radio. She is a writer and activist of the Konkani language agitation.

== Career ==
She trained in music under the guidance of Gangubai Hangal, in Hubli. She has done a double graduation. She has written two books on music - Swaranand and Naadbrahm, for which she received Goa Konkani Akademi and Konkani Bhasha Mandal award. She also wrote the biography of Pt. Prabhakar Karekar. She released an album called Goph at Swaranjali, a tribute concert to Gangubai Hangal. She was one of the poets at Uttējana, a poetry recital in Konkani, in 2014. In 2016, she performed at Vasant Bahar - Konkani Geetancho Haar, a Konkani musical programme. In 2017, she performed at Ghumttachem Fest, in Socorro, Goa. She was also part of the Multilingual Poetry Convention organised in Dadar, Mumbai, by Sahitya Akademi. She hosted the Swarasamrani Girijatai Kelkar music festival in 2018. She was also part of The Navhind Times' series, Your Career Matters in 2019.
