= Vaman Sardesai =

Indian activist and diplomat (1923–1994)

- Portrait of Sardesai
- Born: Vaman Balkrishna Naique Prataprao Sardesai; 5 May 1923; Vadi, Goa, Portuguese India,
- Died: 6 May 1994 (aged 71)
- Spouse: Libia Lobo Sardesai (m. 1964)
- Awards: Padma Shri (1992)

Vaman Balkrishna Naique Prataprao Sardesai (5 May 1923 – 6 May 1994) was an Indian poet, independence activist and diplomat. Along with Libia Lobo Sardesai, whom he later married, he ran an underground radio station, Voice of Freedom, that transmitted across Portuguese Goa from 1955 to 1961, advocating the cause of the Goan independence movement. Following the Annexation of Goa, he became the second editor of Goa Today magazine, and went on to become an IAS officer, serving as the Indian Ambassador to Angola. In 1992, he was awarded the Padma Shri. He has also been the co-convenor of INTACH.

== Life and career ==
=== Early life: Education, writing and radio (1923–1954) ===
Vaman Balkrishna Naique Prataprau Sardesai was born to Bhalchandra Desai on 5 May 1923 in the village of Vadi, Portuguese Goa. Sardesai was a student of medicine at Escola Médica Cirúrgica de Goa when he was arrested in 1947 for distributing "anti-colonial literature". He was sentenced to nine months' imprisonment by the Portuguese Military Tribunal.

Following his release, he moved to Wardha and spent four years at Gandhi's Sevagram ashram. There, he worked with Ravindra Kelekar to publish Konkani language poems in their fortnightly publication Meerg, writing under the pseudonym of "Abhijeet". Sardesai travelled around Nagpur to help in the magazine's success and ensured that copies would be distributed across the country. His writings displayed his strong linguistic skills. He was skilled in Konkani, Marathi, and Portuguese languages. Even though he left his education incomplete, he taught language subjects in important educational institutions in Panaji.

Then Prime Minister of India, Jawaharlal Nehru, respected Goa and implemented policies that allowed many poets and writers fleeing from Goa to join government service. This led to Sardesai joining the External Services Division at All India Radio, Bombay. As part of this, he created poems and programmes to spread awareness about "the problem of Goa" to other countries.

=== Voice of Freedom (1955–1961) ===
In 1954–55, the Portuguese attacked and killed several unarmed Satyagrahis who had forcefully entered the Goan borders, demanding the end of colonial rule in Goa. Following this, India closed its borders with Goa, imposing an economic blockade, thus reducing free movement and trade. Sardesai, Libia Lobo and Nicolau Menezes, a fellow independence activist who had been living in hiding in Bombay, came together to form a team. Using two wireless radio sets, which were confiscated the Portuguese, were converted into a radio transmitter. This grew to be the Voice of Freedom radio station, through which Sardesai, Lobo and Menezes would transmit news and important information to Goans.

They initially lived in the jungles of Amboli Ghat, approx. 100 km (62 mi) from Goa, transmitting an hour-long programme. After Menezes and his wife left, Sardesai and Lobo shifted to Castle Rock, Karnataka (approx. 50 km (31 mi) from Goa).

In the days preceding Operation Vijay, Lobo and Sardesai were contacted by the Indian defence forces. On 17 December 1961, the station transmitted a direct message from then Defence Minister of India, V. K. Krishna Menon, requesting the Portuguese Governor General to surrender. Following the success of Operation Vijay and the annexation of Goa on 19 December 1961, Lobo and Sardesai boarded an Indian Air Force plane with a radio and loudspeaker attached to it, flying over Goa and dropping leaflets and announcing the independence of Goa.

=== Post-annexation (1961 onwards) ===
Sardesai and Lobo got married on 19 December 1964. They had no children.

Sardesai was among the first three senior officers from Goa to join the Indian Administrative Service and was given significant responsibilities, serving as director of various departments such as Industries, Information, Sales Tax Commissionerate, and District Collector.

Sardesai became the second editor of Goa Today magazine, after which he went on to serve as the Indian Ambassador to Angola from 1988 to 1991. He was also the co-convenor of INTACH.

== Awards ==
While serving as the Indian Ambassador to Angola, Sardesai was awarded a medal by their Prime Minister for his meritorious service. In 1992, Sardesai was awarded the Padma Shri.
