= Libia Lobo Sardesai =

Indian independence activist (born 1924)

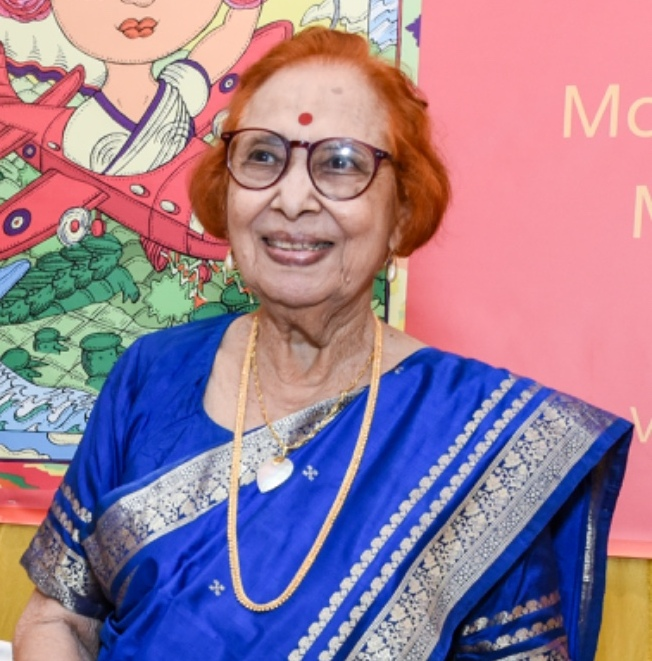
- Lobo celebrating her 100th birthday in 2024
- Born: Libia Lobo; 25 May 1924 (age 102); Porvorim, Goa, Portuguese India
- Other name: Libby
- Occupation: Lawyer
- Known for: Voice of Freedom
- Spouse: Vaman Sardesai (m. 1964; died 1994)
- Awards: Padma Shri (2025)

Libia Lobo Sardesai (née Lobo; born 25 May 1924) is an Indian independence activist and lawyer. Along with Vaman Sardesai, whom she later married, she ran an underground radio station, Voice of Freedom, that transmitted across Portuguese Goa from 1955 to 1961, advocating the cause of the Goan independence movement. Following the Indian annexation of Goa, she was the first Director of Tourism of Goa, Daman and Diu. In January 2025, Libia Lobo Sardesai was honored with the Padma Shri, India's fourth-highest civilian award, by the Government of India.

== Life and career ==
=== Early life (1924–1954) ===
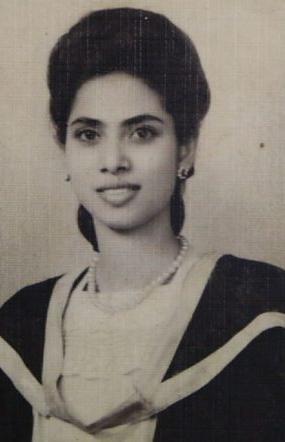
Lobo in her early years

Libia Lobo, known by the nickname of "Libby", was born on 25 May 1924 to a Catholic family in Porvorim, Portuguese Goa. Her family moved to Bombay some time in her childhood. She was friends with painter F. N. Souza in her childhood and they both grew up near Crawford Market. As a student, she was part of T. B. Cunha's Goan Youth League. She was its secretary from 1948 to 1950.

She began her career as a translator and a "censor", working on deciphering cryptic letters written by Italian prisoners of war during World War II. She simultaneously completed a degree at Siddharth College of Arts, Science and Commerce, which was established by B. R. Ambedkar. Ambedkar himself expressed his pleasure during her admission process. It was in her college days that Lobo began contributing to the Goan independence movement. She was greatly influenced by M. N. Roy, who had been introduced to her by Nissim Ezekiel and other professors of hers. Lobo was later hired as a stenographer and a librarian at All India Radio (AIR), Bombay. She pursued a degree in Law while employed at AIR.

=== Voice of Freedom (1955–1961) ===
In 1954–55, the Portuguese attacked and killed several Satyagrahis who had peacefully entered the Goan borders, demanding the end of colonial rule in Goa. Following this, India closed its borders with Goa, imposing an economic blockade, thus reducing free movement and trade. Lobo, Vaman Sardesai and Nicolau Menezes, a Goan independence activist who had been living in hiding in Bombay, came together to form a team. Using two wireless radio sets, which were confiscated the Portuguese, were converted into a radio transmitter. This became the Voice of Freedom radio station, through which Lobo, Sardesai and Menezes would transmit news and important information to Goans.

They initially lived in the jungles of Amboli Ghat, approx. 100 km (62 mi) from Goa, transmitting an hour-long programme. After Menezes and his wife left, Lobo and Sardesai shifted to Castle Rock, Karnataka (approx. 50 km (31 mi) from Goa). Lobo took the alias of "Vimal Nadkarni" to hide from the Portuguese.

In the days preceding Operation Vijay, Lobo and Sardesai were contacted by the Indian defence forces. On 17 December 1961, the station transmitted a direct message from then Defence Minister of India, V. K. Krishna Menon, requesting the Portuguese Governor General to surrender. Following the success of Operation Vijay and the Indian annexation of Goa on 19 December 1961, Lobo and Sardesai boarded an Indian Air Force plane with a radio and loudspeaker attached to it, flying over Goa and dropping leaflets and announcing the freedom of Goa.

=== Post annexation (1961 onwards) ===
Following the Indian annexation of Goa, Lobo joined the Ministry of External Affairs to help in their efforts to repatriate the captured Portuguese troops.

Lobo and Sardesai got married on 19 December 1964. They had no children.

Lobo was the first Director of Tourism for Goa, Daman and Diu after the annexation of Goa. She is regarded as the first practicing female lawyer in Goa. She went on to be the founder and promoter of the Women’s Cooperative Bank, which, as of 2024, is fully run by women. She was also the founder and president of the Goa College of Home Sciences. In 1994, following her husband's death, she founded the Vedanta Institute "to help people become better versions of themselves".

As of 2018, Lobo lives in the city of Panaji, Goa.

== Legacy and awards ==
Lobo's life story is displayed at the renovated museum at the Aguada fort.

On the occasion of her 100th birthday in 2024, F. N. Souza's grandson, Solomon Souza, painted a mural on the wall of a building facing Lobo's house in Panaji.

She was awarded the Padma Shri in 2025.

Legacy of Libia Lobo Sardesai
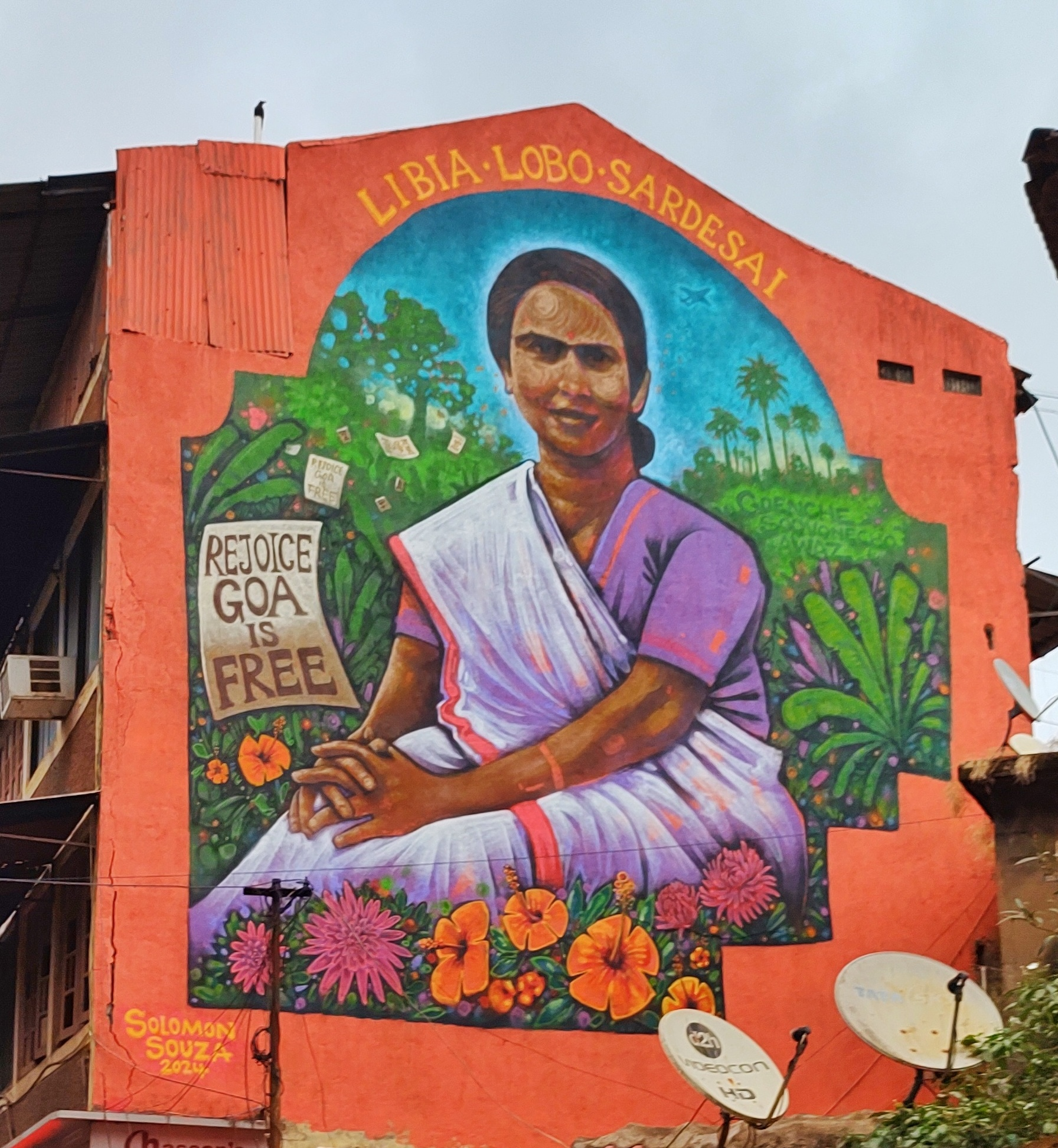
Mural depicting Libia Lobo Sardesai in Panjim, Goa

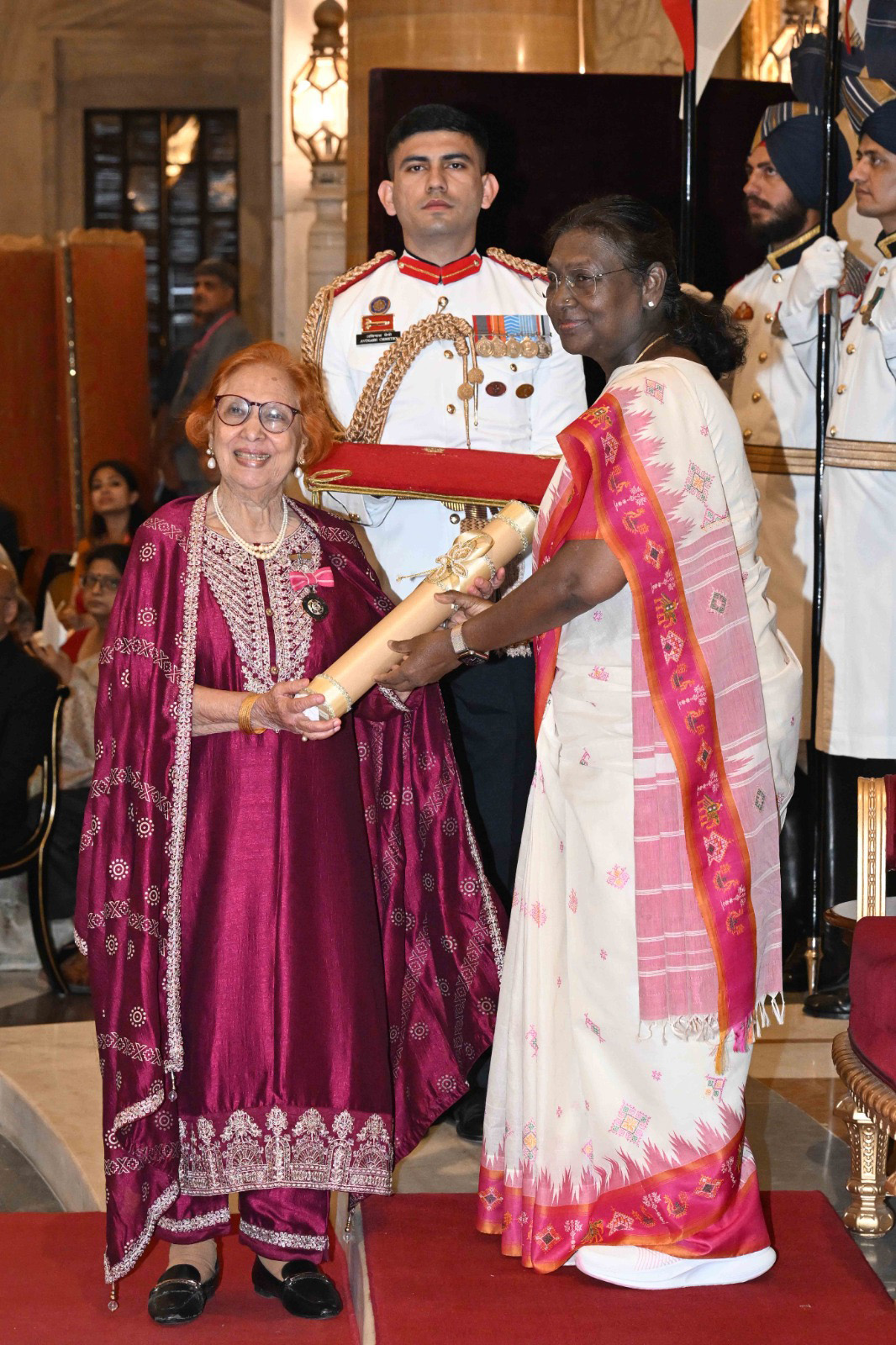
Lobo receiving her Padma Shri in 2025
