= Khedekar =

Khedekar is a surname. People with the surname include:

- Sachin Khedekar
- Vinayak Khedekar
- Ayush Mahesh Khedekar
- Shashikant Narsingrao Khedekar

== See also ==
- Purushottam Khedekar
