= Narayan Mauzo =

Indian language activist (1939/1940–2023)

- Portrait of Mauzo in his later years
- Born: Narayan Ramnath Mauzo c. 1939 or c. 1940; Goa, Portuguese India, Portuguese Empire (now in India)
- Died: 6 February 2023 (aged 83); Margao, Goa, India
- Resting place: Mathagramast Hindu Sabha Crematorium, Margao, Goa, India
- Other name: Bhau
- Occupations: Language activist; businessman
- Years active: c. 1979–2023
- Organisation: Konkani Bhasha Mandal
- Title: Owner of Mauzo Studio
- Movement: Konkani language agitation
- Spouse: Meena
- Children: 1
- Father: Ramnath Mauzo
- Relatives: Laxman Pai (first cousin)

Narayan Ramnath Mauzo (1939 or 1940 – 6 February 2023), also known as Bhau, was an Indian language activist and businessman who was involved in the establishment of the Konkani Bhasha Mandal (KBM) and served as its treasurer. He played a key role in the founding of the organization and was actively involved in supporting a Konkani medium school. Mauzo was an experienced participant in the Konkani movement.

== Career ==
Mauzo, a founding member of the Vidya Bhuvan Konkani School, played a significant role in its establishment. This primary school, affiliated with the Konkani Bhasha Mandal (KBM), was initiated under the leadership of Uday Bhembre, the then-president. Despite the absence of government subsidies, Mauzo and a few other early supporters wholeheartedly backed the school's inception. During the planning stages, discussions and debates arose among the board members and activists regarding the necessary steps to launch the school. Concurrently, the board learned that the Mathgramstha Hindu Sabha in Comba, Goa, was considering the closure of a montessori school under its administration.

Mauzo and Chandrakant Keni were actively involved in these deliberations. Subsequently, Mauzo and other dedicated individuals invested considerable efforts to bring the montessori school under the KBM's purview. Their endeavors proved successful, leading to the establishment of the Vidya Bhuvan Konkani School in 1979. However, financial challenges persisted, especially concerning transportation for the students. In response to this predicament, Mauzo and a group of committed Konkani activists took the initiative to arrange for a Tempo Traveller, which they personally financed, to address the transportation needs of the students.

Mauzo was a prominent figure within the Konkani Bhasha Mandal, recognized for his pivotal role in overseeing the organization's activities, as well as its affiliated schools-Vidya Bhuvan Konkani School in Aquem and Ravindra Kelekar Dnyanmandir in Margao. He dedicated his efforts to support various organizations and individuals, discreetly assisting them without seeking recognition.

On 1 October 2022, the Konkani Basha Mandal marked a significant milestone, celebrating its 60th Foundation Day. During this commemorative event, the Mandal bestowed honors upon distinguished personalities from Goa who had made notable contributions to the promotion and development of the Konkani language within the state and beyond. Mauzo served as part of the esteemed jury panel, alongside Sandesh Prabhudesai and Zilu Gaonkar, responsible for selecting the recipient of the prestigious "Konkani Bhasha Mandal Service Award."

=== Mauzo studio (1990–2023) ===
Mauzo Studio, located in Margao, Goa, gained recognition for its proprietor, Mauzo, who was known for his discreet and reserved approach to his work. Founded by Mauzo's father, Ramnath, in 1936, the studio has a long-standing history in the field of photography. In 1945, it relocated to its current location in Margao. Originally named Mauzo Fotografo, the studio underwent a name change to Mauzo Studio and became the second photography establishment in Margao after Lords Photo Studio. Following the passing of his father in 1990, Mauzo assumed the role of proprietor, ensuring the continuity of the studio's legacy.

== Personal life ==
Narayan Ramnath Mauzo was born in either c. 1939 or c. 1940 in Goa, which was part of the Portuguese India and is now a part of the Republic of India. His father, Ramnath Mauzo, gained acclaim as a photo artist and photographer. Mauzo's ancestral lineage in Goa runs deep, as he shares his name with his grandfather, Narayan "Nani" Mauzo, who was engaged in the tobacco trade during the period of Portuguese colonial rule and operated a modest shop in Margao's Old Market. Additionally, on his paternal side, Mauzo is also the first cousin of the artist Laxman Pai. Mauzo entered into matrimony with Meena, and their union brought forth a son named Hiresh.

== Awards ==
Mauzo held a distinct perspective on receiving awards during his life. Although he turned down the majority of accolades offered to him by different organizations, there was an exception. He made a decision to accept the "Dnyanpithkar Ravindra Kelekar Konkani Language Award" from the Directorate of Official Languages, Government of Goa, following persuasion from the Konkani community. However, even prior to the award funds being transferred to his bank account, he generously donated the entirety of the amount to several other Konkani organizations.

On 27 April 2016, Mauzo was honored at the 2015 Bhasha Puraskar Awards, where he was nominated for and ultimately won the "Gyanpeeth Padmabhushan Late Ravindra Kelekar Bhasha Puraskar." This award recognized his contributions to the Konkani language. The award included a monetary honorarium of ₹1 lakh (equivalent to ₹1.4 lakh or US$1,500 in 2023), a shawl, a manpatra (a formal letter of appreciation), and a memento. The ceremony took place at the Kala Academy and was attended by notable figures such as Milind Naik, the then-minister for Official Language, former deputy speaker Vishnu Wagh, and Padma Jaiswal, the Secretary of Official Language.

== Death ==
On 6 February 2023, Mauzo died at the age of 83 after a brief illness. The news of his demise brought about a sense of shock and grief among individuals associated with the Konkani movement. The following day, Mauzo's funeral took place at the Mathagramasth Hindu Sabha Crematorium in Margao, where he was cremated according to Hindu traditions.

=== Reactions ===
Anwesha Singbal, the president of Konkani Bhasha Mandal (KBM), expressed profound sorrow over the loss of Mauzo. Singbal acknowledged his unwavering dedication to the Konkani movement and described him as an inspiration to young people. She emphasized that KBM would continue its important work, drawing strength from the legacy Mauzo left behind.

=== Aftermath ===
On 19 February 2023, recognizing the significant contributions of Mauzo and another figure, Nagesh Karmali, the Konkani Bhasha Mandal organized a condolence meeting.
