= Ramnath Mauzo =

Indian photographer (1910–1990)

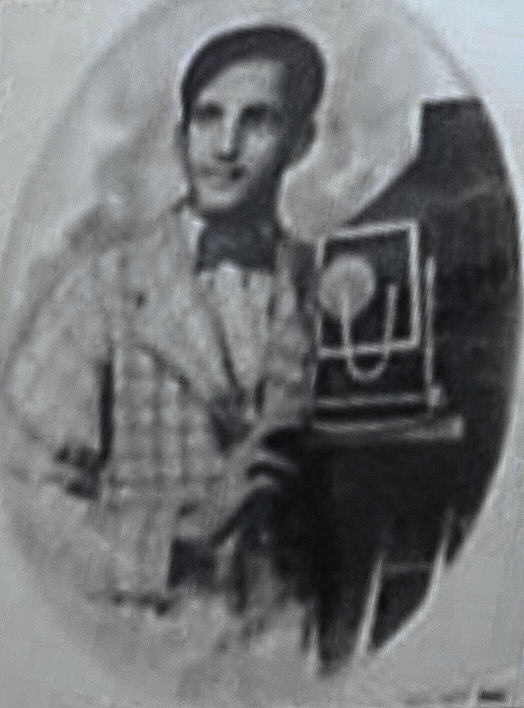
- Mauzo with his camera at his studio
- Born: Ramanath Narain Sinai Mauzo c. 1910; Goa, Portuguese India, Portuguese Empire (now in India)
- Died: 15 May 1990 (aged 79–80); Margao, Goa, India
- Education: G K Vale European School, Bangalore
- Occupations: Photo artist; photographer; actor
- Years active: 1930s–1990
- Title: Founder of Mauzo Fotografo (now Mauzo Studio)
- Children: Narayan Mauzo (son)
- Relatives: Laxman Pai (nephew)

Ramanath Narayan "Ramnath" Mauzo (born Ramanath Narain Sinai Mauzo; c. 1910 – 15 April 1990), also known as R N Mauzo, was an Indian photo artist, photographer, and actor best known for founding the photography studio Mauzo Fotografo in 1936. He further gained recognition for his award-winning portrait Luz E Sombra (1940). His notable students include artist Laxman Pai, and Bollywood cinematographer K Vaikunth.

== Early life ==
Mauzo, born in c. 1910 in Goa, India (then under Portuguese rule), was initially known as Ramanath Narain Sinai Mauzo, later changing his name to Ramanath Narayan Mauzo. He hailed from a family involved in the tobacco trade, with his father, Narain Sinai Mauzo (later Narayan Mauzo), also known as Nani. Mauzo had a sister named Radhabai. Mauzo's son, Narayan, shared the same name as his grandfather. The former was as a Konkani activist and businessman. Mauzo possessed a deep love for music and excelled in playing various musical instruments. Additionally, he showcased his versatility by singing classical music and engaging in theatrical performances, often assuming female roles on stage.

== Career ==
Mauzo inaugurated his inaugural studio in Margão on 25 November 1936, subsequent to completing his training. The studio underwent relocation in 1945, finding its current abode. Initially, Mauzo engaged in the importation of photographic merchandise from brands such as Mimosa, Kodak, Ilford, among others. In due course, Mauzo Fotografo (later renamed Mauzo Studio) emerged in Vasco and Pangim in 1956 and 1958, respectively. However, in the wake of Goa's liberation, these establishments were compelled to shutter their operations due to labor shortages and other logistical challenges. Notably, the principal enterprise itself had to undergo two relocations before eventually settling along Margao's Luis Miranda road, where it remains operational to this day.

Throughout his formative years, Mauzo harbored a desire to venture beyond the confines of Goa and explore the world through the lens of his camera. Accompanied by his close associates Dinanath Dalal and Raghuvir Mulgaokar, Mauzo aspired to try their fortunes in the artistic realm by venturing to Bombay (present-day Mumbai). While Dalal and Mulgaokar ascended to the ranks of stardom and acclaim, Mauzo chose to remain rooted in Goa until his demise. Pawaskar of O Heraldo writes, Mauzo etched an indelible chapter in the annals of the photography world, as his protégés dispersed across the globe, bringing him immense pride and acclaim.

Pawaskar further writes, Mauzo left a lasting impact through his teachings and mentorship. Laxman Pai, a renowned artist and painter of international acclaim, had the privilege of being Mauzo's student and nephew. Under Mauzo's guidance, Pai flourished and eventually ascended to the position of the first principal at the esteemed Goa College of Art in Altinho, Goa. Additionally, Mauzo's mentorship extended to K Vaikunth, a prominent cinematographer from Goa who found success in the world of Bollywood. Today, Atish Vaikunth, the son of K Vaikunth, follows in his father's footsteps as a director of photography in Mumbai.

In recognition of his exceptional contributions to the fields of art and photography, Mauzo was honored with a month-long tour of Portugal in 1960. This tour, arranged by Manuel António Vassalo e Silva, the final Portuguese Governor, served as a tribute to Mauzo's unparalleled dedication and achievements. Narayan, Mauzo's son, took on the responsibility of preserving a collection of rare photographs, documents, and newspaper clippings from the Portuguese era. Among the treasures in this collection was an old photograph of Pandit Jawaharlal Nehru, the former Prime Minister of India, taken at Aeroporto General Bénard Guedes. Despite facing stringent security measures, Mauzo managed to capture the photograph. Regrettably, he faced consequences from the Portuguese authorities and was incarcerated. However, before his apprehension, Mauzo cleverly disposed of the roll of film in the nearby bushes. Following his release, he successfully recovered the roll, astonishingly finding the same photograph intact.

During the early era of photography, a specialized apparatus consisting of a bellow camera, a sizable tripod, and wooden film slides was essential for capturing images. Given the logistical challenges involved in transporting this equipment, photographers often preferred working within studio settings rather than venturing to remote locations. However, the Mauzo family enjoyed the advantage of owning a car, which facilitated the transportation of their gear.

To overcome the difficulties of reaching households situated in distant areas, Mauzo enlisted the assistance of a bhadeli who would bear the weight of the camera box on her head, while Mauzo himself drove the car as close as possible to the desired destination. Affluent individuals would extend invitations to Mauzo, welcoming him into their homes to capture family portraits. Though the remuneration for his services was not exceptionally lucrative considering the efforts and hardships endured, Mauzo's artistic prowess was duly recognized.

== Personal life ==
Mauzo's artistic pursuits faced various challenges. In an interview with O Heraldo, Narayan revealed that his father, being the sole provider for their family, was unable to pursue his artistic passion in Bombay due to financial constraints. However, Mauzo's determination remained unwavering, and he established an Art School in Margão to nurture artistic talent. Regrettably, societal attitudes during that era regarded acting, dancing, and singing as occupations of low esteem, resulting in the closure of his Art School. Undeterred, Mauzo redirected his artistic inclination towards photography and sought formal education in the field at the G K Vale European School in Bangalore. On 15 May 1990, Mauzo died at Old Market in Margao at the age of 79 or 80.

== Photography style ==
Pawaskar of O Heraldo writes, Mauzo was acclaimed for his meticulous attention to detail as a photographer. His devotion to his craft was evident to such an extent that he would occasionally mistakenly dip his paintbrush into his tea. As a young boy, Narayan was tasked with the responsibility of serving Mauzo tea during the afternoon sessions, ensuring that such inadvertent blunders were avoided. Mauzo's commitment to perfection manifested in the success of his photography, particularly in his skillful portrayal of soon-to-be-married young women, which garnered considerable acclaim.

== Awards ==
In 1932, Mauzo was bestowed with a prestigious gold medal by Waman Gopal Joshi in recognition of his exceptional photographic portrayal of Narayan Shenvi Kirtani. Subsequently, in 1940, the British Government organized the Premiadona Exposisao de Arte em, a renowned art competition held in British India that attracted participation from artists representing 25 countries worldwide. Mauzo decided to submit his artwork titled Luz E Sombra from Goa, which was executed using crayon and coal. Notably, Mauzo emerged as the winner in the esteemed light and shadow category, securing the coveted first prize. In 1986, Mauzo's outstanding contributions to the realm of art were duly acknowledged when he received the esteemed State Cultural Award from the Government of Goa.

== Legacy ==
Mauzo's artistic prowess is evident through the prominent display of his portraits at various distinguished locations. These include the old Secretariat in Panjim, as well as the municipalities in Vasco da Gama and Margao, all situated in the picturesque region of Goa. Moreover, Mauzo's commitment to art's transformative power is exemplified by his generous donation of 60 paintings to Maria da Fonte, a prominent Portuguese freedom fighter. These artworks were intended to enhance the visual environment of Portuguese government schools. The artistic legacy of Mauzo extends further with the inclusion of his portrait of Laibhaskar Khapruji Parvatkar adorning the walls of the esteemed Swarmanch Institute located in Comba.
