= Prabhakar Karekar =

Indian Hindustani classical vocalist (1944–2025)

Pandit Prabhakar Karekar
- Born: Prabhakar Janardhan Karekar; 1944; Portuguese Goa
- Died: 12 February 2025 (aged 80); Mumbai, Maharashtra, India
- Occupations: Classical singer, vocalist
- Awards: Gomant Vibhushan (2021); Sangeet Natak Akademi Award (2016); Tansen Samman (2014)

Pandit Prabhakar Karekar (1944 – 12 February 2025) was an Indian Hindustani classical vocalist, born in Goa, Portuguese India. He was awarded Tansen Samman in 2014, the Sangeet Natak Akademi Award in the year 2016 and the Gomant Vibhushan Award in 2021.

== Background ==
Prabhakar Janardan Karekar was born into a Daivadnya family in 1944, which was then Portuguese Goa. His Hindustani vocal music training came from Suresh Haldankar, Jitendra Abhisheki, and C. R. Vyas. He was known as an outstanding performer and teacher, and was a graded artist of All India Radio and Doordarshan.

== Death ==
Karekar died on 12 February 2025, at the age of 80 at his residence in Mumbai.

== Promoting Hindustani vocals ==
Karekar was also the founder and Chairman of the Swarprabha Trust. He trained several promising and accomplished young musicians. He had recordings to his credit and performed, lectured and held workshops or taken part in conferences in different countries.

== Fusion music ==
Karekar entered the world of fusion music with Ornette Coleman (U.S.A.), and Sultan Khan (India). The Sangeet Natak Akademi Award was for his contribution to Hindustani vocal music.

== See also ==
- Shakuntala Bharne, who wrote his biography.
