= Anil Kakodkar =

Indian nuclear physicist (born 1943)

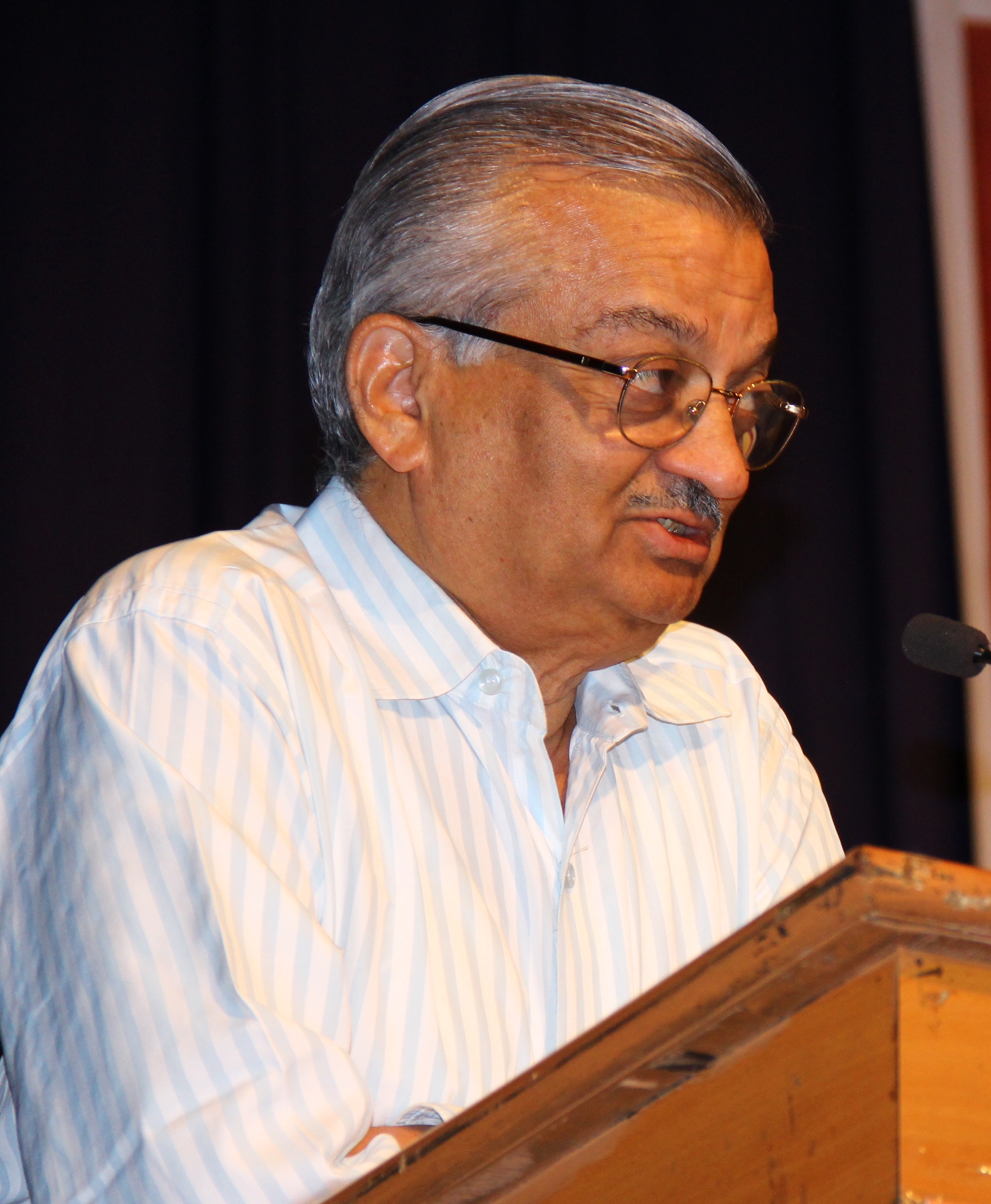

Chairman of Atomic Energy Commission of India
- In office 2000-2009
- Preceded by: R. Chidambaram
- Succeeded by: Srikumar Banerjee

Personal details
- Born: 11 November 1943 (age 82) Barwani, Central Provinces and Berar, British India
- Parent: Purushottam Kakodkar (father)
- Education: Ruparel College; VJTI, University of Mumbai; University of Nottingham
- Known for: Operation Shakti; Pokhran-II; Indian nuclear program
- Awards: Padma Shri (1998); Padma Bhushan (1999); Padma Vibhushan (2009); Gomant Vibhushan Award (2010); Maharashtra Bhushan (2011); G-Files awards (2015)
- Scientific career
- Fields: Mechanical Engineering, nuclear physics and nuclear power
- Workplaces: Atomic Energy Commission of India; Department of Atomic Energy; Bhabha Atomic Research Centre (BARC)

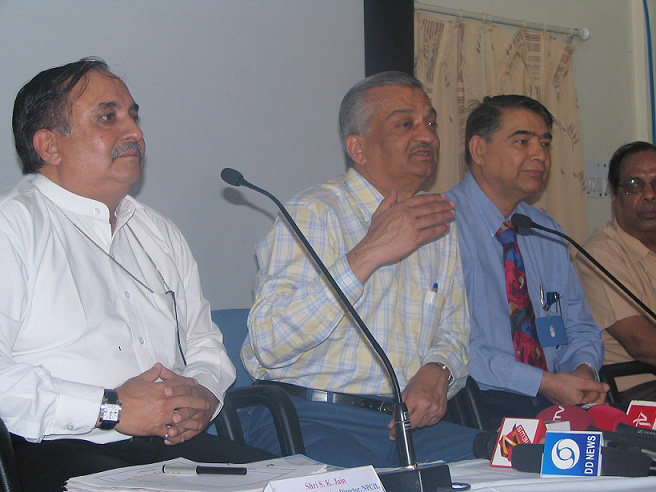
The Chairman Atomic Energy Commission and Secretary, Atomic Energy Dr. Anil Kakodkar in 2006

Anil Kakodkar (born 11 November 1943) is an Indian nuclear physicist and mechanical engineer. He was the chairman of the Atomic Energy Commission of India and the Secretary to the Government of India, he was the Director of the Bhabha Atomic Research Centre, Trombay (or Turbhe) from 1996 to 2000. He was awarded the Padma Vibhushan, India's second highest civilian honour, on 26 January 2009.

Apart from playing a major role in India's nuclear tests asserting sovereignty, Kakodkar champions India's self-reliance on thorium as a fuel for nuclear energy.

== Early life ==
Kakodkar was born on 11 November 1943 in Barwani princely state (present day Madhya Pradesh state) to Kamala Kakodkar and Purushottam Kakodkar, both Gandhian freedom fighters. He had his early education at Barwani and at Khargone, until moving to Mumbai for post-matriculation studies.

Kakodkar graduated from Ruparel College, then from VJTI, University of Mumbai with a degree in Mechanical Engineering in 1963. He joined the Bhabha Atomic Research Centre (BARC) in 1964. He obtained a master's degree in experimental stress analysis from the University of Nottingham in 1969.

== Career ==
He joined the Reactor Engineering Division of the BARC and played a key role in design and construction of the Dhruva reactor, a completely original but high-tech project. He was a part of the core team of architects of India's Peaceful Nuclear Tests in 1974 and 1998. Further he has led the indigenous development in India's Pressurised Heavy Water Reactor Technology. He worked in the rehabilitation of the two reactors at Kalpakkam and the first unit at Rawatbhata, which at one stage were on the verge of being written off.

In 1996 he became Director of the BARC and since 2000 he has been leading the Atomic Energy Commission of India and also is the secretary of the Department of Atomic Energy. He has published over 250 scientific papers.

He believes that India should be self-reliant in energy, especially by use of the cheap national thorium resources. He continues to engage in designing the Advanced Heavy Water Reactor, that uses thorium-uranium 233 as the primary energy source with plutonium as the driver fuel. The unique reactor system, with simplified but safe technology, will generate 75 per cent of electricity from thorium.

== Other positions ==
- Kakodkar is a member of many boards, commissions, and other organisations. Some of them are:
- Chairman, Board of Governors of the Indian Institute of Technology, Bombay – 2006–15.
- Chairman, Board of Directors of Maharashtra Knowledge Corporation Limited, Pune (current).
- Member, Atomic Energy Commission
- Member, ONGC Energy Centre Trust
- Chairman, empowered committee on IIT reforms
- Presently ^{updated April-2014} he is serving as a director on the central board of Reserve Bank of India.
- He is a Fellow of the Indian National Academy of Engineering and served as its president during 1999–2000.
- He is a Fellow of the Indian Academy of Sciences, the National Academy of Sciences, India and the Maharashtra Academy of Sciences.
- He is a member of the—International Nuclear Energy Academy and Honorary member of the World Innovation Foundation. He was member of the International Nuclear Safety Advisory Group (INSAG) during 1999–2002
- He is on the board of Governors of VJTI, Mumbai
- He will head Rail safety committee as per Rail budget speech by Railway Minister in 2012
- He is chairman Rajiv Gandhi Science and Technology Commission, Government of Maharashtra, Mantralaya, Mumbai.
- He is chairman of steering and monitoring committee of Biomedical Engineering and Technology (incubation) Centre, a network of 11 engineering and medical institutes for medical device innovation.
- He is chairperson of Dr. B R Ambedkar National Institute of Technology, Jalandhar.
- He is Chairman of Maharashtra Knowledge Corporation Limited

== Books ==
Fire and Fury Transforming India's Strategic Identity -- authored by Anil Kakodkar and Suresh Gangotra

== Awards ==
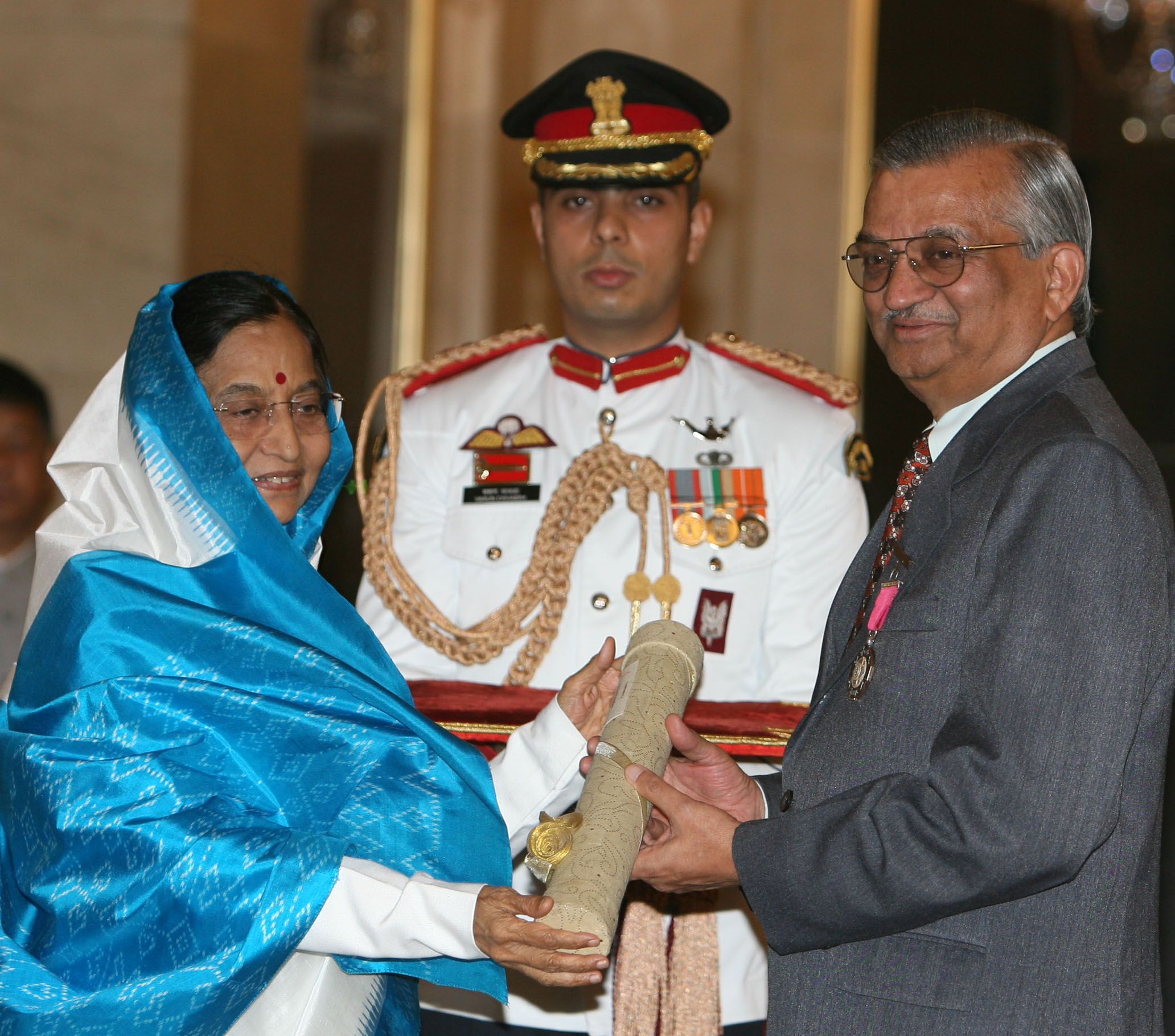
The former President Pratibha Devisingh Patil presenting the Padma Vibhushan to the then Chairman, Atomic Energy Commission, Dr. Anil Kakodkar, at the Civil Investiture Ceremony, at Rashtrapati Bhavan, in New Delhi on 31 March 2009

=== National awards ===
- Padma Shri in 1998
- Padma Bhushan in 1999
- Padma Vibhushan in 2009

=== Other awards ===
- Highest civilian award of the Maharashtra state-Maharashtra Bhushan Award (2011–2012)
- Highest civilian award of the Goa state-Gomant Vibhushan Award (2010)
- Hari Om Ashram Prerit Vikram Sarabhai Award (1988)
- H. K. Firodia Award for Excellence in Science and Technology (1997)
- Rockwell Medal for Excellence in Technology (1997)
- FICCI Award for outstanding contribution to Nuclear Science and Technology (1997–98)
- ANACON – 1998 Life Time Achievement Award for Nuclear Sciences
- Indian Science Congress Association's H. J. Bhabha Memorial Award (1999–2000)
- Godavari Gaurav Award (2000)
- Dr. Y. Nayudamma Memorial Award (2002)
- Chemtech Foundation's Achiever of the Year Award for Energy (2002)
- Gujar Mal Modi Innovative Science and Technology Award in 2004.
- Homi Bhabha Lifetime Achievement Award 2010.
- Acharya Varahmihir Award (2004) by Varahmihir Institute of Scientific Heritage and Research, Ujjain (M.P.), India
