= Lambert Mascarenhas =

Indian journalist and writer (1914–2021)

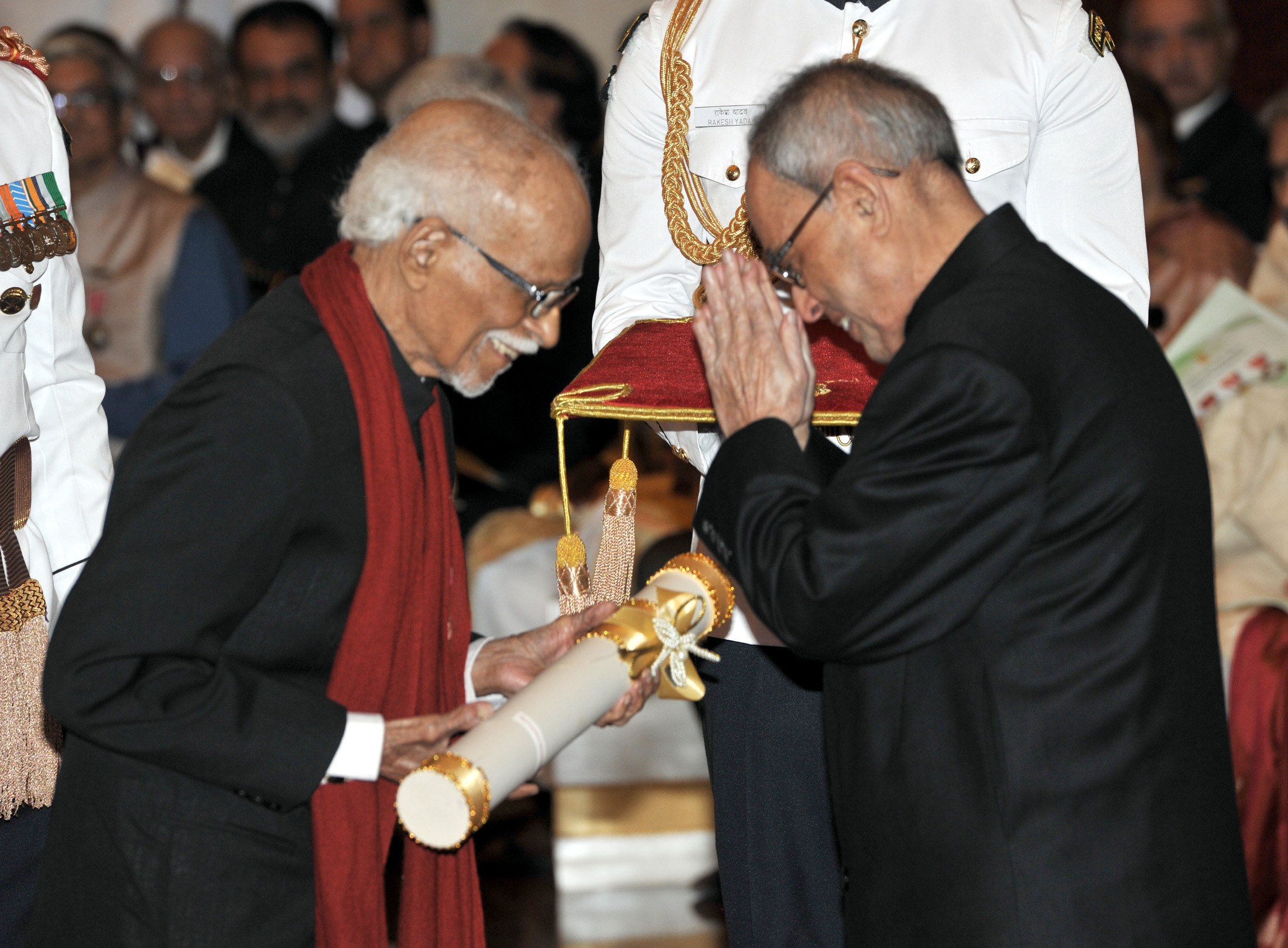
- Mascarenhas (left) receiving the Padma Shri in 2015
- Born: Emidio Francisco Lamberto Mascarenhas; 17 September 1914; Colva, Goa, Portuguese India
- Died: 27 June 2021 (aged 106); Dona Paula, Goa, India
- Education: St. Xavier's College
- Occupations: Writer; journalist; independence activist
- Spouse: Jolly Mascarenhas (m. 1961)
- Children: 4
- Writing career
- Notable work: Sorrowing Lies My Land
- Notable awards: Gomant Vibhushan (2014); Padma Shri (2015)

Emidio Francisco Lamberto "Lambert" Mascarenhas (17 September 1914 – 27 June 2021) was an Indian journalist, independence activist, and writer.

== Early and personal life ==
Mascarenhas was born in Colva, Portuguese India, but his early education took place in Poona and later at the St. Xavier's College, Bombay. He was married to Dr. Jolly Mascarenhas. He had four children. He had taken a vow that he would marry only after the freedom of Goa from the Portuguese rule. Hence, he married on 29 December 1961, exactly ten days after the annexation of Goa by India on 19 December 1961. His family was from the Goan Catholic community.

== Goa liberation movement ==
In December 1960, Mascarenhas was part of a delegation that met with then Home Minister of India Pandit Pant in New Delhi, urging the Indian government to take action for the freedom of Goa. Others in the delegation were Eclito D’Souza, Irene Heredia, Vishwanath Lawande, George Vaz, Aruna Asaf Ali and Bertha Braganza.

== Career ==
=== Journalism ===
Mascarenhas started his career as a journalist in the Morning Standard at Mumbai. He worked as a sub-editor at the Bombay Sentinel, under editor B. G. Horniman. Mascarenhas later joined the Onlooker as an assistant editor. He later edited the Goan Tribune, which espoused the cause of Goa's invasion by India. Upon his return to a liberated Goa in 1961, he joined as the editor of The Navhind Times and later established and edited Goa Today.

=== Contribution to the independence movement ===
Mascarenhas also contributed to India's freedom movement. He authored the Goan Tribune, which was dedicated to the cause of Goa's liberation. While at the Goan Tribune, he wrote numerous articles against the Portuguese colonial regime in Goa and caught the attention of both Indian leaders as well as the Portuguese regime. While on a visit to Goa, he was arrested and jailed by the Portuguese for his articles. He was later released on bail and expelled from Goa. In Bombay, he joined the National Congress (Goa).

== Death ==
Mascarenhas died on 27 June 2021 at the age of 106.

== Works ==
Mascarenhas authored several books, including the novel Sorrowing Lies My Land, published in 1955. This work of fiction was based in the anti-Portuguese movement launched by the Indian politician Rammanohar Lohia.

Mascarenhas' other works include The First City, In the Womb of Saudade, The Greater Tragedy and Heartbreak Passage.

== Awards ==
Mascarenhas was awarded the Laxmidas Borkar Memorial Award for journalism for 2004. He was also awarded Goa's highest civilian award, the Gomant Vibhushan, in 2014. He was awarded Padma Shri, the fourth highest civilian award of India, in 2015.
