= Gomanta kingdom =

Gomanta was a kingdom mentioned in the epic Mahabharata. It was an extension of the kingdom of Yadavas at Dwaraka. It is identified to be the Goa state of India, situated in the western coast. It was the southernmost extent of the region, occupied by the Yadava clans, finding explicit mention in Mahabharata.

== References in Mahabharata ==
Gomanta was mentioned as a kingdom of Ancient India (Bharata Varsha) along with the Mandakas, the Shandas, the Vidharbas etc. (6,9).

=== Establishment of Gomanta kingdom by Yadavas ===
The Yadavas of Mathura, the capital of Surasena kingdom, fled from there due to the continuous attack of Magadha king Jarasandha. They have reached as far south as Gomanta, the modern Indian state called Goa.

The unrighteous king of Surasena Kingdom, viz Kansa was slain by Vasudeva Krishna. Kansa's wives, Asti and Prapti, where the daughters of Jarasandha, the king of Magadha. He attacked the kinsmen of Krishna. The Surasena Yadavas, consisting of the eighteen younger branches of the Yadavas with their 18000 brothers and cousins, arrived at the conclusion that even if they fight continually they still could be unable to do anything unto Jarasandha even in 300 years. They fled from Mathura, towards west. They rebuilt the old town of Kusasthali(see:Cortalim), and renamed it Dwaraka. It was a Yadava stronghold. Yet, due to the oppressions of Jarasandha, Yadavas where obliged to migrate further south, to the mountains of Gomanta, measuring three Yojanas (a unit of length) in length. Within each yojana were established, 21 posts of armed men. And at intervals of each yojana were 100 gates with arches which were defended by valiant heroes engaged in guarding them. Innumerable Kshatriyas invincible in war, belonging to the eighteen younger branches of the Yadavas, were employed in defending these works. (2,14)

Bhoja Dynasty that ruled Goa from at least 3rd century AD to the 6th century AD are sometime identified as descendants of the Yadavas, and are also mentioned in Bhavishya Purana.

=== Other references ===
In the Krauncha island, there is a mountain called Maha-krauncha that is a mine of all kinds of gems. There is another mountain called Gomanta that is huge and consists of all kinds of metals. (9,

== In popular culture ==
Today the highest civilian honour of the state of Goa is called Gomant Vibhushan. It is given annually by Government of Goa since 2010.

== See also ==
- Kingdoms of Ancient India
- Goa
