= Laxman Pai =

Indian artist and painter (1926–2021)

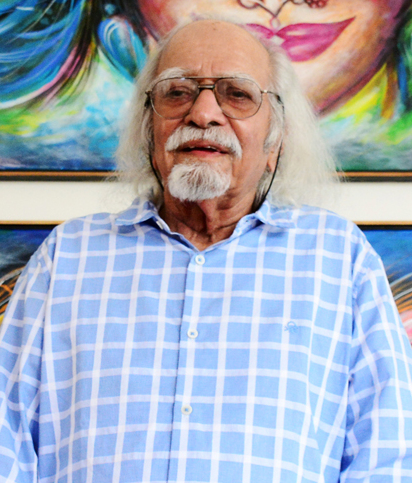
- Pai in 2016
- Born: 21 January 1926; Margão, Goa, Portuguese India
- Died: 14 March 2021 (aged 95); Dona Paula, Goa, India
- Occupation: Painter
- Known for: Contemporary paintings
- Spouse: Purnima Pai
- Children: 1
- Relatives: Ramnath Mauzo (uncle); Narayan Mauzo (cousin)
- Awards: Padma Bhushan; Padma Shri; Gomant Vibhushan
- Website: laxmanpai.com

Laxman Pai (21 January 1926 – 14 March 2021) was an Indian artist and painter. He was a principal of the Goa College of Art, a post he held from 1977 to 1987. Pai was a recipient of several awards including India's third highest civilian honour of Padma Bhushan, awarded by the Government of India.

== Early life ==
Pai was born in a Gaud Saraswat Brahmin family in Margão, Portuguese Goa, on 21 January 1926. His native family name was Pai Fondekar, also known as Sambari. He received his primary education at Damodar Vidyalaya and also completed the second grade in Portuguese at the Government School in Margao, before completing his matriculation at New Era High School.

His tryst with art began at his uncle Ramnath Mauzo's Mauzo Photo Studio in Margao at the age of 12 or 13, where he used to touch up black and white photographs with paint. In the 1940s, he was actively involved in the Goa liberation movement for which he was arrested thrice by the Portuguese colonials. He was beaten by the Portuguese police after being arrested. Following his matriculation, at the instigation of his uncle and the painter Dinanath Dalal, his parents sent him to the city of Bombay. There he studied at the Sir J. J. School of Art in Mumbai from 1943 to 1947. He was awarded the Mayo Medal in 1947. Pai offered a satyagraha outside the Margao Police Station in 1946.

== Career ==
Soon after completing his studies, Pai started teaching at the Sir J. J. School of Art. At the same time, he participated in the activities of the Bombay Progressive Artists' Group, although he did not become its member. Pai recalls that once, a nude painting by Francis Newton Souza was objected to by the then Chief Minister of Bombay State, Morarji Desai. Due to Pai's association with Souza, he was demoted. Pai wrote a letter about it to the Sir J. J. School of Art but was told to drop his accusations against the Director. He declined to do so and was expelled as a result.

Subsequently, he wrote to S. H. Raza who was then in Paris. Raza made arrangements for Pai's arrival in Paris. Pai moved to Paris in 1951, where he met other Indian painters and studied fresco and etching. With their encouragement, he held exhibitions of his paintings in the Rue de Lyon in London and in Paris in 1952. He studied at the prestigious École des Beaux-Arts and stayed in Paris for ten years. During his stay in Paris, Pai held ten solo exhibitions in the city.

Pai returned to India in 1953 and staged an exhibition in Delhi, followed by a show in Mumbai in 1954; however, his work did not receive a favourable response in India at the time, and he returned to Paris in 1954.

He had to his credit more than 110 one-man shows across the globe. Between 1954 and 1985, his solo exhibitions were held at London, Munich, Hanover, Stuttgart, New York City, Bremen, San Francisco, Bangkok, Kuala Lumpur, Singapore, New Delhi, Mumbai, Kolkata, Goa and São Paulo. Pai learnt Rosenthal porcelain art in Germany. He also participated in numerous Biennials in Paris, Tokyo, Sao Paulo.

Returning to India, he took up the post of the principal of the Goa College of Art in 1977 and served the institution until 1987. He was instrumental in creating the new college campus in Altinho area of Panaji.

== Works ==
From 1947 to 1950 Pai was largely inspired by Goan subjects and the concept of Indian miniatures. His initial works speak about the Goan way of life, as can be seen from his paintings depicting the 'Zambaulim Shigmo' or the process of feni-making. Pai was also inspired by ancient Egyptian sculptures. He listened to music when he painted. His favourites included Kumar Gandharv, Bhimsen Joshi and Kishori Amonkar. Pai painted various paintings based on different ragas of Indian classical music. In his works, he gives a visual interpretation to the moods of the music as determined by the vibrations of the notes. His painting series,'Musical Moods' (1965) was inspired by Indian classical ragas. Pai used to also play the sitar and the bansuri. His other subjects included Gita Govinda, the life of Mahatma Gandhi, the Ramayana, Gautama Buddha, and Ritusamhara.

His paintings are in the collection of Ben and Abby Grey Foundation, New York Public Library, Berlin Museum, Centre national des arts plastiques, Madras Museum, Nagpur Museum, National Gallery of Modern Art, New Delhi, and Punjab University Museum.

== Personal life ==
Pai married Purnima, whom he had met earlier in Shimla, at the age of 40. The couple had a son. His wife had predeceased him. The year 2025 marked the artist's birth centenary.

== Death ==
Pai died on 14 March 2021, at his home in Dona Paula in Goa. He was aged 95.

== Awards ==
- Lalit Kala Akademi award, three times (1961, 1963, 1972)
- Padma Shri awards, Government of India (1985)
- State Award of the Government of Goa
- Nehru Award (1995)
- Gomant Vibhushan Award, Goa's highest civilian award.
- Honoured by the Government of Goa, Daman and Diu (1983)
- Padma Bhushan

== See also ==
- Sadanand Bakre
- Syed Haider Raza
- Francis Newton Souza
- Akbar Padamsee
