= Voice of Freedom (radio station) =

Portuguese Indian underground radio station (1955–1961)

- Portuguese Goa (unlicensed); Portuguese India
- Broadcast area: Portuguese Goa
- Frequency: 7.13 MHz (42.05 m)

Programming
- Languages: Portuguese, Konkani, Marathi, English
- Format: News; Goan independence movement-related messaging

History
- First air date: 25 November 1955
- Last air date: 19 December 1961

Voice of Freedom (Portuguese: Voz da Liberdade; Konkani: Goenche Sadvonecho Awaz) was an underground radio station that transmitted across Portuguese Goa from 1955 to 1961, advocating the cause of the Goan independence movement. The station broadcast a variety of programming in English, Konkani, and in Portuguese, promoting Goan independence from Portuguese rule. Some of the broadcasters on the station included activists Nicolau Menezes, Libia Lobo and Vaman Sardesai.

== History ==
Voice of Freedom was established in November 1955 by a group of local activists, including Vaman Sardesai, Libia Lobo, and Nicolau Menezes, who aimed to challenge Portuguese rule in India and promote the idea of an independent Goa. Lobo and Sardesai were also among the station's announcers. To maintain secrecy, the station was also referred to as the 'Q station'. Operating from undisclosed locations, often in trucks and forests near Amboli surrounding Goa, organizers maintained anonymity to safeguard against potential reprisals. It is noted that while transmitting from these locations, the broadcasters often encountered venomous snakes, leeches, and other wildlife. Broadcast locations included areas near the present-day Maharashtra border near Sawantwadi and another near the Karnataka border near Castle Rock, and later near Belgaum. The Portuguese government attempted to block signals using jammers and deployed local smugglers to track down the broadcasting setup.

The station primarily used shortwave radio frequencies, allowing it to reach a broad audience, including remote areas of Goa and international sympathizers of the Goan independence cause. Broadcasts included news updates, political commentaries, discussions on the struggle for independence, and patriotic songs. The station played an important role in shaping public opinion against Portuguese rule, countering the official news broadcasts at a time when the major newspapers were heavily censored. Content also included updates on the Indian independence movement, discussions on the global context of decolonization, and calls for the Goans to join the struggle for their freedom. Broadcasts also covered updates on anti-colonial movements in Asia and Africa. In 1956, Indian activist Vinoba Bhave addressed the Goan population on the station.

The station ceased operations with its final broadcast on December 19, 1961 following India's annexation of Goa in a military campaign called Operation Vijay that ended Portuguese rule in Goa. Prior to the operation, the station carried a message from the Indian defence ministry to the Portuguese governor-general requesting the surrender of Portuguese troops. In one of its last broadcasts after the Indian annexation of Goa, the station's broadcasters flew in an airplane, sending out messages and dropping flyers to mark the event. A Portuguese government report on the station's operations was later discovered. Major Filipe de Barros Rodrigues of the Portuguese army wrote that the station had "assumed the command of the entire propaganda and maintained its aggressiveness and its militancy. [The station] threatens, criticises, persuades, explains, changes colours, alters perspectives but, in everything it says, it carries a sharp stiletto. [It was] the only voice which was hurting us [the Portuguese] at close range."
