= The Navhind Times =

Indian English-language daily newspaper

- 27 March 2018 front page of The Navhind Times
- Type: Daily newspaper
- Format: Broadsheet
- Owner: Dempo
- Publisher: Dempo
- Founded: 18 February 1963; 63 years ago
- Political alignment: Center-left
- Language: English
- Headquarters: Panaji, Goa
- Circulation: 56,000 (as of 2011)
- Website: www.navhindtimes.in

The Navhind Times is an English-language newspaper in Goa. Founded in 1963 and based in Panaji, the capital of Goa, it is the largest selling newspaper, amongst the three locally published English newspapers in the state. The other two being O Heraldo and Gomantak Times successively.

According to the newspaper, it has a 52% of overall share market of advertisement space in Goa.

== History ==
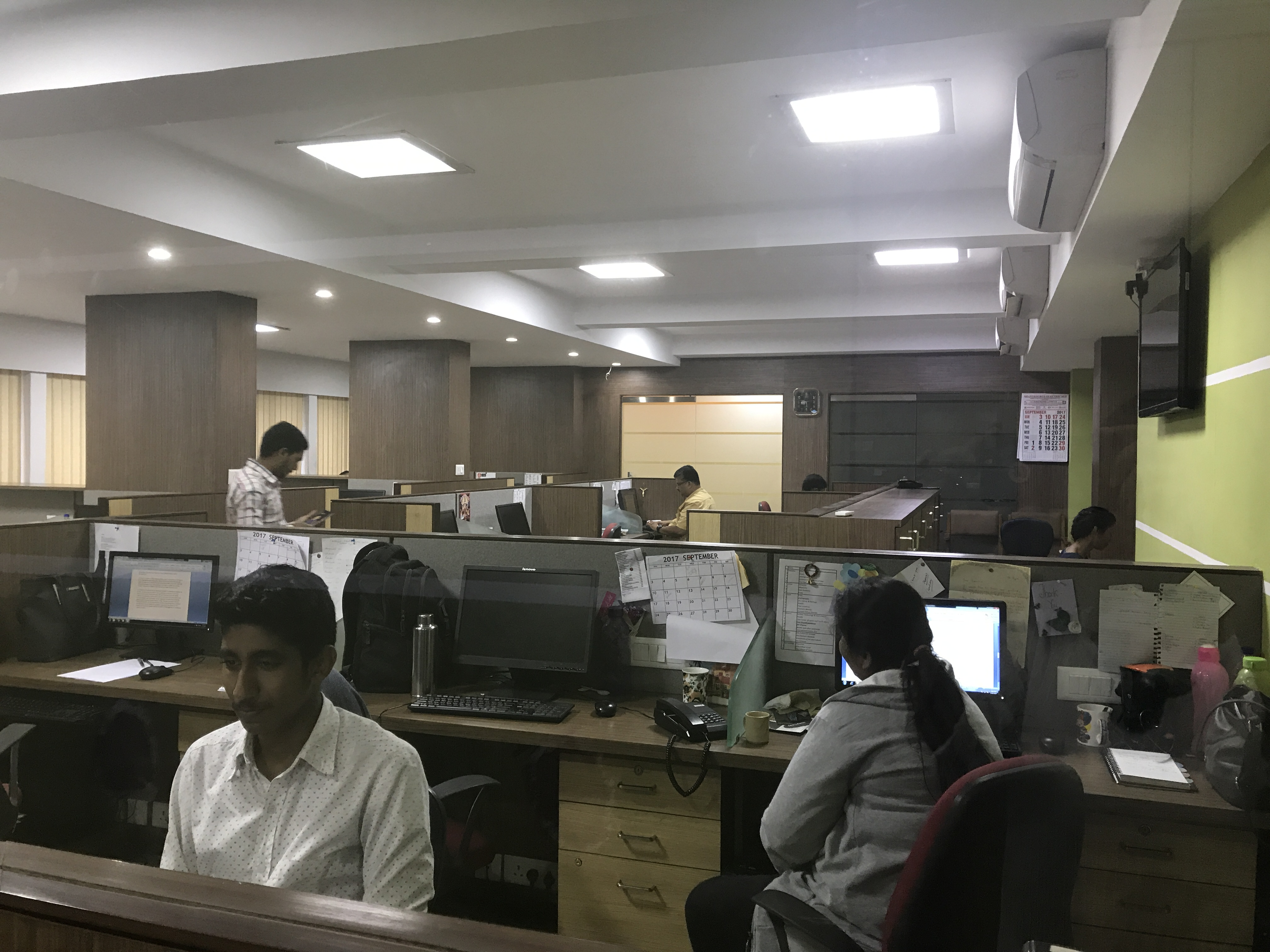
The NT office at Navhind Bhavan.

The Navhind Times was established on 18 February 1963, after India conquered the former Portuguese colony, it was Goa's first English newspaper, and was launched by the Dempo Brothers, including the elder Vasantarao Dempo. They were involved in mining business. The publication hired two editors Lambert Mascarenhas and T.V. Parvate. Mascarenhas remained its editor in early 1960s, before starting Goa Today magazine in 1966. He was awarded Gomant Vibhushan Award, the highest civilian award of Goa in 2014.

Until 1983, The Navhind Times was the sole English-language daily in Goa, till the Portuguese-language O Heraldo converted to being a broadsheet daily in English too on October 10, 1983.

In 1987, the Gomantak Times joined, as the third English-language daily in Goa. But it shut down in 2020, during the pandemic year, citing financial pressures. In the meanwhile, The Times of India, a major newspaper from Mumbai (Bombay), also started a Goa edition in the early 2000s. Likewise, another newspaper launched here was The Goan of the Timblo group.

== Editors ==
In 1965, The Navhind Times hired Dr. K S K Menon, of the Free Press Journal, Bombay, as its editor. Menon remained until 1981 when ideological differences with Vasantrao Dempo made him resign and join Deccan Herald in Bangalore. Known for his military demeanor and unbending respect for the truth, he had a plaque on his desk that said 'News not Views'.

Editors at the helm of The Navhind Times included Bikram Vohra, Padiyar, among others.

In May 1993 Arun Sinha took over as editor and had a long stint which lasted till the early 2020s.

In November 2021, Venkateswaran Narayanan was appointed editor, followed by Vijay S. de Souza in 2023.
