= Goa Today =

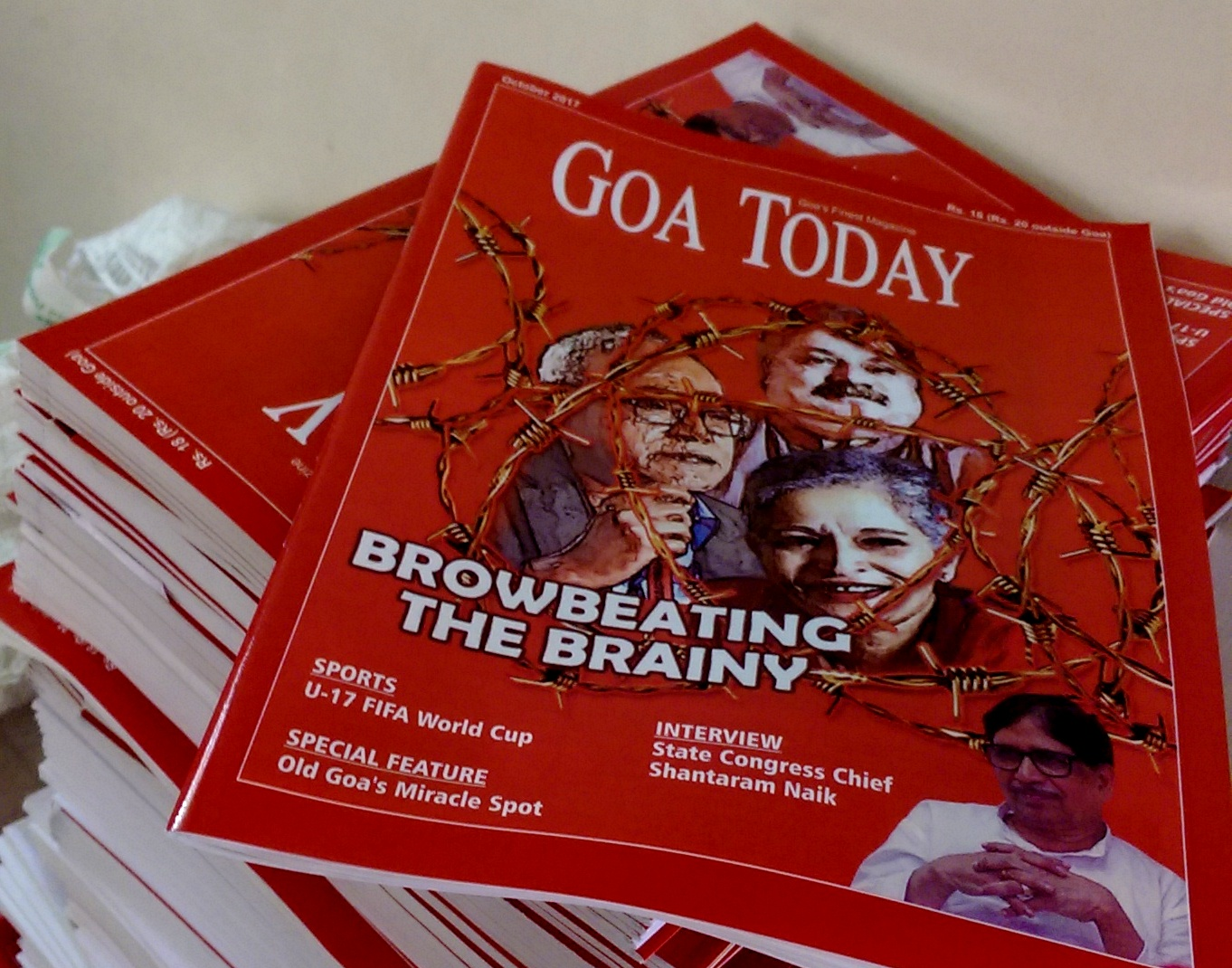
- Copies of the magazine
- Categories: Politics, culture
- Frequency: Monthly
- Founded: 1966
- First issue: 1966
- Final issue: 2021
- Country: India
- Based in: Panaji, Goa
- Language: English

Goa Today was an English monthly magazine published from Panaji, Goa, India, since 1966, featuring news, literature and local issues. Goa Today is considered the "grand-daddy" of all monthly magazines in Goa. It was founded by Francisco Damasceno do Rosario Dantas and former joint-editor of The Navhind Times, Lambert Mascarenhas. As of 2021, it has "paused" its publication.

== History ==
The main problem facing the magazine in the 2010s is fostering enough advertising to meet publication costs.

During Mascarenhas' and Dantas' ownership, Norman Dantas was first Associate editor and then as Executive editor for the magazine. When Goa Today was sold to Salgaocar Mining Industries, Mascarenhas was followed as editor by Vaman Sardesai, who left in 1987 to become India's ambassador to Angola. He was followed as editor by the poet-journalist Manohar Shetty, who maintained the high standards and promoted Goan literature while keeping the balance between history, political issues and literature. Vinayak Naik is the current editor.

In the mid 1980s, Goa Today was purchased by the Salgaocar Mining Industries, now part of the V. M. Salgaocar group of companies, which also own the Salgaocar Football Club of Goa.

The magazine's publication was "paused" in May 2021, citing declining sales due to digital news and the COVID-19 pandemic in India, with the hope of restoring publication in a different format in the future.
