= Amboli Ghat =

- Interactive map of Amboli Ghat

Third Approach
- Location: Maharashtra, India
- Range: Sahyadri
- Coordinates: 15.9555977°N 73.992472°E

Amboli Ghat is a mountain pass in the Sahyadri. The hill station of Amboli lies on this ghat. It is on the way from Kolhapur to Sawantwadi (via Amboli). This ghat receives heavy rainfall and is surrounded by thick forest, waterfalls and beautiful natural landscape. This ghat is one of the tourist attractions in Maharashtra.

== Deaths & accidents ==
On 31 July 2017, two travelers died after falling into a 2,000 feet deep valley in Amboli Ghat while trying to take a selfie.
