= Vinayak Khedekar =

Indian writer and folklorist (born 1938)

Vinayak Vishnu Khedekar
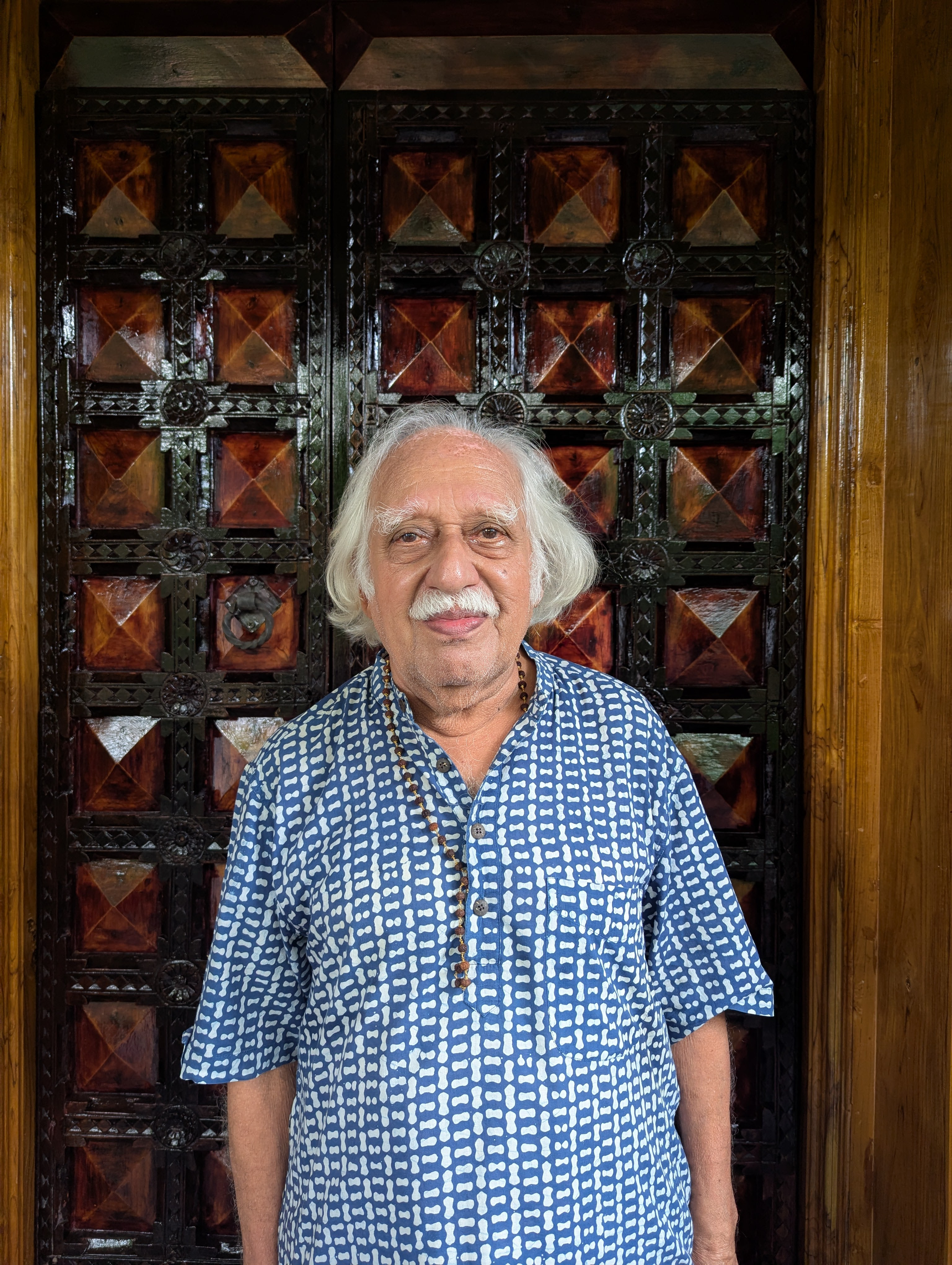
- Khedekar in 2026
- Born: 29 September 1938 (age 87); Savoi-Verem, Goa, Portuguese India
- Occupations: Writer; folklorist
- Spouse: Kunda Khedekar
- Children: 3
- Awards: Padma Shri (2021); Sangeet Natak Akademi Fellowship (2022); Gomant Vibhushan (2019–20)

Vinayak Vishnu Khedekar (born 29 September 1938) is an Indian writer and folklorist. He has made contributions to the preservation and promotion of Goa's cultural heritage. He received several awards, including the Padma Shri, Sangeet Natak Akademi Fellowship, Gomant Vibhushan, Dr. Komal Kothari Smriti (Lifetime Achievement) Lok Kala Puraskar, the Kala Akademi's Literary Award for his book Gomantakiya Loka Kala, and the State Award from the Government of Goa, and Government of Daman & Diu.

== Early life ==
Vinayak Vishnu Khedekar was born on 29 September 1938 in Savoi-Verem, Portuguese Goa. Born into a Brahmin priestly family, he served as a Hindu priest in the 1950s. His family's livelihood was farming on small, irrigated lands and serving as priests in rural households.

Khedekar did not attend school or receive formal education, however, he learned to read and write from his sister. Through the Gurukula system, he studied Sanskrit, Vedas, astrology, sacrificial rites, and priesthood. He later became proficient in Marathi, Konkani, English, Sanskrit, and Portuguese. He was interested in folk literature and folk culture since his childhood. He learned singing and kirtan from Balubua Abhishekhi, the father of Pandit Jitendra Abhisheki, and performed kirtans in many parts of Goa and Carwar, then part of British Raj.

=== Personal life ===
His wife is Kunda. The couple have a son and two daughters. They now live in Ribandar, Goa.

== Career ==
Khedekar was a mentor to the Kala Academy, Goa and later served as its member secretary for 23 years.

During his service at the Academy, he played a crucial role in identifying, presenting and popularizing the rural and tribal folk art forms of Goa. Due to his special interest in the fields of folk literature, folk culture and drama, he successfully implemented many activities in the academy. He has implemented various programmes showcasing the diverse cultural heritage of Goa, including Bhajans, Kirtans and contemporary art forms.

Many innovative initiatives, festivals and celebrations in various fields like music, dance, drama, western music and visual arts came to fruition in Goa through his idea. During his time, the Goa Kala Akademi organized the Folk Literature Conference of the Folk Literature Research Board. He introduced the independent concept of 'Lokaveda'. Other notable programmes like Swarganda, Drums of Goa, Lok Rang, Goniche Khel, Gomant Darshan and Sangeetsav are also his contribution.

Khedekar also served on the advisory panel for folk art and puppetry of Indian Council for Cultural Relations, for the India Festival held in the Soviet Union.

== Contributions ==
=== Indian culture ===
Khedekar promoted the revival of Indian culture and folk culture in Goa, which was affected by the Portuguese rule. His efforts in basic research, field studies and restoration of indigenous art forms, on Goan culture are notable. One of his notable achievements is the restoration of the original Goan earthen lamp, the Divaj.

He worked on documenting the Chitra Kathi tradition and Kalsutri puppets of Sindhudurg district of Konkan and achieving national recognition for these folk arts.

Khedekar documented the folk art forms of Goa such as Shigmo, Dhalo, Dahikalo, Deknni, Jagar etc. He worked on the documentation of folk instruments in the states of Maharashtra, Goa, Daman Diu, Gujarat and Rajasthan in collaboration with the Western Region Cultural Centre, Udaipur, Government of India and the Sangeet Natak Akademi, Government of India. Similarly, he promoted field research on folk culture and folk arts in Goa. He played a valuable role in organizing exhibitions of Indian folk arts by touring countries like the US and Russia.

He received a scholarship from the Ministry of Human Resource Development, Government of India.

Khedekar has actively participated in various committees and activities of organizations like the Indian Council for Cultural Relations, Sangeet Natak Akademi, National School of Drama, Indira Gandhi National Institute of Arts and many others.

=== Journalism ===
Khedekar worked as a journalist for the Marathi newspapers like Gomantak, The Navhind Times, Loksatta, and the Kesari, and was also the Goa correspondent for news agencies Samachar Bharati and Hindustan Samachar. He also wrote columns in various Marathi magazines.

=== Author ===
He has written a total of 18 books in Marathi, English and Konkani. Most of the books are about the folk culture, folk art and folk literature of Goa. He has also written three plays. In addition, audio films like Gomantak Ganesh, Gumat Utsav, and Kshetra Sangeet were created from his ideas.

After retirement, Khedekar traveled throughout Goa, leading to the publication of his most notable work, Goa: Life, Land and Legacy.

== Awards and honors ==
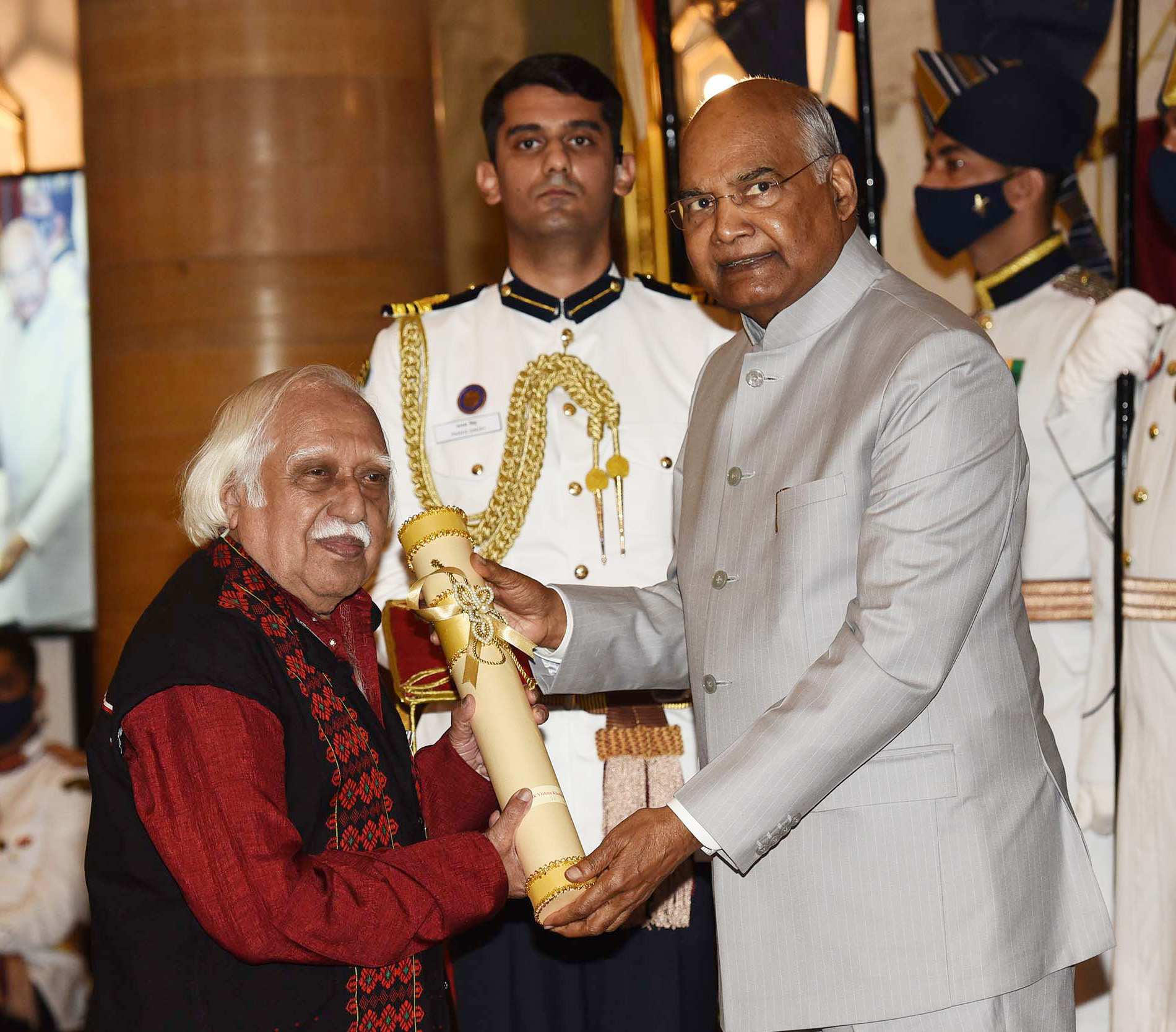
The President, Shri Ram Nath Kovind presenting the Padma Shri Award to Shri Vinayak Vishnu Khedekar, at the Civil Investiture Ceremony-IV, at Rashtrapati Bhavan, in New Delhi on November 09, 2021.

Khedekar has received several awards, including the Kala Akademi's Literary Award for his book Gomantakiya Loka Kala, and the State Award from the Government of Goa, and Government of Daman & Diu, Mahakavi Kalidas Award and Rang Samman Award.

In 2021, Khedekar was awarded the Padma Shri, the fourth-highest civilian award of the Republic of India. In the same year he also received the Dr.Komal Kothari Smriti (Life Time Achievement) Lok Kala Puraskar nstituted by the West Zone Cultural Centre, Udaipur. In 2022 he was elected a Fellow of the Sangeet Natak Akademi for his contributions to Indian music. In 2023, he was awarded Gomant Vibhushan, Goa government's highest civilian award, for the year 2019–20.
