= Gomant Vibhushan =

Highest civilian award in Goa, India

- Civilian award for exceptional work in any field
- Awarded for: Highest civilian honour of Goa
- Sponsored by: Government of Goa
- Reward: ₹5 lakh (US$5,300)
- First award: 2010
- Final award: 2021-22

Highlights
- Total awarded: 8
- First winner: Anil Kakodkar
- Last winner: Prabhakar Karekar

Gomant Vibhushan Award is the highest civilian honour of the State of Goa. It is given annually by Government of Goa to people of Goan origin for exceptional work in any field.

The award was established by Goa Directorate of Art and Culture, Government of Goa. It is presented by the Governor of Goa at a public function, and carries a memento, which is a glass-encased traditional brass lamp, a citation and ₹ 5 lakhs, as a monetary award.

== Awardees ==
Year	Name	Image	Field	Ref.
2009-2010	Anil Kakodkar		Science	
2011	Charles Correa		Architecture	
2012-2013	Raghunath Anant Mashelkar		Science	
2014	Lambert Mascarenhas		Journalism	
2016	Laxman Pai		Art	
2018	Dr. Premanand Ramani		Medicine	
2019-20	Vinayak Khedekar		Folk Art	
2021-22	Prabhakar Karekar		Music	
