= Menezes Braganza House =

Heritage house in Goa, India

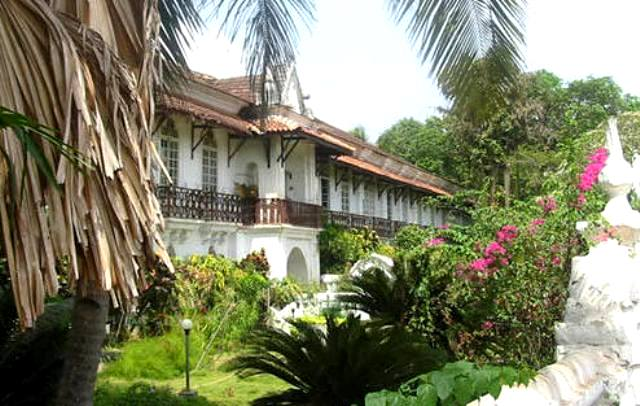
- Menezes Braganza House at Chandor, Goa
- Interactive map of the Menezes Braganza House area

General information
- Location: Chandor, Goa, India
- Coordinates: 15°15′42″N 74°02′36″E

The Menezes Braganza House, also known as the Braganza Pereira House, the Menezes Braganza Pereira House, or simply as the Braganza House, is a 17th-century Portuguese-style mansion in Chandor, South Goa. It stretches along one side of the village square and is one of the largest colonial-period residences in Goa.

== History ==
Family records indicate the land was granted in 1576 to Francisco Xavier e Braganza by King Dom Luís of Portugal. The original structure dates to the late 16th century, with significant extensions added in the 17th and 19th centuries. In the 19th century the house was divided between two sisters: the western wing became the Menezes Braganza property, and the eastern wing passed to the Pereira Braganza branch.

During Portuguese rule, the estate’s assets were managed as the Casa Sociedade de Braganza.

== Architecture ==
Constructed primarily of local laterite, the mansion’s long whitewashed façade features 24 large sash windows and a central stuccoed balcony. The exterior was originally cream but later repainted white to align with the convention reserving ecclesiastical colours for places of worship.

An internal courtyard lies at the centre of the plan, surrounded by verandahs. The 16th-century block includes the western salon and two master bedrooms; later wings enclose a visitor’s salon, study, library, ballroom and dining room.

== Interiors and collections ==
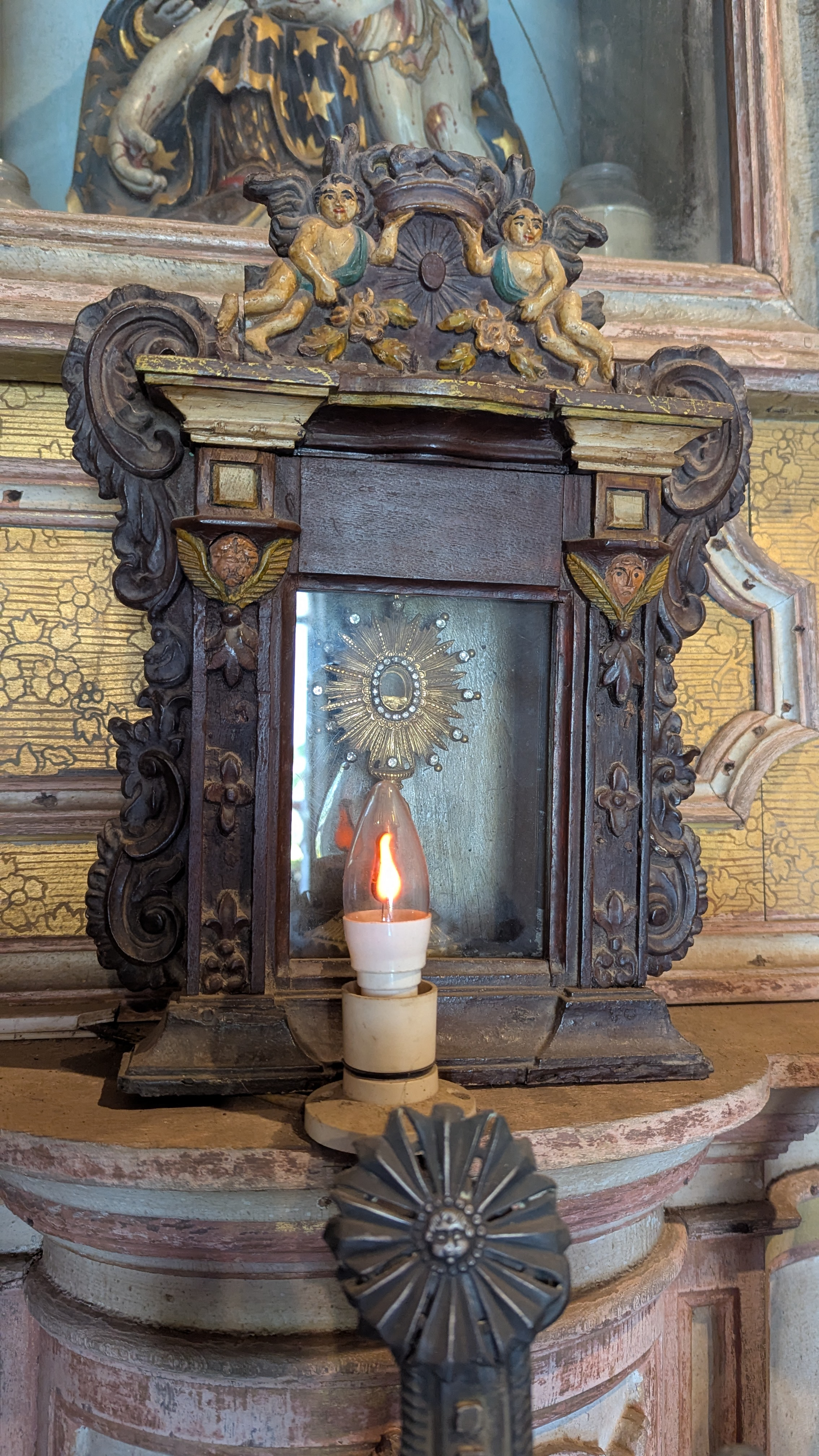
Relic of St Francis Xavier at the chapel at the Menezes Braganza House

- Salon and flooring: Portuguese ceramic tiles in the visitor’s salon; Flemish oak in the library; Italian marble in the ballroom.
- Chandeliers: Crystal fixtures from Venice and Belgium.
- Porcelain and curios: Macao porcelain, a ceremonial coconut from the Seychelles and two large vases reputedly owned by St Francis Xavier.
- Windows: Some with Venetian stained glass; others inlaid with local oyster shell.

A private chapel in the eastern wing houses a fingernail relic of St Francis Xavier.

== Library ==
The house contains Goa’s largest private library, with over 5,000 leather-bound volumes in English, Latin, French and Portuguese, collected by journalist and activist Luís de Menezes Braganza.

Teak and rosewood cupboards, the wood of which was harvested from family lands, hold encyclopaedias, medical and legal treatises, histories and 18th- and 19th-century fiction.

== Cultural significance ==
Luís de Menezes Braganza used the mansion as a centre for political discussion, publishing O Heraldo and later O Debate from its salons. His brother-in-law, Tristão de Bragança Cunha, sheltered here during political unrest in 1946 and later founded the Goa Congress Committee.

After the liberation of Goa in 1961, the house was neglected until a descendant initiated restoration in 1983. In 2005 a trust was established to oversee conservation.

The house is the subject of the 1999 Portuguese-language documentary A Dama de Chandor, directed by Catarina Mourão.

== Notable members ==
Notable members of the house are:

- T. B. Cunha
- Luís de Menezes Bragança
- Berta de Menezes Bragança
- Beatris de Menezes Bragança
