= C. P. Ramachandran =

Indian journalist

- Born: Chittenippaattu Puthenveettil Ramachandran; 1923; Burma
- Died: 15 April 1997; Parli-I, Palakkad
- Occupation: Journalist
- Spouse: Jalabala (divorced)

C. P. Ramachandran (1923 – 15 April 1997) was an Indian journalist and political activist. He worked in the Army and in the Navy as an officer, before becoming a journalist working in Shankar's Weekly, the Patriot and then the Hindustan Times, all in Delhi. In 1986, he returned to his native village Parli I in Palakkad district.

== Early life ==
Ramachandran was born in Burma to Malayali parents, Alath Krishnan Nair from Mannur in Palakkad District and Chittenippattu Puthenveettil Janaki Amma, from Ottapalam, Kerala, India. After a short period in Burma, Ramachandran spent his boyhood in Ottapalam. His education was in Ottapalam and Government Victoria College, Palakkad. After his intermediate schooling, he joined the Royal Navy as a mid-ship man. During the Naval Mutiny in 1946, he was under surveillance by the Intelligence Department, as he had a strong Communist Party background prior to his Naval life. After leaving the Navy he worked in the Army for two years in Ahammed Nagar. Finishing his military life, he returned home in 1948, the year after independence, and became active in the Party once again. All his party works were centred in Ottapalam. When the Party was banned, Ramachandran was arrested and sent to Kannur Central Jail. After his release set out to Bombay whilst the police watched him continuously. In 1952 he was called by A. K. Gopalan and immediately started working for Goplan's election campaign.

== Career ==
In 1953, following the instructions of E. M. S. Namboodiripad, Ramachandran went to Delhi to join the Party newspaper Crossroads, which later became New Age, and began his career as a journalist. Until 1955, Ramachandran was a reporter with the paper. When he had some disagreements with the basic ideas of his Party, he started to write his views in Shankar's Weekly under the name 'Agastya'. Although Namboodiripad warned him, Ramachandran was not prepared to compromise, resulting in his expulsion from the Party along with Edathatta Narayan and Aruna Asaf Ali. He then joined Shankar's Weekly as assistant editor. His columns, entitled 'Man Of The Week' and 'Free Thinking', were popular. He met Jalabala Vaidya, then a trainee reporter and now the famous theatre actress, and in 1958 they got married. Ramachandran's marriage lasted six years as they obtained a mutual divorce in 1964, after fathering two children Jai and Anasuya. In 1960 Ramachandran joined The Hindustan Times as Parliament Correspondent. His column 'Last Week in Parliament' was much discussed. When B. G. Verghese was fired from the paper in 1974, Ramachandran filed a suit against Birla who was the owner of the newspaper. It became a notable chapter in the history of Indian Journalism. In 1986 Ramachandran retired from Hindustan Times as deputy editor.

== Death ==
He never wished to remain in Delhi, where he had lived most of his life as an intellectual and a journalist, so he went back to his mother in Parli-I, Palakkad, and was with her when she died. Ramachandran lived his last 11 years in Parli till he died on 15 April 1997. His daughter Anasuya and son Jai were with him in his last moments.

The book titled 'C. P. Ramachandran-Dialogues, Memories and Essays' (സി.പി.രാമചന്ദ്രന്‍-സംഭാഷണം,സ്മരണ, ലേഖനങ്ങള്‍) edited by noted Malayalam critic Reghunathan Parali and published by Kerala Press Academy, Kakkanad is a valuable work in Malayalam that compiles and throws light into the life and thoughts of the veteran journalist. The book consists of a prolonged conversation and writings by C P Ramachandran and many other writings on him by noted writers and journalists who had direct experience with him.
