= Palekar =

Palekar is a Marathi surname. Notable people with this surname include:

- Allahudien Palekar (born 1978), a South African cricket umpire
- Amol Palekar (born 1944), an Indian actor, director, and singer
- Narayan Palekar (born before 1954 – died 2006), an Indian freedom fighter
- Shiv Palekar (fl. 2015 – present), an Indian-Australian actor
- Subhash Palekar (born 1949), an Indian agriculturalist
