= Narayan Palekar =

Indian independence activist and politician (1927–2006)

- Born: Narayan Vithal Palekar; 23 July 1927; Dramapur, Portuguese Goa
- Died: 25 July 2006 (aged 79); Goa Velha, Goa, India
- Political party: Communist Party of India
- Other political affiliations: Goan Peoples Party
- Movement: Goan independence movement
- Children: 3

Narayan Palekar (23 July 1927 – 25 July 2006) was an Indian independence activist who participated in the Goan independence movement and was leader of the Communist Party of India. He was the president of the Goa state council of the All India Trade Union Congress (AITUC). He was one of the founding members of the Goan Peoples Party, of which some members later formed the CPI along with George Vaz and S. A. Dange in Goa.

== Early life ==
Narayan Vithal Palekar was born on 23 July 1927 to Vithal Narayan Palekar in Dramapur, Salcete taluka, Portuguese Goa. He completed his Master of Arts and LLB.

== Nationalist movement ==
In 1946, Palekar and Vishwanath Lawande formed a small group in Goa Velha that sang patriotic songs and powadas. While organizing a meeting on 18 November 1946 at Maine, Goa Velha, Palekar was jailed for about three weeks without trial.

From 1945 to 1947, he was a member of M. N. Roy's Radical Democratic Party in Goa. Between 1947 and 1948, he joined the party in Bombay. While in Goa, he joined T. B. Cunha's Goan Youth League in 1946 and was part of the National Congress, Goa, between 1946 and 1948.

Between 1948 and 1961, Palekar was part of the Goan Peoples Party (GPP). He became a Secretariat member between 1948 and 1954 and then became its general secretary between 1954 and 1960.

In 1954, Palekar, along with Mario Rodrigues and George Vaz, led volunteers of the GPP to capture more than 60 villages in Nagar Haveli. This was before annexation by the volunteers and commandos of the Azad Gomantak Dal. An arrest warrant was issued against Palekar and he was tried in his absence for this.

Palekar published the GPP's publication, Goan Age, for eight years, along with Gerald Pereira. He worked to shift the GPP's headquarters to Belgaum some time in 1954, and then became its general secretary.

Palekar would secretly visit Goa to help organise protests and guide nationalists. In the 1954 satyagraha, led by V.K. Chitale, Palekar was put in charge of the Goa Vimochan Sahayak Samiti.

He was a member of the Goa Action Council that led efforts to end Portuguese colonies in India. During the events of Operation Vijay, he organised a citizens' committee to help create public support for the army men at the border. On 18 December 1961, he entered Goa along with the army men.

== Post-annexation of Goa ==
Palekar later became a member of the Communist Party of India's National Council and was its general secretary in Goa. While he was working as a government employee in Bombay, between 1948 and 1964, he worked as a trade unionist and CPI worker after 1954.

Palekar contested elections from the South Goa Lok Sabha constituency as a candidate of the CPI in 1989, 1991 and 1999 but did not win.

== Personal life ==
Palekar had three children, a son and two daughters.

== Death ==
Palekar died after a brief illness on 25 July 2006.

== Awards and accolades ==
Palekar was awarded a scroll of honour by the administration of Nagar Haveli.

== See also ==
- George Vaz
- Gerald Pereira
