= Boletim do Instituto Vasco da Gama =

19th-century Portuguese monthly review

The Boletim do Instituto Vasco da Gama was the official monthly review of the Instituto Vasco da Gama, which was founded in Goa in 1871 by Tomás António Ribeiro Ferreira, better known as Tomás Ribeiro.

== The Instituto Vasco da Gama ==
The Instituto Vasco da Gama was the first initiative to promote and support science and letters in Goa. It was provided with a building for its headquarters and financial support for publishing a monthly review bearing the institute's name. Renovated in 1924, the Instituto Vasco da Gama promoted a golden age of Indo-Portuguese literature in the areas of scholarly writing, journalism, history and poetry. After the liberation of Goa and its incorporation into India, the Institute was renamed Instituto Menezes Bragança in honour of the journalist and Indian nationalist Luís de Menezes Bragança. The Boletim do Instituto Vasco da Gama was also renamed Boletim do Instituto Menezes Bragança.

== Publication details ==
The review was published by Tipografia Rangel, Bastora, Goa, beginning with vol. 1 (1926) and going up to vol. 78 (1960).

== Holdings ==
- The Biblioteca Geral da Universidade de Coimbra possesses what appears to be a complete set. This collection is available in digital form at Memorias de Africa.
- Central Library, Panjim, Goa.
- Xavier Centre for Historical Research, Alto Porvorim, Goa possesses the following issues: 1926-1961. The issues seem to be badly damaged, and so are not easily given out.
