= Berta de Menezes Bragança =

Indian journalist (1911–1993)

- Born: Maria Berta de Menezes Bragança; 17 December 1911; Cuelim, Portuguese Goa
- Died: 13 July 1993 (aged 81)
- Resting place: Chandor Church cemetery
- Notable work: Tales of Goa (1990)
- Political party: Communist Party of India
- Other political affiliations: Goan People's Party; Frente Popular
- Movement: Goan independence movement
- Spouse: António Furtado (m. 1947; died 1988)
- Father: Luís de Menezes Bragança
- Relatives: Beatris de Menezes Bragança (sister); T. B. Cunha (uncle)

Maria Berta de Menezes Bragança (Note: alternatively spelled as Berta de Menezes Braganza and Bertha Menezes Braganza) (17 December 1911 – 13 July 1993) was an Indian independence activist, teacher, writer and journalist. She was a peace worker, teacher, youth activist and has been credited for being the person behind the Free Goa bulletin.

== Early and personal life ==
Beatriz Braganza and Bertha Braganza (center) along with her sister Beatriz (left) and uncle T. B. Cunha (right)

Maria Berta de Menezes Bragança was born on 17 December 1911 in Cuelim village in Mormugao taluka. She was educated at home by her parents. She and her sister Beatris were daughters of Luís de Menezes Bragança and Ana, the sister of Tristão de Bragança Cunha. The family lived at the Menezes Braganza House.

Berta was also a teacher. She married António Furtado, a lawyer, in 1947. He died in 1988. The family lived at the Menezes Braganza House.

Her sister, Dr Beatriz de Menezes Bragança, born on 6 November 1916 who died on 24 May 1983, had done her M.Sc. and Ph.D. and took an active part in the anti-Portuguese campaigns, meetings and demonstrations in Bombay, in the run-up to the end of Portuguese rule in Goa. Beatriz was a youth leader who led a procession to the Portuguese Consulate in Bombay in 1946, to protest against the arrest of Tristão de Bragança Cunha.

== Goan independence movement ==
"The Menezes Bragança sisters, Beatriz and Berta, were involved in the freedom struggle of Goa, which is not surprising given the fact that their father Luis de Menezes Bragança was a great Goan nationalist," writes historian Fátima da Silva Gracias.

Since 1929, Menezes Bragança was part of the Goa committee of the Goa Congress Committee (GCC), briefly affiliated to the Indian National Congress, and actively worked to enroll members. She later joined her uncle T.B. Cunha's Goa Youth League (GYL) and in 1945, she was chosen as the Secretary of its Goa unit.

She was often seen at the side of Cunha at protests and speeches in South Goa. Some of their meetings would be held at the Menezes Braganza House in Chandor. She and her sister, Beatris, wore khadi saris and promoted the adoption of khadi fabric.

Between 1940 and 1943, she contributed to the Panjim-based publication, O Académico.

In her capacity as Secretary of the GYL, in response to Ram Manohar Lohia's call to freedom on Goa Revolution Day, she and Cunha attempted to offer satyagraha at Margao on 30 June 1946. However, the Portuguese police stopped them and beat her, following which the police abandoned them on the roadside in Chandor.

Between 1946 and 1950, she continued the distribution of nationalist pamphlets and Indian newspapers in Goa. However, on 16 April 1950, she and her husband, António Furtado, were forced to escape to Belgaum, after she was threatened with deportation to Africa. This was because they both refused to sign an official declaration that condemned then Prime Minister of India Jawaharlal Nehru's declaration that Goa was a part of India and must be returned to it.

Menezes Bragança continued her distribution of nationalist propaganda from Belgaum. In 1952, she was chosen as the President of the Belgaum branch of the National Congress (Goa). Later, in 1953, she and Furtado founded the fortnightly left-wing publication, Free Goa. Subtitled as the "Organ of Portuguese India’s Liberation", Furtado was its first editor. With Cunha's escape to Bombay in 1956, she and Furtado moved there, continuing the publication from there. Cunha also contributed to Free Goa. Menezes Bragança then became its editor in 1958, after the death of Cunha. She continued editing it until it stopped publication in 1962.

In 1955, she participated in the mass satyagraha at Patradevi that was organised by Gerald Pereira and the Goa Vimochan Sahayak Samiti (GVSS). While in Bombay, she joined the Goan People's Party (GPP).

She was chosen to represent India at the Afro-Asian Women's Conference in Cairo, during which the problem of Goa's freedom was discussed in detail. The official biographies of freedom-fighters published by the post-1961 regime says she "was a member of the Indian delegation to the Afro-Asian Women's Conference in Cairo where the 'Goa Problem' evoked a special interest and importance". She was also part of a delegation to Moscow meant to attract attention to the same issue, along with the Goan independence movement. In 1959, she was a member of the Goa Political Convention at the Afro-Asian Solidarity and All India Peace Council. She was also a regular contributor to the Afro-Asian Bulletin.

In December 1960, the third National Conference for Afro-Asian solidarity took place in Bombay, calling for the immediate freedom of Goa, Daman and Diu and forming a National Campaign Committee for this purpose. In 1961, Menezes Bragança joined this committee, which was led by George Vaz. In this capacity, she travelled across India, participating in conferences in major cities like Bombay, Ahmedabad, Calcutta and Delhi, demanding military action for Goa's freedom.

== Post-annexation of Goa ==
Menezes Bragança and other Goan Communists, like Gerald Pereira and George Vaz, began working with the Goan peasants soon after the Indian annexation of Goa, forming the Shetkari Paksh (Farmers' Party). In the 1963 Goa, Daman and Diu Legislative Assembly election, they did not contest with their Communist symbols but instead contested as a political front, the Frente Popular. This was done in an attempt to avoid the anti-Communist sentiment among the electorate in those times. Menezes Bragança contested from the Cortalim Assembly constituency but neither her nor the seven others were able to win any seats.

Menezes Bragança later became the President of the Communist Party of India in Goa. She was also a part of the Institute Menezes Braganza, named after her father.

In 1990, she published a book of fiction, titled Tales of Goa, collecting 15 short stories that she had previously published in the 1930s in The Bombay Chronicle and Blitz newspapers.

In 1992, she published, Landmarks in My Time: Selected Writings, which has considerable writings about her uncle, T. B. Cunha.

She donated 1,000 square metres (0.25 acres) of land to the Chandor Sports Club, upon which the village's community centre was constructed.

== Death ==
Menezes Bragança died in 1993. While she was cremated, her ashes are buried in the Chandor cemetery.

== Works ==
- Tales of Goa (Bastora: Tipografia Rangel: 1991)
- Landmarks in My Time: Selected Writings (1992)
