= Aruna Asaf Ali =

Indian independence activist (1909–1996)

Bharat Ratna Aruna Asaf Ali
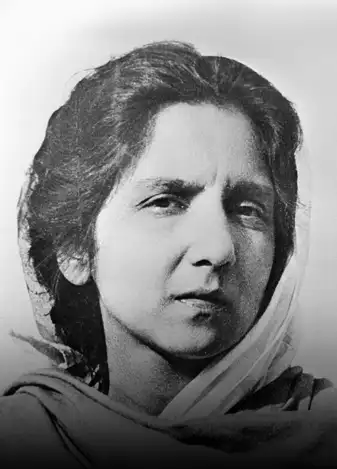
- Born: Aruna Ganguly; 16 July 1909; Kalka, Punjab, India
- Died: 29 July 1996 (aged 87); New Delhi, India
- Education: Sacred Heart Convent
- Occupations: Political activist; educator; publisher
- Political party: Communist Party of India
- Other political affiliations: Indian National Congress
- Spouse: Asaf Ali (m. 1928; died 1953)
- Father: Upendranath Ganguli
- Awards: International Lenin Peace Prize (1964); Jawaharlal Nehru Prize (1991); Padma Vibhushan (1992); Bharat Ratna (1997)

Aruna Asaf Ali (née Ganguly) (Bengali pronunciation: [oruɳa]; 16 July 1909 – 29 July 1996) was an Indian educator, political activist, and publisher. An active participant in the Indian independence movement, she is widely remembered for hoisting the Indian National flag at the Gowalia Tank Maidan, Bombay during the Quit India Movement in 1942. Post-independence, she remained active in politics, becoming Delhi's first mayor. She was a recipient of the Bharat Ratna, India's highest civilian honour in 1997.

== Early life ==
Aruna Asaf Ali was born on 16 July 1909 in Kalka, Punjab, British India (now in Haryana, India) into a Bengali Brahmin family. Her father Upendranath Ganguly hailed from Barisal District of Eastern Bengal (now Bangladesh) but settled in the United Province. He was a restaurant owner. Her mother Ambalika Devi was the daughter of Trailokyanath Sanyal, a renowned Brahmo leader who wrote many Brahmo hymns. Upendranath Ganguly's younger brother Dhirendranath Ganguly (DG) was one of the earliest film directors. Another brother, Nagendranath, was a university professor who married Nobel Prize winner Rabindranath Tagore's only surviving daughter Mira Devi. Aruna's sister Purnima Banerjee was a member of the Constituent Assembly of India.

Aruna was educated at Sacred Heart Convent in Lahore and then at All Saints' College in Nainital. After her graduation, she worked as a teacher at the Gokhale Memorial School in Calcutta. She met Asaf Ali, a leader in the Indian National Congress, in Allahabad. They got married in 1928, despite parental opposition on grounds of religion and age (he was a Muslim and her senior by more than 20 years).

My father was no more when Asaf and I married in September 1928. My paternal uncle Nagendranath Ganguly, a university professor who regarded himself as my guardian, said to relatives and friends that as far as he was concerned I was dead and he had performed my shraddh.

== Life and career ==
=== Contribution to the Indian independence movement ===
Aruna Asaf Ali had a major role in the Indian independence Movement. She became a member of Indian National Congress after marrying Asaf Ali and participated in public processions during the Salt Satyagraha. She was arrested at the age of 21 on the charge that she was a vagrant and hence not released in 1931 under the Gandhi–Irwin Pact which stipulated the release of all political prisoners. Other women co-prisoners refused to leave the premises unless she was released and gave in only after Mahatma Gandhi intervened. A public agitation secured her release.

In 1932, she was held prisoner at the Tihar Jail where she protested the indifferent treatment of political prisoners by launching a hunger strike. Her efforts improved conditions in the Tihar Jail but she was moved to Ambala and subjected to solitary confinement. She was politically not very active after her release, but at the end of 1942, she took part in the underground movement.

=== Rise to prominence during the Quit India movement ===
On 8 August 1942, the All India Congress Committee passed the Quit India resolution at the Bombay session. The government responded by arresting the major leaders and all members of the Congress Working Committee and thus tried to pre-empt the movement from success. Young Aruna Asaf Ali presided over the remainder of the session on 9 August and hoisted the Congress flag at the Gowalia Tank Maidan. This marked the commencement of the movement. The police fired upon the assembly at the session. Aruna was dubbed the Queen of the 1942 movement for her bravery in the face of danger and was called Grand Old Lady of the Independence movement in her later years. Despite the absence of direct leadership, spontaneous protests and demonstrations were held all over the country, as an expression of the desire of India's youth to achieve independence.

An arrest warrant was issued in her name but she went underground to evade the arrest and started an underground movement in the year 1942. Her property was seized and sold. In the meanwhile, she also edited Inquilab, a monthly magazine of the Congress Party, along with Ram Manohar Lohia. In a 1944 issue, she exhorted the youth to action by asking them to forget futile discussions about violence and non-violence and join the revolution. Leaders such as Jayaprakash Narayan and Aruna Asaf Ali were described as "the Political children of Gandhi but recent students of Karl Marx." The government announced a reward of 5,000 rupees for her capture.

She fell ill and was for a period hiding in Dr Joshi's Hospital in Karol Bagh in Delhi. Mahatma Gandhi sent her a hand-written note to her to come out of hiding and surrender herself – as her mission was accomplished and as she could utilize the reward amount for the Harijan cause. However, she came out of hiding only after the warrant against her was withdrawn in 1946. She treasured the note from the Mahatma and it adorned her drawing room. However, she also faced criticism from Gandhi for her support of the Royal Indian Navy mutiny, a movement she saw as the single greatest unifying factor of Hindus and Muslims at a time that was the peak of the movement for Pakistan.

=== Post-Independence and mayorship ===
She was a member of the Congress Socialist Party, a caucus within the Congress Party for activists with socialist leanings. Disillusioned with the progress of the Congress Party on socialism she joined a new party, Socialist Party in 1948. She, however, left that party along with Edatata Narayanan and they visited Moscow along with Rajani Palme Dutt. Both of them joined the Communist Party of India in the early 1950s. On the personal front, she was bereaved when Asaf Ali died in 1953.

In 1954, she helped form the National Federation of Indian Women, the women's wing of CPI but left the party in 1956 following Nikita Khrushchev's disowning of Stalin. In 1958, she was elected the first Mayor of Delhi. She was closely associated with social activists and secularists of her era like Krishna Menon, Vimla Kapoor, Guru Radha Kishan, Premsagar Gupta, Rajani Palme Joti, Sarla Sharma and Subhadra Joshi for social welfare and development in Delhi.

=== Goa liberation movement ===
In December 1960, she was part of a delegation that met with then Home Minister of India Pandit Pant in New Delhi, urging the Indian government to take action for the freedom of Goa. Others in the delegation were Eclito D’Souza, Irene Heredia, Vishwanath Lawande, Lambert Mascarenhas, George Vaz and Bertha Braganza.

=== Career in publishing ===
She and Narayanan started Link publishing house and published a daily newspaper, Patriot and a weekly, Link the same year. The publications became prestigious due to the patronage of leaders such as Jawaharlal Nehru, Krishna Menon and Biju Patnaik. Later she moved out of the publishing house due to internal politics, stunned by greed taking over the creed of her comrades. Despite reservations about the emergency, she remained close to Indira Gandhi and Rajiv Gandhi.

She wrote a book called Ideas of A Nation, which was later also published by Penguin in their Words of Freedom series to commemorate the sixtieth anniversary of India's independence.

=== Death ===
She died in New Delhi on 29 July 1996, aged 87.

== Legacy ==
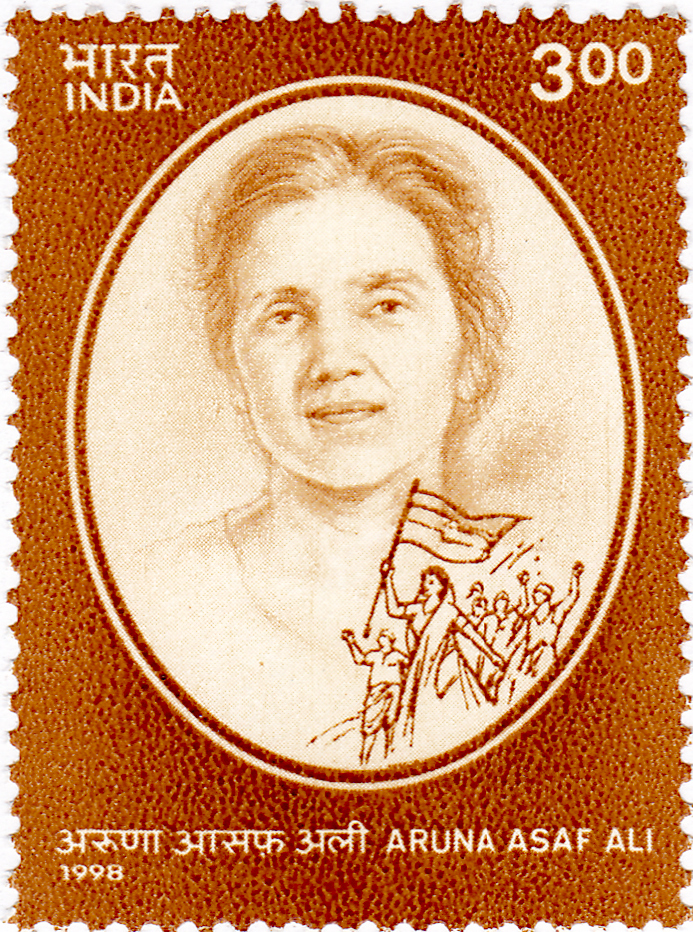
Commemoration stamp, 1998

Aruna Asaf Ali was awarded International Lenin Peace Prize in the year 1964 and the Jawaharlal Nehru Award for International Understanding in 1991. She was awarded India's second highest civilian honour, the Padma Vibhushan in her lifetime in 1992, and finally the highest civilian award, the Bharat Ratna, posthumously in 1997. In 1998, a stamp commemorating her was issued. Aruna Asaf Ali Marg in New Delhi was named in her honour. All India Minorities Front distributes the Dr Aruna Asaf Ali Sadbhawana Award annually. There is also a government hospital in New Delhi named in her honour, the Aruna Asaf Ali Govt. Hospital (AAAGH).
