= Gopal Sharman =

Indian playwright (1935–2016)

- Born: 19 August 1935; Calcutta, India
- Died: 16 June 2016 (aged 80); New Delhi, India
- Occupations: Playwright; poet; journalist
- Known for: English play based on the Ramayana
- Spouse: Jalabala Vaidya
- Children: 2

Gopal Sharman (19 August 1935 – 16 June 2016) was an Indian playwright known for his dramatic English version of The Ramayana, which has been presented on stage more than 2,000 times. His Akshara Theatre is a hub of cultural activity in New Delhi and is studied by architecture students.

== Early life and career ==
Born in Calcutta, India, on 19 August 1935, Gopal was the sixth child of Buddhidhan Sharman, a medical doctor, and his wife Savitri. Both parents were Sanskrit scholars and fought for India's independence from British rule.

Sharman started his working life as a journalist in Lucknow and Calcutta but shifted to Delhi in 1958, where he began writing on the performing arts for several major Indian newspapers. He later moved to London where he wrote on the arts for The Times and The Sunday Times. His book on Indian music, Filigree in Sound, was published in London by André Deutsch. He also wrote columns for The Washington Post in the United States.

== Theatrical career ==
He rose to prominence as a playwright and director with his very first production, Full Circle, a collection of stories and poems performed by his actress wife, Jalabala Vaidya. The production was of contemporary India, mixing together poverty, classical Indian thought, comic asides, and cobweb-shrouded government departments.

Full Circle had its London premiere at the Mercury Theatre. The Sunday Times hailed Sharman as a "new major poet" and said of Jalabala Vaidya: "she performs exquisitely." The Guardian described Sharman as "a Renaissance man who would leave any Medici panting well in the rear'".

The Royal Shakespeare Company invited him to bring a play to its World Theatre Season. Sharman returned to India to write his dramatic, contemporary version of the 5,000-year-old Indian epic Ramayana in English. The four-act play retells the epic story from a contemporary viewpoint, but without any loss of reverence.

Sharman's version of The Ramayana is widely acclaimed in India, with more than 2,000 performances to date. It has played on London's West End; on Broadway and at the United Nations Headquarters in New York City; at the Smithsonian Institution in Washington, D.C.; the National Theatres of Finland and Canada — even in the Bahamas and the Fiji Islands — and in more cities and towns in India than any other theatrical production since after Independence.

When The Ramayana played in New York, The New York Times hailed Sharman's play as "India's Gift to Broadway" On the U.S. West Coast, poet Gene Detro wrote in Portland's The Oregon Journal: "Both poet playwright Gopal Sharman and his actress wife Jalabala Vaidya are possessed of genius … Sharman's script fuses poetic power with the pacing of a very fine film editor".

== The Akshara Theatre ==
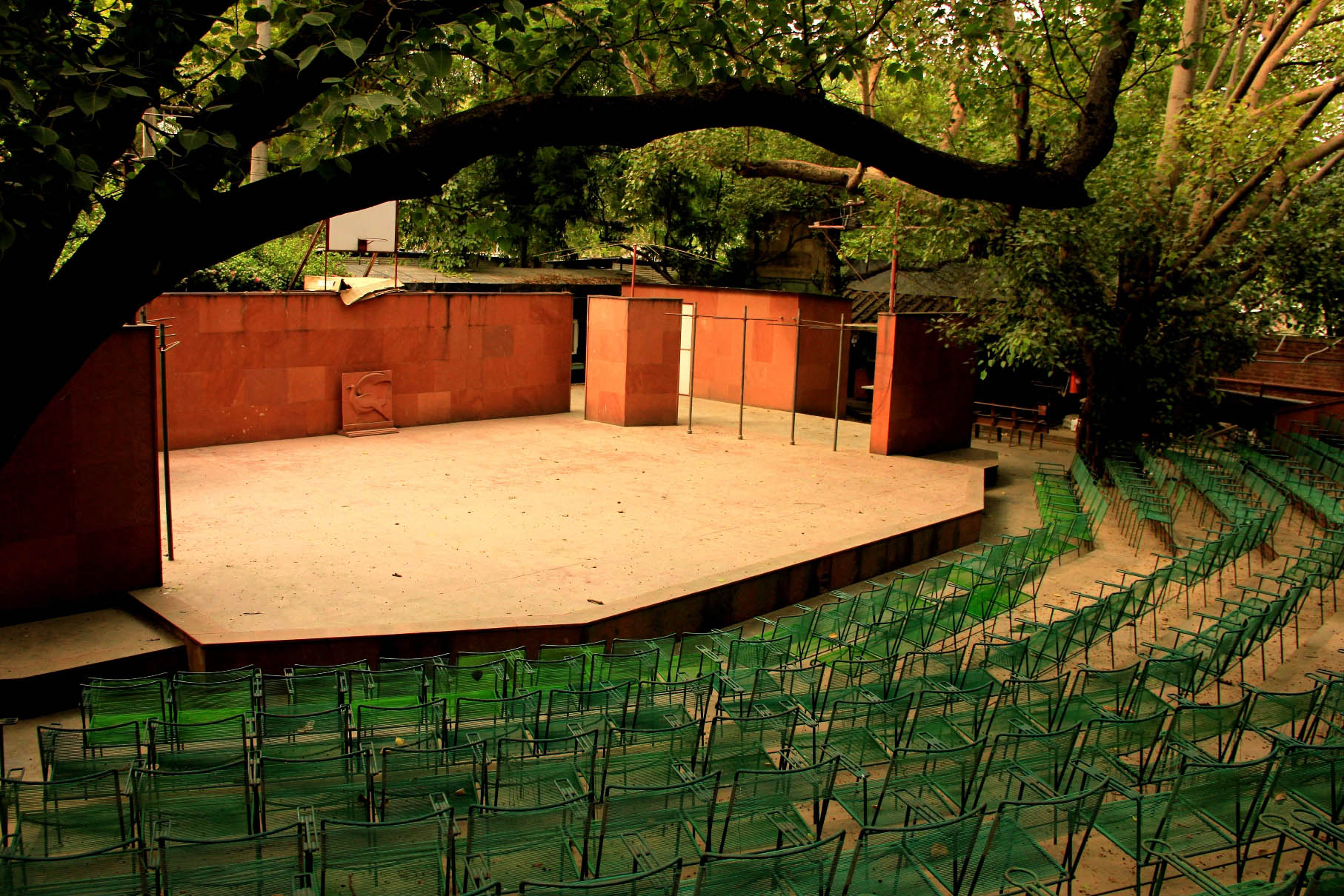
The Akshara Outdoor Pipal Tree Theatre created by Sharman

Sharman created an arts complex in the Lutyens Bungalow Zone in New Delhi called the Akshara National Classical Theatre. He designed and built it himself, using his own stone carvings as embellishments. The complex houses three theatres, television production studios and a gallery. The couple also worked and lived there.

== Television work ==
Sharman made a series of television programmes and documentaries from the mid-1980s. These include the India Alive series, The Kashmir Story, The Sufi Way, Music Alive and My Life Is My Song, all telecast nationally. His 11-part series India was shown on the American PBS network.

== Works ==
Sharmam's plays include:

- Alice & Humpty Dumpty
- The Bhagavad Gita
- Full Circle
- I, Galileo Galilei
- In Goethe's Magical World
- India Alive
- Jeevan Geet
- Karma
- Larflarflarf
- Let's Laugh Again
- The Ramayana
- This and That

His television work includes:

- Kathanjali, a five-part series based on his own stories as well as Tagore's Gitanjali and The Kabuliwala
- India Alive, a 31-part series
- The Kashmir Story, a two-and-a-half-hour documentary
- Music Alive, an eight-part series
- My Life Is My Song, his musical documentary
- Sufi Way, a six-part series

Sharman wrote four books:

- Filigree in Sound on Indian music, published by Andre Deutsch of London
- The Ramayana, the epic as a play in English, published by Bharatiya Vidya Bhavan
- Don’t Miss It, the story of the Akshara Theatre's beginnings, published by the Akshara Press
- Karma, an Upanishadic musical, published by the Akshara Press
