= George Vaz =

Indian politician (1919–1999)

- Born: 14 July 1919; Bombay, British India
- Died: 1999 (aged 79–80)
- Political party: Communist Party of India
- Other political affiliations: Goan Peoples Party; Frente Popular
- Movement: Goan independence movement

George Vaz (14 July 1919 – 1999) was an Indian independence activist, trade unionist and politician.

== Early life ==
George Vaz was born on 14 July 1919 in Bombay to Sebastião Xavier Vaz.

== Goan independence movement ==
Vaz was associated with the Goan Youth League, which was founded by T. B. Cunha.

Vaz was greatly inspired by Ram Manohar Lohia and the events of Goa Revolution Day. He described Lohia's inspiration to Goan independence activists in these words: "18th June was like a big Light House that guided many ships traveling in the sea."

In 1946, he was chosen as a member of the executive committee of the GCC. On 28 October 1946, he was arrested after he attempted to deliver a speech in Sanquelim, following which he was imprisoned and then left across the border of Portuguese Goa on 19 November that year. On 15 December, he was arrested once again for attempting to enter Goa. On 12 February 1947, he was tried by the TMT and fined and imprisoned for three months.

Vaz then moved to Bombay, working for the Goa liberation movement from there. He hosted public meetings and published flyers against the Portuguese government. Between 1948 and 1949, he was chosen as the Secretary of the Socialist group of the National Congress, Goa. He then co-founded the Goan People's Party (GPP) and was its General Secretary from 1949 onwards.

Vaz was an active Leftist and was also the Secretary of the Goa Action Committee. He was chosen as a member of the panel of minorities that had been appointed by the Samyukta Maharashtra Samiti. He was also associated with the Bombay Youth League and was a participant at the International Youth Rally, that was held outside India.

Vaz was also the Art Director of several films, such as Lal Batti. He also worked on nationalistic posters that were present at the meetings and conferences of freedom fighters.

In 1954, Vaz was one of the leaders of the GPP that worked together to capture more than 60 villages in Nagar Haveli. This was before its complete Liberation by the volunteers and commandos of the Azad Gomantak Dal.

In December 1960, Vaz was part of a delegation that met with then Home Minister of India Pandit Pant in New Delhi, urging the Indian government to take action for the freedom of Goa. Others in the delegation were Eclito D’Souza, Irene Heredia, Vishwanath Lawande, Lambert Mascarenhas, Aruna Asaf Ali and Bertha Braganza.

Also in December 1960, the third National Conference for Afro-Asian solidarity took place in Bombay, calling for the immediate freedom of Goa, Daman and Diu and forming a National Campaign Committee for this purpose. In April 1961, Vaz and Cajetan Lobo, both secretaries of the National Campaign Committee, took part in a three-day Conference of Nationalist Organisations of the Portuguese Colonies at Casablanca, Morocco. The participants of the conference deliberated on the political problems of the Portuguese colonies in Africa and India. Pundalik Gaitonde also attended the conference with them.

== Post-annexation of Goa ==
Vaz was a prominent Communist trade union leader, having led multiple workers' protests and strikes in both Goa and Bombay. He was a member of the National Council of the Communist Party of India. He was also the General Secretary of All India Trade Union Congress in Goa and was a member of its national Executive Committee.

Vaz and other Goan Communists, like Gerald Pereira and Berta de Menezes Bragança, began working with the Goan peasants soon after the Indian annexation of Goa, forming the Shetkari Paksh (Farmers' Party). In the 1963 Goa, Daman and Diu Legislative Assembly election, they did not contest with their Communist symbols but instead contested as a political front, the Frente Popular. This was done to not attract the attention of the Goan Catholic Church, who considered the Communists as a threat. Vaz contested from the Tivim Assembly constituency but neither him nor the seven others were able to win any seats.

Vaz also contested in the 1967 Goa, Daman and Diu Legislative Assembly election but did not win.

Vaz contested elections from the South Goa Lok Sabha constituency as a candidate of the CPI in 1984 but did not win.

== Death ==
Vaz died in 1999.

== Accolades ==
On 18 June 1982, Vaz was honoured by the Government of Goa, Daman and Diu.
