= Azad Maidan (public square) =

Public square in Panaji, Goa

- India
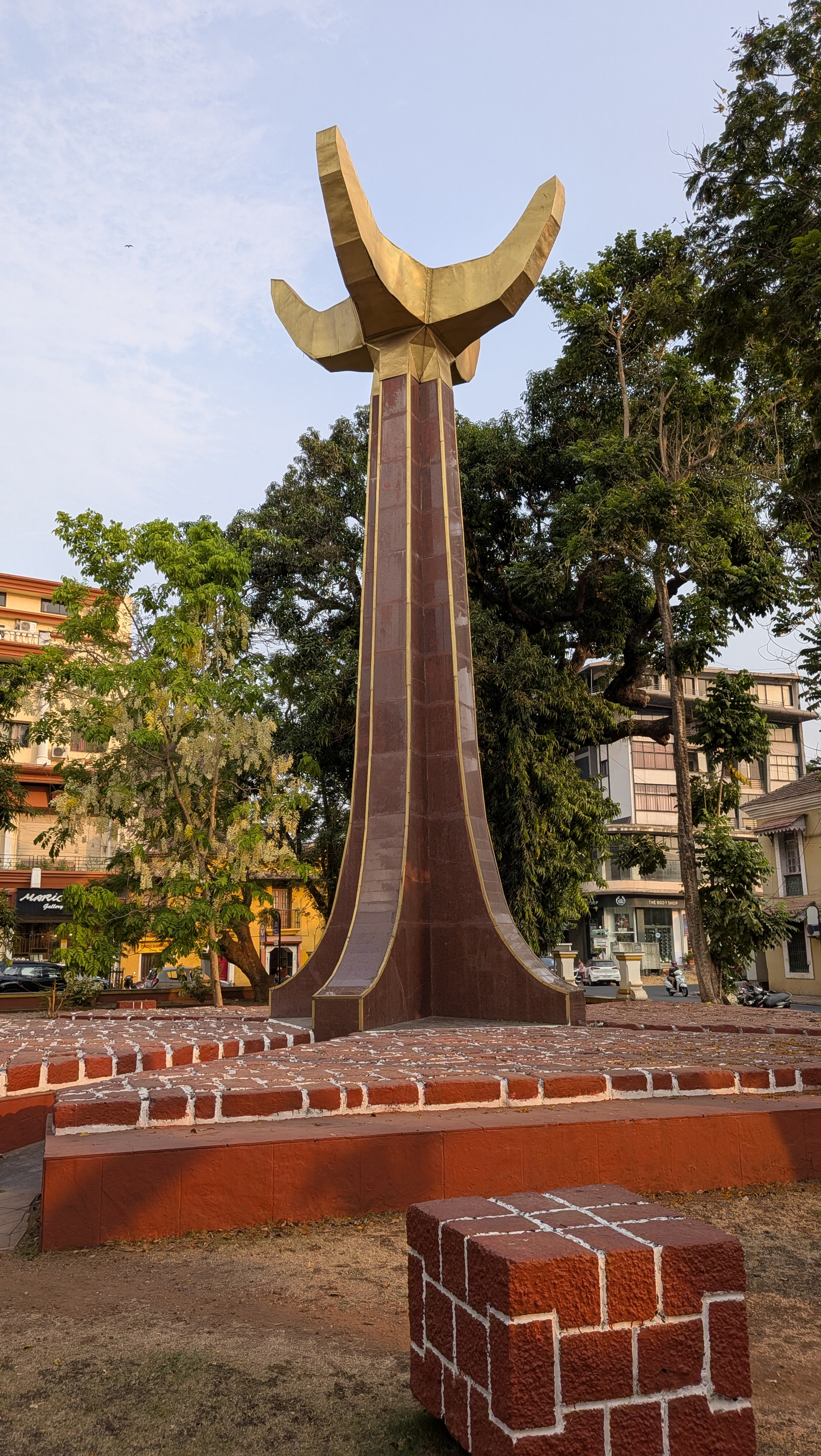
- Martyrs' Memorial at Azad Maidan in 2026
- For Annexation of Goa
- Unveiled: 23 March 1973
- Location: Panaji, Goa, India

Azad Maidan (formerly Square of the Seven Windows; Portuguese: Praça de Sete Janelas) is a public square in the Indian state of Panaji, Goa. It is located opposite the Goa Police headquarters on the Mahatma Gandhi Road, Panaji. It is located at 15°30′0″N 73°49′34″E.

== History ==
Originally built only as a public square, it was known as the Praça de Sete Janelas (Square of the Seven Windows). The name was derived from the Goa Police headquarters building, which has seven windows each to its either ends and the entrance. The building originally had a ground floor and three sets of seven windows each on the first floor.

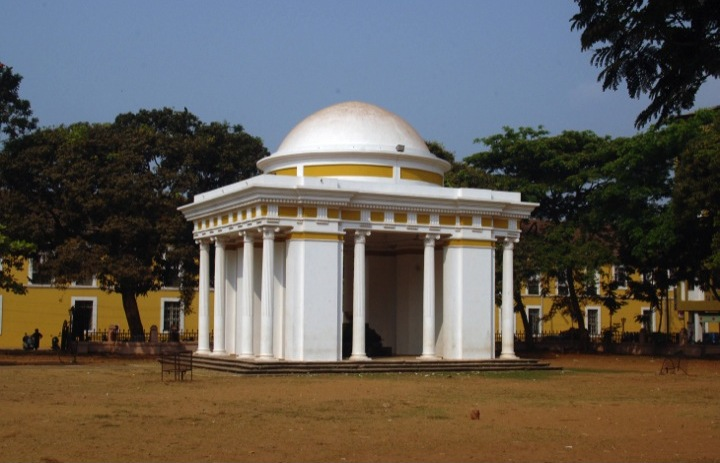
Domed structure at Azad Maidan

In 1843, a statue of the Portuguese general Afonso de Albuquerque was laid inside the domed structure at the Azad Maidan. The iron beams and granite pillars for the monuments were brought from the Convent of S. Domingos, Velha Goa. The pillars and columns for the dome came from the College of St. Thomas Aquinas, located on a hillock of Conceição. After Albuquerque's statue was installed, the square came to be known as Praça Afonso de Albuquerque.

== Post-annexation of Goa ==
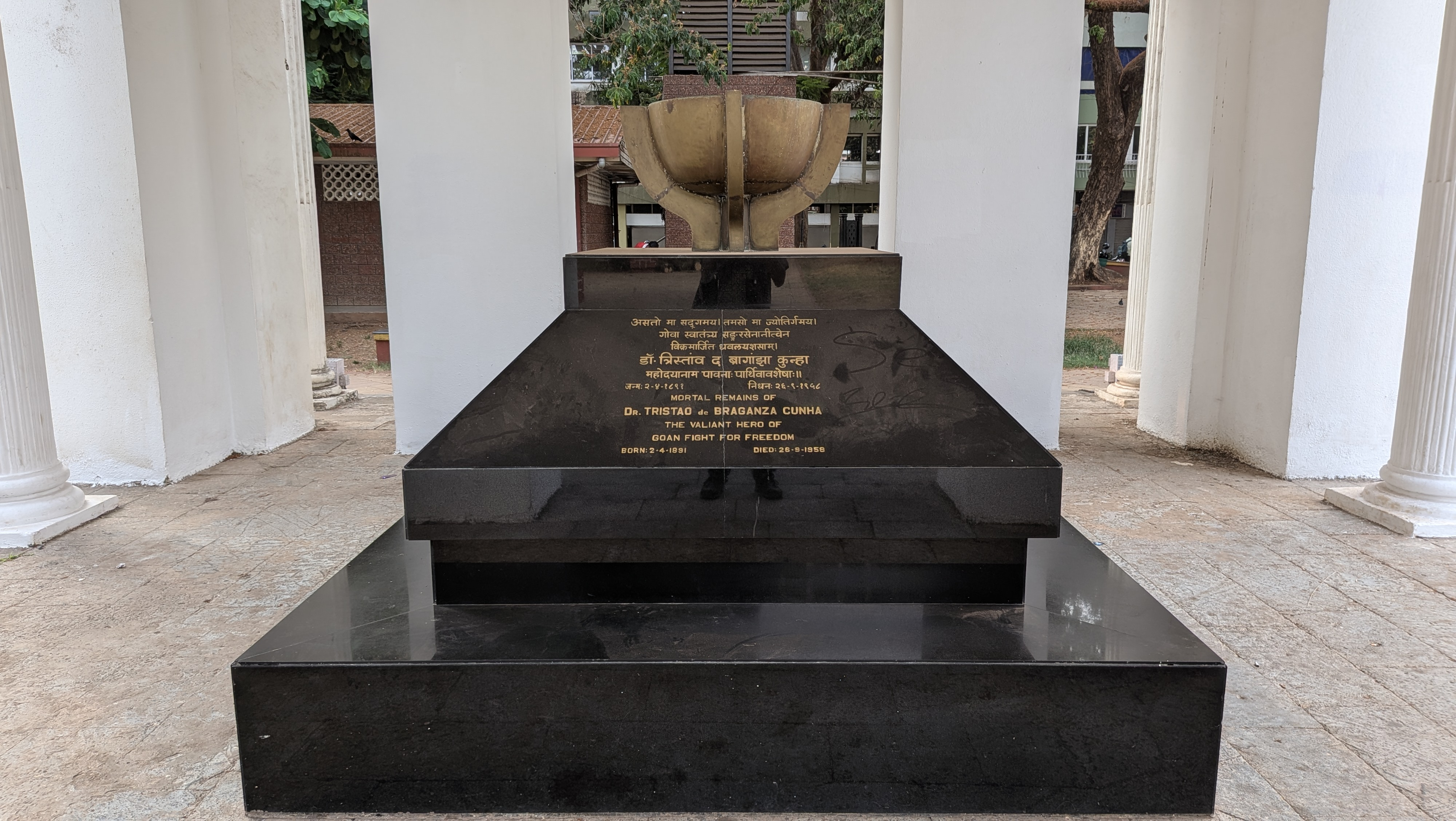
Mortal remains of T. B. Cunha at Azad Maidan in 2026

After the Indian annexation of Goa in 1961, the statue of Portuguese general Afonso de Albuquerque was removed from the domed pedestal by a mob of Marathi immigrants in the city. Albuquerque's statue was transferred to the Archaeological Survey of India Museum at Old Goa. A brass urn containing the mortal remains of Goan nationalist T. B. Cunha was subsequently installed in its place.

=== Martyrs' Memorial ===
A martyrs' memorial was built at Azad Maidan by the Freedom Fighters' Association with public donations, in memory of those who died in the Goan independence movement. The memorial is a tall structure with a crest displaying a four-armed structure. The four-armed structure has a pyramid between and atop these arms. The four-armed structure acknowledges the participation of freedom fighters from the four corners of India in the independence movement, while the pyramid structure indicates ashes, indicating the sacrifice of these freedom fighters.

The memorial was unveiled on 23 March 1973 by Lieutenant general Kunhiraman Palat Candeth, who had led the Indian Armed Forces' annexation of Goa in December 1961. A stanza composed by the poet Balakrishna Bhagwant Borkar has been etched on the memorial as follows:

धन्य लोहिया, धन्य भूमी ही
धन्य तिचे पुत्र
धन्य तयाचा त्याग देखते 
जनतेचे नेत्र

which translated as "Fortunate are the eyes, which saw the sacrifices of its brave sons, brave Ram Manohar Lohia for its lands". On the either side of this monument are two rectangular pillars which display the name of 67 freedom fighters of the Goa liberation movement.

Every year on national days, dignitaries pay homage by laying a wreath at the memorial and observing silence.

== The Maidan today ==
In the modern times, Azad Maidan has become a melting pot for Goans, where different opinions were voiced and issues discussed openly.

The grounds are used for holding meetings and protests.
