= Purnima Banerjee =

Indian politician

- Born: Purnima Ganguly; 1911; Kalka, Punjab
- Died: 1951 (aged 39–40); Nainital, India
- Occupations: Indian independence activist, member of the Constituent Assembly of India
- Political party: Indian National Congress
- Relatives: Aruna Asaf Ali (sister); Dhirendranath Ganguly (uncle); Trailokyanath Sanyal (grand-father)

Purnima Banerjee (née Ganguly, 1911-1951) was an Indian anti-colonial nationalist and a member of the Constituent Assembly of India from 1946 to 1950.

== Early life and career ==
She was the younger sister of independence activist and educator Aruna Asaf Ali. Their father Upendranath Ganguly was a restaurant owner who hailed from Barisal District of Eastern Bengal (now Bangladesh) but settled in United Provinces. Her mother Ambalika Devi was the daughter of Brahmo scholar Trailokyanath Sanyal who wrote many Brahmo hymns. Upendranath Ganguly's younger brother Dhirendranath Ganguly (DG) was one of the earliest film directors. Another brother, Nagendranath, was a university professor who married Rabindranath Tagore's only surviving daughter Mira Devi.

As secretary of the Indian National Congress committee in Allahabad, she was responsible for engaging and organizing trade unions, kisan meetings and work towards greater rural engagement. She took part in the Salt March and the Quit India Movement and was subsequently imprisoned. Later, she became a member of the Uttar Pradesh Legislative Assembly and of the Constituent Assembly of India.

== Death ==
Suffering from ill-health, she died prematurely in Nainital in 1951, a few years after the independence of India.
