= Jalabala Vaidya =

Indian stage actress (1936–2023)

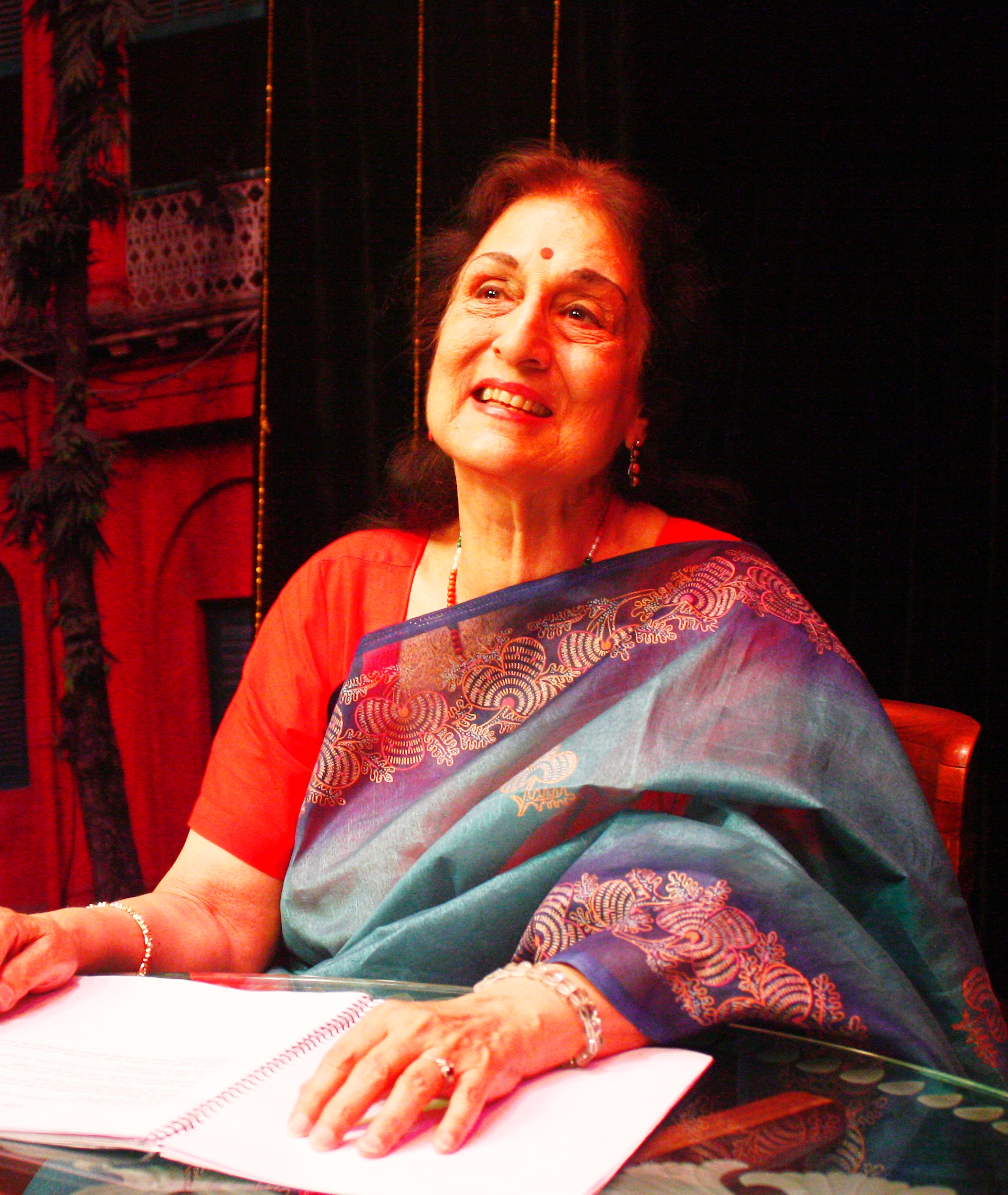
- Born: Jalabala Vaidya; 12 August 1936; London, England
- Died: 9 April 2023 (aged 86)
- Known for: Acting and writing

Jalabala Vaidya (12 August 1936 – 9 April 2023) was an Indian stage actress. She was best known for her one-woman performance of The Ramayana which is her husband, Gopal Sharman's contemporary dramatic interpretation of the Sanskrit epic. This Ramayana, subtitled 'the epic; as a play in English' is the only Indian production to this day to have played on Broadway. Jalabala Vaidya, Gopal Sharman and their daughter Anasuya Vaidya, are the founders and directors of The Akshara Theatre – non-profit arts institution in New Delhi, India.

== The Ramayana ==
The Ramayana has been performed by Jalabala more than 2000 times to rave reviews all over the world – including on Broadway in New York; at the Smithsonian Institution in Washington DC; at the Sadler's Wells Theatre, one of Britain's National Theatres in London; at the National Theatres of Canada and Finland; and at numerous other prestigious venues, like the United Nations Headquarters in New York, where it received a standing ovation. It has been received by superlative critical notices, both in India and abroad. Jalabala portrayed all 22 characters in the powerful two-hour performance.

In India, Akshara Theatre's productions including the Raymana , have toured extensively across the country. The company has performed at major venues such as the Music Academy in Chennai, the Tata Theatre at the National Centre for the Performing Arts in Mumbai, and the Siri Fort Auditorium in New Delhi, as well as in cities including Patiala, Amristar, Kolkata, and Kottayam. Their performances have also taken place in schools, colleges, and industrial sites.

Sumati Gangopadhyay writing for the Indian Express, Baroda, said: “Watching Jalabala’s impassioned enactment of Gopal's script has been the experience of a lifetime. Indeed, this is more than a stage show. It falls into the category of a revelatory experience. Strangely, mystically, this Ramayana suddenly brings you to a moment of truth—and you are left stunned. No one with any interest in the arts, or even his or her own salvation, can afford to miss this play.”

== Early life and career ==
Jalabala was born in London, England, the daughter of a half English-half Italian mother, Madge, a concert singer, and Indian journalist, author and independence activist, Suresh Vaidya. She began school at St.Paul's, London then at Queen Mary High School, Mumbai. She graduated from Miranda House, Delhi University with an English Honours Degree standing third in the University where she was also actively involved in theatre. Vaidya began her career as a journalist at Link Magazine in New Delhi . While She was working with Shanker's weekly she met CP Ramachandran (C. P. Ramachandran), a communist Intellectual from Parli, Palghat, Kerala and a highly accomplished Journalist then who enjoyed close friendship with the then Prime Minister Jawaharlal Nehru, Indira Gandhi etc . Jalabala Vaidya and CP Ramachandran got married in 1958 and they have a daughter named Anasooya and a son named Jai. But the relationship ran into rough weather and they mutually divorced in 1964. She then married Gopal Sharman who, at the time, worked there as an art critic.

Vaidya's first international theatrical success came in Rome at the Teatro Goldoni where she performed Full Circle written by Gopal Sharman who was also present at the reading. The duo soon embarked on a series of successful theatrical seasons on London’s West End, and performance tours all over Europe. The British MP and columnist for The Sunday Times, Tom Driberg, said of Jalabala: “She performs exquisitely.” The critic of The Times, London was equally ecstatic and likened her to Isadora Duncan.

Jalabala Vaidya also produced, performed in and narrated most of her husband’s highly acclaimed television films. To name some for which she is best known: India Alive, The Kashmir Story, The Sufi Way, Gitanjali and Gandhi’s Gita a play about Mahatma Gandhi’s translation of the Bhagavad Gita into simple Gujarati and how he and his wife Kasturba went through the final revision in the Himalayan foothills.

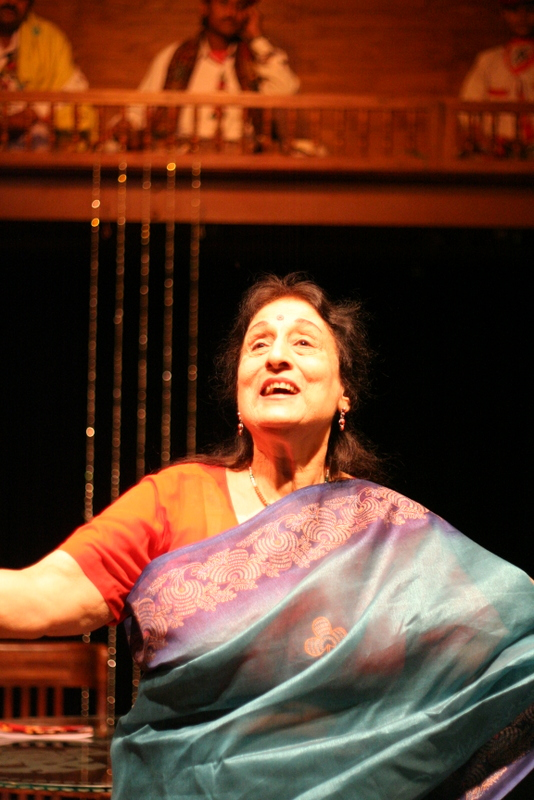
Jalabala Vaidya performing in Akshara theatre

== The Akshara Theatre, New Delhi ==
Jalabala and her husband, Gopal Sharman, are co-founders of the Akshara National Classical Theatre in New Delhi, India. The Akshara is a non-profit society, an arts complex designed and built by Sharman, where she has played the lead role in more than 20 plays. Registered as a society in 1980 under the name The Akshara National Classical Theatre of India, the theatre’s endeavour is to present theatre, music and dance in its various spaces on a nightly basis for a ticket paying audience in an effort to create a sustainable artistic model. The Akshara works towards fostering interaction between the diverse cultures of India and the world through the performing arts.

In addition to performances the Akshara runs the Diksha Programme of Training in Indian classicism, with year-long classes and workshops in the Indian performing arts for children and adults, as well as the popular, annual 5-week Diksha Summer Festival for children.

== Accolades ==
The Akshara's founders, Gopal Sharman and Jalabala Vaidya, have been recipients of various awards and honours such as the Sangeet natak Akademi's Tagore Award, the Homi Bhabha Fellowship Award, the Delhi Natya Sangh Award, Andhra Pradesh Natya Akademi Honour, and the Bharatiya Vidya Bhavan Honour. They were also made Honorary Citizens of the City of Baltimore, in the United States, when they played there. Jalabala also received the Alumni Honors Award from Miranda House in 2006.

Jalabala enjoyed her time painting, writing poetry and scripts, spending time with her family- most of whom work at the Akshara-while acting and teaching highly specialized acting classes at the Akshara and is the author of three books: Be, a collection of short stories, and two collections of poetry, This Is Full and That Is Full.

== Sources ==
- Vaidya, Anasuya (2014), Jalabala Vaidya Actress, Writer, Director, New Delhi: Akshara, p. 2, archived from the original on 30 January 2014
- Singh, Skendha (2014), Actor, Poet, Playwright: An Interview With Jalabala Vaidya, New Delhi: www.womenswed.in, p. 3
- F. Shepard, Richard (1975), About New York, India's Gift to Broadway, New York, USA: The New York Times Company
- Winn, Steven (1984), India Epic Makes for Uncommon Theatre, San Francisco, Northern California, USA: The San Francisco Chronicle
- "An Interview With Jalabala Vaidya: Actor, Poet, Playwright". Womensweb.in. 24 March 2014.
- Shailaja Tripathi (27 August 2010). "The classic act". Thehindu.com.
- Kale, Arun (18 July 2010). "Helter Skelter | Backstage with Jalabala Vaidya". Helterskelter.in.
- "Profile". Mirandahouse.ac.in.
