= Beatris de Menezes Bragança =

Indian research scientist (1916–1983)

- Born: Maria Luiza Beatris de Menezes Bragança; 6 November 1916; Cuelim, Portuguese Goa
- Died: 24 May 1983 (aged 66); Bombay, Maharashtra, India
- Occupations: Biochemist, research scientist
- Known for: First Dean of Tata Memorial Hospital
- Political party: Goan People's Party
- Movement: Goan independence movement
- Father: Luís de Menezes Bragança
- Relatives: Berta de Menezes Bragança (sister); T. B. Cunha (uncle)

Maria Luiza Beatris de Menezes Bragança (Note: alternatively spelled as Beatris de Menezes Braganza and Beatriz Menezes Braganza) (6 November 1916 – 24 May 1983) was an Indian independence activist and research scientist who was the first Dean of Tata Memorial Hospital. She is known for her research in cancer and in identifying a cure for cobra venom.

== Early life ==
Beatriz Braganza and Bertha Braganza, nieces of T. B. Cunha along with him

Maria Luiza Beatris de Menezes Bragança was born on 6 November 1916 in Cuelim village in Mormugao taluka. She and her sister Berta were daughters of Luís de Menezes Bragança and Ana, the sister of T. B. Cunha. She completed her MA and PhD in Biochemistry. She and her sister, Berta, wore khadi saris.

== Goan independence movement ==
Menezes Bragança was an active member of the anti-Portuguese protests and meetings in Bombay, British India. In 1945, she became one of the founders of the Goan Youth League, led by her uncle, T.B. Cunha. In 1946, she was one of the youth leaders who marched to the Portuguese Consulate in Bombay, protesting against Cunha's arrest. Also in 1946, she accompanied Joachim Dias to speak to then Prime Minister of India Jawaharlal Nehru about Goa's freedom; Nehru later issued a statement regarding the same. She was also associated with the National Congress (Goa) in Bombay.

Menezes Bragança then moved to Canada on a scholarship. Upon her return to Bombay, she continued her previous work, now joining the Goan People's Party (GPP).

She often visited other countries to attend scientific conferences, but used the opportunity to spread awareness of and request support for the Goan independence movement. At the Goan Political Convention, held on 5 October 1959, she was chosen as a member of the Goan Council. She was the Honorary Treasurer of the T. B. Cunha Memorial Committee.

== Research ==
In 1959 and 1960, she received the Lady Tata Memorial Trust scholarship to continue her research. She thus made important contributions in the research of cancer. She is known for her work in identifying a cure for cobra venom, getting interested in the topic by the high number of incidents of snake bites in Goa.

Menezes Bragança worked as a scientist at Haffkine Institute, Bombay, and was known internationally for her work. She later joined as a Research Scientist at the Tata Memorial Hospital. She later became its first Dean in 1974.

== Death ==
Menezes Bragança died in Bombay on 24 May 1983 of heart failure.
