= Frente Popular (Goa) =

Former political party of Goa, India

The Frente Popular Party (also named Janta Agadhi) is a former political party of Goa, India. It participated in the 1963 Goa, Daman and Diu Legislative Assembly election without any success.

== Background ==
Frente Popular was founded by Communists. Soon after the Liberation of Goa, they had formed the Shetkari Paksh (Farmers' Party) after working with the Goan farmers. They had also been actively organising people into unions in the mining belt of Goa and in the port town of Vasco da Gama. However, they did not want to contest with their Communist symbols to not attract the attention of the Goan Catholic Church, who considered the Communists as a threat.

Its stated ideals were secularism, democracy and socialism. It attacked the prohibition policy promoted by the Congress and criticized the administration of Goa for nepotism and corruption. They also highlighted issues that affected the Goan working class, along with a clear agenda of "Land to the Tiller".

Frente Popular was responsible for organizing mass rallies which were addressed by prominent national communist leaders such as S. A. Dange. It was headed by Bertha Menezes Braganza, a journalist from Bombay.

=== Views on Goa's statehood ===
There were persistent demands to merge the Union Territory of Goa into the newly created linguistic state of Maharashtra. The communists in India were staunch supporters of the Samyukta Maharashtra movement, which demanded an enlarged linguistic state of Maharashtra, which included Goa. However, the Frente Popular campaigned against a merger and supported full statehood for Goa.

== Political performance ==
Parties contesting in the 1963 Assembly Elections in Goa

In the 1963 Goa, Daman and Diu Legislative Assembly election, there were eight political parties; however, only four got recognition from the Election Commission of India, including the Frente Popular. The symbol allocated to the Frente Popular was the elephant.

Frente Popular fielded only eight candidates from the 30 available constituencies. It contested mainly in areas with high concentrations of labourers, fielding candidates from the trade unions. These eight candidates were:

- Berta de Menezes Bragança (Cortalim Assembly constituency)
- Gerald Pereira (Mormugao Assembly constituency)
- George Vaz (Tivim Assembly constituency)
- Divakar Kakodkar (Curchorem Assembly constituency)
- Vithal Parab (Mandrem Assembly constituency)
- Narayan Desai (Pernem Assembly constituency)
- J. P. Braganza (St. Cruz Assembly constituency)
- Chandrakant Kakodkar (Sanguem Assembly constituency)

The party did not win any seats, polling just 4,548 votes (1.82% of polled votes). The only two candidates who won a decent vote share were Pereira in Mormugao (19%) and Desai in Pernem (21%). The Roman Catholic Church's campaign for the United Goans Party has been cited as a major factor contributing to the party's poor showing. The day of polling was 9 December 1963, a Monday, and the Sunday Mass on the previous day influenced the voters.
