= Edatata Narayanan =

Edatata Narayanan (1907–1978) was a journalist and a freedom fighter from India. He took part in the freedom struggle through the Congress Socialist Party, a caucus within the Congress Party for activists with socialist leanings. He was among those who were disillusioned with the progress of Congress party on socialism and formed a new party, Socialist Party in 1948. He however left that party along with Aruna Asaf Ali and they visited Moscow along with Rajani Palme Dutt. Both of them joined the Communist Party of India (CPI) before Joseph Stalin's death but left the party in 1956 following Nikita Khrushchev's disowning of Stalin. Edatata Narayanan started a daily newspaper, Patriot (1963)° as the Chief Editor and was also associated with a weekly, Link in 1958 along with Aruna Asaf Ali. The publications became prestigious due to patronage of leaders such as Jawaharlal Nehru, Krishna Menon and Biju Patnaik. When Edatata Narayanan wanted to make some editorial changes amidst reported opposition from the editorial staff, he told them in no uncertain terms that he belonged to the school of journalism where the editor's view is final. He brought Patriot into the spotlight by publishing the income tax returns of top industrialists in it and thus, bringing the information into public domain. He pursued a pro-CPI and pro-Left editorial policy – Indira Gandhi, a good friend and later the Prime Minister of India herself was pro-left. The publications and the associated publishing house were successful. The relationship between him and Aruna Asaf Ali was controversial as they were believed to be living together, despite no formal marriage. He wrote a book titled Praja Socialism: Monopoly's Pawn on the merger of the Socialist Party with the Kisan Mazdoor Praja Party (founded by Acharya Kripalani).
