= Institute Menezes Braganza =

Cultural institute in Panjim, Goa, India

- Instituto Menezes Bragança
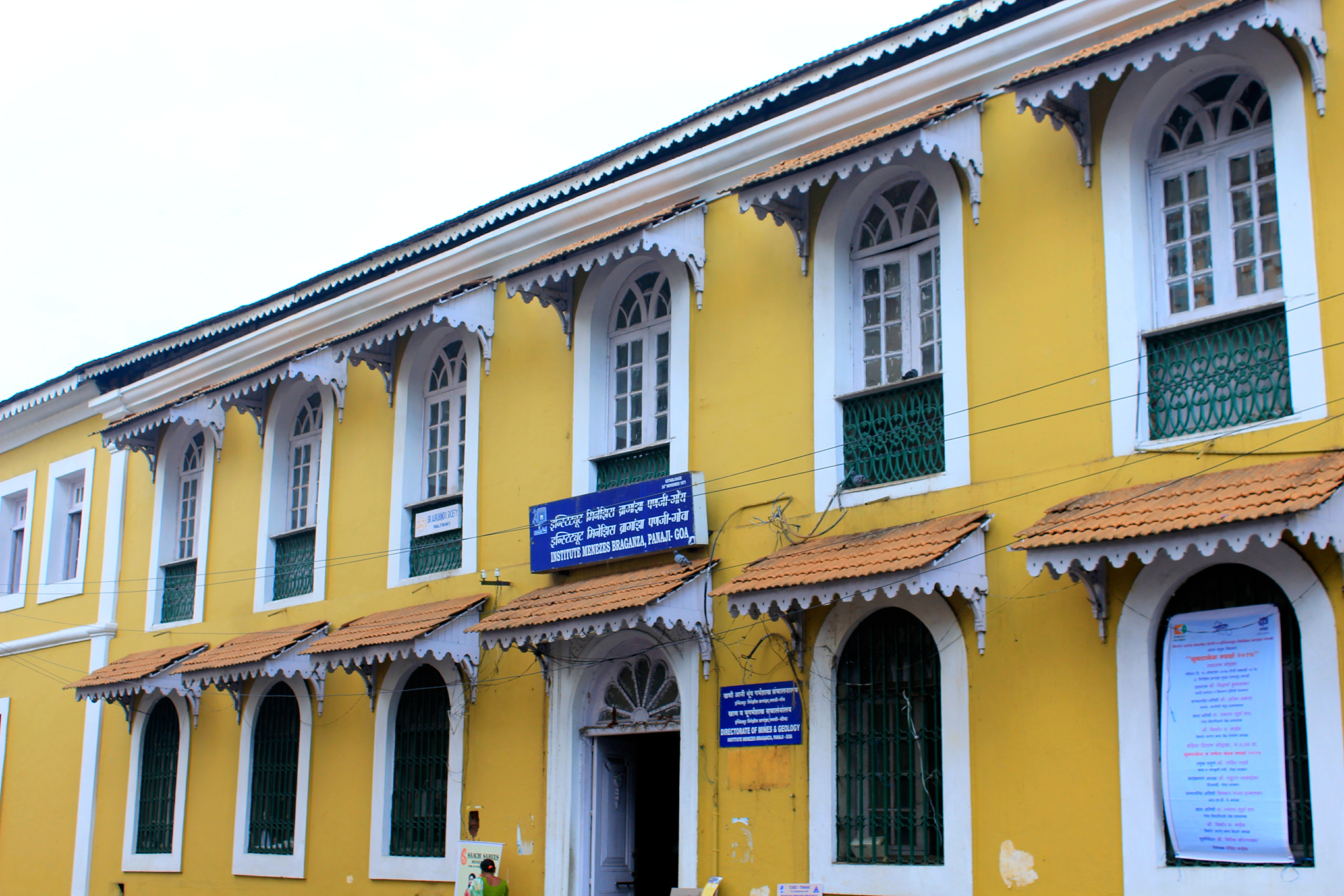
- Formation: 24 November 1871; 154 years ago
- Type: GO
- Chairman: Sanjay Harmalkar
- Vice-Chairman
- Main organ: Board
- Formerly called: Instituto Vasco da Gama

Institute Menezes Braganza is a cultural institute in the centre of Panjim, Goa, India. It was set up by Portuguese colonial authorities in the late 19th century, but was taken over by the Government of Goa and continues to play a role in the state's cultural activities. In 2002, its takeover by the government was the subject of litigation in the Bombay High Court.

== History ==
The Instituto Vasco da Gama was established on 24 November 1871 by Tomás Ribeiro under Portuguese colonial patronage to promote science and Lusophone literature in Goa. After publishing its monthly Boletim do Instituto Vasco da Gama and fostering the Indo‑Portuguese literary renaissance in Goa, the institute lapsed into inactivity by 1875 and was reconstituted by legislative decree in March 1925. Around that time, there was a need for an institute focusing on literary, scientific, and cultural themes, and a new Portaria (provincial order 105 dated 10 February 1925 and Legislative Diploma or enactment No.144 of 26 March 1925) was passed, with an annual grant of Rs.10,000.

In 1963, after the integration of Goa into the Indian Republic, it has changed its name to Institute Menezes Braganza, named after Luís de Menezes Braganza, journalist and one of the Goan pioneers of anti-colonialism. Later, in March 1925 it was attached to the Biblioteca Pública de Goa (public library of Goa). In 1952 it was honoured as a Commander of the Order of Saint James of the Sword (Comendador da Ordem Militar de Sant'Iago da Espada) for its scientific and cultural contributions.

In 1997, in a step which was questioned by some, the Government of Goa took over the institution, and re-established it as a society. The Bombay High Court dismissed the petition against the takeover of the institute, but expressed "a hope that the respondent- State [Government of Goa] shall maintain artifacts and/or paintings and/or coins and/or other valuable articles and shall make all attempts to preserve Portuguese culture for future generations."

== Architecture ==
The Instituto Vasco da Gama was a mid‑19th‑century Portuguese colonial building in Panjim’s historic quarter, the institute combines neoclassical façades with a central portico and flanking arcades. The entrance foyer is famed for its five monumental azulejo panels, that are painted by Jorge Colaço in Lisbon (1935–36) and shipped to Goa. They depicted the scenes from Os Lusíadas in blue‑and‑white tin‑glazed ceramic, the only work of Colaço installed in India. The main hall features high coffered ceilings and tall shuttered windows designed for tropical ventilation, framing a central marble bust of Luís de Menezes Bragança on an Italian granite plinth.

== Activities ==
The institute's stated aims are to "focus mainly on the promotion of activities in the fields of Language, Literature, Art & Culture in Goa". It organises literary and cultural activities, and also publishes the Bulletin of the Institute Menezes Braganza, historically published by Tipografia Rangel (Rangel Printing Press).
