= Mannur =

- Village
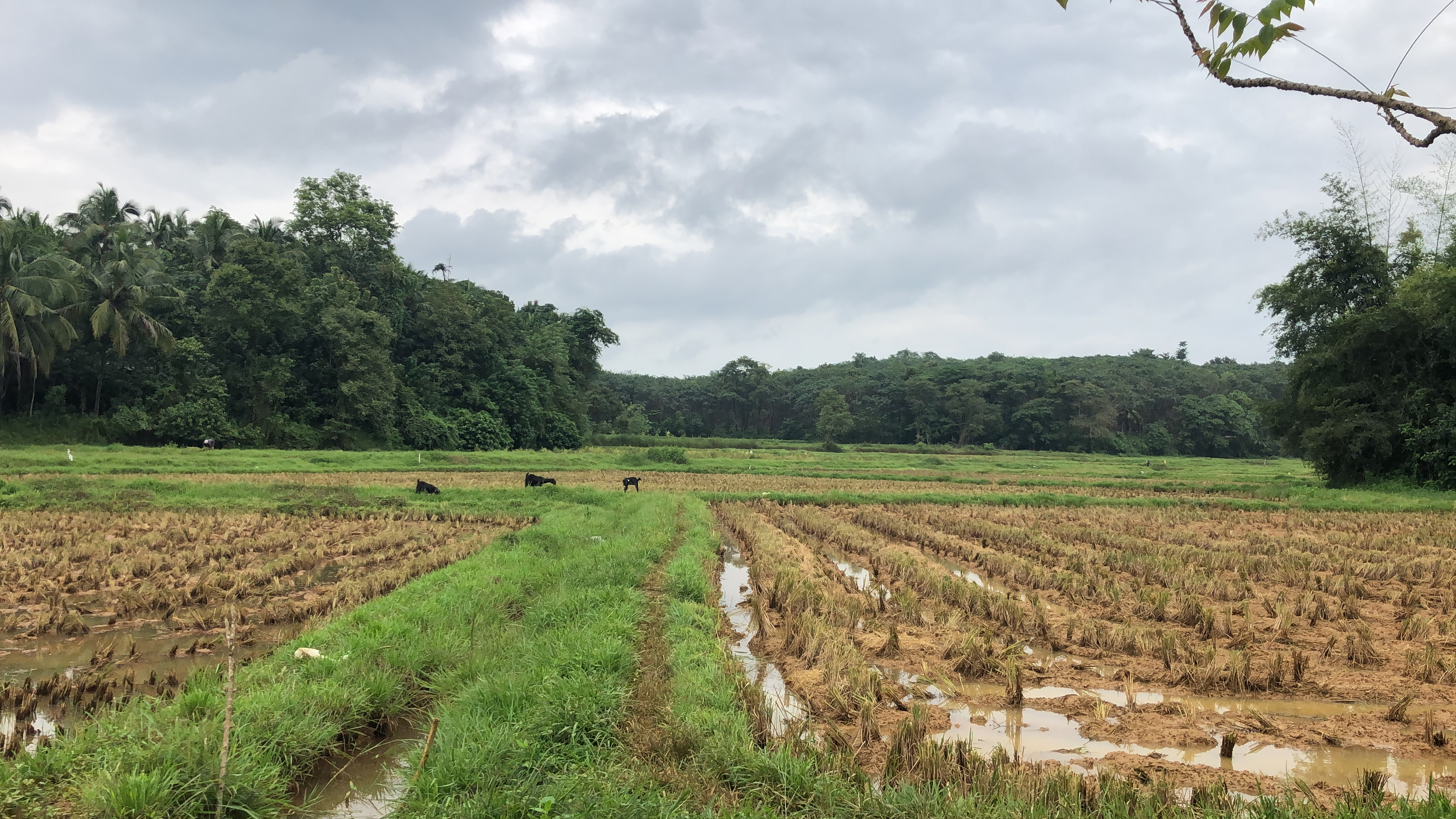

- Location in Kerala, India Mannur (India)
- Coordinates: 10.8027°N 76.4698°E
- Country: India
- State: Kerala
- District: Palakkad

Government
  - Type: Panchayati raj (India)
  - Body: Gram panchayat

Area
  - Total: 19.25 km^{2} (7.43 sq mi)
- Elevation: 37 m (121 ft)

Population (2011)
  - Total: 19,805
  - Density: 1,029/km^{2} (2,665/sq mi)

Languages
  - Official: Malayalam, English
- Time zone: UTC+5:30 (IST)
- PIN: 678642
- Vehicle registration: KL-09

Mannur is a village and gram panchayat in the Palakkad district, state of Kerala, India.

== Demographics ==
As of 2011 India census, Mannur had a population of 19,805 with 9,410 males and 10,395 females. Literacy rate of 15,878 with 8,023 females and 7,855 males.

Mannur is located 22.3 kilometres (13.9 mi) from Palakkad, the administrative headquarters of the district. Mannur is 262 kilometres (163 mi) from the state capital Thiruvananthapuram.

Mannur's Pin Code is 678642.
