= Goan People's Party =

Political group for Goa liberation

The Goan People's Party (GPP) is the name given to a historical Communist political grouping that struggled for the liberation of Portuguese India.

== Formation ==
The Indian National Congress (INC) had organised a meeting on 14 August 1948 in Bombay to celebrate one year of the Independence of India. Vaz and others protested at this meeting, stating that many of their allies were still imprisoned in both Goa and Portugal. The INC ignored them, leading Vaz to break away along with 20 others.

The Goan Peoples Party was then formed by George Vaz, Berta de Menezes Bragança and Divakar Kakodkar in 1949, after a split in the National Congress (Goa) over ideologies. It began as the socialist Goa Congress, later known as the Goan People's Party.

== Ideology ==
The party was Communist and its members worked closely with other Indian Communists.

== Liberation of Dadra and Nagar Haveli ==
In 1954, Narayan Palekar, Mario Rodrigues and George Vaz led volunteers of the GPP to capture more than 60 villages in Nagar Haveli. This was before its complete Liberation by the volunteers and commandos of the Azad Gomantak Dal.

== Publications ==
Gerald Pereira, who was a member of the GPP's central committee, became the editor of its publication, Goan Age. In its inaugural edition, published on 26 January 1954, Pereira wrote an article, Goa: Another Korea, which analyzed how Americans had strengthened their military presence near Goa. Palekar published the Goan Age for eight years. He worked to shift the GPP's headquarters to Belgaum some time in 1954, and then became its General Secretary.

== Leadership ==
It had George Vaz and Narayan Palekar as its General Secretary. Between 1961 and 1962 its representative in the CONCP was Aquino de Bragança.

== Notable members ==
- George Vaz
- Narayan Palekar
- Gerald Pereira
- Berta de Menezes Bragança
- Aquino de Bragança
