= T. B. Cunha =

Goan nationalist and activist (1891–1958)

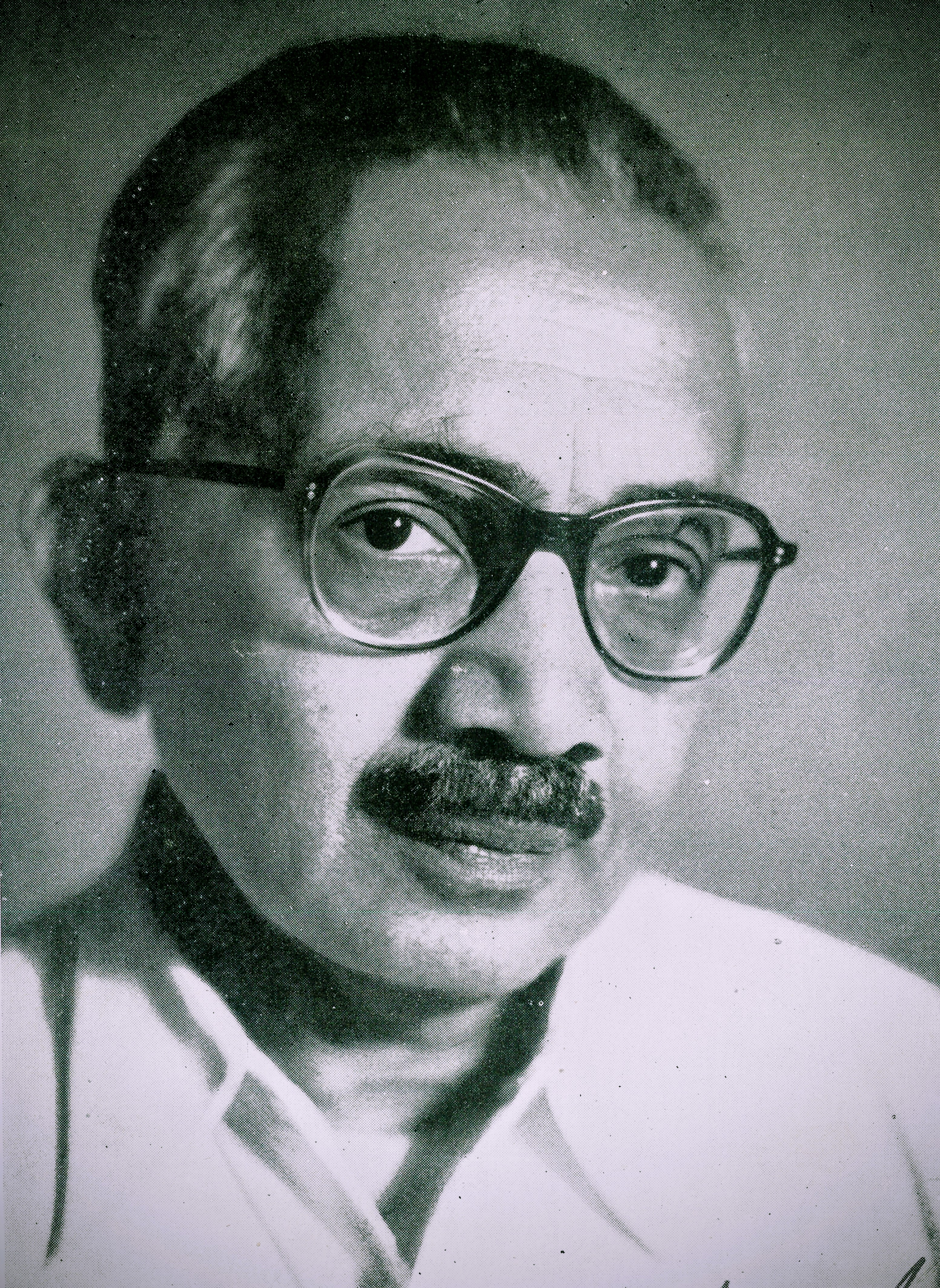
- Cunha in his 40s
- Born: Tristão de Bragança Cunha; 2 April 1891; Chandor, Goa, Portuguese India
- Died: 26 September 1958 (aged 67); Bombay, Bombay State, India
- Resting place: Azad Maidan, Panaji, India
- Education: Sorbonne University
- Known for: Organising the first movement to end Portuguese rule in Goa
- Movement: Goan independence movement
- Relatives: Luís de Menezes Bragança (brother-in-law); Berta de Menezes Bragança (niece); Beatris de Menezes Bragança (niece)

Tristão de Bragança Cunha (Note: alternatively spelled as Tristao de Braganza Cunha) (2 April 1891 – 26 September 1958), better known as T. B. Cunha, was a Goan nationalist and anti-colonial activist. Referred to as the "Father of Goan nationalism", he was the organiser of the first movement to end Portuguese rule in Goa.

== Early and personal life ==
T. B. Cunha (right) with his nieces Beatriz (left) and Berta (center)

Tristão de Bragança Cunha was born on 2 April 1891 in the village Chandor in Portuguese Goa. His parents were Ligório de Cunha, a medical practitioner, and Filomena Bragança. While his mother was from Chandor, his father was from Cuelim, Cansaulim. He completed his school education in Nova Goa and then went to Pondicherry to French College for his baccalauréat and then to Paris. There he studied at the Sorbonne University and obtained a degree in electrical engineering. In Paris, Cunha shared a residence with the Vietnamese revolutionary, Ho Chi Minh.

Cunha had two older brothers. The eldest brother, Vincent, was also an active nationalist. The other, Francisco, studied in London and later at the Sorbonne University in Paris. He translated the nationalistic views of Rabindranath Tagore into French and was later invited to teach at Shantiniketan. He also lived in Russia for many years, working with Russian revolutionary Vladimir Lenin.

Cunha was described as being "suited and booted, would not have food without cutlery even in public places and knew less of Konkani."

== Nationalist movement ==
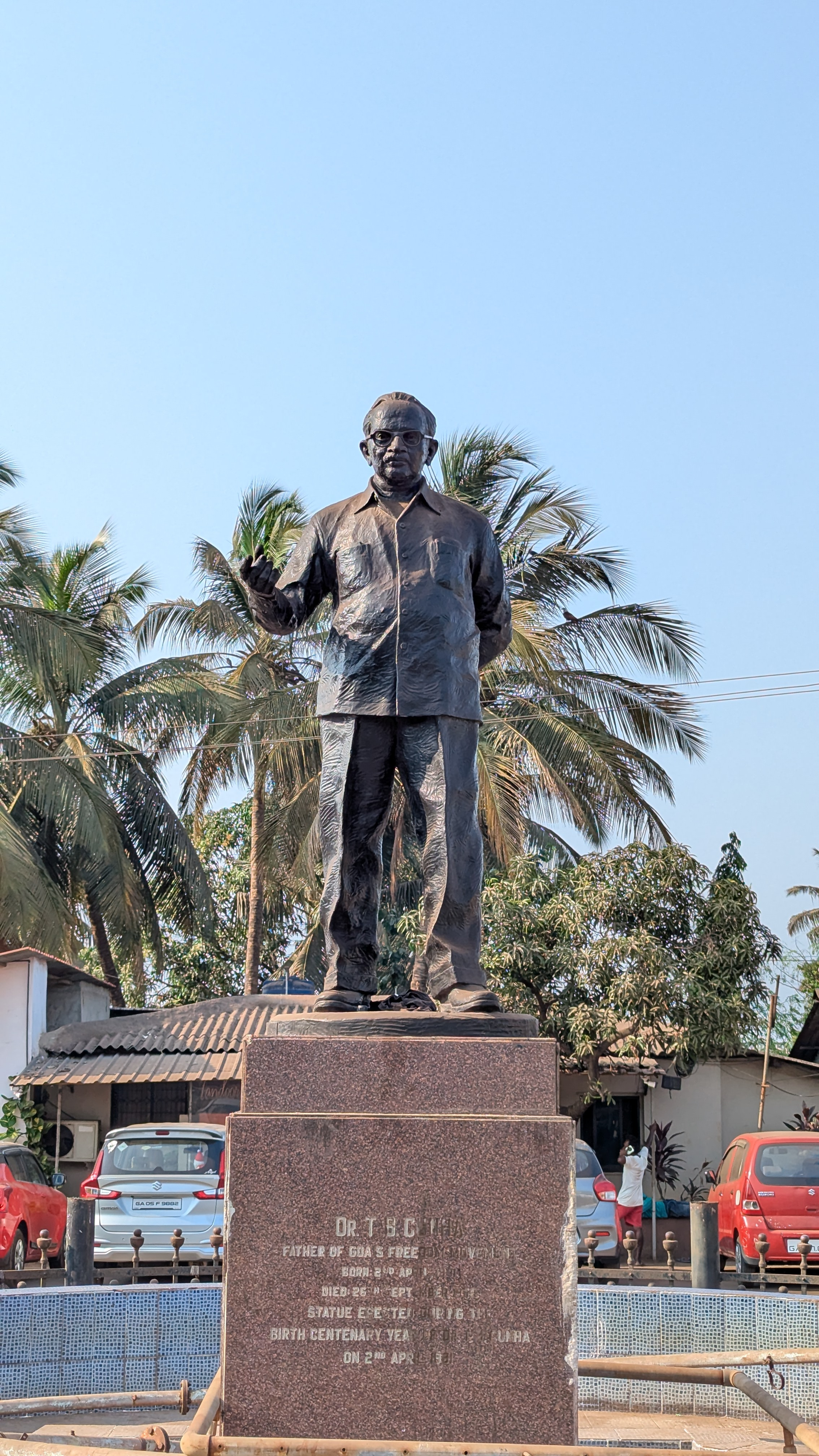
Statue of T. B. Cunha at T. B. Cunha Chowk, Vasco, Goa

In Paris, Cunha was associated with the Anti-Imperialist League and with French dramatist Romain Rolland and his Information Bureau as part of its Pro-Indian Committee. He published a biography of Mahatma Gandhi in French, before Rolland. He also worked together with French novelist Henri Barbusse. Cunha helped publicize the Indian independence movement generally, and the case of Portuguese India in particular, in the French language newspapers, such as the L'Europe Nouvelle and Clarté.

After returning to Goa in 1926, Cunha established the Goa National Congress (GNC) in Margão in 1928, after meeting with Subhash Chandra Bose, to mobilize Goans against Portuguese colonial rule. The Indian National Congress (INC) invited the GNC to its Calcutta session, offering it affiliation. However, in 1934, the INC decided to derecognize the GNC, stating that it was operating in a territory that was under alien rule. Cunha, now calling it the Comissão do Congresso de Goa (Goa Congress Committee), moved its operations to 21 Dalal Street in Bombay in 1936. However, the INC did not support Cunha's initiatives.

Cunha continued to publicize the Goan cause through several articles and books, denouncing Portuguese rule. Among his published works were the booklets Four Hundred Years of Foreign Rule and The Denationalisation of Goans (1944). He advocated for Goan identification, both politically and culturally, with greater India. A court then prosecuted him for his writings.

In 1929, Cunha launched a protest against agents of British tea planters against their forced indentation of Goan kunbis as labourers in Assam. He then took help from the INC and successfully got the Goans repatriated by 1940.

In 1941, Cunha raised funds for people who were affected by the monsoons in Mormugao and Salcete.

On 18 June 1946, Goa Revolution Day, Ram Manohar Lohia had addressed what was arguably the first and largest mass gathering yet, setting in motion the Goan independence movement. Cunha and his niece Berta de Menezes Bragança first held a meeting at the Margao bus stand on 20 June and then another on 30 June, at the same maidan in Margao where Lohia had given his speech, since then named as Lohia Maidan. Cunha was beaten up badly by the police. Bakibab Borkar, who was present at this meeting, wrote the song "Dotor bos, uthun cholunk lag" (transl. doctor, sit down, arise and march). Cunha was then arrested by the Portuguese authorities on 17 July. He was kept in dark damp cell at Fort Aguada. He was the first civilian to be tried by a military tribunal. He was court martialled and sentenced to eight years imprisonment in the Peniche Fortress in Portugal. Conditions in the prison were poor.

While at Peniche jail, he and the other freedom fighters, Rama Hegde, Purushottam Kakodkar, José Inácio Candido de Loyola and Laxmikant Bhembre, hosted the newlywed Pundalik Gaitonde and Edila Gaitonde for their honeymoon. These prisoners organised a celebration in honour of Pundalik and Edila. They hosted a meal for the newly-weds.

A Free Goa in a Free India

— Slogan by T. B. Cunha

Due to be released from Portugal in 1954, Cunha was left two years early in 1952 under Amnesty, on account of the Holy Year, but was not allowed to return to Goa. He then obtained a tourist visa to France and from there escaped to Bombay in 1953. Cunha formed and headed the Goa Action Committee, to help co-ordinate the numerous Goan organisations that had emerged by this time. He published a newspaper called Free Goa, along with his niece Berta de Menezes Bragança.

== Philosophy ==
Cunha believed Portugal to be a "primitive" coloniser that exploited colonies without any significant investment. While Salazar claimed that Goa was a burden on the Portuguese treasury, Cunha argued that Portugal exploited the Customs and downgraded the Indian currency, which helped Portugal with its balance of payments. Cunha further analysed Goa's separation from India at a cultural level, concluding that Goans were blindly imitating Western culture. He further argued that Christianity was used as a weapon for domination by the Portuguese.

== Death ==
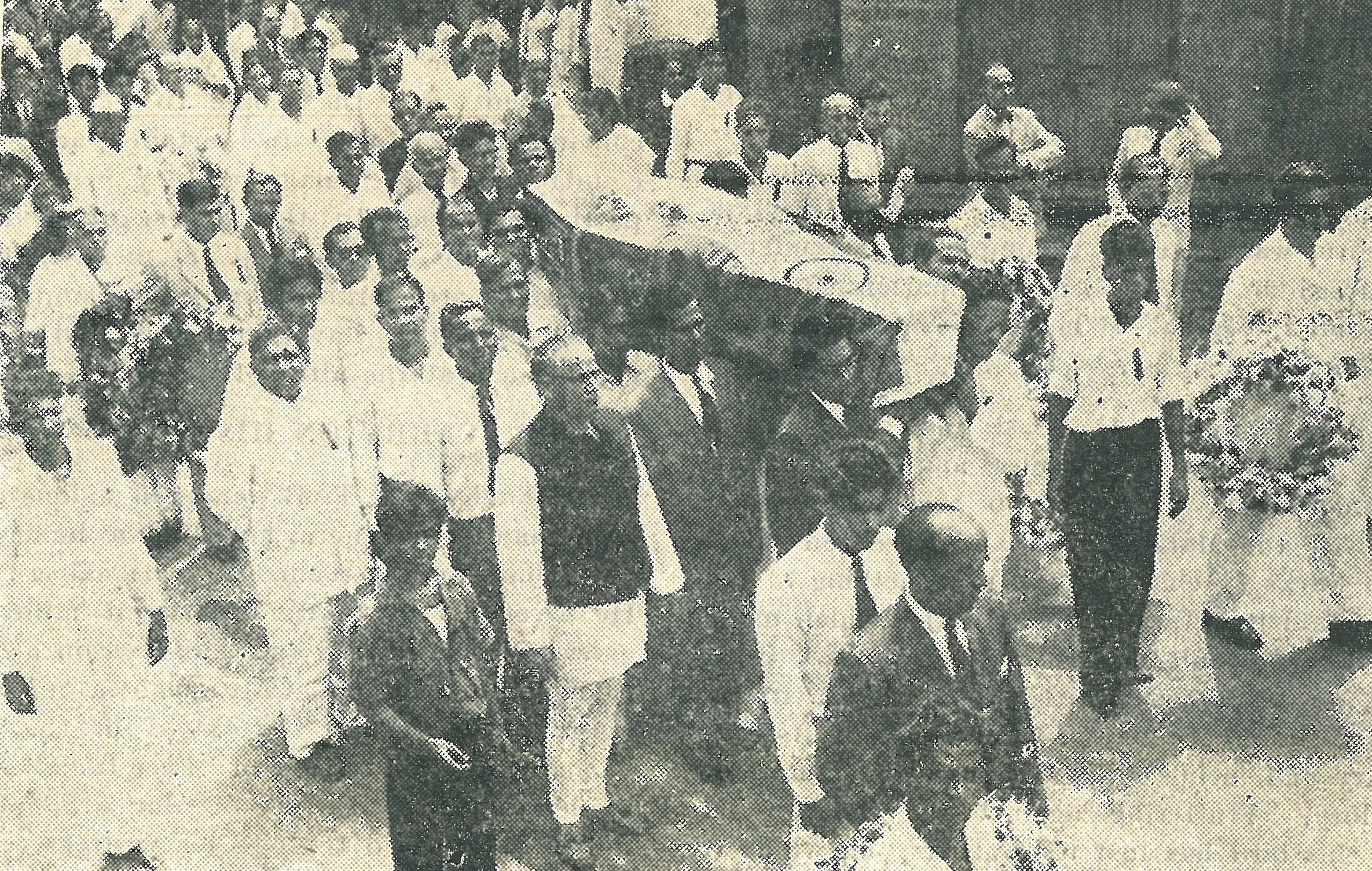
Funeral procession of T. B. Cunha. Gerald Pereira is seen as one of the pallbearers in the front left, with Jayaprakash Narayan seen in the centre left

Cunha died on 26 September 1958. The Catholic Church denied permission for his funeral and for his burial in the cemetery, because of his atheism. Politician and theorist Jayaprakash Narayan was one of the pallbearers at his cremation.

== Legacy ==
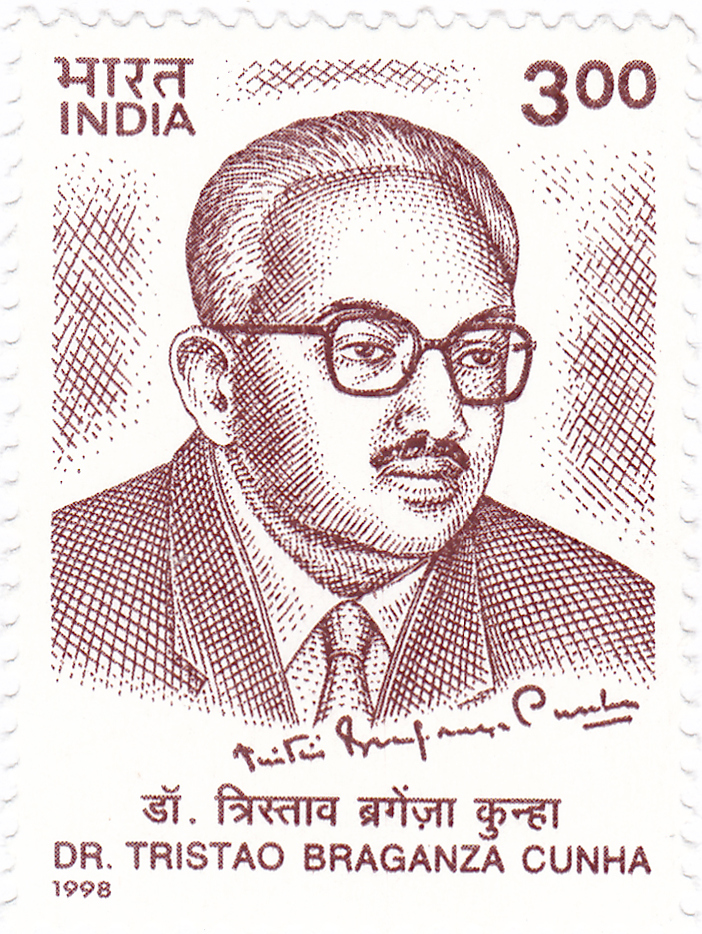
1998 stamp of India depicting T. B. Cunha

Cunha is referred to as the "Father of Goan nationalism", a term first used by K. M. Panikkar in his preface to a collection of Cunha's writings.

The World Peace Council at Stockholm, Sweden, in 1959 posthumously awarded Cunha a gold medal for his contribution to the cause of "Peace and Friendship among People." The Government of India issued a postage stamp in his honour.

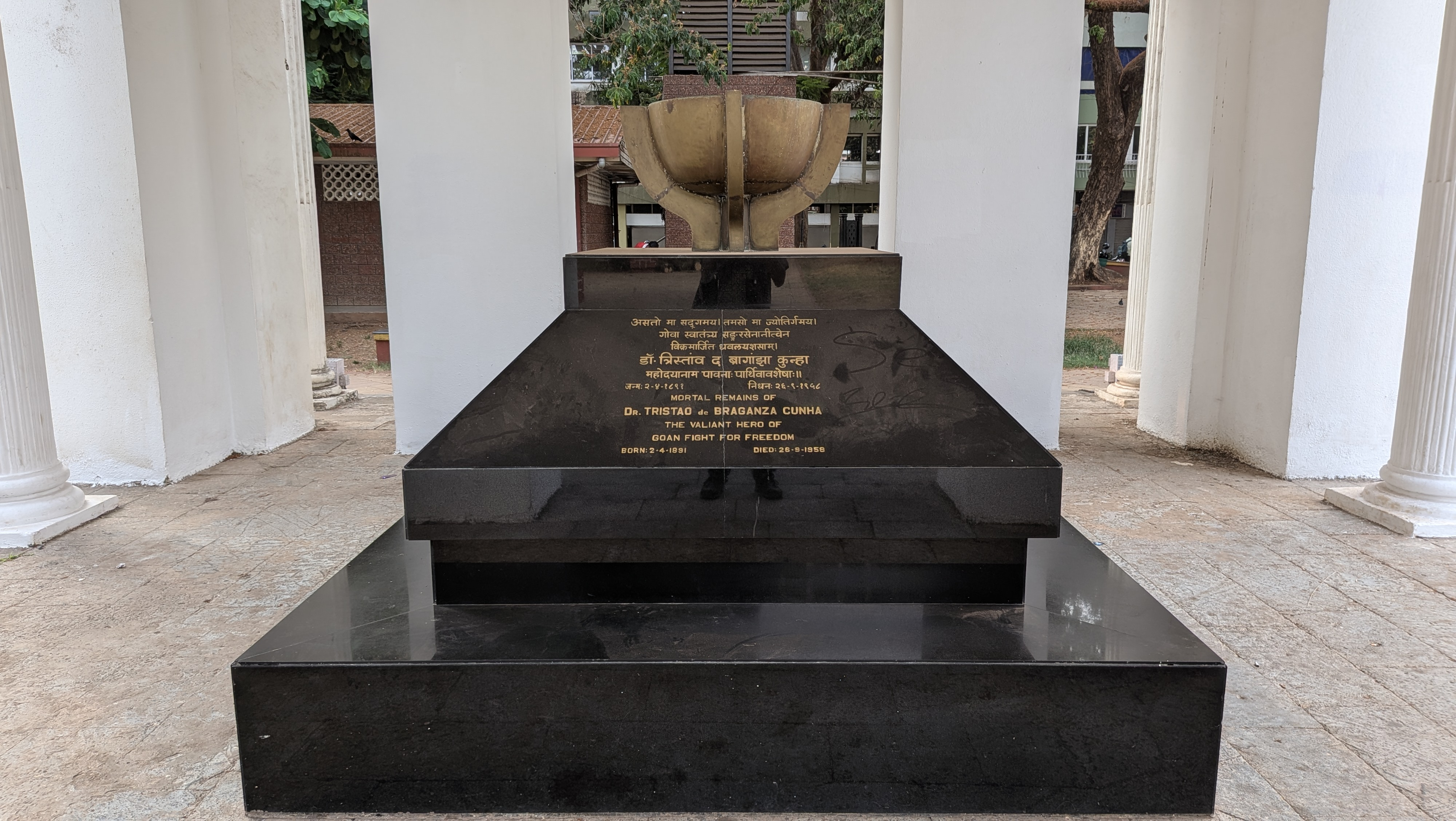
Mortal remains of T. B. Cunha at Azad Maidan

On 26 September 1986, Cunha's mortal remains were transferred from the Scotland cemetery at Sewri, Bombay, and are now housed in an urn at a memorial located in Panaji's Azad Maidan. A prominent road in the city of Panaji is named as T. B. Cunha Road. A statue of Cunha has been installed in his ancestral village of Cuelim, Cansaulim. A school in Margao and a government higher secondary school in Panaji are also named in Cunha's honour. The campus in Panaji's Altinho which houses the Goa College of Architecture and the Goa College of Music, is named as "Dr. T. B. Cunha Educational Complex".

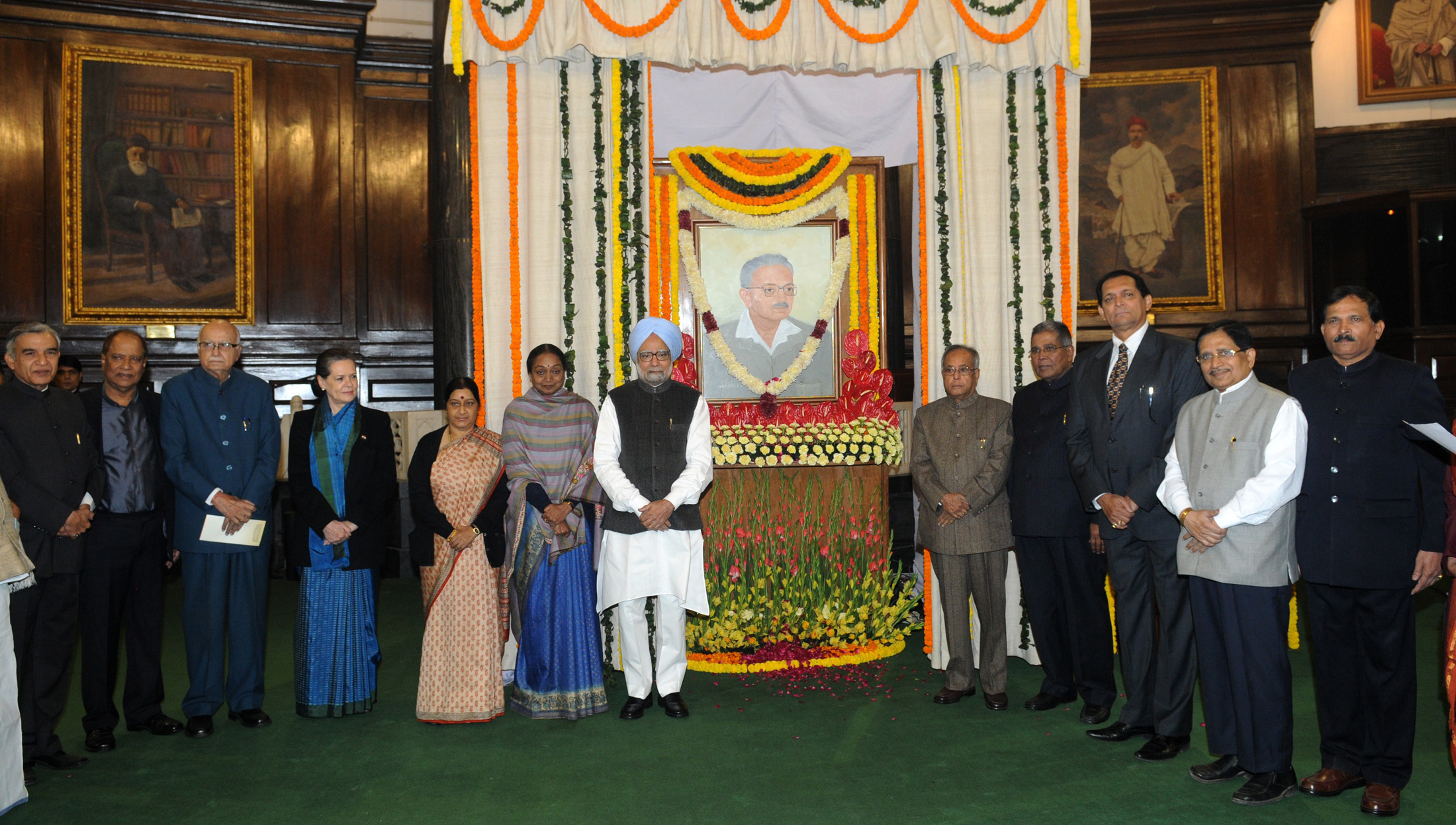
Unveiling ceremony of the portrait of Dr. Tristao De Braganca Cunha, at Parliament House, in New Delhi on 19 December 2011

A sports' complex in Cansaulim, Cuelim is named after him, and his portrait was unveiled in the Indian Parliament in 2011 to commemorate the golden jubilee of Goa's accession to India.

The comic book, The Life & Times of T. B. Cunha, by Nishtha Desai, was published in 2015. Illustrated by Ved Prabhudesai, Desai's comic book is based on her PhD research. Near its end, the comic book reveals that, shortly before he died, Cunha expressed "disappointment with the Indian government's actions" regarding Goa, seeing the nation's interests in the region as being an extension of colonialism; this was a departure from Cunha's lifelong belief in India being able to save a supposedly "denationalised" Goa. In his review of Desai's comic book about Cunha's life, Dale Luis Menezes classifies it as a hagiography, one that "is faithful to Cunha and his views on Goan history and, as such, reproduces many of his problematical nationalist stances ... One would have expected a lot more given that Cunha’s ideas and writings show a change over a period of time – especially since he was unhappy with the manner in which India was handling the question of Goan self-emancipation."
