= Luís de Menezes Bragança =

Goan journalist and activist (1878–1938)

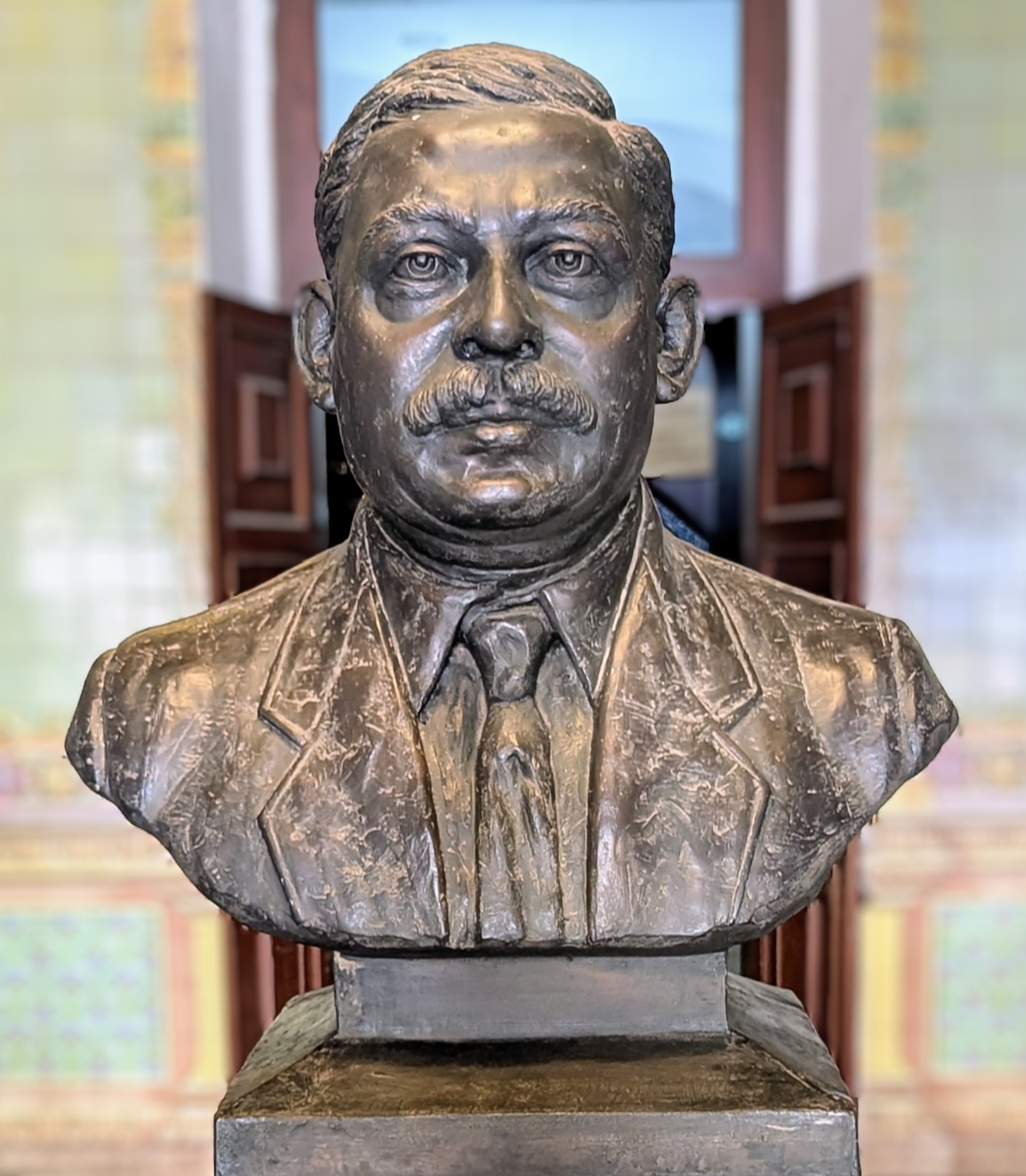
- Bust of Luís de Menezes Bragança at Institute Menezes Braganza
- Born: 15 January 1878; Chandor, Goa, Portuguese India
- Died: 10 July 1938 (aged 60); Chandor, Goa, Portuguese India
- Education: Rachol Seminary
- Occupations: Journalist; writer; politician; activist
- Years active: 1898–1938
- Children: Berta; Beatris
- Relatives: T. B. Cunha (brother-in-law)

Luís de Menezes Bragança (Note: alternatively spelled as Luís de Menezes Braganza) (15 January 1878 – 10 July 1938) was a Goan journalist, writer, politician and anti-colonial activist. He was one of the few Goan aristocrats who actively opposed the Portuguese colonisation of Goa. During his lifetime, Menezes Bragança was widely hailed around the Lusosphere (Portuguese speaking world) as "O Maior de todos" ("The Greatest of all Goans") and in the Indian mainland as "The Tilak of Goa".

== Early life ==
Luís de Menezes Bragança was born as Luís de Menezes on 15 January 1878 in Chandor, Salcette, to a Chardo family. His mother hailed from the illustrious Bragança clan of the same village. His father, Juveniano Menezes, was a lawyer. Since his father passed away during his childhood, his mother took responsibility for his upbringing and education.

He commenced his primary education in the Portuguese language in the town of Mapusa. He pursued his subsequent studies at the Rachol Seminary, where he studied philosophy and the tenets of the Catholic faith. After completing his higher secondary education at the Liceu de Goa with excellent grades, he joined the Escola Medico-Cirurgica de Goa. Although he initially found academic success there, poor health during his first year forced him to leave his medical studies unfinished. Following this, he dedicated himself to a deep study of economics, sociology, political philosophy, literature, and science, absorbing progressive ideas across these fields. Apart from his proficiency in Konkani and Portuguese, he possessed a strong command of English, French, and Marathi.

Later on in life, his maternal grandfather Francis Xavier Bragança who had no sons, nominated Luís, his eldest grandson as his heir. Luís then adopted his maternal surname as his own surname and subsequently became Luís de Menezes Bragança. This was contrary to Portuguese custom, whereby the maternal surname is typically followed by the paternal surname. Although raised a Roman Catholic, Menezes Bragança later became an agnostic.

== Journalistic career ==
By the age of twenty, Menezes Bragança had gained a reputation as a fine writer in the Portuguese language. At the age of 25, Menezes Bragança entered public life as a journalist. He began articulating his independent views through the periodical Parald in 1900, and subsequently through O Nacionalista. His central objective was to familiarize people with Goan culture (which he viewed as being rooted in Indian culture) and to use this cultural identity to cultivate ideas of Swaraj and independence in the minds of Goans. On 22 January 1900, together with another Goan writer Messias Gomes he co-founded O Heraldo (The Herald), which was the first Portuguese-language daily in Goa. His columns in the newspaper were typified by satirical wit, wherein he would attack the Portuguese government and reactionary thinking from Hindu and Catholic intellectuals. Menezes Bragança was a strong believer in secularism and propounded the ideals of a Secular republic in his columns, prior to the formation of the Portuguese First Republic on 5 October 1910.

In 1911, he founded O Debate (The Debate), of which he was the principal editor until 1921. During this period, he also strove to awaken the political consciousness and cultural identity of the Goan people. Menezes Bragança was a regular contributor to Pracasha (Light), a Konkani-language weekly wherein he wrote in great length on subjects such as freedom of thought, freedom of expression and freedom from oppression. His writings provided a great deal of information about the Indian independence movement to the Goan public, and as such, was avidly read by them for news about the Indian mainland. On 1 December 1919, Menezes Bragança founded another Portuguese-language daily Diário de Noite (The Evening News). Like O Debate, this daily also had a wide Goan readership and dealt with the events in the Indian mainland as well as Goan cultural issues.

From 1920 onwards, his articles, containing contemporary ideas, began appearing in the periodical O Pracasha. Through these publications, he championed human rights and emphasized that citizens must be free from social, political, and economic oppression to achieve comprehensive development.

His writings were characterized by intense idealism, secularism, progressivism, fearlessness, and realism, combining scholarship with imagination and sensitivity. He held the view that freedom of thought is not merely restricted to national independence but holds the essential seeds for the development of humanity. He believed that political freedom is the starting point for global coexistence rather than being confined to a single nation. He consistently opposed the discriminatory policies of the Portuguese administration towards Goans and also advocated for religious purification. The ideas expressed in his book, The Opinion of Injustice and Justice of Opinion, inspired progressive and freedom-loving individuals. Due to his work, his contemporaries and fellow Goans referred to him as "The Greatest of All" (O Maior de todos), while in other parts of India, he came to be known as "Goa's Tilak".

== Activism ==
It suffices for me that Konkani is our mother tongue and that no other will do for us as a mother tongue, however much we may learn them for culture's sake or for business' sake.

— Quote from his essay, Why Konkani? (1914)

Menezes Bragança was a staunch advocate for the cause of Konkani. In 1914, he began a campaign in defence of the language in O Heraldo, urging its development. In this, he received the wide support of the Goan intelligentsia. He advocated the impartation of primary school education in Konkani, and blamed the Portuguese authorities' preoccupation with denationalisation of the Goan people for its failure to encourage the language. Menezes Bragança championed the cause of the less privileged sections of Goan society. In 1933, with the coming to power of the Estado Novo regime headed by António de Oliveira Salazar in Portugal, he placed himself at the head of the anti-colonialist movement in Goa. After the promulgation of the racist Portuguese Colonial Act in 1930, he proposed a resolution at the Legislative council in Panjim on 3 July of the same year. The resolution upheld the right of self-determination for Goans from the Portuguese rule, and was duly adopted. Menezes Bragança was the first person to call for an independent Goa and as such, was generally hailed as the "father of Goan unrest". His brother-in-law, Tristão de Bragança Cunha, was also a prominent Indian nationalist.

== Political career ==
Between 1910 and 1913, Menezes Bragança served as the president of the Ilhas municipality. Following the establishment of a republican regime in Portugal, a liberal administrator, Dr. Conceicao de Cost, arrived in Goa as Governor and appointed Bragança as his administrative assistant. He was also an active member of the Provincial Congress Goa organization and served as the president of its fourth Congress in 1921. In 1924, he participated as the representative of Portuguese India at a colonial conference held in Lisbon. Later, in 1929, he attended the national session of the Hindustan Congress in the city of Lahore, where he held discussions with various Indian political leaders. He was also a member of an eminent elite cultural organisation, Instituto Vasco da Gama.

== Works ==
Menezes Bragança was a prolific author of books. Some of his most notable works are Life of St. Luís de Gonzaga, Model and Protector of Youth (1893), The Neuter School (1914), The Comunidades and the Cult (1914), The Castes (1915), An Open Letter to Dr. Afonso Costa (1916), A Rev. Master Flayed (1916), India and her Problems (1924), Tourism in Goa (1927), Letter to an innocent (1927), and About an Idea (1928).

== Death ==
Towards the final years of his life, Menezes Bragança was persecuted by the Estado Novo regime for his outspoken criticism of their government. His demand for the granting of autonomy to Goa was refused, and his newspapers were shut down by order of Antonio Salazar. He died on 10 July 1938 in his mansion in Chandor, Portuguese Goa, from a heart attack. Fearing an outbreak of nationalist protests in Goa, the Portuguese government stationed troops at his grave to prevent any homage from being paid to his memory.

== Legacy ==
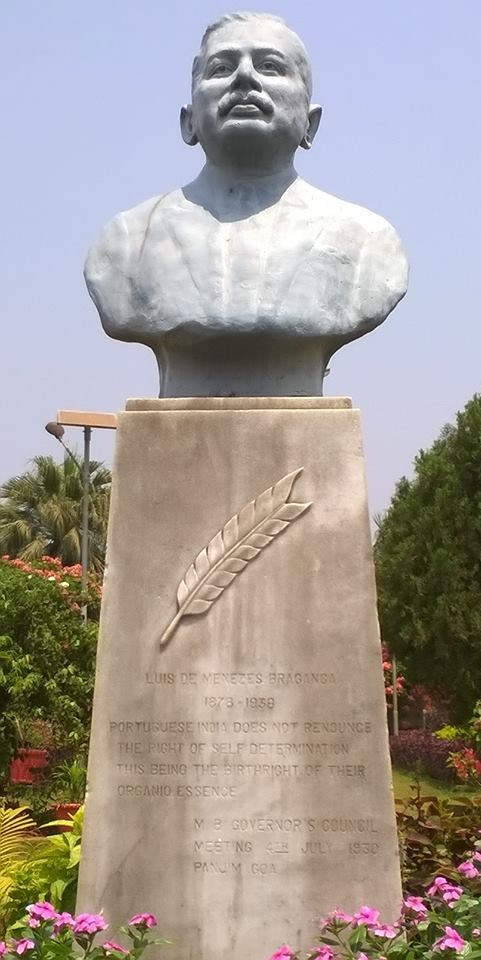
Bust of Luís de Menezes Bragança

On 9 July 1963, on the occasion of his 25th death anniversary, the Instituto Vasco da Gama was renamed by its management to Institute Menezes Braganza in his honour. A bust of Bragança exists in the Institute. Another bust of him is located in the Margao Municipal Garden. In 1965, the Bragança Memorial Committee published a volume of his selected writings under the title Prosas Dispersas.

Professor Dr. Sushila Sawant Mendes has published a book, Luis de Menezes Bragança: Nationalism, Secularism and free-thought in Portuguese Goa. This book is based on the doctoral thesis of Mendes, awarded to her by the Goa University in 2012.

Institute Menezes Braganza
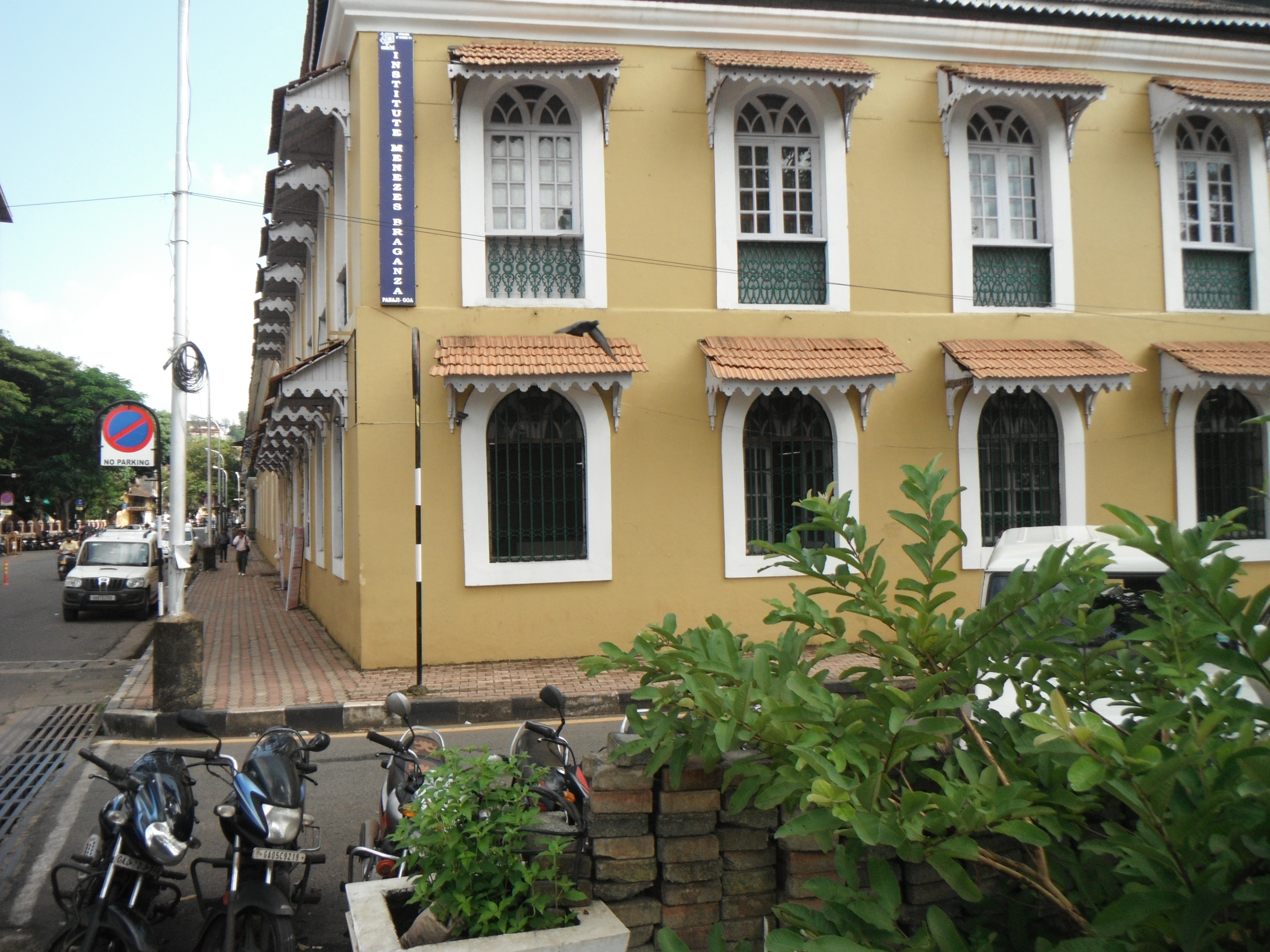
Institute Menezes Braganza at Panjim, an exterior view

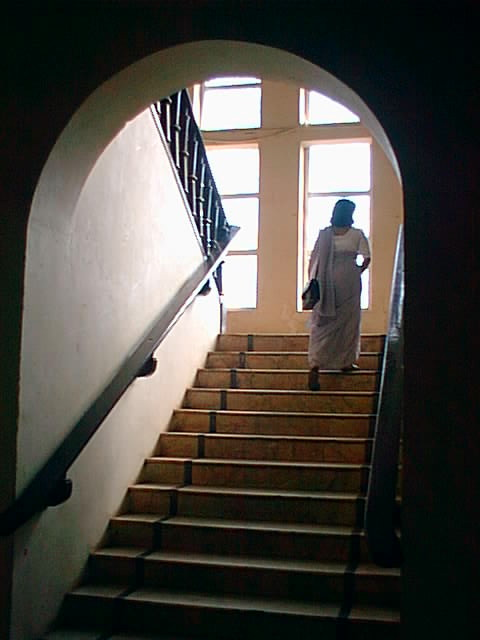
Institute Menezes Braganza, an interior view.
