= Chandor =

- Village
- Location of Chandor in Goa Chandor (India)
- Coordinates: 15°15′52″N 74°02′52″E
- Country: India
- State: Goa
- District: South Goa
- Sub-district: Salcete
- Time zone: UTC+5:30 (IST)
- Postcode: 403714
- Area code: 0832

Chandor is a village in Salcete sub-district of South Goa, in the Indian state of Goa. It lies on the southern bank of the Zuari River and western bank of the Kushavati River.

== History ==
The ancient city of Chandrapura, where Chandor now stands, served as a capital from the Bhoja period to that of the Kadambas. The name comes from Chandreshwar, meaning Lord of the Moon, after the Hindu god Shiva, who wears a crescent in his hair. Chandor has a fort and a temple within its citadel. Located 10 km (6.2 mi) from the inland of Margao, it has both ancient and modern aspects to its history.

Chandor also boasts ancient inscriptions of Bhoja kings, dating back to the 3rd or 4th Century CE. It is thought that by the 3rd century, the Bhojas had ruled over Goa, as well as Shashti, Antruz, Bardez, North Kanara district, part of Belgaum district, and some other areas around Goa with their main power base being Chandrapur (current Chandor). The earliest piece of evidence being the Siroda plate, found in Shiroda on the banks of a river. It also has a Shiva temple, with old remnants of the fortress walls and forms one of the oldest structural remains in Goa. Chandor’s origins are not exact, which has been justified by the fact that there has been found pottery of the Satyavahanas, which leads one to think that their dynasty was much older than the Bhoja kings, ruling far back as 200 BCE.

Chandor was also the capital of the Kadambas until 1054, when they moved the capital to Govepuri/Gopakapattan (Goa Velha). Govepuri was destroyed in 1312, prompting them to move the capital back to Chandor, until it too was sacked in 1327.

Father Heras on his discovery of Chandor in 1929 CE, found a very old and shattered image of Nandi, Shiva’s Bull, believed to be affected adversely by raids in the 13th century CE. This is part of a complex housing the relics of an ancient temple dedicated to Shiva, known alternatively as Isvorachem.

The first Jain sculpture belonging to the early southern Shilahara in Salcete, Chandor was discovered by Fr Henry Heras during one of his expeditions.

The citizens of Chandor have long harboured a fear of marrying women, due to a "Queen's curse" dating to the Kadamba dynasty. Many men thus prefer to leave the village before marrying a woman.

Chandor is home to many ruined forts.

== Geography ==
Chandor is located at 15°15′52″N 74°02′52″E. It has an average elevation of 2 m (6.6 ft).

== Transport ==
Chandor is connected by road from Margao. It has its own railway station.

== Notable places ==
- Braganza House
- St. James' Chapel (with historical palace step stone at the entrance)
- Nossa Senhora de Belem Church
- Monte Church
- Old Shiv Temple/ Nandi Bull from Bhoja period.
- Figuerado mansion

== Bragança house ==
The Bragança House was built in the 17th century. This huge house is situated on one side of the village square. It has now been divided into two separate houses, with a common entrance.

The east wing, occupied by the Pereira Bragança family, has a small chapel with a relic of St. Francis Xavier, which is a fingernail. The artefacts, collected by the family over a number of years, have added to the beauty of the house. There is a Great Salon, a large ballroom with the floor made of Italian marble, antique chandeliers from Europe adorning the ceiling, and heavily carved, ornate rosewood furniture. What stands out among the furniture is a pair of high-backed chairs, bearing the family crest, which was given to the Pereira Bragança family by King Dom Luís of Portugal. Most of the furniture dates back to the 18th century and is made from local seeso (martel wood), lacquered or inlaid with mother of pearl by craftsmen from Curtorim village. For antique aficionados, the house holds many delightful finds.

The west wing of the house belongs to the Menezes Bragança family. Apart from its exquisite furniture and Chinese porcelain from Macau, it also houses a collection of family portraits, dating back to the 17th and 18th centuries. The library is believed to be the first private library in Goa. It has almost 5,000 leather bound books in Portuguese, English and French collected by Luís de Menezes Bragança (1878–1938), a reputed journalist, renowned for the part he played in Goa’s independence movement.
