= Indian annexation of Dadra and Nagar Haveli =

Annexation by India

- Part of the decolonisation of Asia and the Cold War
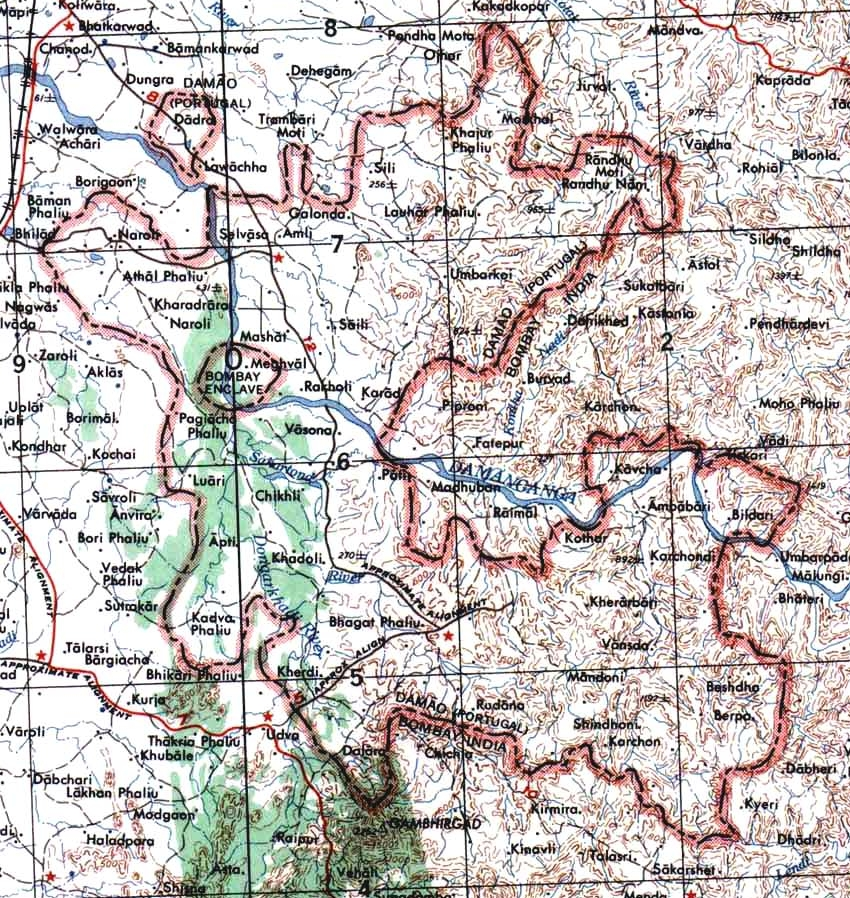
- Map of Dadra and Nagar Haveli in the 1950s
Date	22 July – 11 August 1954 (2 weeks and 6 days)
Location	Dadra and Nagar Haveli, Portuguese India
Result	Indian rebel victory
Territorial changes	Free Dadra and Nagar Haveli established

Belligerents
(India) Indian nationalists and communists: United Front of Goans; National Liberation Movement Organization; Goan People's Party; Communist Party of India; Azad Gomantak Dal; Supported by: India	Portugal: Portuguese India

Commanders and leaders
Francis Mascarenhas; Com. L.B. Dhangar; Prabhakar Sinari; Raja Wakankar; Nana Kajrekar	(Estado Novo (Portugal)) Captain Virgílio Fidalgo

Strength
Nearly 201,000 volunteer fighters: 200,000 Warli adivasis; CPI fighters; 50 UFG rebels; GPP rebels; AGD fighters; NLMO fighters	329 units in total: Portuguese India Police constables

Casualties and losses
Unknown	2 killed

The Indian annexation of Dadra and Nagar Haveli was the process in which the territories of Dadra and Nagar Haveli passed from Portuguese rule to independent rule, with Indian allegiance, in 1954.

Dadra and Nagar Haveli were small undefended Portuguese overseas territories, part of Portuguese India ever since they were handed over by the Maratha Empire after the Treaty of 1779. The territories were enclaves, without any access to the sea, administered by the Portuguese Governor of the district of Damão.

After India attained independence in 1947, some residents, with the help of volunteers from organizations such as the United Front of Goans (UFG), the National Movement Liberation Organization (NMLO), the Goan People's Party (affiliated to communist ideology), and the Communist Party of India, and also with the support of nationalist organizations such as the Azad Gomantak Dal (AGD), occupied Dadra and Nagar Haveli in 1954 and displaced Portuguese rule. The territories were subsequently merged into the Republic of India in 1961.

== Background ==
After Indian independence in 1947, pro-India activists in the Portuguese Indian provinces, as well as Indians from other regions, proposed removing Portuguese control of Goa, Daman, Diu, Dadra, and Nagar Haveli and integrating them with India. This was in line with the ideology of Mahatma Gandhi who affirmed that "Goa cannot be allowed to exist as a separate entity in opposition to the laws of the free State [of India]" prior to India's independence.

Appasaheb Karmalkar, a bank employee with the Goa government took the reins of the National Liberation Movement Organization (NLMO) for the control of Portuguese-ruled Indian territories. The Goa People's Party and the then- Communist Party of India had been arming and mobilizing Warli adivasis in the neighboring districts since the mid-40s. Comrade L.B. Dhangar, Roopji Kadu, and 'Godutai' Godavari Parulekar led the Warli communists during the Dadra and Nagar Haveli struggle against Portuguese colonialism, mobilizing around the slogan of 'Land to the tiller!'

Simultaneously, the Azad Gomantak Dal (AGD), led by Vishwanath Lawande, Dattatraya Deshpande, Prabhakar Sinari and Gole had been planning an armed assault on Dadra and Nagar Haveli. Wakankar and Kajrekar visited the area around Dadra, Nagar Haveli and Daman several times in 1953 to study topography and to get acquainted with workers and leaders who were agitating for the merger of the Portuguese territory with India.

The NLMO and AGD agreed to form a united front for the liberation of Dadra and Nagar Haveli, in April 1954.

In April 1954, the NLMO, AGD, and RSS planned an armed invasion of Dadra and Nagar Haveli at a meeting in Elphinstone Garden. Independently, the United Front of Goans (UFG) also pursued similar plans.

On 21 July 1954, the Communist Party of India forced the Portuguese to retreat from Dadra under the leadership of Francis Mascarenhas, Narayan Palekar, Parulekar, Vaz, Rodriguez and Tristão Cunha.

=== The Portuguese situation ===
The situation throughout Dadra and Nagar Haveli was controlled by the Special Reserve Police (SRP) of the Government of India. Deputy Inspector General of Police (DIG) J. D. Nagarwala was in overall control of the SRP with the purpose of preventing the infiltration of Portuguese military personnel and material from Goa to Nagar Aveli, via Damão and Dadra. Nagarwala was sympathetic towards the rebels, he had visited the area often and advised the rebels on the next moves. The SRP also controlled the entry of civilians to and from the Portuguese areas by issuing permits to stop the infiltration of undesirable persons, such as members of the Communist Party. The Portuguese Chief of Police at Silvassa, Senh. Falcão, had a total police force of 329 constables – out of which three were stationed at Dadra and nine at Naroly.

Dadra was surrounded from all sides by Indian territory and Naroly would be isolated by the Daman Ganga River during the monsoon, so the rebels decided to take over Dadra and Naroly during the monsoon in the July. The takeover of Silvassa would be worked out after occupying Dadra and Naroly.

=== Invasion of Dadra ===
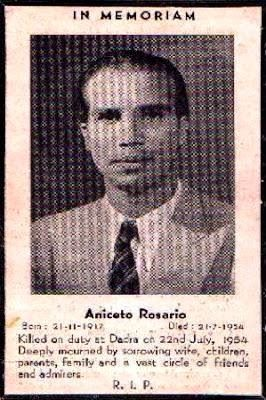
Obituary card for Aniceto Rosário, the first casualty of the war

Dadra had a total of three police officers to maintain law and security in the region. The UFG, led by Francis Mascarenhas, Viman Sardesai and others, attacked the police station of Dadra on the night of 22 July 1954, assassinating Aniceto Rosário, an inspector at Dadra Police Station. There were two other police officers in the police station, who were overpowered by the UFG forces. The next morning, an Indian flag was hoisted to declare Dadra a free territory. A gram panchayat for Dadra was formed under the administration of Jayanti Bhai Desai.

=== Invasion of Naroly ===
A total of six police officers were in charge of the security in the Naroly region, at that time. On 28 July, some 20 to 25 RSS activists led by Wakankar and 8 to 10 AGD volunteer fighters led by Sinari crossed the Darotha river and reached Naroly, storming the police station. The chief, his constable, and the other four Portuguese police officers were forced to surrender. Thus, on 28 July 1954, Naroly was liberated from Portuguese rule. On 29 July a gram panchayat for Naroly was established.

=== Invasion of Luhari ===
On 30 July, close to 200,000 Indian Adivasi Communist protestors rallied on the Indian side of the Dadra and Nagar Haveli borders. The small police force was unable to restrain them and a detachment charged into the village of Luhari. 35 other villages in the Daman-Ganga area were attacked by Adivasi protestors on that day.

While the Indian troops were supportive of the liberation struggle, the Morarji Desai-led Indian National Congress was wary of allowing Communists to lead the struggle. The CPI was the biggest federal opposition party at the time and the government was anxious to contain its sphere of influence. Top leaders, including Comrade Roopji Kadu, were arrested from Silvassa and the Special Reserve Police was deployed at the borders to not allow Communist detachments to enter. Instead, it was the RSS that led the charge into the city of Silvassa, which by now had made arrangements to receive 150 trained militants from Poona.

=== Invasion of Silvassa ===
After Naroly had been captured, there were rumours that thousands of Warli communists, as well as UFG fighters, were planning an attack on Silvassa. The Portuguese police retreated to Silvassa, leaving only five officers to protect the village of Piparia – a village north of Silvassa and bordering the Indian village of Lavachha. The rebels, led by volunteers of the RSS and the AGD, took this opportunity to cross the river and capture Piparia.

Captain Fidalgo of the Portuguese police was asked by the rebels (led by Karmalkar) to surrender. When there was no response from the captain, three RSS units and one AGD unit decided to march towards Silvassa. All three units moved in from three different directions towards Silvassa. Fidalgo fled south to the village of Khanvel with 150 police personnel, leaving the rebels with no resistance as they entered Silvassa. On 2 August 1954 the territories of Dadra and Nagar Haveli were declared independent. The RSS's Kajrekar was placed in charge of the administration, while the AGD's Lavande was put in charge of the treasury.

=== Surrender of Captain Fidalgo ===
Rumours were circulating that Portuguese reinforcements were coming to Nagar Haveli from Goa via Daman, so Kajrekar immediately contacted Nagarwala and requested a wireless set to enable the rebels to keep in contact with the Indian SRP Headquarters. The wireless set obtained from the Indian SRP was installed in one of the houses by the riverside. Bandu Karkhanis, an RSS volunteer, who knew how to operate the wireless set was put in charge. He was under instructions that in case of an emergency, he should throw the set in the river, cross the river and take shelter in the Indian territory which was just nearby and protected by Indian SRP.

Captain Fidalgo, who was moving deep in Nagar Haveli with his 150 men, was constantly followed by the rebels. While the Portuguese set up rearguard defences on the river bank, the Indian volunteer forces crossed the flooded river with local ferries on 10 August, assaulting the Portuguese forces at Khanvel and forcing them to retreat. The Portuguese unit eventually surrendered to the SRP at Ulad (Udva) on 11 August 1954.

At a public meeting, Karmalkar was chosen as the first administrator of Dadra and Nagar Haveli.

== Integration into India ==
The integration of Dadra and Nagar Haveli into India was not recognised by any other countries before 1974. In the 12 April 1960, International Court of Justice decision on the "Case Concerning Right of Passage Over Indian Territory", it was stated that Portugal had sovereign rights over the territories of Dadra and Nagar Haveli but India had the right to deny passage to armed personnel of Portugal over Indian territories. The residents of the former colony requested the administrative help from the Government of India. In response, K.G. Badlani, an officer of the Indian Administrative Service (IAS) was sent as the administrator.

From 1954 to 1961, the territory was administered as Free Dadra and Nagar Haveli by a body called the Varishta Panchayat of Free Dadra and Nagar Haveli.

During the years the territories enjoyed de facto independence, mail from Dadra and Nagar Haveli was routed through the Indian town of Vapi close to the border. Initially, remaining stocks of stamps of Portuguese India were overprinted with "LIBERATED AREAS" in two lines. A single revenue stamp was also issued by Free Dadra and Nagar Haveli.

In 1961, when Indian forces took over Goa, Daman, and Diu, Badlani was designated the Prime Minister of Dadra and Nagar Haveli for one day. This was done so that as Head of Government, he could sign an agreement with the Prime Minister of India, Jawaharlal Nehru, and formally merge Dadra and Nagar Haveli with the Republic of India. This was done by the Tenth Amendment of the Constitution of India.

The territory was only recognised as part of the Indian Union, together with all the other former Portuguese possessions, after the Carnation Revolution of 1974 when Portugal recognised Indian sovereignty. A treaty was signed on 31 December 1974 between India and Portugal on recognition of India's sovereignty over Goa, Daman, Diu, Dadra and Nagar Haveli.

Until 2006, Portugal continued to grant Portuguese citizenship to all natives of Dadra and Nagar Haveli who wished to have it. In that year, this was amended to include only those who had been born before 19 December 1961.
