= Kadamba Transport Corporation =

State owned transport company in India

Kadamba Transport Corporation Limited (KTCL)

Overview
- Owner: Government of Goa
- Locale: Goa
- Transit type: Intercity bus service within state of Goa and selected cities
- Chief executive: Vacant (Managing Director)
- Website: ktclgoa.com

Operation
- Began operation: 1980
- Number of vehicles: 651 (2025–26)
System map
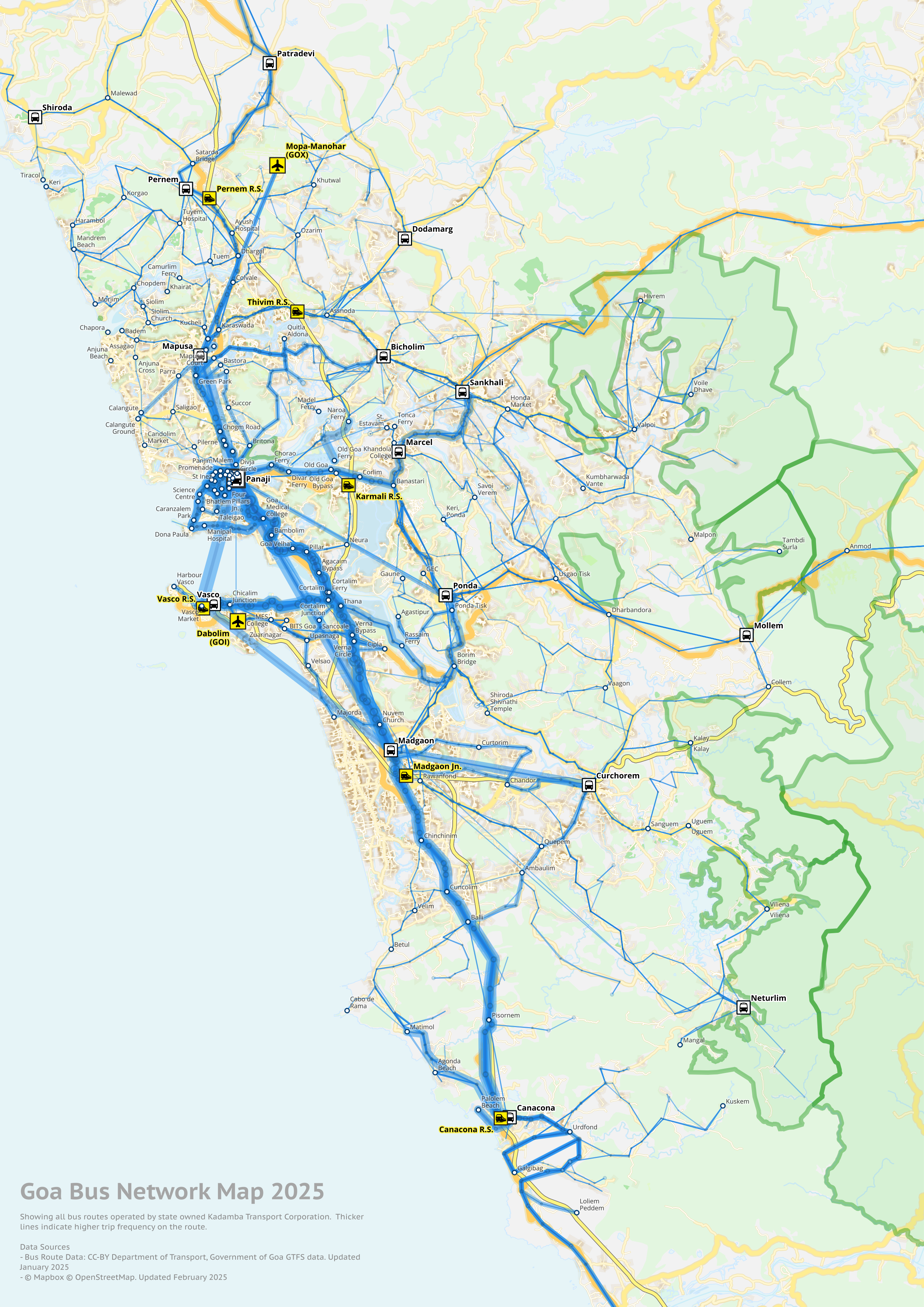
Map showing the bus route network of Goa using public data. Bus route lines are scaled by trip count.

Kadamba Transport Corporation (Konkani: कदंब येरादारी म्हामंडळ), abbreviated as KTC, is a Government of Goa road transport undertaking. It was set up in 1980 by then Chief Minister Pratapsingh Rane. Goa has long been dependent on privatised bus-transport, and the blue-and-red-and-white Kadamba buses are an exception to this rule. While the KTC has provided transport and connectivity to Goa's main towns and rural hinterland, it has also, in recent years, faced charges of mismanagement, politicisation and corruption in some of its deals.

The corporation is named after the Kadambas of Goa and the royal lion emblem of the Kadambas is used a logo on its buses. The lion emblem logo became an integral part of KTCL since its inception in 1980 when the corporation was set up to provide better public transport service.

In 2015–16, KTC had a total traffic revenue of 87.33 crore.

== Objective ==
Kadamba Transport Corporation was created to provide "safe, reliable, time-saving, efficient, comfortable and affordable" services for Goa's multitude (See KTC's citizens' charter Wayback Machine ). To a large extent, it is seen as having accomplished this objective, although the cost for providing this service has been substantial. It is heavily subsidized by the government and is reportedly in the red, like most of India's state run road transport undertakings.

== Bus stands ==
The KTC operates 15 bus stands and 4 depots covering almost all of Goa's cities and towns. Their services cover the length and breadth of Goa. The ticket prices are reasonable and for intra-Goa travel are purchased on the bus itself from the onboard bus conductor. These buses tend to be packed with passengers during peak hours and there are some non-stop "shuttle" mini-bus services as well, connecting cities like Panjim, Margao, Vasco and Ponda. Like the other bus services in Goa, they have special rates for children, students and senior citizens.

== Shuttle services ==
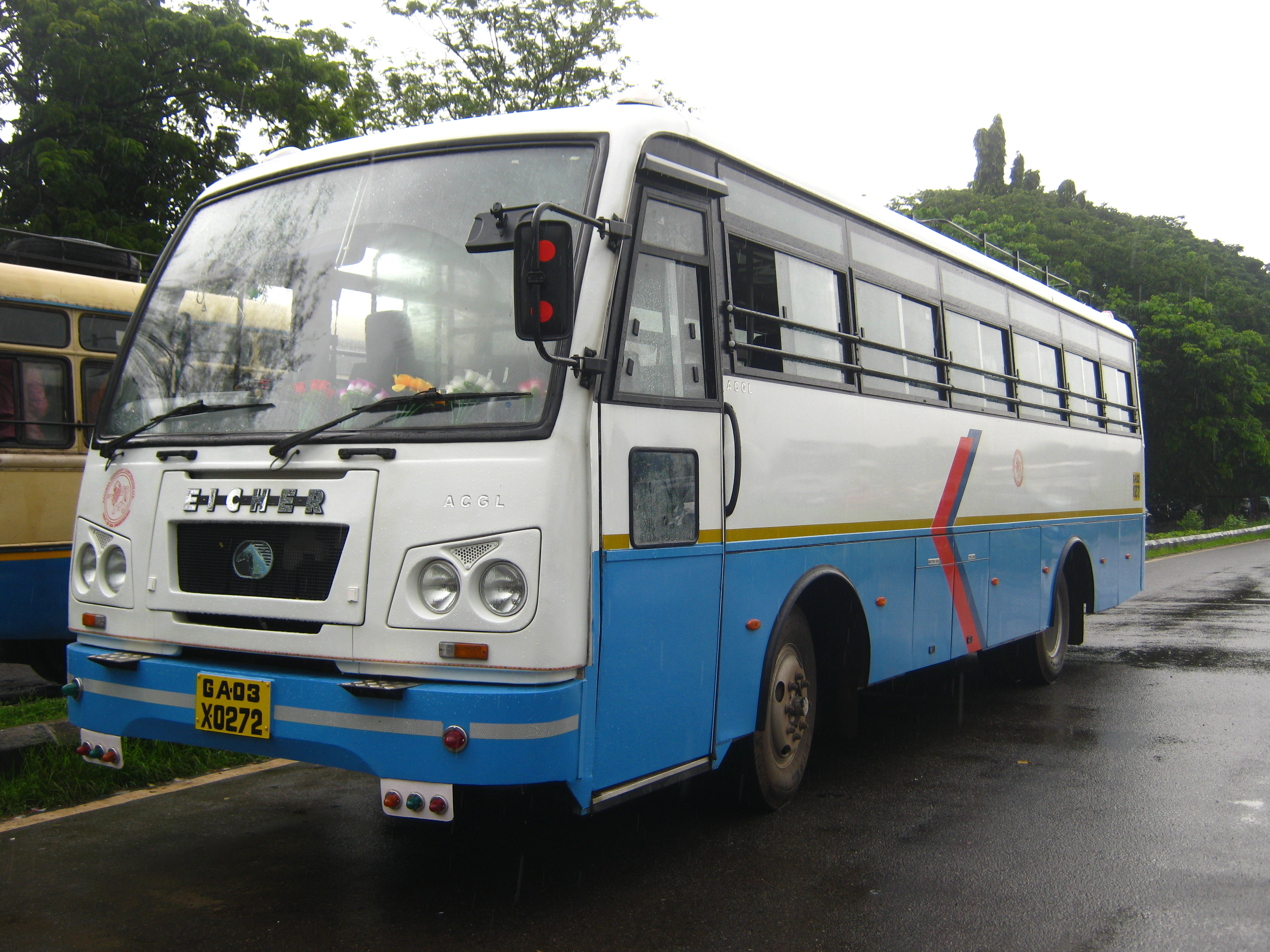
Kadamba Transport Corporation Eicher 10.90 bus

KTC provides point-to-point services through what it calls "mini/midi buses" connecting the major commercial towns such as Panjim, Margao, Vasco, Mapusa, Ponda, Curchorem and Belgaum. These services have less waiting time and only seating passengers with additional facility of drop into the city during office timing.

== Pilgrimage services ==
- KTC offers its Ashtavinayaka Tours, by air-conditioned buses, during the weekends. The Chintamani of the Thevur, Mayureshwar of Morgao, Sidhivinayak of [mumbai], Mahaganpati of Ranjangao, Vighneshawar of Ozar, Girijatmak of Lenyadri, Varadvinayak of Mahad, Ballaleshwar of Pali are among the places covered. The tour covers 1,600 km (990 mi) and costs Rs 2500 per person. Booking can be done at booking offices at bus-stands or at depots of the KTC.
- Velankanni pilgrimages to the shrine at Nagapattinam in Tamil Nadu are also conducted by KTC during the novena and feast. Booking needs to be done in advance.

== School services ==
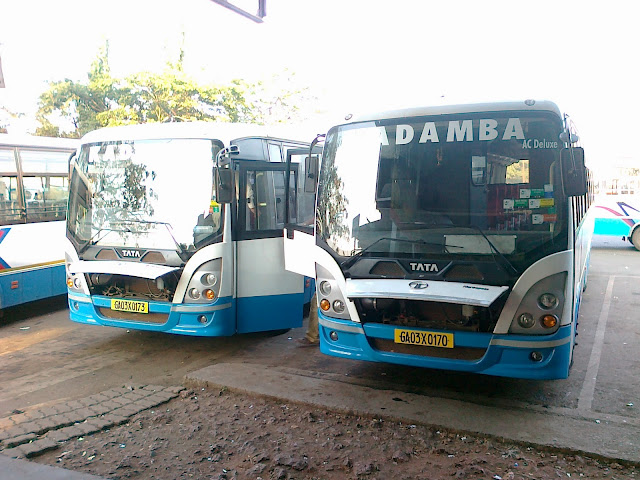
Kadamba Tata Marcopolo Starbus Ultra AC Deluxe at the Margao Bus Station in Margao

KTC also operates special services for schools, at their convenience and needs. The services are operated on the monthly passes issued to the students based on the amount collected by the school management. The services are offered to the following schools:

- Our Lady of Rosary High School Donapaula
- Sharada Mandir High School Miramar
- Kendriya Vidyalaya I.N.S. Mandovi Verem
- Hegdewar High School Panaji
- Sanjay School Porvorim
- Vidhya Prabhodini High school Porvorim
- St. Joseph High School Verna
- Regina Mundi High School Vasco
- St. Theresa High School Vasco
- Don Bosco High School Netravali
- Almeida High School, Ponda (run by Goa Vidyaprasarak Mandal)

For interstate travel however, it is highly recommended that tickets be purchased reasonably well in advance especially during the summer and winter rush and the tourist seasons. This is in spite of special services running during these times.

== Hiring of buses ==
KTC also hires out its air-conditioned Volvo, luxury, semi-luxury, mini-bus and air-conditioned mini-bus vehicles on both "round contract" and "drop contract" at varying rates. Students can access these services, at a concessional rate of two rupees less per kilometre. Minimum amount charged for the trip varies, depending on the class and size of the vehicle.

== Financial structure ==
Official sources (KTC, citizen's charter, 2007) say the entire share capital of the company—totalling Rs 299 million—is held by the Government of Goa. The capital has been invested to build infrastructure—like constructing depots, bus-stands, central workshops, and acquire buses.

== Administration ==
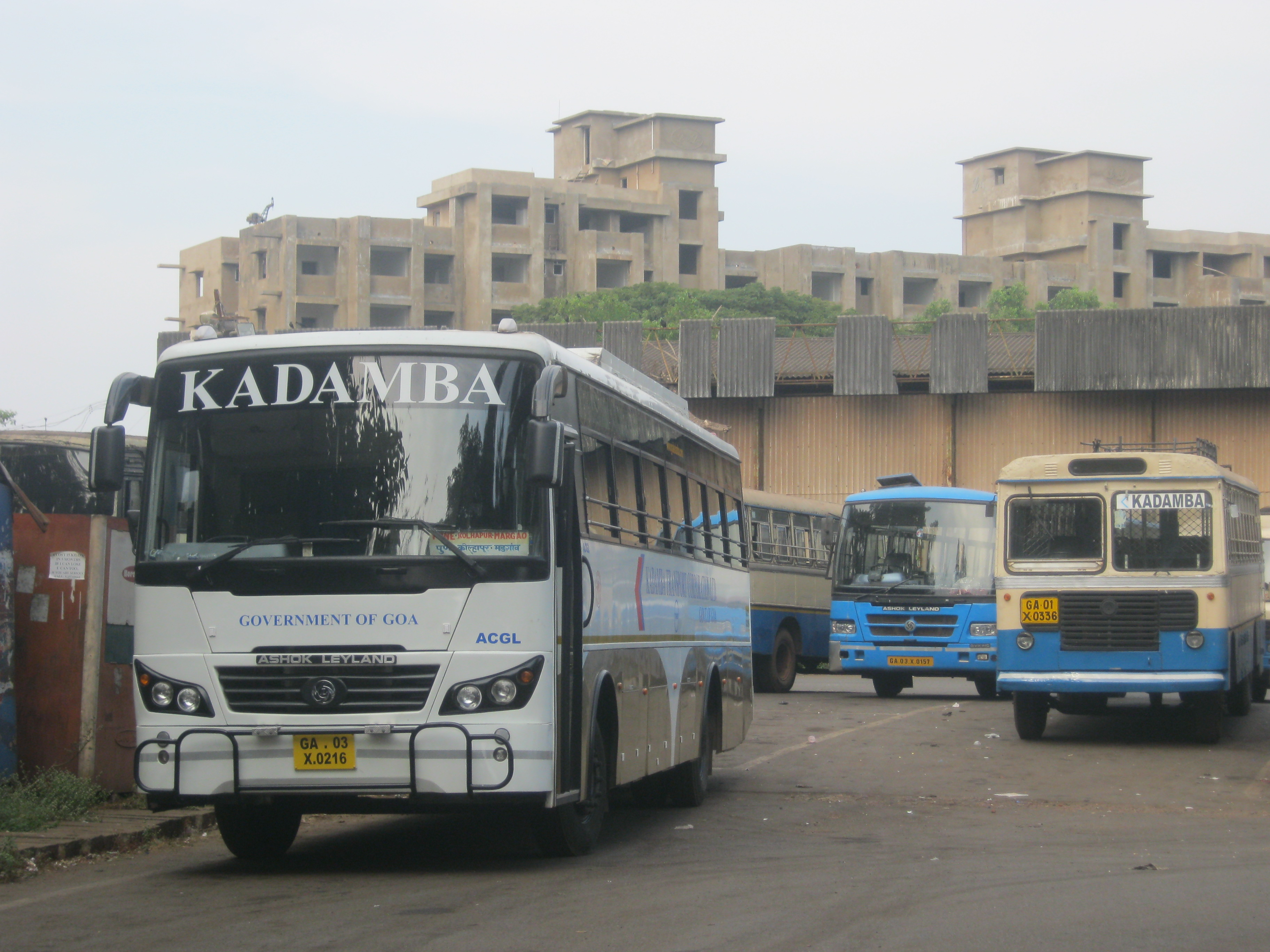
A KTC Ashok Leyland 12M luxury bus at Margao

Ulhas Tuenkar, the Bharatiya Janata Party legislator from Navelim is the Chairman of Kadamba Transport Corporation. The managing director post of the corporation is currently vacant.

== Fleet ==
As of early 2026 the fleet includes 480 diesel powered vehicles and 171 electric AC buses.

KTC plans to procure 100 more electric buses in 2026.

KTC operated 450 diesel buses and 93 electric buses as of November 2024. It also runs around 20 electric city buses in Panaji city, made by PMI Mobility.

It ran around fifty Olectra-BYD K9 electric buses assembled by Olectra Greentech (MEIL Group) as of January 2022. Thirty buses were put into use from June 2021. Twenty electric buses were delivered in December 2021.

The fleet includes diesel buses made Tata, Ashok Leyland, Eicher Motors, Corona (Deccan Auto), Volvo and electric buses made by Olectra and PMI Mobility.

According to its 2005 citizen's charter, it operated 87,690 kilometres per day, but concedes that it is "unable to meet the entire demand of public transport". It stated that the liberalisation policy and the amendment in the Indian Motor Vehicles Act 1988 together with the "increasing input cost in terms of material and labour" has had a "direct impact" on the KTC's cost of operation.
