= Navelim =

- Census town
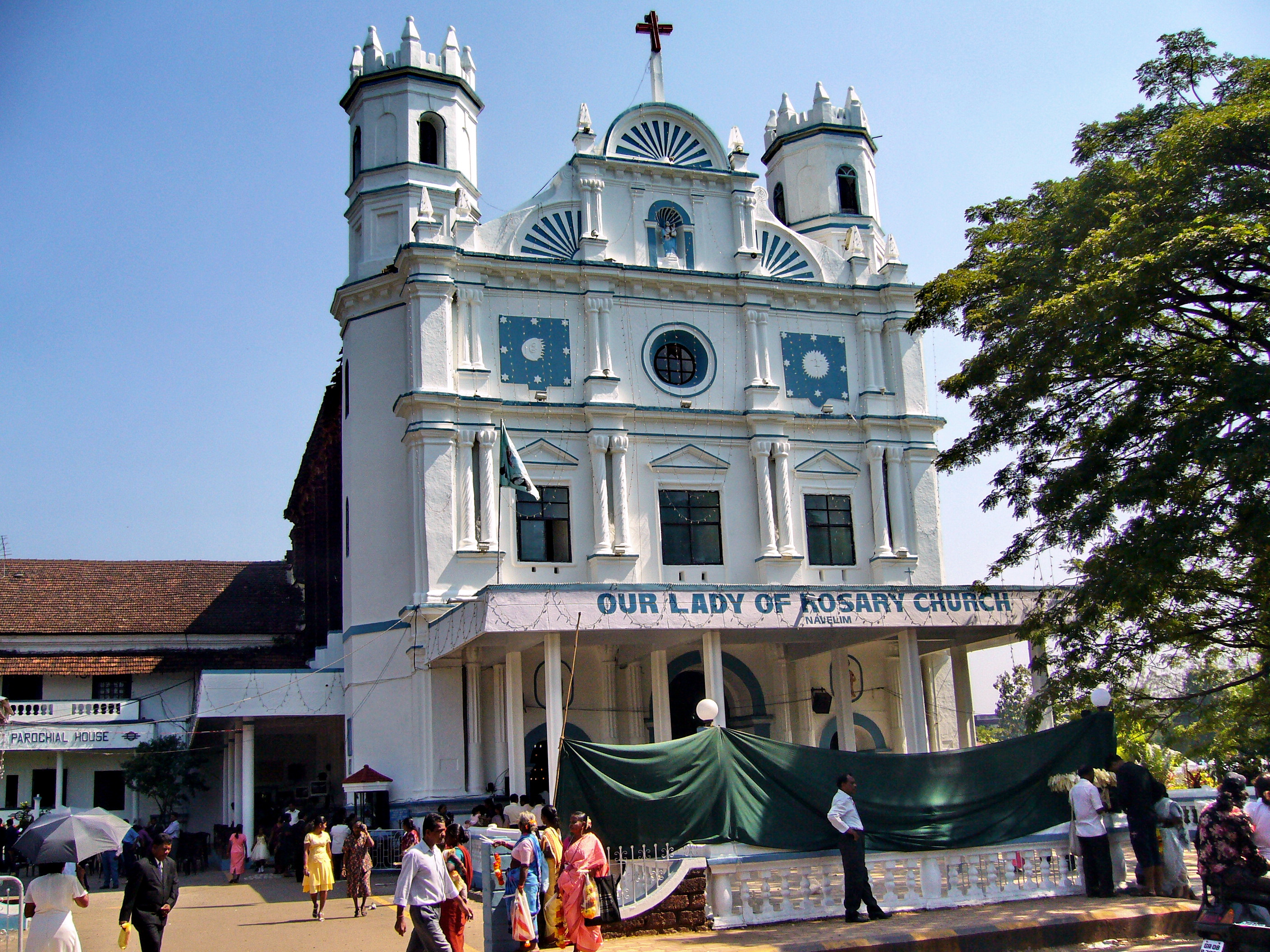
- Facade of the church, 2007

- Location of Navelim in Goa Navelim (India)
- Coordinates: 15°15′23″N 73°58′07″E
- Country: India
- State: Goa
- District: South Goa
- Sub-district: Salcete

Population (2011)
  - Total: 12,323
- Time zone: UTC+5:30 (IST)
- Postcode: 403707
- Area code: 0832
- Vehicle registration: GA-08

Navelim is a census town and suburb of the city of Margao located in the Salcete sub-district of South Goa district, Goa, India.

== History ==
Navelim's church was first built by the Jesuits in the 1590s; the present, Portuguese-style whitewashed structure was constructed later on when the older building became too small. The reconstruction was apparently financed by a local merchant "Barreto" who was saved from bankruptcy through the intercession of Our Lady of the Rosary.

According to legend, this church was built in mud similar to the other churches in Salcete between 1594 and 1598. The builders were Jesuits and it was financed by the villagers. The first parish priest of Navelim Church was a French Jesuit Fr. John Sena. (Mitras Lusitanas no Oriente)

As time passed, the church became too small for the growing population. Later on, it was reconstructed with laterite stones on a larger scale by a rich Goan merchant, whose name is not given.

This merchant, according to legend, while passing through the main road running in front of the above church, received the message that he would lose a substantial amount of money in his business. As soon as he received this message, he entered the church and started praying to Our Lady of Rosary, requesting her to relieve him from this catastrophe. If his prayers were answered, he promised to reconstruct the original church, on a larger scale. In the event he not only recovered what he had lost, but realised double the amount. He then financed the entire reconstruction of the church and also renewed the statue of our Lady of Rosary. Information on further reconstruction of Navelim church, if any, ls not known.

== Celebrations ==
=== Navelim Feast ===
The celebration of the feast of Our Lady of Rosary begins every third Wednesday in November. This devotion of Our Lady consists of an extensive celebration which begins with traditional processions and novenas.

Each year the family selected to celebrate the feast paints the church on the outside fifteen days before the feast. The inside of the church is also decorated and the outside is covered with fairy lights. Most of the houses and streets in the village are decorated with colourful lights during the celebrations.

Every four years, the statue of Our Lady of Rosary is brought down from the altar and a procession takes Her to Holy Rosary School where mass is held in the playground. During this one day consecration of Our Lady, children from the school act out scenes from the Bible and the playground is filled with crowds of villagers.

Every November a candlelight procession carries a statue of Our Lady towards the church; the celebration of the feast continues for several days.

=== Navelim fair ===
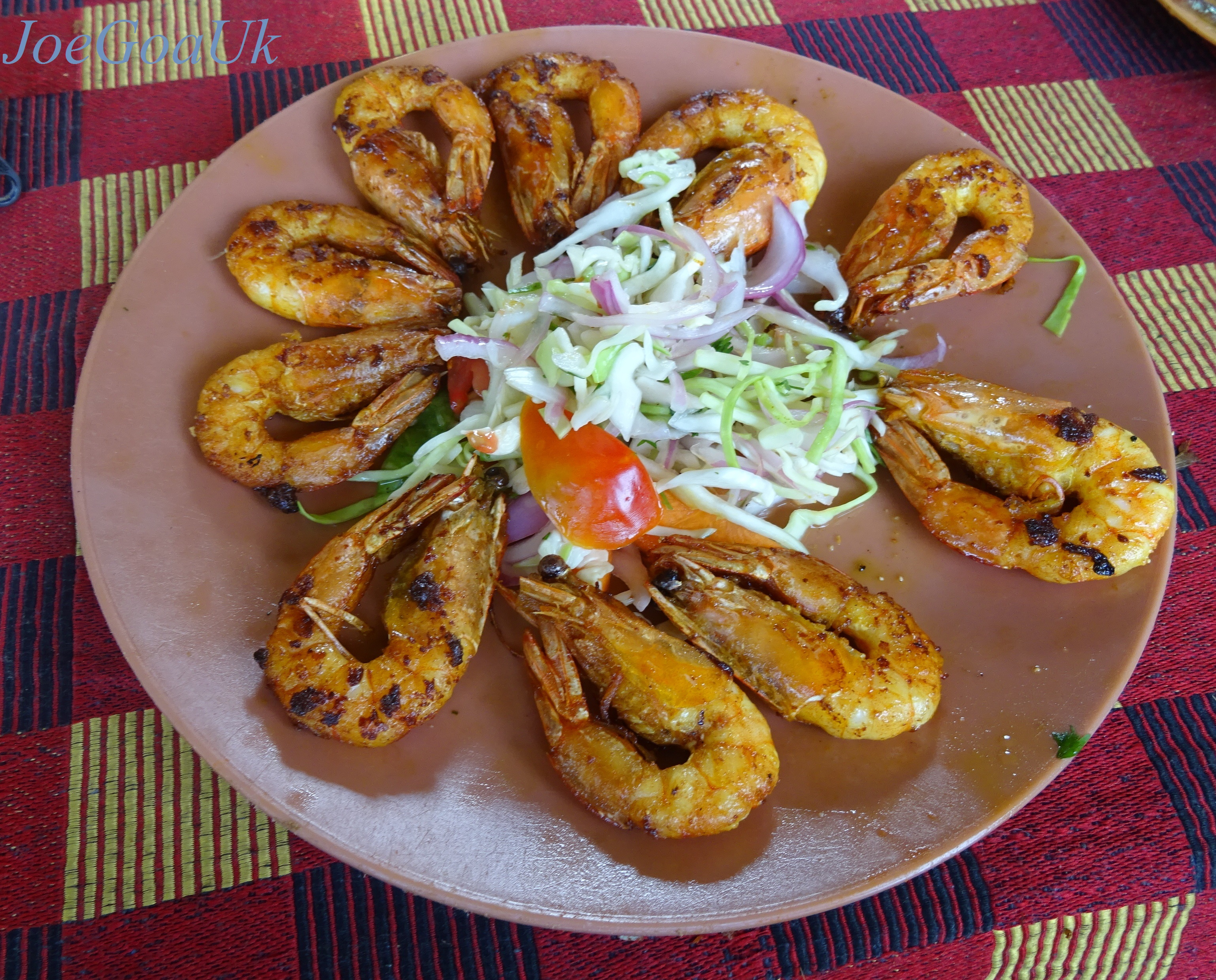
Food, Navelim-style. From a local restaurant.

According to local beliefs, in earlier times, this fair consisted mainly of three or four sheds and lasted only for a day, because there was a superstition that on the same night of the feast day, there was a gathering of devils in the area in front of the church.

Dr. Francisco Salvador Gomes, the father of the prominent figure Dr. Francisco Luís Gomes, who was the administrator of Salcete, encouraged some of the owners of the sheds to extend the fair to three days. This was done, and fair gained in prominence so that today it is the most popular fair in Goa (Ultramar of 12-11-1869 no. 554 and Ultramar of 10-11-1900 year 42).

Today the fair consists of stalls that sell toys, food and clothing. There are booths for games as well as a fun fair with merry-go-rounds and Ferris wheels as well as other enjoyable rides.

== Demographics ==
Navelim has population of 12 323 of which 6 875 are males while 5 448 are females as per report released by Census India 2011. It was formerly a large village of Salcete and is now one of the most populous towns in South Goa.

== Educational Institutions ==
Rosary College of Commerce and Arts is one of the most famous colleges in Goa. Beside's arts and commerce it also offers other courses like BBA (Bachelor of Business Administration), BCA (Bachelor of Computer Applications), M.Com etc. Rosary Higher Secondary, Rosary School and Perpetual Succour Convent are also located in that area.

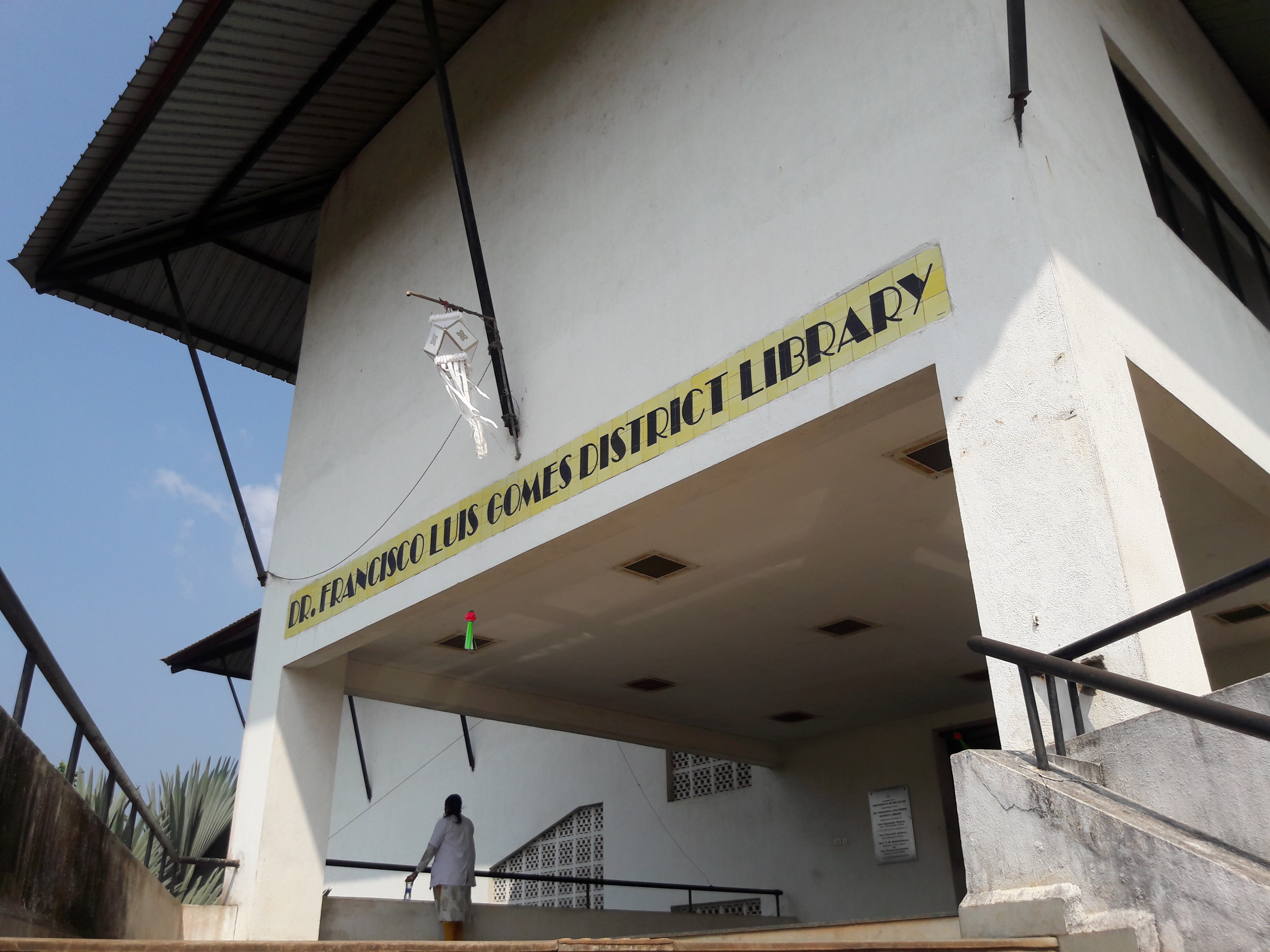
Navelim is home to the largest library in the South Goa district, the Dr. Francisco Luis Gomes District Library.

South Goa district's largest library, the District Library located at Navelim, is named after doctor Francisco Luis Gomes, who was a prominent Goan parliamentarian during Portuguese times, in the mid-nineteenth century, and an intellectual. The foundation stone for the library was laid on February 5, 2007 and this institution was itself inaugurated on November 21, 2010. It also has facilities for children and neo-literates.

Library timings are Monday to Friday: 9 am. to 7 pm. Saturday and Sunday: 9.30 am. to 5.45 pm. It is closed on public holidays.

== Landmarks ==
Navelim is rapidly expanding to become one of Margão's fastest growing suburban areas. Other landmarks include the railway station and the infamous Sky Bus. It has the Annual Festas de Leques.

== Subdivisions ==
Navelim is one of the largest villages in Goa. Some of the names of Navelim wards are: Aquem, Belem, Buticas, Coldem, Colmoroda, Danddo, Dialgona, Dongorim, Firgulem, Fradilem, Mandopa, Modi, Nagmodem, Ratvaddo, Rawanfond, Sinquetim, Sirvodem, Telaulim. Dicarpali

== Representation in the State Assembly ==
At the state level, Navelim falls within the Navelim Assembly constituency. As of May 1988, the Navelim constituency covered the villages of Varca, Orlim, Sirlim, Dramapur, Dicarpale, Davorlim, Aquem, Talaulim and Navelim in the Margao sub-division of the Salcete taluka.

As of March 2022, its representative in the Goa Legislative Assembly is Ulhas Tuenkar of the Bharatiya Janata Party.

== River Sal Project ==
In February 2018, the Government of India sanctioned a Rs 61.74 crore project (to be borne by the Centre and the State on a 60:40 basis) "to control pollution in [the] River Sal at Navelim town, Goa". It was approved by the Union Ministry of Environment, forest & Climate Change under the National River Conservation Plan or NRCP.

Under the project, about 32 kms of sewers were to be laid and a sewage treatment plant of three million litres per mday (MLD) to be constructed. It was scheduled to be completed by January 2021. News reports said this would "help in reduction of [the] pollution load in the river Sal and [the] improvement in its water quality, besides improving the environment and sanitation in the town".

It was also expected to "take care of [the] entire catchment area of the river through measures like rejuvenation of lakes and wetlands, construction of a small-check dam to ensure continuous water flow and afforestation".

In the year 2015, news reports said, the Central Pollution Control Board or CPCB, had identified the Sal river stretch at Navelim as "one of the 302 polluted river stretches across the country based on Biochemical Oxygen Demand (BOD) levels" which indicate organic pollution and water quality.

== Sport ==
Navelim has a football ground. It was constructed with the financial support of the people of Navelim abroad and living in Navelim.

The Our Lady Of Enfermous Sports Club Football ground situated at Sinquetim is one of the best ground in Goa. Finals of Imperial Cup and other tournaments have been played on this ground.

== Notable people ==
- Francisco Luís Gomes (1829–1869): statesman and linguist represented Goa in the Portuguese Parliament in Lisbon.
- Cardinal Valerian Gracias (1900–1978): former archbishop of Mumbai.
- Luizinho Faleiro, ex-minister and former Chief Minister of Goa

== Government and politics ==
Navelim is part of Navelim (Goa Assembly constituency) and South Goa (Lok Sabha constituency).
