= M. N. Srinivas =

Indian anthropologist and sociologist (1916–1999)

Padma Bhushan M. N. Srinivas HonFBA
- Born: 16 November 1916; Mysore, Kingdom of Mysore, British India (now in Karnataka, India)
- Died: 30 November 1999 (aged 83); Bangalore (now Bengaluru), Karnataka, India
- Spouse: Rukmini Srinivas
- Awards: Padma Bhushan (1977)

Academic background
- Education: University of Oxford, University of Mumbai
- Influences: Alfred Radcliffe-Brown

Academic work
- Discipline: Sociology, Social Anthropology
- Main interests: Indian Society, Caste system in India
- Notable works: The Remembered Village, Indian Society through Personal Writings, Village, Caste, Gender and Method: Essays in Indian Social Anthropology
- Notable ideas: Sanskritization, Inter and intra-caste solidarity

Mysore Narasimhachar Srinivas (16 November 1916 – 30 November 1999) was an Indian sociologist and social anthropologist. He is mostly known for his work on caste and caste systems, social stratification, Sanskritisation and Westernisation in southern India and the concept of 'dominant caste'. He is considered to be one of the pioneering personalities in the field of sociology and social anthropology in India as his work in Rampura (later published as The Remembered Village) remains one of the early examples of ethnography in India. That was in contrast to most of his contemporaries of the Bombay School, who focused primarily on a historical methodology to conduct research, mainly in Indology. He also founded the Department of Sociology at the Delhi School of Economics, University of Delhi in 1959.

== Biography ==
Srinivas was born in a Hebbar Iyengar family on 16 November 1916.

Srinivas earned his doctorate in sociology from the University of Bombay (later renamed as University of Mumbai) and went to All Souls College, University of Oxford for his fellowship. Although, he had already written a book on family and marriage in Mysore, his training there played a significant role in the development of his ideas. Srinivas taught in various institutions of repute like University of Delhi, Maharaja Sayajirao University of Baroda, Institute for Social and Economic Change, Bangalore and National Institute of Advanced Studies, Bangalore.

He died on 30 November 1999 at Bangalore, two weeks after his 83rd birthday.

== Contribution to Indian sociology and social anthropology ==
In a Frontline obituary, Parvathi Menon described him as India's most distinguished sociologist and social anthropologist. His contribution to the disciplines of sociology and social anthropology and to public life in India was unique. It was his capacity to break out of the strong mould in which (the mostly North American university oriented) area studies had been shaped after the end of the Second World War on the one hand, and to experiment with the disciplinary grounding of social anthropology and sociology on the other, which marked his originality as a social scientist.

It was the conjuncture between Sanskritic scholarship and the strategic concerns of the Western Bloc in the aftermath of the Second World War which largely shaped South Asian area studies in the United States. During the colonial era, the Brahmins or Pandits were acknowledged as important interlocutors of Hindu laws and customs to the British colonial administration. The colonial assumptions about an unchanging Indian society led to the curious assemblage of Sanskrit studies with contemporary issues in most South Asian departments in the US and elsewhere. It was strongly believed that an Indian sociology must lie at the conjunction of Indology and sociology.

Srinivas' scholarship was to challenge that dominant paradigm for understanding Indian society and would in the process, usher newer intellectual frameworks for understanding Hindu society. His views on the importance of caste in the electoral processes in India are well known. While some have interpreted this to attest to the enduring structural principles of social stratification of Indian society, for Srinivas these symbolised the dynamic changes that were taking place as democracy spread and electoral politics became a resource in the local world of village society.

By inclination, he was not given to utopian constructions: his ideas about justice, equality and eradication of poverty were rooted in his experiences on the ground. His integrity in the face of demands that his sociology should take into account the new and radical aspirations was one of the most moving aspects of his writing. By the use of terms such as Sanskritisation, "dominant caste", "vertical (inter-caste) and horizontal (intra-caste) solidarities", Srinivas sought to capture the fluid and dynamic essence of caste as a social institution.

== Methodology ==
As part of his methodological practice, Srinivas strongly advocated ethnographic research based on Participant observation, but his concept of fieldwork was tied to the notion of locally bounded sites. Some of his work, such as a paper on dominant caste and another on a joint family dispute, was largely inspired by his direct participation (and as a participant observer) in rural life in south India. He wrote several papers on the themes of national integration, issues of gender, new technologies, etc. His methodology and findings have been used and emulated by successive researchers who have studied caste in India.

His The Remembered Village (1976) is considered a classic in this field. It is a study based on the 11 months he spent in the village in 1948 and on subsequent visits until 1964.

== Recognition ==
He received many honours from the University of Bombay, the Royal Anthropological Institute, and the Government of France; in 1977, he has received the Padma Bhushan from the President of India; and he was the honorary foreign member of three academies: the British Academy, the American Academy of Arts and Sciences, and the American Philosophical Society. National Translation Mission of the Ministry of Human Resource Development of Government of India has selected his works, Social Change in Modern India and Caste in Modern India for translation into Indian languages. The latter one has already been published in Maithili language.

== Attributional approaches to caste ==
Scholars using the "attributional approach" stress the attributes of a caste. However, each of them lays emphasis on one or other of these attributes and how they affect interaction. Srinivas' writing in the 1950s centers on the structure of relations arising between castes on the basis of these attributes and the dynamic aspect of caste identity. Before the concept of Sanskritization Srinivas put forth the concept of Brahminization where the lower caste adopted the practices of the Brahmins to improve their social status. During his study of north India Srinivas observed that the lower castes adopted the practices of the upper castes and not only Brahmins and so he called the concept as Sanskritization.

This aspect becomes clearer in Srinivas's work on positional mobility known as 'Sanskritization'. Sanskritization is a process whereby a caste attempts to raise its rank within the caste hierarchy by adopting the practice, the attributes of the caste or castes above them, in the rank order. This is to say the 'low' attributes are gradually dropped and the 'high' attributes of the castes above them are imitated. This involves adoption of vegetarianism, clean occupations and so on. Closely connected is the concept of dominant caste. The dominant caste in a village is conspicuous by its:

1. Sizeable numerical presence
2. Ownership of land
3. Political power
4. Access to western education
5. Jobs in administration
6. Place in local caste hierarchy

== Books ==
- Marriage and Family in Mysore (1942)
- Religion and Society Among the Coorgs (1952)
- Caste in Modern India and other essays (1962), Asia Publishing House
- The Remembered Village (1976, reissued by OUP in 2013)
- Indian Society through Personal Writings (1998)
- Village, Caste, Gender and Method (1998)
- Social Change in Modern India (1966)
- The Dominant Caste and Other Essays (ed.)(1986)
- Dimensions of Social Change in India(1977)
- On Living in a Revolution and Other Essays (1993)
