= Tenth Amendment (disambiguation) =

The Tenth Amendment may refer to the:

- Tenth Amendment to the United States Constitution, part of the Bill of Rights
- Tenth Amendment of the Constitution of India, which incorporated Dadra and Nagar Haveli
- Tenth Amendment of the Constitution of Ireland, which permitted the state to ratify the Single European Act
  - Tenth Amendment of the Constitution Bill 1986, a failed attempt to amend the Constitution of Ireland
- Tenth Amendment of the Constitution of South Africa
