= Bala Raya Mapari =

Indian independence activist (1929–1955)

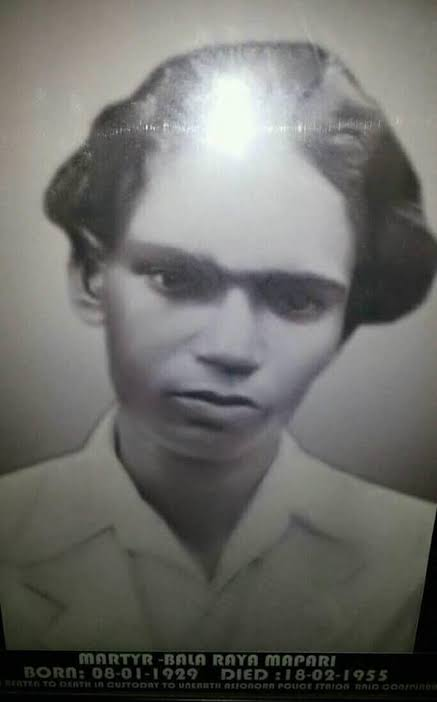
- Born: 8 January 1929; Assonora, Portuguese Goa
- Died: 18 February 1955 (aged 26)
- Organisation: Azad Gomantak Dal
- Known for: First martyr of the Goan independence movement
- Movement: Goan independence movement

Bala Raya Mapari (8 January 1929 – 18 February 1955) was an Indian independence activist from Goa. He was an active member of the Azad Gomantak Dal, a revolutionary organization that campaigned against Portuguese colonial rule in the region. Mapari died in police custody in February 1955 after being subjected to physical torture by the Portuguese authorities. He is considered as the first martyr of the later phase of the independence movement.

== Personal life ==
Mapari's father, Raya, was a farmer. Mapari was from Asnoda and was married to Indravati. Together, they had a daughter named Sakhu. As a schoolboy, he was influenced to be patriotic by his teacher, Gawas.

== Activism and death ==
Mapari was a mine worker who joined the arms training camp of the Azad Gomantak Dal (AGD) in Amboli, Sindhudurg, in 1953, after coming in contact with some AGD revolutionaries. Following this, he used this training in actvities against the Portuguese.

On 11 February 1953, the AGD attacked the Portuguese police station located in Asnoda to steal the arms and ammunition there. However, due to the superior numbers and strength of the police force, the colonial authorities successfully captured all the revolutionaries involved in the operation. Agente Casmiro Monteiro caught Mapari, tied himto his jeep and dragged him from Asnoda to Bicholim.

Following his arrest in February 1955, the police subjected Mapari to severe physical torture in an attempt to extract information regarding the identities and whereabouts of his fellow nationalists. Mapari consistently refused to cooperate or disclose any details about his comrades, which led to further aggravated beatings.

Monteiro severely beat up Mapari at the Mapusa police station, leaving Mapari bruised and bleeding severely. He was produced in an unconscious state at the military hospital in Campal. However, as a result of the severe trauma and injuries sustained during the interrogation, he died on 18 February 1955.

Bala's cousin Rohidas Mapari was also a member of the AGD and was similarly tortured by Monteiro and died from his injuries on 28 September 1956.

== Honours ==
On 18 June 1983, the Government of Goa and the Government of India jointly recognized Mapari's sacrifices by posthumously honouring him with a Tamrapatra (a ceremonial copper plaque awarded to freedom fighters).

A prominent street in Shirgao was named in his honour. Additionally, a memorial statue of Mapari has been erected in his native village of Asnoda.
