= Avertano Furtado =

Indian politician

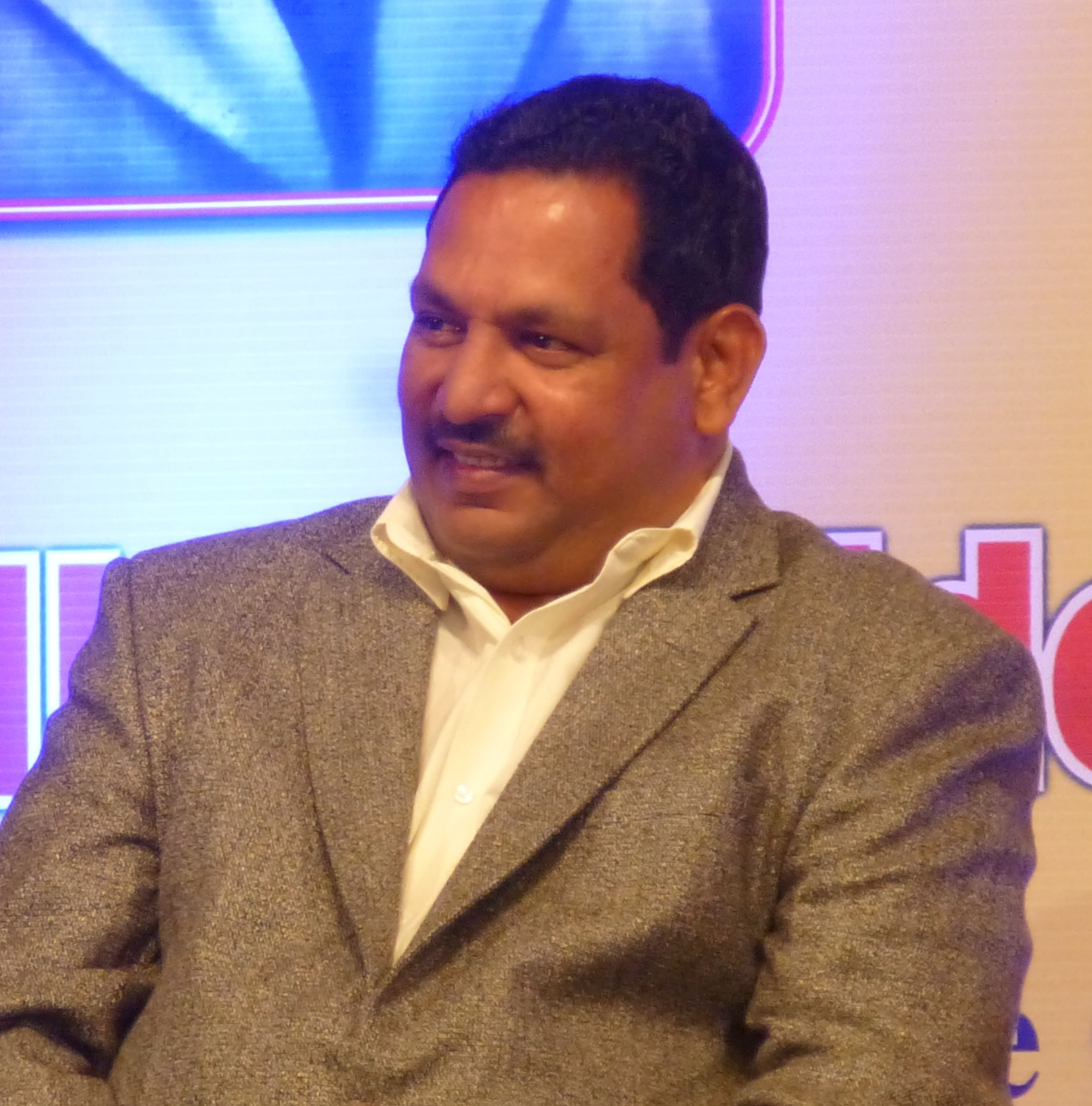
- Furtado in 2016

Minister for Labour, Employment and Fisheries
- In office April 2012 – 2017

Member of Goa Legislative Assembly
- In office March 2012 – March 2017
- Preceded by: Churchill Alemao
- Succeeded by: Luizinho Faleiro
- Constituency: Navelim

Personal details
- Party: Indian National Congress (2021–present)
- Other political affiliations: Independent (2012–2021)
- Children: 1
- Occupation: Politician
- Website: avertanofurtado.com

Avertano Furtado is an Indian politician who is a former member of the Goa Legislative Assembly, representing the Navelim Assembly constituency from 2012 to 2017. Furtado successfully contested in the 2012 Goa Legislative Assembly election, by defeating incumbent legislator Churchill Alemao by a margin of 2,145 votes.

== Career ==
Before shifting his focus to politics, Furtado played football as a goalkeeper for Salgaocar SC and MRF. Alongside several others, he petitioned the Bombay High Court on behalf of the residents of Sinquetim-Navelim, requesting a stay order on the construction of the Sinquetim-Benaulim bridge. This petition was supported by the incumbent MLA Churchill Alemao. The grounds for the petition were that the Union Ministry of Environment and Forests had not sanctioned the project, and it should not be recommended until the CRZ clearance is obtained from the ministry.
