= Prabhakar Sinari =

Indian IPS officer (born 1928)

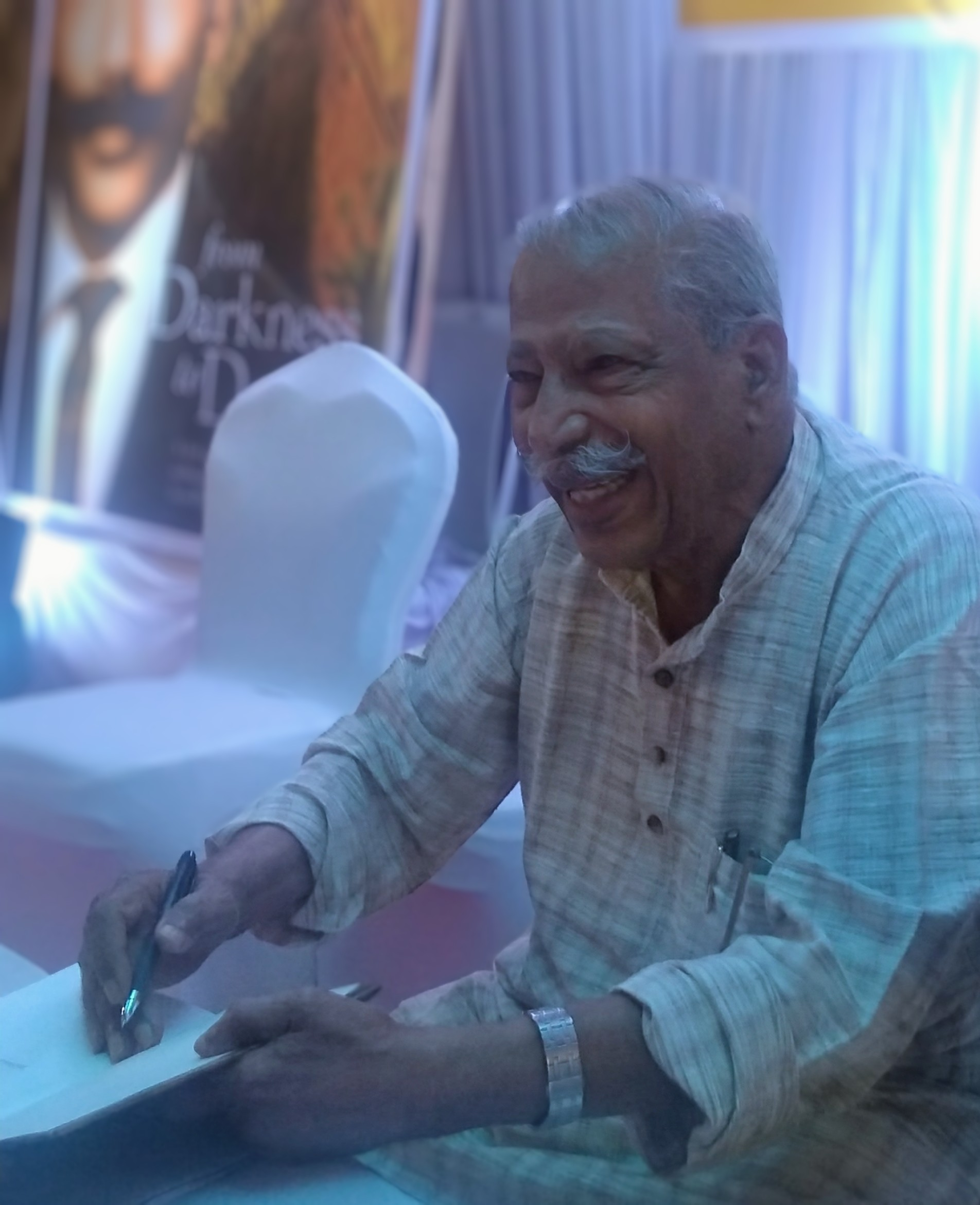
- Sinari in 2017
- Born: Prabhakar Vitthal Prabhu Sinari; 23 November 1928 (age 97); Ribandar, Portuguese Goa
- Other name: Che Guevara of Goa
- Occupation: IPS officer
- Organisation: Azad Gomantak Dal
- Known for: Indian annexation of Dadra and Nagar Haveli; Former assistant director of the R&AW
- Notable work: From Darkness to Dawn
- Movement: Goan independence movement
- Spouse: Vilasini
- Awards: Tamrapatra Award

Prabhakar Vitthal Prabhu Sinari (born 23 November 1928) is an Indian independence activist, IPS officer, former Inspector General of Police and former assistant director of the R&AW. A founding member of the Azad Gomantak Dal, he was part of the Indian annexation of Dadra and Nagar Haveli. After the Indian annexation of Goa, he became its first IPS officer and later became Goa's Inspector General of Police and then the assistant director of the R&AW.

== Early and personal life ==
Prabhakar Vitthal Prabhu Sinari was born on 23 November 1928 (Note: Aged 93 in 2021–22) in Ribandar, Portuguese Goa, to Vitthal Purushottam Prabhu Sinari. He completed his education with a Bachelor of Arts degree. From a young age, he became involved in the independence movement, actively participating in activities since 1946. Sinari's brothers, Purushottam and Dinkar, were also active in the Goan independence movement.

Sinari is married to Vilasini and lives in Caranzalem as of 2021.

== Goan independence movement ==
Sinari was an active participant in Goan independence movement. He organized processions, rallies, and public campaigns, often affixing posters to promote the movement. He was arrested on three occasions, during which he faced physical abuse, including having his head shaved as a punitive measure.

Aged 15 in June 1946, then a student at the Escola Moderna, Sinari was encouraged by a schoolteacher, Sadanand Apu Manapat, to join a peaceful protest against the arrest of Ram Manohar Lohia, amidst the events of Goa Revolution Day. However, the peaceful protestors were brutally attacked by the Portuguese police, convincing the young Sinari that the Portuguese only understood aggression.

Sinari became a founding member of the Azad Gomantak Dal (AGD), which broke away from the peaceful National Congress Goa (NCG) on 18 June 1947. Sinari and six other young men—Dattatraya Deshpande, Jaiwant Kunde, Tukaram Kankonkar, Betu Naik, Narayan Naik, and leader Vishwanath Lawande—pledged to liberate Goa through guerrilla tactics.

In July 1947, AGD attempted to attack and steal from the Portuguese treasury, Fazenda, in Mapusa. The only sentry guarding the Fazenda managed to defeat them, resulting in one Portuguese policeman being badly injured. Following this, the AGD unsuccessfully tried to rob bags of a cash from an officer of the Portuguese overseas bank, Banco Nacional Ultramarino, while in a bus at Porvorim. These actions led to increased persecution by Portuguese authorities.

Sinari was known for his use of guerrilla tactics and leadership in armed operations, earning him the nickname "Che Guevara of Goa" for his revolutionary activities and strategic acumen.

Sinari was arrested for his involvement in these revolutionary actions. Following a trial by the Portuguese Tribunal Militar Territorial, he was sentenced to 13 years of imprisonment. While in detention, he endured solitary confinement, inhumane treatment, and torture for refusing to recognize or respect the Portuguese flag.

Fearing his impending deportation, Sinari escaped from prison in Panaji in October 1952, four years after his imprisonment. In his previous attempt, he had tried to jump over the fifty-metre-high wall of the jail at Reis Magos Fort, but misjudged the fall and was recaptured and tortured. He was also later denied permission to attend his father's funeral. Over the next few days, he made his way across Taleigão, Ribandar and finally to Poira, near the Indian border. From there, he crossed the border in the jungle and reached Maneri village. From there, he went to Belgaum, where the AGD had an office. Inspired by his presence there, the volunteers planned for the liberation of Nagar Haveli.

Sinari later founded an offshoot of the AGD called the Rancour Patriótica.

== Leadership in armed operations ==
Sinari became the leader of the Northern Command, orchestrating several armed attacks against Portuguese authorities. Notable actions under his leadership included:

- The attack on the Ravan police outpost in Satari on 19 March 1955.
- The damage inflicted on a railway engine at Caranzol on 16 April 1955.
- The raid on the Salem customs post in Pernem, resulting in the seizure of arms on 26 May 1955.

He also led significant operations, including dynamiting the Shirgaon mines in October 1955 and launching a series of coordinated assaults on police outposts across Goa. These actions escalated between 1956 and 1957, with notable incidents such as:

- The February 1956 attack on the Ravan police outpost, resulting in the deaths of two policemen.
- The March 1956 raid on a trolley carrying money, which included the killing of a guard.
- The destruction of a police van transporting arms in March 1956.

Sinari also organized attacks on mines and police outposts in late 1957, under a newly formed organization based in Belgaum.

The Portuguese authorities declared a reward of ₹1 lakh for Sinari, dead or alive, and made several attempts to capture or eliminate him, including employing mercenaries. Despite being injured multiple times in armed encounters, he remained committed to the cause of Goa's liberation.

== Post-annexation of Goa ==
After the Indian annexation of Goa, Sinari was awarded the Tamrapatra by the Central Government for his contributions to the freedom struggle. His associates included people like Vishwanath Lawande, Dattatraya Deshpande, Narayan Hari Naik, Mukund Kamat Dhakankar, Mohan Ranade, and others.

In 2017, Sinari published a book detailing his 16-year involvement in the Goan independence movement, providing a factual account of his participation as a freedom fighter. The book is titled, From Darkness to Dawn.

Sinari later pursued a career as an Indian Police Service (IPS) officer, continuing his commitment to public service. He is considered as Goa's first IPS officer, and then became the Inspector General of Police (IGP) for Goa. He later went on to become the assistant director of the R&AW, through which he was responsible for the security of then Prime Minister of India, Indira Gandhi. He also had an important role against the insurgency in Punjab.

== Awards and accolades ==
Sinari was awarded the Tamrapatra by the Government of India.

In 2020, a photo panel featuring Sinari's life and career was set up at the GRP Camp of the Goa Police.

== Works ==
- From Darkness to Dawn (2017)
