= Leo Velho Mauricio =

Indian politician and lawyer (1934–2010)

- Official portrait in 1977

Member of Goa Legislative Assembly
- In office 1967–1980
- Preceded by: Alvaro de Loyola Furtado
- Succeeded by: Luizinho Faleiro
- Constituency: Navelim
- Majority: 6546 (59.50%) (Note: for the year 1967–1972; followed by the next term.); 7618 (69.77%); 4434 (49.35%)

Personal details
- Born: 7 May 1934 Chinchinim, Goa, Portuguese India, Portuguese Empire
- Died: 18 July 2010 (aged 76) Goa, India
- Party: Indian National Congress (1977–1980)
- Other political affiliations: United Goans (Sequiera Group) (1967–1977)
- Spouse: Rica Fernandes
- Education: St. Stanislaus High School (S.S.C); Karnataka University (B.A.); St. Xavier's College (M.A.)
- Occupation: Politician
- Profession: Lawyer; barrister

Leo Velho Mauricio (7 May 1934 – 18 July 2010) was an Indian politician and lawyer. He was a former member of the Goa Legislative Assembly, representing the Navelim Assembly constituency from 1967 to 1980. He was also a member of the Azad Gomantak Dal.

== Early and personal life ==
Leo Velho Mauricio was born in Chinchinim, Goa. He was a practising Roman Catholic and was married to Rica Fernandes. Mauricio completed his S.S.C at St. Stanislaus High School at Bombay (now Mumbai). He later completed his graduation in Bachelor of Arts from R.P.D. College at Belgaum (Karnataka University).

Mauricio went on to get a Masters of Arts degree from St. Xavier’s College, Bombay. He was employed as a Bar-at-law at the Honourable Society of Lincoln's Inn, London. He resided at Chinchinim, Goa.
