= Dattatraya Deshpande =

Indian independence activist (1925–1970)

- Portrait of Dattatraya Deshpande
- Born: Dattatraya Atmaram Deshpande; 27 November 1925; Rampur, Kingdom of Mysore, British India
- Died: 22 September 1970 (aged 44)
- Organization: Azad Gomantak Dal
- Movement: Goan independence movement

Dattatraya Atmaram Deshpande (27 November 1925 – 22 September 1970) was an Indian independence activist. He was a founder member of the Azad Gomantak Dal.

== Early life ==
Dattatraya Atmaram Deshpande was born on 27 November 1925, in Rampur, Chikkodi taluka, Kingdom of Mysore. He was the son of Atmaram Dattatraya Deshpande and received an SSC-level education.

== Political activism and role in independence movements ==
Deshpande was deeply involved in the Indian independence movement. He actively participated in the Quit India Movement from 1942 to 1945 and later joined the Forward Bloc, a political group led by Subhash Chandra Bose. His work with the Forward Bloc extended to Bengal, Bihar, and Odisha.

In 1946, Deshpande moved to Goa, where he became a teacher and engaged in the political activities intended to free the region from Portuguese rule. He joined prominent activists, including Ram Manohar Lohia, on 18 June 1946, Goa Revolution Day, to further the independence movement. In April 1947, he aligned with activists such as Vishwanath Lawande, Narayana H. Naik, and Prabhakar Sinari to intensify efforts against Portuguese colonial rule, and they together founded of the Azad Gomantak Dal.

== Imprisonment and resistance ==
In December 1947, Deshpande was arrested for his revolutionary activities, which included acts of defiance against Portuguese rule in Mapusa and Porvorim. In 1949, he was sentenced to 20 years of imprisonment by the Portuguese Tribunal Militar Territorial (TMT) with a provision for deportation to Africa. During his detention in jails in Margao, Panaji, Aguada, and Reis Magos, Deshpande endured inhumane treatment and torture.

To protest these conditions, he initiated a 16-day hunger strike. In response to his defiance, the Portuguese authorities declared him mentally unstable and transferred him to the Hospital Miguel Bombarda in Portugal as a violent psychiatric patient. He remained detained there until 1962 when he was finally released.

== Return to Goa and advocacy ==
Following his release, Deshpande returned to Goa and dedicated himself to supporting workers and marginalized communities. He organized labor unions at Mormugao Harbour, helping to secure significant rights and benefits for the workforce. He served as the Chairman of the Goa Dock Labour Union and worked with the Mormugao Port Trust as a trustee. Additionally, he was the Convenor of the Indian National Trade Union Congress in Goa and the President of the Goa Taximen's Union and the Navjeevan Society.

In the initial session of the Second Goa Assembly, Dayanand Bandodkar, who served as the Chief Minister of Goa at the time, made the decision to remove Dattatraya Deshpande, along with Raghunath Tople, Ganaba Dessai and A Kadkade, from their positions in the organizational wing of the Maharashtrawadi Gomantak Party. This action took place on the first day of the assembly's session and marked their expulsion from the party.

== Death ==
He died on 22 September 1970.
