= Twelfth Amendment of the Constitution of India =

Law incorporating Goa, Daman and Diu into India

The Constitution (Twelfth Amendment) Act, 1962

Parliament of India
- Long title: An Act further to amend the Constitution of India.
- Citation: 12th Amendment
- Territorial extent: India
- Passed by: Lok Sabha
- Passed: 14 March 1962
- Passed by: Rajya Sabha
- Passed: 20 March 1962
- Assented to: 27 March 1962
- Commenced: 20 December 1961

Legislative history

First chamber: Lok Sabha
- Bill title: Constitution (Twelfth Amendment) Bill, 1962
- Introduced by: Jawaharlal Nehru
- Introduced: 12 March 1962

Summary
- Incorporated Goa, Daman and Diu as the eighth Union territory of India
- Status: Amended

The Twelfth Amendment of the Constitution of India, officially known as The Constitution (Twelfth Amendment) Act, 1962, incorporated Goa, Daman and Diu as the eighth Union territory of India, by amending the First Schedule to the Constitution. India acquired control of Goa, Daman and Diu from Portugal in December 1961. The amendment also amended clause (1) of article 240 of the Constitution to include therein these territories in order to enable the President to "make regulations for the peace, progress and good government of the territory".

The 12th Amendment retroactively came into effect on 20 December 1961, the day following the formal ceremony of official Portuguese surrender, when Governor General Manuel António Vassalo e Silva signed the instrument of surrender bringing to an end 451 years of Portuguese rule in Goa. On 30 May 1987, the union territory was split, and Goa was made India's twenty-fifth state, with Daman and Diu remaining a union territory.

== Text ==
BE it enacted by Parliament in the Thirteenth Year of the Republic of India as follows:—

1. Short title and commencement (1) This Act may be called the Constitution (Twelfth Amendment) Act, 1962.

(2) It shall be deemed to have come into force on the 20th day of December 1961

2. Amendment of the First Schedule In the First Schedule to the Constitution, under the heading "THE UNION TERRITORIES", after entry 7, the following entry shall be inserted, namely:—

"8. Goa, Daman and Diu. The territories which immediately before the twentieth day of December 1961 were comprised in Goa, Daman and Diu".

3. Amendment of article 240 In article 240 of the Constitution, in clause (1), after entry (c), the following entry shall be inserted, namely:—

"(d) Goa, Daman and Diu".

== Proposal and enactment ==
The Constitution (Twelfth Amendment) Bill, 1962 (Bill No. 3 of 1962) was introduced in the Lok Sabha on 12 March 1962. It was introduced by then Prime Minister Jawaharlal Nehru, and sought to amend article 240 and the First Schedule to the Constitution. The full text of the Statement of Objects and Reasons appended to the bill is given below: The full text of the Statement of Objects and Reasons appended to the bill is given below:

On the acquisition of the territories of Goa, Daman and Diu with effect from the 20th December, 1961, these territories have, by virtue of sub-clause (c) of clause (3) of article 1 of the Constitution, been comprised within the territory of India from that date and they are being administered as a Union territory by the President through an Administrator in accordance with article 239 of the Constitution. It is, however, considered desirable that Goa, Daman and Diu should be specifically included as a Union territory in the First Schedule to the Constitution. It is also considered that clause (1) of article 240 should be suitably amended to confer power on the President to make regulations for the peace, progress and good government of Goa, Daman and Diu, as has been done in the case of Dadra and Nagar Haveli.

The Constitution (Twelfth Amendment) Bill, 1962 seeks to make the above mentioned provisions.

— Jawaharlal Nehru, "The Constitution (Twelfth Amendment) Bill, 1962". This article incorporates text from this source, which is in the public domain.

The bill was debated and passed in the original form by the Lok Sabha on 14 March 1962. It was considered and passed by the Rajya Sabha on 20 March 1962. The bill received assent from then President Rajendra Prasad on 27 March 1962, and was notified in The Gazette of India on 28 March 1962. It retroactively came into force from 20 December 1961.

== See also ==
- 10th Amendment
- List of amendments of the Constitution of India
