= The Remembered Village =

1978 book by M. N. Srinivas

- Author: M. N. Srinivas
- Language: English
- Series: Oxford India Perennials
- Subject: Ethnography
- Publisher: Oxford, Oxford University Press
- Publication date: 1978
- Media type: Print
- Pages: 356
- ISBN: 0783746830

The Remembered Village is a 1978 ethnological work by M. N. Srinivas. The book is about the villager who lives in the small village, named as Rampura in the state of Karnataka, then called Mysore. It is notable for the absence of fieldnotes as a base for the work, which is considered standard in ethnography following the standards set by Bronislaw Malinowski in Argonauts of the Western Pacific as they were lost due to arson, and elicited fierce debate in the anthropological community due to its unorthodox origin, among other factors. The book is noted for its concern on the aesthetic, flowing prose and the significant role of the ethnographer himself, a marked departure from earlier works such as Evans-Pritchard's studies on the Nuer, which is written with a more objective voice.

== Background ==
The caste system in India has long been the subject of scholarly interest, but there was a distinct lack of ethnographic material on it as noted by Radcliffe-Brown. Inspired by this and other works such as that of Robert Redfield and Fei Hsiao-Tung, M.N. Srinivas set out to a remote part of India to carry out fieldwork as part of the position he was offered by his teacher, Evans-Pritchard and ended up choosing Rampura due to his fluency in Kannada and several emotional factors, including his ties to Mysore and being awed by the local view.

== Overview ==
The book consists of eleven chapters. General summaries of each chapter are included below.

- Chapter I: A description of the educational background of Srinivas and key theoretical influences, including Radcliffe-Brown, Evans-Pritchard and his decision to pick Rampura as the fieldwork site
- Chapter II: A brief overview of Rampura
- Chapter III: Three important men; The Headman, Kulle Gowda, and Nadu Gowda
- Chapter IV: Role of agriculture, and the general preoccupation of land by the villagers
- Chapter V: The role of sex in division of labour and sexual urges of the villagers
- Chapter VI: Inter-Caste relationships, purity and pollution plus discussions on Harijans and Muslims
- Chapter VII: Compounding of caste hierarchy by land possession, and the landowner-client relationship
- Chapter VIII: Changes of the village since 1948 to around 1952
- Chapter IX: Quality of social relations and reciprocity
- Chapter X: Role of religion, regarding pan-Indian deities in Hinduism and local deities
- Chapter XI: The author's recollections of his last few days in Rampura

== Theoretical concepts ==
=== Sanskritisation ===
The all-India varna and the local jati, based on land ownership, often are not strictly the same, with Brahmins and Lingayats higher in the caste order often being clients lower in the Varna order. The disparity in rank between the economic status and the ritual status could result in high jati classes moving up the varna hierarchy by adopting practices of higher castes.

=== Dominant caste ===
The concept of dominant caste in the book, where the peasant caste has much practical power, including influential members such as the headman, his lineage and the God's house lineage, could be related to their large numbers viv-à-vis the smaller numbers of the Brahmins, and could be used to explain other social phenomena, such as prestige among English trade unions.

== Reception ==
David Francis Pocock criticized Srinivas for putting excessive sociological jargon for his supposed audience,"the educated layman" and yet not sufficient to justify it as scholarly work, and also noted on the question of subjectivity. Another common form of criticism relates to the shortcomings of structural-functionalism, the basis of the work as taught by Evans-Pritchard in the vein of Durkheim.
