= Mohan Ranade =

Indian independence activist (1930–2019)

- Portrait of Ranade
- Born: Manohar Apte; 25 December 1930; Sangli, Bombay Presidency, British India
- Died: 25 June 2019 (aged 88); Pune, Maharashtra, India
- Organisation: Azad Gomantak Dal
- Known for: Murder of Custodio Fernandes
- Notable work: Struggle Unfinished; Satiche Vaan
- Movement: Goan independence movement
- Awards: Goa Puraskar (1986); Padma Shri (2001); Sangli Bhushan (2006)

Mohan Ranade (born Manohar Apte; 25 December 1930 – 25 June 2019) was an Indian independence activist. He participated in the Goan independence movement, and spent fourteen years in Caxias prison for the premeditated murder of a Goan policeman named Custodio Fernandes.

== Early life ==
Ranade was born as Manohar Apte, on 25 December 1930 to a Marathi Brahmin family in Sangli in Maharashtra, India. He adopted the pseudonym, Mohan Ranade when he joined the Goan independence movement.

== Role in Goan independence movement (1953–1969) ==
Encouraged by R K Barve of Bombay Presidency (now Maharashtra), Apte entered Goa illegally in 1949 and found a job as a private teacher of the Marathi language for Hindu students in Pernem but he soon returned to Bombay after an arrest warrant for illegally entering Goa was issued against him. He entered Goa illegally again in 1950 under the false name of Mohan Ranade, with the assistance of Vishnupant Vaze, and again began working as a Marathi language teacher for a small private group of Hindu students in Savoi Verem. He used to encourage his students to act in retaliation against the Portuguese, but was again arrested and deported for entering Goa illegally.

Ranade joined the militant organization, Azad Gomantak Dal in 1953. As a member of the organization, he was involved in the annexation of Silvassa in 1954 and then entered Goa illegally again.

Ranade also participated in a number of armed robberies on police and customs outposts, as well as mines, in order to steal weapons and explosives for his organization. On 18 August 1955, Ranade, infuriated by the action of a policeman Custodio Fernandes of Savoi Verem, for pulling down the Indian Tricolor and stamping on it, went at night to his house, called out to him and then shot him dead.

=== Arrest and incarceration ===
On 22 October 1955, Ranade attempted an armed robbery on the Betim Police Station, with an intention to loot the weapons. But Ranade was shot and wounded in his stomach by the police. He was arrested, charged with various offences (armed robbery, premeditated murder, etc.), tried in Portugal and sentenced to 26 years of imprisonment.

He was incarcerated at the Caxias prison near Lisbon where he was kept in solitary confinement for the first six years. He was released in January 1969, more than seven years after the Indian annexation of Goa in December 1961, and having served almost fourteen years in prison. The intervention of C. N. Annadurai (then Chief Minister of Madras State) through Pope Paul VI was instrumental in securing his release.

== Honours ==
Ranade was honoured with Padma Shri in 2001 and with the Sangli Bhushan in 2006. He was also awarded the Goa Puraskar in 1986 for his social work.

== Later life and death ==
Ranade authored two books on the Goan independence movement: Struggle Unfinished and Satiche Vaan. He ran a charitable organisation in Pune that sponsors education of students from economically backward backgrounds. He was chairman of the Goa Red Cross for over five years. He spent his later years in the city of Pune where he died on June 25, 2019.
