= Free Dadra and Nagar Haveli =

Former de facto independent political entity in South Asia

Free Dadra and Nagar Haveli Mukt dādrā āṇi nagar havēlī
- 1954–1961
- Status: De facto state claimed by Portugal
- Capital: Silvassa; 20.27°N 73.02°E
- Common languages: Gujarati, Hindi, Dhodia
- Government: Provisional government
- Administrator
  - 1954: R. V. Mudras
  - 1954: Vishwanath Lawande
  - 1954-1955: Appasaheb Karmalkar
  - 1955-1960: Antonio Furtado
  - 1960-1961: K. G. Badlani
- Prime Minister
  - 1961: K. G. Badlani
- Legislature: Varishta Panchayat
- Historical era: Cold War
  - Liberation of Dadra: 22 July 1954
  - Liberation of Nagar Haveli: 2 August 1954
  - Annexed by India: 11 August 1961
- Currency: Portuguese Indian rupia, later Indian rupee
Preceded by	Succeeded by
Portuguese India	Dadra and Nagar Haveli

Free Dadra and Nagar Haveli was a de facto independent political entity that existed on the Indian subcontinent between 1954 and 1961. It was declared by pro-India forces that had gained control of the region from Portugal in 1954, and ceased to exist after being formally annexed by India on 11 August 1961 as the Union Territory of Dadra and Nagar Haveli.

== History ==
Dadra and Nagar Haveli were small Portuguese overseas territories that had been part of Portuguese India since 1779. They were administered by a Portuguese Governor based in nearby Daman. Following Indian independence in 1947, they were completely surrounded by sovereign territory belonging to India.

On 22 July 1954, pro-India forces took control of the main police station in Dadra. They would proceed to take control of Naroli on 22 July and the capital of Silvassa on 2 August, at which point the region was declared liberated from Portuguese rule and assumed the name “Free Dadra and Nagar Haveli”. A body called the Varishta Panchayat of Free Dadra and Nagar Haveli was formed to administer the territory. The Indian National Flag was hoisted in Silvassa and the Indian national anthem was sung, becoming the symbols of the state.

In June 1961, the Varishta Panchayat of Free Dadra and Nagar Haveli voted to accede to India. An Indian civil servant, Kishinchand Gobindram Badlani, who had been serving as administrator since 1960, would assume the title “Prime Minister of Free Dadra and Nagar Haveli” on 11 August 1961 in order to formally sign an Instrument of Accession allowing annexation by India to take place. Free Dadra and Nagar Haveli was annexed by India on 11 August 1961 by virtue of the Tenth Amendment of the Constitution of India, becoming the Union Territory of Dadra and Nagar Haveli.

Portugal refused to recognise the loss of Dadra and Nagar Haveli, and continued to claim the areas as part of Portuguese India and were still recognised internationally (e.g., by the International Court of Justice) as Portuguese possessions. Portugal formally recognised Indian sovereignty over the area on 31 December 1974 following the Carnation Revolution.

== Government and politics ==
After Dadra and Nagar Haveli was declared liberated from Portuguese rule, a body called the Varishta Panchayat of Free Dadra and Nagar Haveli was formed to administer the region. The administration of Free Dadra and Nagar Haveli was also supported by civil servants from the Indian Administrative Service.

=== Office holders ===
Administrator

Name	Took office	Left office
R. V. Mudras	22 July 1954	24 July 1954
Jayantibhai Desai	22 July 1954	1 August 1954
Vishwanath Lawande	2 August 1954	15 August 1954
Atmaram Narsinh Karmalkar	15 August 1954	May 1955
Antoni Furtado	May 1955	17 October 1960
Kishinchand Gobindram Badlani	17 October 1960	11 August 1961

Prime Minister

Name	Took office	Left office
Kishinchand Gobindram Badlani	11 August 1961	11 August 1961

== Postal history ==
Mail from Free Dadra and Nagar Haveli was routed through the Indian town of Vapi close to the border. Initially, remaining stocks of stamps of Portuguese India were overprinted LIBERATED AREAS in two lines. A single revenue stamp was also issued by Free Dadra and Nagar Haveli.
