= Raghunath Tople =

Indian politician (born 1928)

Member of Goa, Daman and Diu Legislative Assembly
- In office 1963–1967
- Preceded by: Office established
- Succeeded by: Gopal Mayekar
- Constituency: Mapusa
- Majority: 4,511 (52%)

Personal details
- Born: Rogunata Ananta Tople; 2 August 1928 Reis Magos, Goa, Portuguese India, Portuguese Empire (now in India)
- Party: Janata Party (1979)
- Other political affiliations: Maharashtrawadi Gomantak Party (1963–1967)
- Occupation: Politician; teacher; playwright
- Nickname: R.A. Tople

Raghunath Anant Tople (Note: also spelt as Raghunath Ananta Tople.) (born Rogunata Ananta Tople; born 2 August 1928), also known as R.A. Tople, was an Indian politician, teacher, and playwright. He was a former member of the Goa, Daman and Diu Legislative Assembly representing the Mapusa Assembly constituency from 1963 to 1967. Tople was a member of the Janata Party.

Tople was among the many Goan playwrights who made significant contributions to the realm of drama and one-act plays. Many of his works were brought to life on stage by esteemed educational and cultural organizations. Tople, alongside Shantaram Dhond, played prominent roles as key figures within the Maharashtrawadi Aghadi centre located in Mapusa, Goa.

== Early and personal life ==
Tople was born on 2 August 1928 to Marathi immigrants Ananta Tople and Pritabai Tople in Reis Magos, Goa, Portuguese India during the Portuguese Empire (now in India) as Rogunata Ananta Tople. He belonged to the Vaishya Hindu community. Tople completed his Bachelor of Arts in Economics and Psychology. He later completed his Bachelor of Education.

== Career ==
Tople first contested in the 1963 Goa, Daman and Diu Legislative Assembly election on the Maharashtrawadi Gomantak Party ticket and emerged victorious with a majority of 4,511 votes.

In the initial session of the Second Goa Assembly, Dayanand Bandodkar, who served as the Chief Minister of Goa at the time, made the decision to remove Tople, along with Ganaba Dessai, A Kadkade, and Dattatraya Deshpande, from their positions in the organizational wing of the Maharashtrawadi Gomantak Party. This action took place on the first day of the assembly's session and marked their expulsion from the party.

Despite winning his first election, Tople didn't show interest in the subsequent three elections. His return to the elections came when he contested in the 1980 Goa, Daman and Diu Legislative Assembly election from the same constituency on the Janata Party ticket. However, he lost to the Indian National Congress (U) candidate, Jairam Nevagi, by a margin of 5,783 votes.
