= Azad Gomantak Dal =

Indian armed revolutionary organization

The Azad Gomantak Dal was an armed revolutionary organization set up with the goal of ending Portuguese rule in Goa. Unlike non-violent movements advocating for Goa’s independence, the AGD engaged in armed resistance to overthrow Portuguese rule. The AGD was inspired by the Azad Hind Fauj led by Subhash Chandra Bose.

== Formation ==
Following the suppression of peaceful protests against Portuguese rule, a faction of independence activists opted for an armed movement, leading to the establishment of the AGD. The AGD thus broke away from the peaceful National Congress Goa (NCG) in June 1947, at a meeting held at the Shantadurga temple in Cuncoliem. With loaded pistols, the Dal recited their oath:

With an invocation to God and salute to the weapon held in my hand, I do, hereby, take the oath and solemnly declare that I fully accept the primary objective of a speedy deliverance of Indian land from the Portuguese occupation. I am aware of the perils and obstacles in the path towards Goa's freedom, and I shall extend myself to the utmost, unwaveringly, to achieve our ultimate aim.

== Ideology ==
The AGD believed that armed resistance was necessary to overthrow Portuguese rule, after observing the poor treatment of other non-violent protestors advocating for Goa's independence. The group carried out guerrilla-style attacks against Portuguese military and administrative targets. This was done to undermine Portuguese authority in Goa.

== Organization and training ==
The AGD established a structured training system to prepare its volunteers. By August 1956, the organization had approximately 240 trained fighters stationed across Goa and Daman.

=== Training camps ===
Training camps were conducted under the supervision of experienced military officers, including Captain D.G. Gole from Poona and Colonel Sher Jang Chaudhary from Delhi. The primary organizers were Prabhakar Vitthal Sinari (assigned to the North) and Prabhakar Trivikram Vaidya (assigned to the South). Specialized training in weaponry and explosives was provided in the forests of Sattari (Morle and Krishnapur) and Sanguem (Dudhsagar and Mollem), as well as in the regions of Ambali, Vajre, Kudal, and Parghat.

=== Ideological education ===
Volunteers were also provided with ideological instruction on subjects such as the history of the Indian and Goan independence movement and socialism. These lectures were delivered by Shyamrao Lad, Jhotiko P.D. Souza, and Mahabaleshwar Naik.

=== Communication network ===
To maintain coordination between units, the organization established communication centers in various locations, including Aronde, Satarda, Banda, Terekhol, Kankumbi, and Castlerock. These centers were managed by a network of activists including Tony Fernandes, Krishnarao Rane, and several others.

== Key activities ==
AGD members carried out several attacks against Portuguese installations. Among their significant operations was an attempt in July 1947 to seize the Fazenda (Portuguese treasury) in Mapuça. The organization also actively participated in the 1954 Indian annexation of Dadra and Nagar Haveli, contributing to the takeover of the enclave from Portuguese government.

On 31 July 1954, volunteers of the AGD, accompanied by some volunteers of Jana Sangh, made their way into Nagar Haveli and captured Nairoli. On 2 August, AGD volunteers captured Silvassa and 155 Portuguese soldiers, and hoisted the Indian flag there. On 11 August, AGD volunteers captured Khandel, ending the independence of Dadra and Nagar Haveli.

On 18 February 1955, Bala Raya Mapari from Assonora was tortured to death while imprisoned at the Mapusa police station. A member of the AGD, he is considered as the first martyr of the later phase of the independence movement.

During the Goan independence movement, AGD fighters engaged in skirmishes with Portuguese forces and facilitated Indian intelligence efforts in the region. Despite their contributions, the AGD's role was downplayed in official accounts following the Indian annexation of Goa.

=== Raids and sabotage ===
Between January and May 1955, the AGD executed several raids on police stations and military outposts to seize weapons and ammunition. Notable operations included:

Date	Location	Leaders
1 January 1955	Banastarim Police Chowki	Mohan Ranade
9 February 1955	Guleli Police Chowki	Krishna Mayenkar and Krishnarao Rane
11 February 1955	Assonora	Kanoba Naik
12 February 1955	Canacona	Dattaram Desai and Prabhakar Vaidya
19 February 1955	Ravna Military Chowki	Prabhakar Sinari
12 March 1955	Calangute Police Chowki	Yashwant Agvadekar
1 April 1955	Cuncolim Police Chowki	Prabhakar Vaidya and Dattaram Desai
17 May 1955	Kalem and Halarn Police Chowki	Rajnikant Kenkre, Ramdas Chanfadkar, and Shambhu Palekar

== Offshoot ==
Prabhakar Sinari later founded an offshoot of the AGD called the Rancour Patriótica.

== Notable members ==
- Prabhakar Sinari – Often referred to as the "Che Guevara of Goa," Sinari was a leading commander within the AGD. He coordinated attacks on Portuguese military targets and later sought recognition for the group's contributions.
- Vishwanath Lawande – A founding member of the AGD, Lawande was active in armed operations against Portuguese forces and took part in efforts to disrupt colonial administration.
- Mohan Ranade – Ranade participated in multiple raids on Portuguese posts, leading to his imprisonment by the Portuguese authorities.
- Dattatray Deshpande
- Leo Velho Mauricio
