= Tenth Amendment of the Constitution of India =

Incorporation of Dadra and Nagar Haveli

The Constitution (Tenth Amendment) Act, 1961

Parliament of India
- Long title: An Act further to amend the Constitution of India.
- Citation: 10th Amendment
- Territorial extent: India
- Passed by: Lok Sabha
- Passed: 14 August 1961
- Passed by: Rajya Sabha
- Passed: 16 August 1961
- Assented to: 16 August 1961
- Commenced: 11 August 1961

Legislative history

First chamber: Lok Sabha
- Bill title: Constitution (Tenth Amendment) Bill, 1961
- Introduced by: Laxmi Menon
- Introduced: 11 August 1961

Summary
- Incorporated Dadra and Nagar Haveli as the seventh Union territory of India
- Status: In force

The Tenth Amendment of the Constitution of India, officially known as The Constitution (Tenth Amendment) Act, 1961, incorporated Dadra and Nagar Haveli as the seventh Union territory of India, by amending the First Schedule to the Constitution. It also amended clause (1) of article 240 of the Constitution to include therein the Union territory of Dadra and Nagar Haveli in order to enable the President to "make regulations for the peace, progress and good government of the territory". The 10th Amendment retroactively came into effect on 11 August 1961.

Indian forces took control of Goa, Daman and Diu in 1961, and KG Badlani, an officer of the Indian Administrative Service (IAS) was designated Prime Minister of Free Dadra and Nagar Haveli for one day, so that, as head of state, he could sign an agreement with Prime Minister Jawaharlal Nehru to merge Dadra and Nagar Haveli formally with the Republic of India. On 31 December 1974, a treaty was signed between India and Portugal recognising India's sovereignty over Goa, Daman, Diu, Dadra and Nagar Haveli.

== Text ==
BE it enacted by Parliament in the Thirteenth Year of the Republic of India as follows:—

1. Short title and commencement 1. (1) This Act may be called the Constitution (Tenth Amendment) Act, 1961.

(2) It shall be deemed to have come into force on the 11th day of August, 1961.

2. Amendment of the First Schedule In the First Schedule to the Constitution, under the heading "THE UNION TERRITORIES", after entry 6, the following entry shall be inserted, namely:—

"7. Dadra and Nagar Haveli. The territory which immediately before the eleventh day of August 1961 was comprised in Free Dadra and Nagar Haveli".

3. Amendment of article 240 In article 240 of the Constitution, in clause (1), after entry (b), the following entry shall be inserted, namely:—

"(c) Dadra and Nagar Haveli".

== Background ==
The Portuguese occupied Nagar Haveli on 10 June 1783 on the basis of Friendship Treaty executed on 17 December 1779 as compensation towards damage to the Portuguese frigate by the Maratha Navy. In 1785, the Portuguese purchased Dadra. It was administered by the Portuguese Governor of Daman until 1954.

After India attained independence in 1947, the residents of Dadra and Nagar Haveli, with the help of volunteers of organisations like the United Front of Goans (UFG), the Rashtriya Swayamsevak Sangh (RSS), the National Movement Liberation Organisation (NMLO), and the Azad Gomantak Dal, dislodged Portuguese rule in the territories in 1954. Although it enjoyed de facto independence, Dadra and Nagar Haveli were still recognised internationally (e.g., by the International Court of Justice) as Portuguese possessions. The residents of the former colony requested the Government of India for administrative help. KG Badlani, an officer of the Indian Administrative Service was sent as the administrator. From 1954 to 1961, the territory was administered by a body called the Varishta Panchayat of Free Dadra and Nagar Haveli.

In 1961, when Indian forces took over Goa, Daman and Diu, Badlani was designated Prime Minister of Dadra and Nagar Haveli for one day, so that, as head of state, he could sign an agreement with Prime Minister Jawaharlal Nehru to merge Dadra and Nagar Haveli formally with the Republic of India.

== Proposal and enactment ==
The Constitution (Tenth Amendment) Bill, 1961 (Bill No. 43 of 1961) was introduced in the Lok Sabha on 11 August 1961. It was introduced by Laxmi Menon, then Deputy Minister of External Affairs, and sought to amend article 240 and the First Schedule to the Constitution. The full text of the Statement of Objects and Reasons appended to the bill is given below: The full text of the Statement of Objects and Reasons appended to the bill is given below:

The people and the Varishta Panchayat of Free Dadra and Nagar Haveli have repeatedly affirmed their request to the Government of India for integration of their territories with the Union of India to which they rightly belong. Their request was recently embodied in a formal Resolution adopted by the Varishta Panchayat on the 12th June, 1961.

In deference to the desire and request of the people of Free Dadra and Nagar Haveli for integration of their territories with the Union of India, the Government of India have decided that these territories should form part of the Union of India.

It is proposed to specify these areas expressly as the Union territory of Dadra and Nagar Haveli by amending the First Schedule to the Constitution. It is further proposed to amend clause (1) of article 240 of the Constitution to include therein the Union territory of Dadra and Nagar Haveli in order to enable the President to make regulations for the peace, progress and good government of the territory. The Bill seeks to give effect to these proposals.

— Jawaharlal Nehru, "The Constitution (Tenth Amendment) Bill, 1961".

The bill was debated and passed in the original form by the Lok Sabha on 14 August 1961. It was considered and passed by the Rajya Sabha on 16 August 1961. The bill received assent from then President Rajendra Prasad on 16 August 1961, and was notified in The Gazette of India on 17 August 1961. It retroactively came into force from 11 August 1961.

== See also ==
- 12th Amendment
- Goa liberation movement
- Panchayati raj
- List of amendments of the Constitution of India
