= Postage stamps and postal history of Portuguese India =

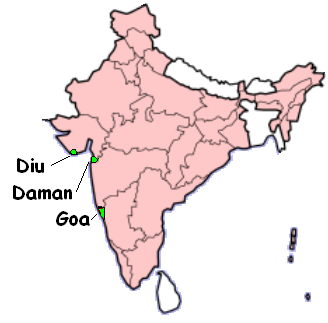
Portuguese India in 1961

The postal history of Portuguese India goes back to the earlier days of the colony. The postal history begins with communication between the Viceroy and the Court at Lisbon soon after the conquest of Old Goa by Afonso de Albuquerque in 1510. Letters, written in triplicate, were carried by separate ships because of the hazards of the voyage. Mail was carried by an overland route, as well. The early communications of Portuguese India had an official character and the correspondence is now to be found in museums and governmental and ecclesiastical archives.

== Early mails ==
A stamp of the British East India Company, cancelled with the Damaun postmark in Portuguese India

Regular mail is known to have been exchanged with Lisbon from 1825 on. Portuguese Indian postmarks are known from 1854, when a post office opened in Goa and an extraterritorial British East India Company post office opened in Damaun. A Portuguese Indian post office opened at Diu, also, in 1880.

The British East India Company post office in Damaun, selling British Indian stamps, was maintained between 1854 and November 1883. The Damaun cancellation showed "13" within downward sloping diagonal bars, a "used abroad" Renouf "Type 4" cancellation. British India postage stamps were also available at the Portuguese post office at Goa from 1854 until 1877.

Before the Universal Postal Union was established in 1874, a country had to conclude a separate postal treaty with each other country with which it transacted international mail. Portugal had a postal convention with Great Britain, so mail was routed through Bombay and carried on British packets.

== First stamps ==
The first postage stamps of Portuguese India were issued 1 October 1871. These were issued for local use within the colony. Stamps of British India were required for overseas mail.

The design of these first stamps simply consisted of a denomination in the center, with an oval band containing the inscriptions "SERVIÇO POSTAL" and "INDIA PORT.". The dies were recut several times and printed on several kinds of paper, resulting in an extremely complicated situation that has been intensively studied; about 55 types have been identified as appearing between 1871 and 1877, some of which are quite rare.

== Regular issues ==
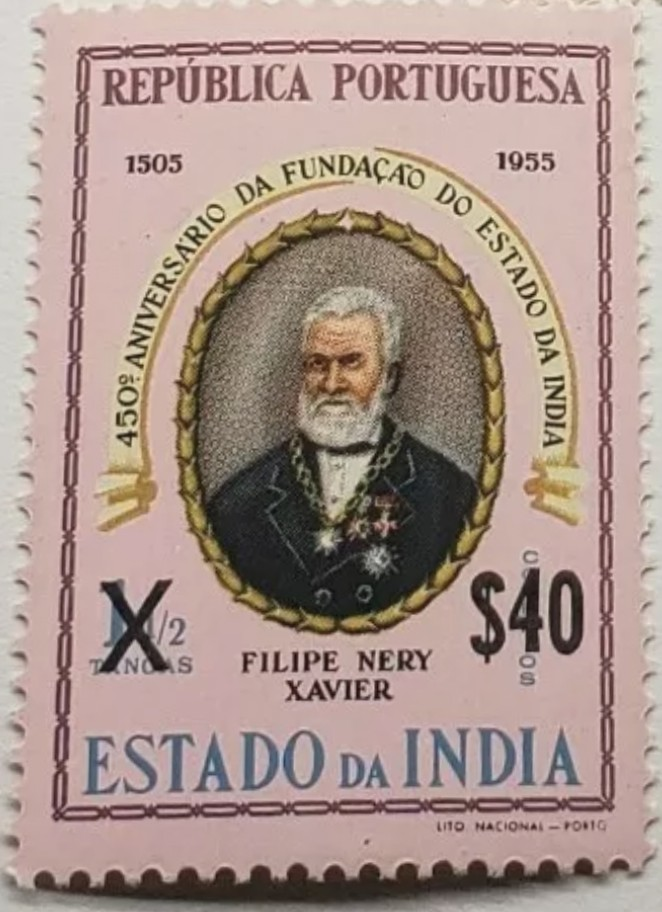
A 1956 stamp commemorating the 450th anniversary of Portuguese India with a portrait of Filipe Nery Xavier

In 1877, Portugal included India in its standard "crown" issue, with nine values ranging from 5 r to 300 r. These stamps ran out in 1881 and the old local stamps were surcharged with various values, resulting in nearly 100 distinct types. Additional "crown" stamps arrived in 1882, but in the following year were supplemented by additional values of the original local design.

From 1886 on, the pattern of regular stamp issues followed that of the other colonies closely, the main exception being a series of surcharges in 1912 produced by perforating existing stamps vertically through the middle and overprinting a new value on each side.

In 1925, a commemorative stamp marked the 400th anniversary of the death of Vasco da Gama and in December 1931 a set of six promoted the Exposition of St. Francis Xavier held at Goa. Sets of stamps in 1946 and 1948 commemorated notable historical figures related to the colony. Portuguese India's first stamp exhibition, in 1952, was commemorated with a pair of stamps; one reproducing the design of the first issue, the other depicting St. Francis Xavier. A 1956 series commemorated the 450th anniversary of Portuguese settlements in India, and included portraits and maps of old forts, while a 1959 series depicted various coins.

== Last stamps ==
The last regular issue was on 25 June 1960, marking the 500th anniversary of the death of Prince Henry the Navigator. Stamps of India were first used 29 December 1961, although the old stamps were accepted until 5 January 1962. Portugal continued to issue stamps for the lost colony, yet none of these were ever offered for sale in the colony's post offices and are thus not considered valid stamps.

The territories of Dadra and Nagar Haveli were annexed from Portuguese rule in 1954, and they enjoyed de facto independence until being formally incorporated into India after the Annexation of Goa in 1961. During these years, mail from Dadra and Nagar Haveli was routed through the Indian town of Vapi close to the border. Initially, remaining stocks of stamps of Portuguese India were overprinted LIBERATED AREAS in two lines.

== See also ==
- Portuguese India
- Postage stamps and postal history of India

== References and sources ==
Sources

- Harrison, Gilbert & Lieut. F. H. Napier, R.N. Portuguese India. London: Stanley Gibbons, 1893. (Reprinted from articles in Stanley Gibbons' Monthly Journal.)
