= Shirgaon, Solapur =

Village in Maharashtra

Shirgaon
- Village
- Interactive map of Shirgaon
- Country: India
- State: Maharashtra
- District: Solapur

Languages
  - Official: Marathi
- Time zone: UTC+5:30 (IST)
- Postal code: 413304
- Vehicle registration: MH-13
- Coastline: 0 kilometres (0 mi)

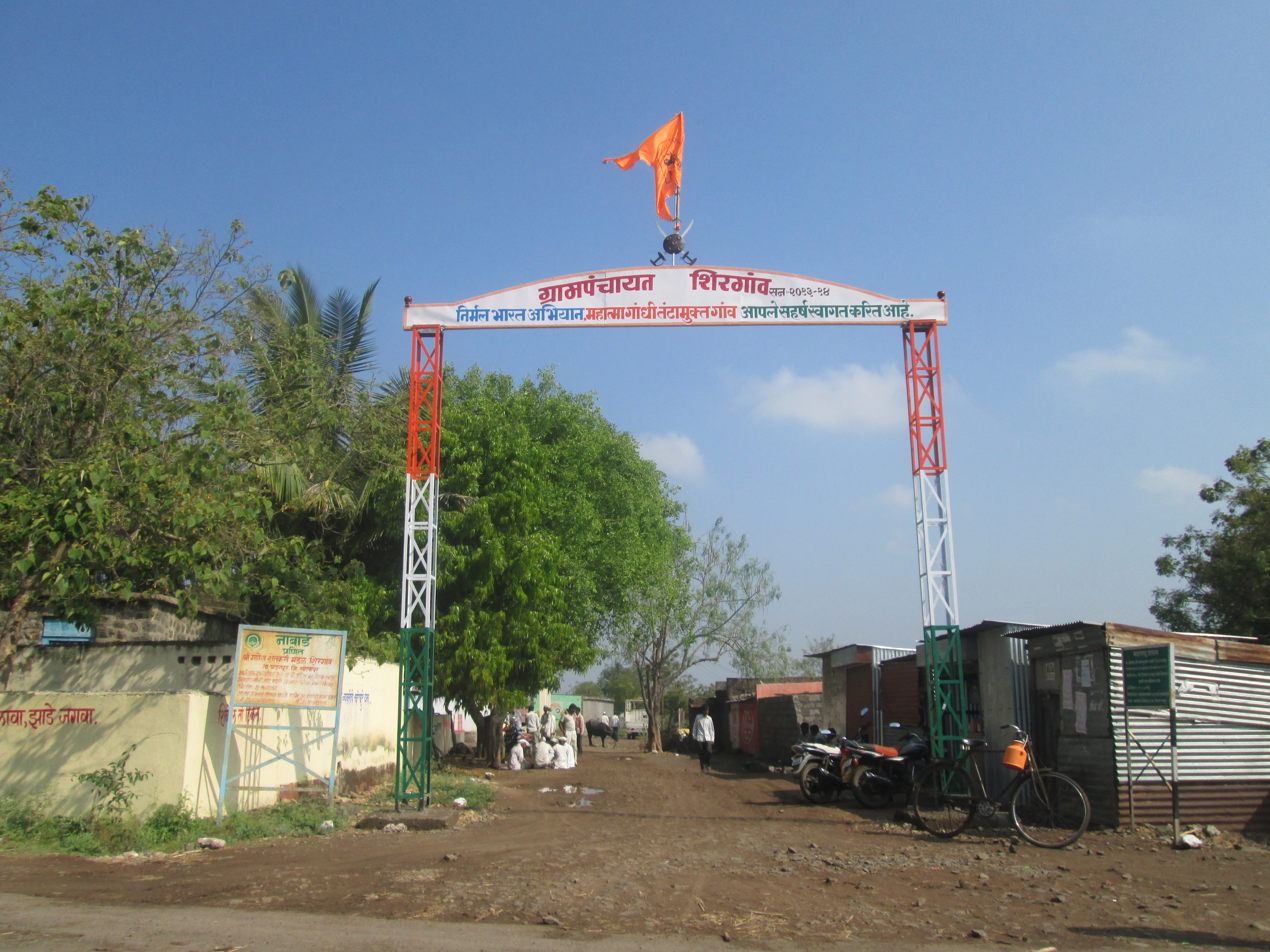

Shirgaon is a village in located in a Pandharpur tehsil, Solapur district, Maharashtra, India. It is 11 km (7 mi) from the holy place well known for Pandurang or Vitthal, Pandharpur.

Long before the shirgaon was located near to Maan river. But in search of better place it moved away from river inside 3 km (2 mi) away from highway.

It has the more land area than other villages in panchkroshi (group of villages).

Shirgaon has rich cultural history. It is having blessings of lord Mahadev (Shankar/Shiva) and Hanuman. Lord Mahadeva's temple build in a Hemadpanthi style.

Bhandara (भंडारा) of Lord Mahadev is the main event celebrated in Shirgaon. On that auspicious day devotees from nearby places take blessings of Lord Mahadev. The programmes of Bhajan, Kirtan arranged on this occasion.

Another big event is Vetalbaba's Jatra. The main attraction of this event is the programmes such as Tamasha (Lavni programme) or drama when people from surrounding villages gather to see in nights.

Also people celebrate the goddesses Lakshmi and Mariaai yatras.

The Ganesh festival, Jotibachi Palkhi, Goddess Tulja Bhawani festival are also celebrated with same enthusiasm.

Geography of Shirgaon is divided in to the 6 areas called Main gaon, Varcha Mala Or (Ghadage Guruji Vasti), Patil Mala, Pimpalacha Mala, Wadekar Mala and Ranaware Vasti. Majority of the population in the Shirgaon belongs to the Ghadage and Wadekar.

The sugarcane, jowar, grapes, maize are the important crops taken by farmers. The new ideas always implemented in farming to increase the production.
