= Navelim Assembly constituency =

Legislative Assembly constituency in Goa State, India

Coordinates: 15.26°N 73.97°E

Navelim
- Constituency No. 33 for the Goa Legislative Assembly

Constituency details
- Country: India
- Region: Western India
- State: Goa
- District: South Goa
- Lok Sabha constituency: South Goa
- Established: 1963
- Total electors: 28,892
- Reservation: None

Member of Legislative Assembly
- 8th Goa Legislative Assembly
- Incumbent Ulhas Tuenkar
- Party: Bharatiya Janata Party

Navelim Assembly constituency is one of the 40 Goa Legislative Assembly constituencies of the state of Goa in southern India. Navelim is also one of the 20 constituencies falling under South Goa Lok Sabha constituency.

== Members of the Legislative Assembly ==
Year	Member	Party
1963	Alvaro de Loyola Furtado	United Goans Party
1967	Leo Velho Mauricio	United Goans Party
1972	Leo Velho Mauricio	United Goans Party
1977	Leo Velho Mauricio	Indian National Congress
1980	Luizinho Faleiro	Indian National Congress (Urs)
1984	Luizinho Faleiro	Independent
1989	Luizinho Faleiro	Indian National Congress
1994	Luizinho Faleiro	Indian National Congress
1999	Luizinho Faleiro	Indian National Congress
2002	Luizinho Faleiro	Indian National Congress
2007	Churchill Alemao	Save Goa Front
2012	Avertano Furtado	Independent
2017	Luizinho Faleiro	Indian National Congress
2022	Ulhas Tuenkar	Bharatiya Janata Party

== Election results ==
=== 2027 Assembly election ===
2027 Goa Legislative Assembly election: Navelim
Party	Candidate	Votes	%	±%
INC				
NDA				
NOTA	None of the above			
Majority				
Turnout				
gain from		Swing		

=== Assembly Election 2022 ===
2022 Goa Legislative Assembly election : Navelim
Party	Candidate	Votes	%	±%
BJP	Ulhas Tuenkar	5,168	24.42	New
AITC	Valanka Natasha Alemao	4,738	22.39	New
INC	Avertano Furtado	3,806	17.98	▼20.34
NCP	Mohammad Rehan Mujawar	2,622	12.39	New
AAP	Pratima Betsy Coutinho	2,327	11.00	▲4.97
RGP	Bento Da Silva	2,086	9.86	New
NOTA	None of the Above	168	0.79	▼0.37
Margin of victory		430	2.03	▼9.57
Turnout		21,164	74.16	▼4.82
Registered electors		28,892		▲5.64
BJP gain from INC		Swing	▼13.91	

=== Assembly Election 2017 ===
2017 Goa Legislative Assembly election : Navelim
Party	Candidate	Votes	%	±%
INC	Luizinho Faleiro	8,183	38.33	▼4.73
Independent	Avertano Furtado	5,705	26.72	New
Independent	Edwin Cardozo (Cipru)	3,027	14.18	New
MGP	Satyaviajay Naik	1,798	8.42	New
AAP	Siddharth Karapurkar	1,287	6.03	New
Goa Vikas Party	Cruz Antonio Jorge Barretto	839	3.93	New
Independent	Duarte Pires	263	1.23	New
NOTA	None of the Above	249	1.17	New
Margin of victory		2,478	11.61	▲0.18
Turnout		21,351	78.07	▼0.50
Registered electors		27,349		▲14.42
INC gain from Independent		Swing	▼16.15	

=== Assembly Election 2012 ===
2012 Goa Legislative Assembly election : Navelim
Party	Candidate	Votes	%	±%
Independent	Avertano Furtado	10,231	54.48	New
INC	Churchill Alemao	8,086	43.06	▲3.93
Independent	Iliyas Shaikh	261	1.39	New
JD(U)	Jose Paul Coutinho	202	1.08	New
Margin of victory		2,145	11.42	▼8.17
Turnout		18,780	78.58	▲12.77
Registered electors		23,903		▼31.60
Independent gain from Save Goa Front		Swing	▼4.24	

=== Assembly Election 2007 ===
2007 Goa Legislative Assembly election : Navelim
Party	Candidate	Votes	%	±%
Save Goa Front	Churchill Alemao	13,500	58.71	New
INC	Luizinho Faleiro	8,996	39.12	▼20.37
UGDP	J. P. Coutinho	497	2.16	New
Margin of victory		4,504	19.59	▼6.99
Turnout		22,993	65.87	▲7.09
Registered electors		34,947		▲19.13
Save Goa Front gain from INC		Swing		

=== Assembly Election 2002 ===
2002 Goa Legislative Assembly election : Navelim
Party	Candidate	Votes	%	±%
INC	Luizinho Faleiro	10,245	59.50	▼15.98
Independent	Raikar John Lourence	5,668	32.92	New
BJP	Shaikh Jina Nabi	525	3.05	▼11.31
Independent	Coutinho Josepaul J. V.	473	2.75	New
Independent	Donato D'Costa	197	1.14	New
Independent	Belarbino Dias Mandoly	111	0.64	New
Margin of victory		4,577	26.58	▼34.54
Turnout		17,219	58.71	▲2.40
Registered electors		29,334		▲3.41
INC hold		Swing	▼15.98	

=== Assembly Election 1999 ===
1999 Goa Legislative Assembly election : Navelim
Party	Candidate	Votes	%	±%
INC	Luizinho Faleiro	12,054	75.48	▲23.50
BJP	Sheikh Jina Nabi	2,293	14.36	New
UGDP	Xavier Filipe Coutinho	1,365	8.55	New
Independent	Joseph Lawrence Rui Vaz	163	1.02	New
Margin of victory		9,761	61.12	▲42.80
Turnout		15,970	56.32	▼11.19
Registered electors		28,368		▲21.68
INC hold		Swing	▲23.50	

=== Assembly Election 1994 ===
1994 Goa Legislative Assembly election : Navelim
Party	Candidate	Votes	%	±%
INC	Luizinho Faleiro	8,178	51.98	New
UGDP	Pinto Nazario Jose	5,296	33.66	New
BJP	Balu Jolapure	1,107	7.04	New
Independent	Coutinho Xavier Philip	528	3.36	New
Independent	Shaikh Gawas Ahamad Kashinsab	220	1.40	New
BSP	D'Costa Emidio Manuel	171	1.09	New
Margin of victory		2,882	18.32	
Turnout		15,733	68.62	▲67.48
Registered electors		23,314		▲8.82
INC hold		Swing		

=== Assembly Election 1989 ===
1989 Goa Legislative Assembly election : Navelim
Party	Candidate	Votes	%	±%
INC	Luizinho Faleiro	Uncontested		New
Registered electors		21,425		▲3.01
INC gain from Independent		Swing		

=== Assembly Election 1984 ===
1984 Goa, Daman and Diu Legislative Assembly election : Navelim
Party	Candidate	Votes	%	±%
Independent	Luizinho Faleiro	9,126	68.08	New
INC	Temudo Benedito Francis	3,472	25.90	New
BJP	Naik Vilas Anant	335	2.50	New
MGP	Xavier Gregorio Santana	296 #DIV/0!		New
Independent	Shirodkar Gokuldas Shanu	176 #DIV/0!		New
Margin of victory		5,654	42.18	▼9.69
Turnout		13,405	65.94	▲2.46
Registered electors		20,799		▲23.21
Independent gain from INC(U)		Swing	▼5.64	

=== Assembly Election 1980 ===
1980 Goa, Daman and Diu Legislative Assembly election : Navelim
Party	Candidate	Votes	%	±%
INC(U)	Luizinho Faleiro	7,715	73.72	New
MGP	Temudo Benelito Francisco	2,287	21.85	New
JP	Baig Fakir Adam	307	2.93	New
Independent	Loximon Vithal Prabhu Concar	156	1.49	New
Margin of victory		5,428	51.87	▲29.51
Turnout		10,465	63.37	▲3.23
Registered electors		16,881		▲10.41
INC(U) gain from INC		Swing	▲24.37	

=== Assembly Election 1977 ===
1977 Goa, Daman and Diu Legislative Assembly election : Navelim
Party	Candidate	Votes	%	±%
INC	Leo Velho Mauricio	4,434	49.35	New
MGP	Kadam Shantaram Bicaji	2,425	26.99	New
JP	Sarmalkar Jeetandra Vasudev	1,865	20.76	New
Independent	Robello John Baptist	209	2.33	New
Margin of victory		2,009	22.36	▼21.98
Turnout		8,985	59.28	▲1.69
Registered electors		15,290		▼20.08
INC gain from UGP		Swing	▼20.42	

=== Assembly Election 1972 ===
1972 Goa, Daman and Diu Legislative Assembly election : Navelim
Party	Candidate	Votes	%	±%
UGP	Leo Velho Mauricio	7,618	69.77	▲10.26
MGP	Miranda Elu Jose	2,777	25.43	New
CPI	Madkaikar S Narayan	344	3.15	New
ABJS	Knowlekar Prakash Bhikaji	180	1.65	New
Margin of victory		4,841	44.34	▲10.57
Turnout		10,919	57.86	▼5.03
Registered electors		19,132		▲8.00
UGP hold		Swing	▲10.26	

=== Assembly Election 1967 ===
1967 Goa, Daman and Diu Legislative Assembly election : Navelim
Party	Candidate	Votes	%	±%
UGP	Leo Velho Mauricio	6,546	59.50	New
MGP	D. P. Santano	2,831	25.73	New
United Goans Party (Furtado Group)	A. D. L. Furtado	1,264	11.49	New
Independent	E. Dias	221	2.01	New
Independent	P. R. V. J. Lourenco	107	0.97	New
Margin of victory		3,715	33.77	
Turnout		11,001	63.95	
Registered electors		17,715		
UGP win (new seat)				

== See also ==
- List of constituencies of the Goa Legislative Assembly
- South Goa district
