= Ulhas Tuenkar =

Indian politician

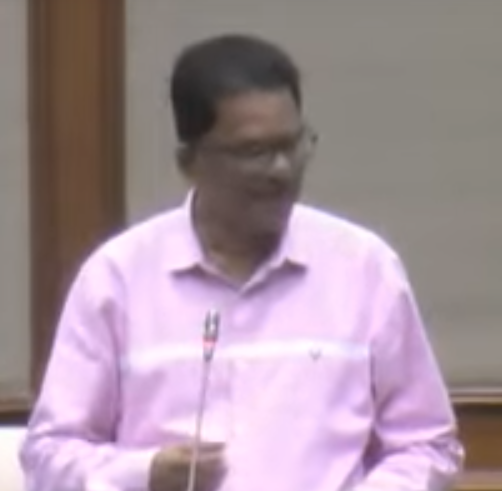
- Tuenkar in 2024

Member of the Goa Legislative Assembly
- Incumbent
- Assumed office 10 March 2022
- Preceded by: Luizinho Faleiro
- Constituency: Navelim

Personal details
- Born: Ulhas Yeshwant Tuenkar
- Party: Bharatiya Janata Party
- Education: Industrial Training Institute, Farmagudi, Goa (1982)
- Profession: Social worker

Ulhas Yeshwant Tuenkar is an Indian politician from Goa and a member of the Goa Legislative Assembly. Tuenkar won the Navelim Assembly constituency on the Bharatiya Janata Party ticket in the 2022 Goa Legislative Assembly election. Tuenkar defeated Valanka Alemao of Trinamool Congress by 430 votes.
