= Luizinho Faleiro =

Indian politician (born 1951)

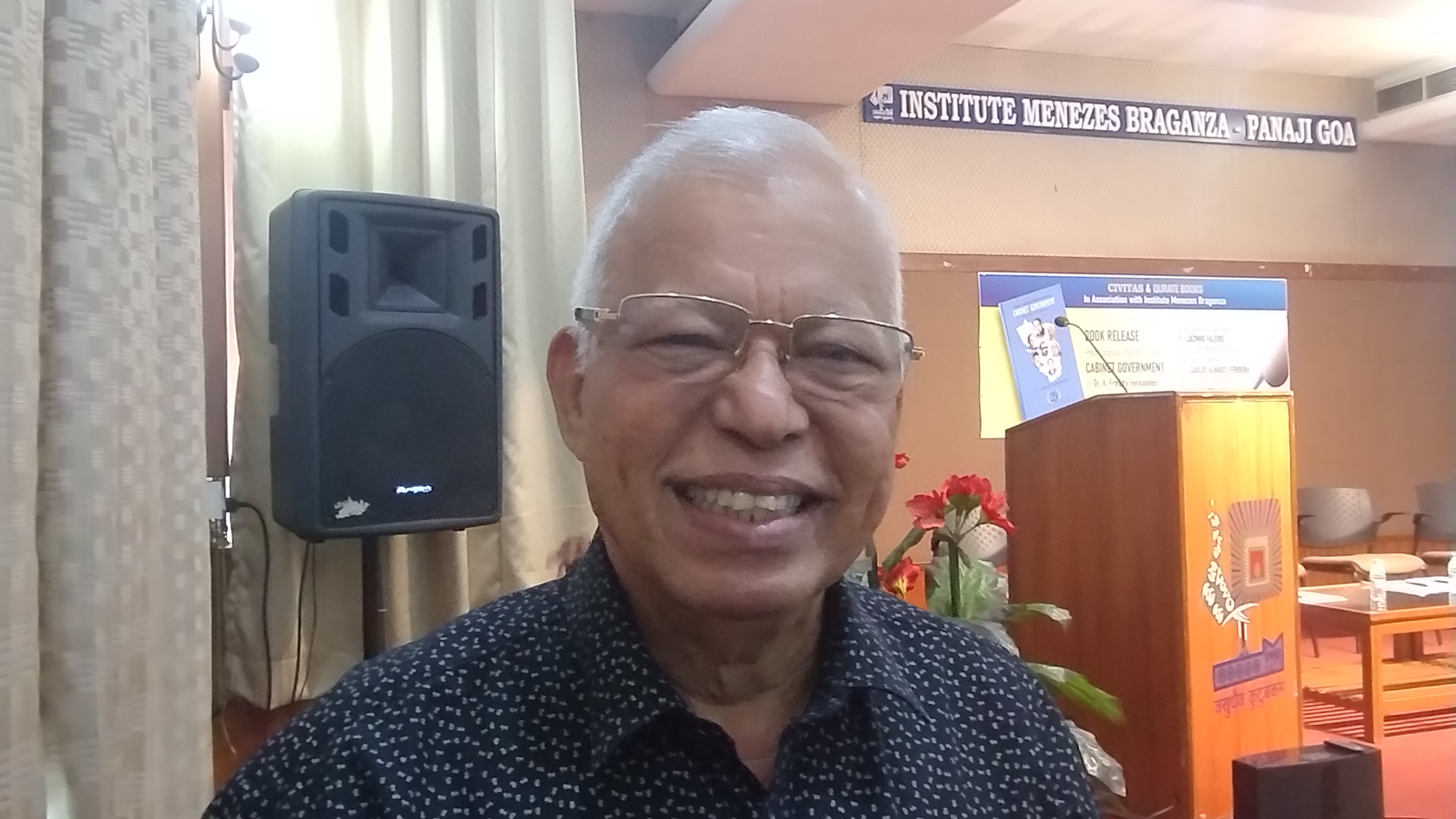
- Faleiro in 2025

Member of Parliament, Rajya Sabha
- In office 22 November 2021 – 11 April 2023
- Preceded by: Arpita Ghosh
- Succeeded by: Saket Gokhale
- Constituency: West Bengal

Vice President of Trinamool Congress
- In office 22 October 2021 – 11 April 2023
- President: Subrata Bakshi
- Preceded by: Yashwant Sinha

6th Chief Minister of Goa
- In office 9 June 1999 – 24 November 1999
- Preceded by: President's rule
- Succeeded by: Francisco Sardinha
- In office 26 November 1998 – 8 February 1999
- Preceded by: Wilfred de Souza
- Succeeded by: President's rule

Member of the Goa Legislative Assembly
- In office 2017–2022
- Preceded by: Avertano Furtado
- Succeeded by: Ulhas Tuenkar
- Constituency: Navelim
- In office 1980–2007
- Preceded by: Velho Leo Mauricic
- Succeeded by: Churchill Alemao
- Constituency: Navelim

President,Goa Pradesh Congress Committee
- In office 7 October 2014 – 8 July 2017
- Succeeded by: Shantaram Naik

Personal details
- Born: 26 August 1951 (age 74) Goa, Portuguese India
- Party: Trinamool Congress (2021–2023)
- Other political affiliations: Indian National Congress (1979–2021)
- Spouse: Rachel Faleiro
- Children: 3
- Website: Official website

Luizinho Faleiro (born 26 August 1951) is an Indian politician who served as the sixth Chief Minister of Goa from 1998 to 1999. He is a former Trinamool Congress member who served as a Vice President in the All India Congress Committee of Indian National Congress and was In-charge of the seven North Eastern States. Faleiro was credited with devising strategies and forming alliances that led to formation of Governments in Mizoram, Meghalaya, Arunachal Pradesh and Manipur.

In 2013, Faleiro was appointed as the Chairman of the Karnataka Pradesh Assembly Elections Screening Committee, following which the Congress won the Karnataka Assembly Elections. He quit the Indian National Congress on 27 September 2021 to join the Trinamool Congress on 29 September 2021. On 10 April 2023 he resigned from Trinamool Congress and also resigned from Rajya Sabha member of Parliament post under the ticket of TMC.

He is married to Rachel Faleiro and is the father of two sons - Lenin, Rabindra and only daughter Rania.

== Member of Goa Legislative Assembly ==
Faleiro has served as the MLA of Navelim Constituency for seven terms. He won the 1979 election with 7715 votes; the 1984 election with 9126 votes (the next candidate polled 3472 votes. The 1989 election without any opponent; the 1994 election with 8178 votes (the next candidate polled 1107 votes); the 1999 election with 12054 votes (the next candidate polled 2293 votes); and the 2003 election with 10254 votes (the next candidate polled 5668 votes).

In 2017, he won the elections from Navelim Constituency once again.

== Education ==
Faleiro holds a master's degree in Commerce and is also a Graduate in Law.
