= List of creole languages =

A creole language is a stable natural language developed from a mixture of different languages. Unlike a pidgin, a simplified form that develops as a means of communication between two or more groups, a creole language is a complete language, used in a community and acquired by children as their native language.

This list of creole languages links to Wikipedia articles about languages that linguistic sources identify as creoles. The "subgroups" list links to Wikipedia articles about language groups defined by the languages from which their vocabulary is drawn.

== Arabic-based creole languages ==
- Bongor Arabic
- Juba Arabic
- Nubi Arabic

== Assamese-based creole languages ==
- Nagamese creole, ("Naga Pidgin") is an Assamese-lexified creole language which, depending on location, has also been described and classified as an "extended pidgin" or "pidgincreole", Spoken natively by an estimated 30,000 people in the Indian northeastern state of Nagaland, India.
- Nefamese (or Arunamese) is a pidgin of Arunachal Pradesh (formerly NEFA), India. Its classification is unclear; Ethnologue states that it is based on the Assamese language, but also that it is most closely related to the Sino-Tibetan Gallong like the Assamese language formed out by the mixture of languages like Austroasiatic, Tibeto-Burman, Tai and Indo-European family of languages.

== Bengali-based creole languages ==
- Bishnupriya Manipuri, a creole of Bengali language and Meitei language (officially known as Manipuri language)

== Hindi-based creole languages ==
- Andaman Creole Hindi
- Arunachali Hindi
- Bombay Hindi
- Fiji Hindi
- Haflong Hindi

== Malay-based creole languages ==
See list of Malay creole languages

== English-based creole languages ==
Africa

- Cameroonian Creole, English, French and Native Cameroonian language based
- Krio language, English-based creole spoken throughout the nation of Sierra Leone
- Liberian Kreyol language, spoken in Liberia
- Nigerian Creole, English based creole or pidgin spoken in Nigeria

Americas

- Antiguan and Barbudan Creole, English-based, spoken throughout the Leeward Islands
  - Anguillan Creole, spoken on the island of Anguilla
  - Barbudan Creole, spoken on the island of Barbuda
  - Kokoy, spoken on the island of Dominica
  - Montserrat Creole, spoken on the island of Montserrat
  - North Antiguan Creole, spoken in the northern regions of the island of Antigua
  - Saint Kitts Creole, spoken on the island of St. Kitts
  - South Antiguan Creole, spoken in Saint Mary parish and the village of Swetes on the island of Antigua
- Bahamian Creole, English Creole spoken in The Bahamas
- Bajan Creole or Barbadian Creole, English-based, spoken in Barbados
- Belizean Creole, English-based creole spoken in Belize
- Gullah language, spoken in the coastal region of the US states of North and South Carolina, Georgia and northeast Florida
- Guyanese Creole, English-based, spoken in Guyana
- Jamaican Patois, English-based creole, spoken in Jamaica
- Ndyuka, English-based creole spoken in Suriname, the only creole that uses its own alphabet, called the Afaka script
- San Andrés–Providencia Creole, English-based creole spoken in (San Andrés and Providencia islands), Colombia
- Trinidadian Creole, English-based, spoken in Trinidad
- Saramaccan, English-based creole language of Suriname with vocabulary built based mainly on English, but also Portuguese, and West and Central African languages
- Sranan Tongo, English-based creole language and (lingua franca) spoken in Suriname

Asia

- Manglish, English-based, spoken in Malaysia
- Singlish, English-based, spoken in Singapore

Europe

- Angloromani, English-based, spoken in the United Kingdom

Oceania

- Australian Kriol, English-based, spoken in parts of Western Australia, Northern Territory, and Northern Queensland
- Bislama, an English-based creole, national and official language of Vanuatu
- Bonin English, an English-based creole spoken in the Ogasawara Islands of Japan
- Hawaiian Creole or Pidgin, a mixture of Native Hawaiian and American English similar to Tok Pisin
- Pitkern, Norfuk Spoken on the Pitcairn Islands and Norfolk Islands
- Tok Pisin, an official language of Papua New Guinea
- Torres Strait Creole or Brokan, spoken in far north-east Australia, Torres Strait, and south-west Papua

== Dutch-based creole languages ==
Americas:

- Berbice Creole Dutch, formerly spoken in the Berbice region of Guyana; extinct as of 2005 with the death of Bertha Bell.
- Jersey Dutch, formerly spoken by original settlers of New Netherland, as well Black people and Native Americans in the region of Bergen, Hudson, and Passaic counties; extinct as of 1960s.
- Mohawk Dutch, formerly spoken in the area around Albany, New York, by Dutch settlers, the Mohawk nation, and people of Dutch and Mohawk descent; extinct as of early 1900s.
- Negerhollands, formerly spoken in the Danish West Indies, now the U.S. Virgin Islands; extinct as of 1987 with the death of Alice Stevens.
- Skepi Creole Dutch, formerly spoken in the Essequibo region of Guyana, extinct as of 1998.

Asian:

- Javindo and Petjo, spoken by Indo people in Java, is likely extinct or endangered.

== French-based creole languages ==
- Antillean Creole, French-based creole spoken in the French West Indies
  - Dominican Creole French
  - Grenadian Creole French
  - Saint Lucian Creole, French-based creole spoken in Saint Lucia
- Bourbonnais Creoles, French-based creoles spoken in the Mascarene Islands, with influence from English, Portuguese, Hindi, Tamil and Malagasy
  - Agalega Creole
  - Chagossian Creole
  - Mauritian Creole
  - Reunion Creole
  - Rodriguan Creole
  - Seychellois Creole
- Chiac, French, English, Eastern Algonquian based, spoken in communities in The Maritimes of Canada
- Guianan Creole, French-based creole spoken in French Guiana
- Haitian Creole, French-based, an official language of Haiti
- Louisiana Creole, French-based, spoken in Louisiana
- Michif, French and Cree based, spoken by groups of the Métis People in Canada.
- Karipúna French Creole, spoken by the Karipuna people of Amapa, Brazil.

== Portuguese-based creole languages ==
- Americas:
  - Papiamento, spoken in the ABC islands in the southern Caribbean
- Upper Guinea and Cape Verde:
  - Cape Verdean Creole, spoken on the islands of Cape Verde
  - Guinea-Bissau Creole, spoken in Guinea-Bissau
- Gulf of Guinea:
  - Angolar Creole, spoken in the southernmost towns of São Tomé Island and sparsely along the coast.
  - Annobonese Creole, Portuguese-based creole spoken in Annobón, Equatorial Guinea
  - Forro Creole, spoken in São Tomé and Príncipe
  - Principense Creole, almost extinct, spoken in towns on Principe Island
- Indo-Portuguese creoles:
  - Bengali Portuguese Creole, formerly spoken in Hooghly, Dhaka, Chandernagore, Chittagong, and other cities in the Bengal region
  - Bombay Portuguese Creole, formerly spoken in Mumbai, Thane, and islands of Mumbai including Salsette and Mazagaon.
  - Cannanore Portuguese Creole, spoken in Kannur, Kerala, estimated less than 20 speakers remaining
  - Ceylon Portuguese Creole, spoken by Portuguese Burghers and Sri Lankan Kaffirs in Sri Lanka
  - Cochin Portuguese Creole, formerly spoken in Vypin Island and Fort Cochin in Kochi, Kerala; extinct as of 2010 with the death of William Rozario.
  - Daman and Diu Portuguese creole, also known as Daman and Diu Indo-Portuguese, refers to varieties of Portuguese-based creole spoken in Daman and Diu.
  - Goa Portuguese Creole, spoken by Goan Catholics in Goa.
  - Korlai Portuguese Creole, spoken in by Luso-Indian Catholics in villages around Korlai Fort, Maharashtra.
  - Norteiro Creole, formerly spoken by colonial ancestors of Luso-Indian Catholics in Vasai, Mumbai.
- Southeast Asia:
  - Kristang language, spoken in Malaysia and Singapore with diasporas in Perth, Western Australia
  - Macanese Patois, or Macau creole, Patuá , spoken in Macau in China
  - Thai Portuguese Creole, formerly spoken in the Bangkok neighborhood of Kudi Chin by Thai Catholics of Portuguese descent
  - Bayingyi, formerly spoken by the Bayingyi people of Myanmar of mixed Burmese and Portuguese descent.
  - Mardijker, formerly spoken by Mardijkers, a creole people native to Jakarta of Indonesian, Betawi, Dutch, Portuguese, Indian, and African descent; extinct as of 2010 with the death of Oma Mimi Abrahams.
  - Portuguis, formerly spoken on Ambon and Ternate in the Maluku Islands by Christians of mixed Portuguese and Moluccan ancestry.
  - Bidau Creole Portuguese, formerly spoken by Timorese mesticos in the Bidau neighborhood of Dili, East Timor.
  - Flores Creole Portuguese, formerly spoken by the Topasses and Nagi peoples in Larantuka and Maumere in Flores, Indonesia. Until then its position as a lingua franca was replaced by a Malay-based creole languages.

== Creole languages based on other languages ==
- Andaman Creole Hindi, a Hindi-Bengali-Tamil-based creole language spoken in the Andaman Islands
- Chavacano, a Spanish-based creole language spoken in the Philippines
- Dao, a Chinese–Tibetan creole language spoken in some areas of Yajiang County, Sichuan, China
- Hezhou, based on Uyghur and relexified by Mandarin
- Kituba language, a Kongo based creole language spoken in the Democratic Republic of the Congo
- Kutchi-Swahili, a Swahili-based creole spoken in Tanzania and Kenya
- Mednyj Aleut, a Russian-based creole once spoken on Medny Island and Bering Island
- Palenquero, a Spanish-based creole spoken in the town of San Basilio de Palenque
- Sango, Ngbandi-based creole language spoken in the Central African Republic
- Unserdeutsch, a German-based creole language spoken primarily in Australia and in parts in Papua New Guinea
- Yilan Creole Japanese, spoken by Atayal indigenous people in Hanhsi village, Yilan County, Taiwan

== Subgroups ==
- Arabic-based creole languages, a creole language which was significantly influenced by the Arabic language
- Chinese-based creole languages, a creole language that has been substantially influenced by the Mandarin Chinese language
- Dutch-based creole languages, a creole language that has been substantially influenced by the Dutch language
- English-based creole languages, a creole language derived from the English language
- French-based creole languages, a creole language based on the French language
- German-based creole languages, a creole language based on the German language
- Japanese-based creole languages, a creole language that has been substantially influenced by the Japanese language
- Malay-based creole languages, regional varieties derived from a lingua franca called Bazaar Malay
- Portuguese-based creole languages, creole languages which have Portuguese as superstrate language
- Spanish-based creole languages, a number of creole languages are based on the Spanish language

== See also ==
- Pidgin
- Middle English creole hypothesis
- List of macaronic languages
