= Indo-Portuguese creoles =

Creole languages of India

Indo-Portuguese Creole
- Native to: India, Sri Lanka & Bangladesh
- Native speakers: 5,000 (2006)
- Language family: Portuguese Creole: Indo-Portuguese Creole

Language codes
- ISO 639-3: idb
- Glottolog: indo1327 indo1318 bookkeeping code with extensive bibliography

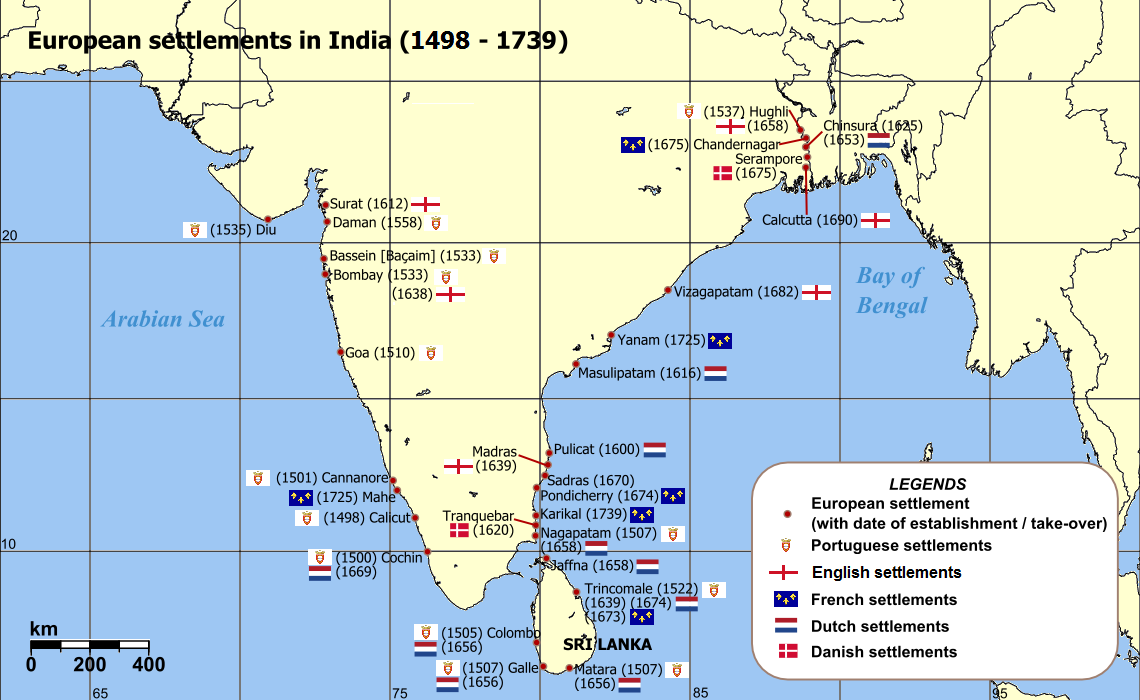
European settlements in present-day India and Sri Lanka between 1501 and 1739.

Indo-Portuguese creoles are the several Portuguese creoles spoken in the former settlements of Portuguese India, including those in Cochin (Kochi) of present-day Kerala (Malabar region), Bombay (Mumbai), Korlai, Bassein (Vasai), Goa, Damaon territory, the Chittagong of present-day Bangladesh, Portuguese Ceylon etc. These creoles are now mostly extinct or endangered. They have substantial Portuguese words in their grammars or lexicons:

- Ceylon Portuguese creole (Sri Lanka)
- Daman and Diu Portuguese creole
- Kristi language (Chaul/Korlai Portuguese creole)
- Norteiro creole (Bassein) †
- Bombay Portuguese creole †
- Goa Portuguese creole †
- Korlai Portuguese
- Cochin Portuguese creole †
- Cannanore Portuguese creole
- Bengali Portuguese creole †

The expression Indo-Portuguese may refer not only to the creoles but also to the creole people groups of Luso-Indians and Portuguese Burghers, who spoke them on the Indian subcontinent.

== See also ==
- European Portuguese
- Portuguese language in Goa (also called Goan Portuguese)
- Fort Cochin
- Fort Bassein
- Portuguese Empire
- Northern Province of Portuguese India (Provincia do Norte) (pt)
