= Cannanore Portuguese Creole =

Critically endangered creole language of India

Kannur Indo-Portuguese
- Native to: India
- Region: Kannur
- Native speakers: 20 or more dispersed around India and the world) (2010)
- Language family: Portuguese Creole: Indo-Portuguese Creoles; Kannur Indo-Portuguese

Language codes
- ISO 639-3: –
- Glottolog: None

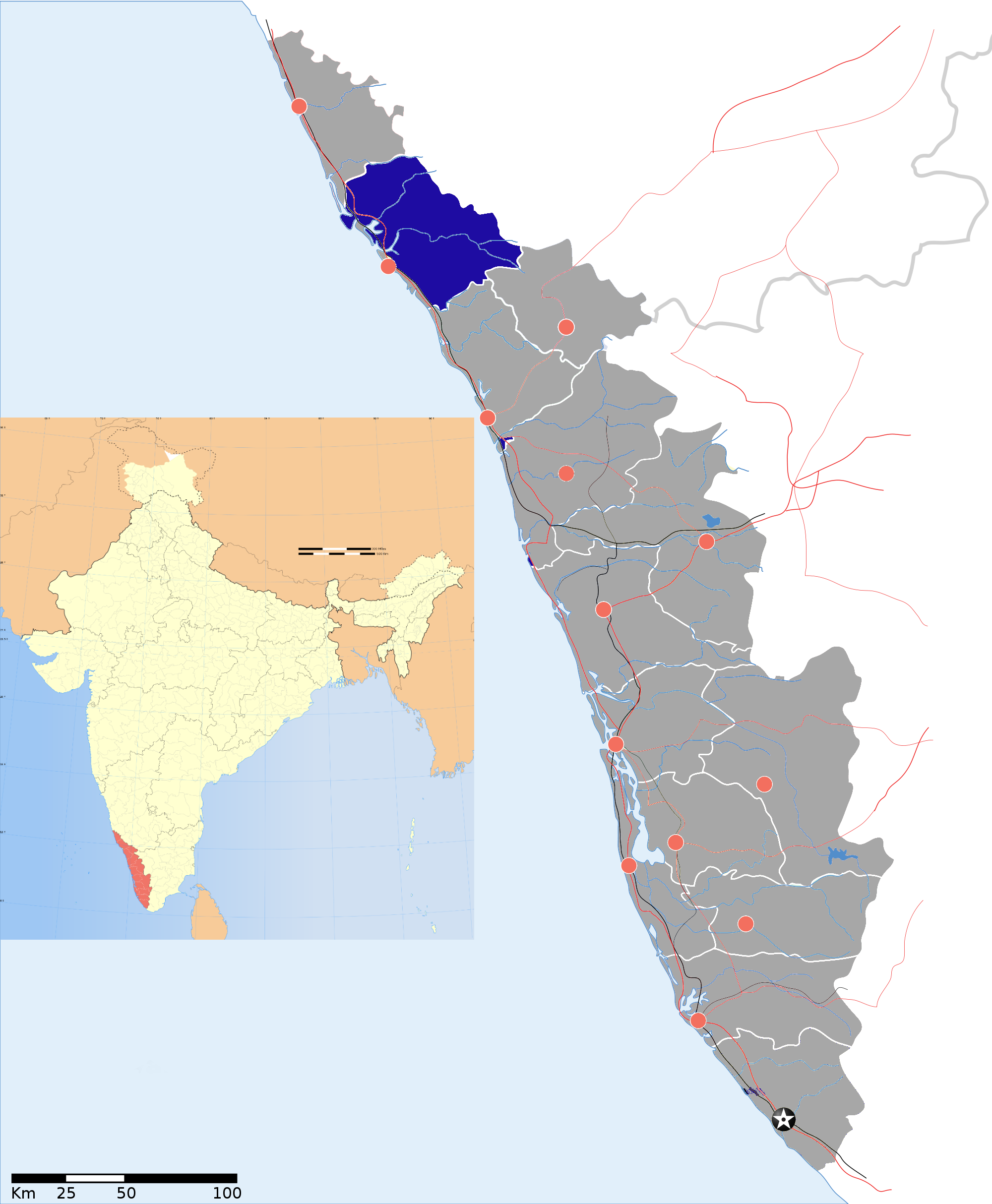

Kannur Indo-Portuguese is an Indo-Portuguese creole spoken on the Malabar coast of India. It formed from contact between the Portuguese and Malayalam languages in Indo-Portuguese households in the city of Kannur. In 2010 it was estimated to have five native speakers remaining. But there are around twenty or more who are dispersed in India and other parts of the world. The latest reference points out 8 known speakers in 2012, who were already in their sixties.

== Socio-historical background ==
The Portuguese rule in Southern India was brief. The first major settlement in Kannur was established in 1505, near a fort, as elsewhere in India. The direct Portuguese political and cultural influence ended in 1663 when the Dutch took the fort. Finally, this location fell under British hands in 1792, which kept the power until the second half of the 20th century. The creole-speaking community in Kannur has always been relatively small. According to Baldaeus (1703), by the time of the Dutch conquest, the fort could accommodate about 250 men and in the village there were about 70 Christian families, either Eurasian or native. Moreover, in the 16th century, Malayalam was (and still is) the dominant language in the region. Thus, the creole speakers are at least bilingual.

Kannur and Sri Lanka creole share a similar historical background but differ in the substrate language, the community size, and the territorial size.
