= St. Andrews, Kerala =

St. Andrews Santo Andarae
- Hamlet (place)
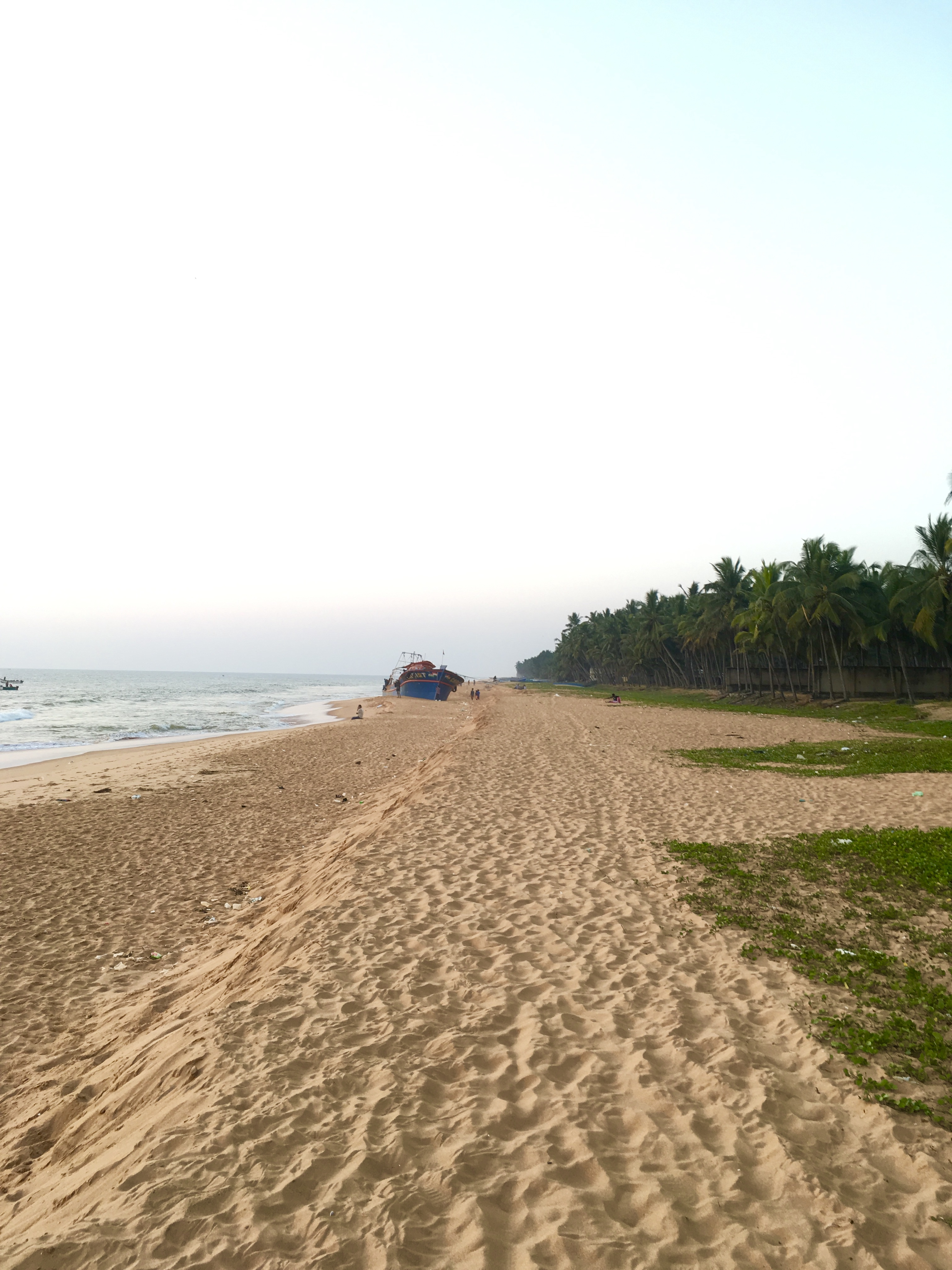
- St. Andrews Beach
- Interactive map of St. Andrews
- Coordinates: 8°33′50″N 76°50′39.3″E
- Country: India
- State: Kerala
- District: Thiruvananthapuram
- City: Thiruvananthapuram
- Named for: St.Andrew the Apostle
- Elevation: 11 m (36 ft)

Languages
  - Official: Malayalam, English
- Time zone: UTC+5:30 (IST)
- Vehicle registration: KL-22
- Website: http://www.standrews.co.in

St. Andrews is a seaside hamlet located in the city of Thiruvananthapuram, Thiruvananthapuram district of Kerala. It is situated 19 km (12 mi) northwest of city centre, 16 km (9.9 mi) from Thiruvananthapuram International Airport. It is known for its pristine beach (St. Andrews Beach). It is a hamlet with a "melting pot" of several cultures and traditions. The village is mostly covered with coconut palms. Its western side edges the Arabian sea, while the east is separated by Parvathi Puthannaar, a manmade canal completed during the time of Regent Sethu Lakshmi Bayi of Travancore Kingdom. Access to National Highway (NH 66) and a railway station is as short as 3 km (1.9 mi) and the Vikram Sarabhai Space Center (VSSC) of the Indian Space Research Organization (ISRO) is close by.

== Location ==
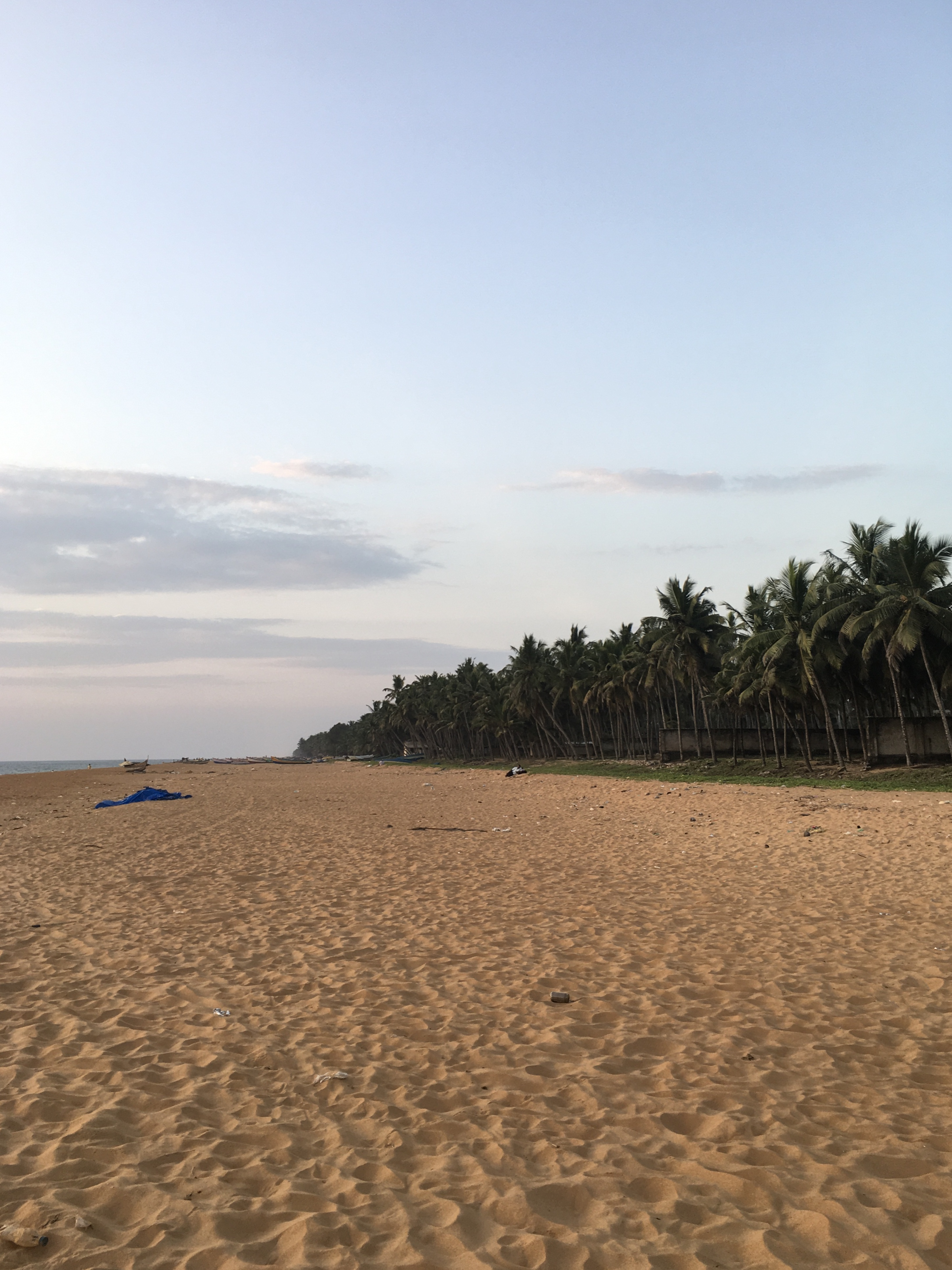
St. Andrews Beach during low tides

St. Andrews is 15 km (9.3 mi) from Thiruvananthapuram International Airport and 4 km (2.5 mi) from Kazhakoottam. Its western side edges the Arabian sea, while the east is separated by Parvathi Puthannaar, a man-made canal completed during the time of Regent Sethu Lakshmi Bayi of Travancore Kingdom. Its northern side is bounded by the village of Puthenthope and the southern side is bounded by the locality of Kochu Vettukad. The Veli-Perumathura Road runs through the hamlet.

== History ==
History attests to the fact that St. Andrews and the neighboring village of Puthenthope were Portuguese settlements. The name St. Andrews itself is derived from the Portuguese "Sandandarae" or "Santo Andarae" which means St. Andrew. The historical records from the Travancore regime shows a place Sandandare west of Kazhakoottam and Chempazhanthy.

== Culture ==
St. Andrews is a unique melting pot of different cultures, with a rich Luso-Indian heritage. The Portuguese influence has lent distinctiveness to the culture of the place which finds its manifestations especially in the language and food.

=== Tamil Influence ===
Apart from its obvious European heritage, St. Andrews also has a Tamil influence as people from Tamil Nadu settled here in the past mainly for the purpose of trade. Traces of Tamil culture has its influence and reflection in the church songs which used to be sung in Tamil also.

=== Portuguese Legacy ===
The most singular and distinctive influence on St. Andrews without doubt remains the Portuguese legacy. Because of the Portuguese influence the food prepared in many household in St. Andrews bears an uncanny resemblance to Goan cuisine. They have a unique taste, flavor, and even have names different from that of typical Kerala cuisine.

The distinctive food habits in St. Andrews have led to some interesting culinary observations. For instance, Pork Vindaloo which is popular in St. Andrews, and also in some parts of Kollam and Cochin is also popular in Goan and Anglo-Indian cuisine. Thought the taste of vindaloo curry differs, all the dishes have the common tangy taste. The similar food traits have been brought in by Portuguese or by Christian missionaries from Goa.

The dishes which have a clear Portuguese originated which is still popular in this are includes: Pork Vindaloo, Baked Chicken Mince, Scone, Tharidosi (Coconut cake), Orapam, Churi Appam and Plum Cake. But the most sought after delicacy of St. Andrews is the Milk Halwa which remains exclusive to this region. Even though it is termed as Milk Halwa, maybe because of its distinct European influence, it has no similarities with the traditional halwas with which Keralites are familiar. Moreover, only a few persons remain who has the knowledge to make this delicious sweet.

The Portuguese influence can also be seen in the language spoken here.

Several members of the community have immigrated to countries like Sri Lanka, Singapore and Malaysia over the past years, further adding to the diversity of its food by introducing new culinary practices. Because of this fact, St. Andrews has the enviable position of a seaside hamlet with a melting pot of several cultures and traditions.

== Religion ==
=== Latin Catholic ===
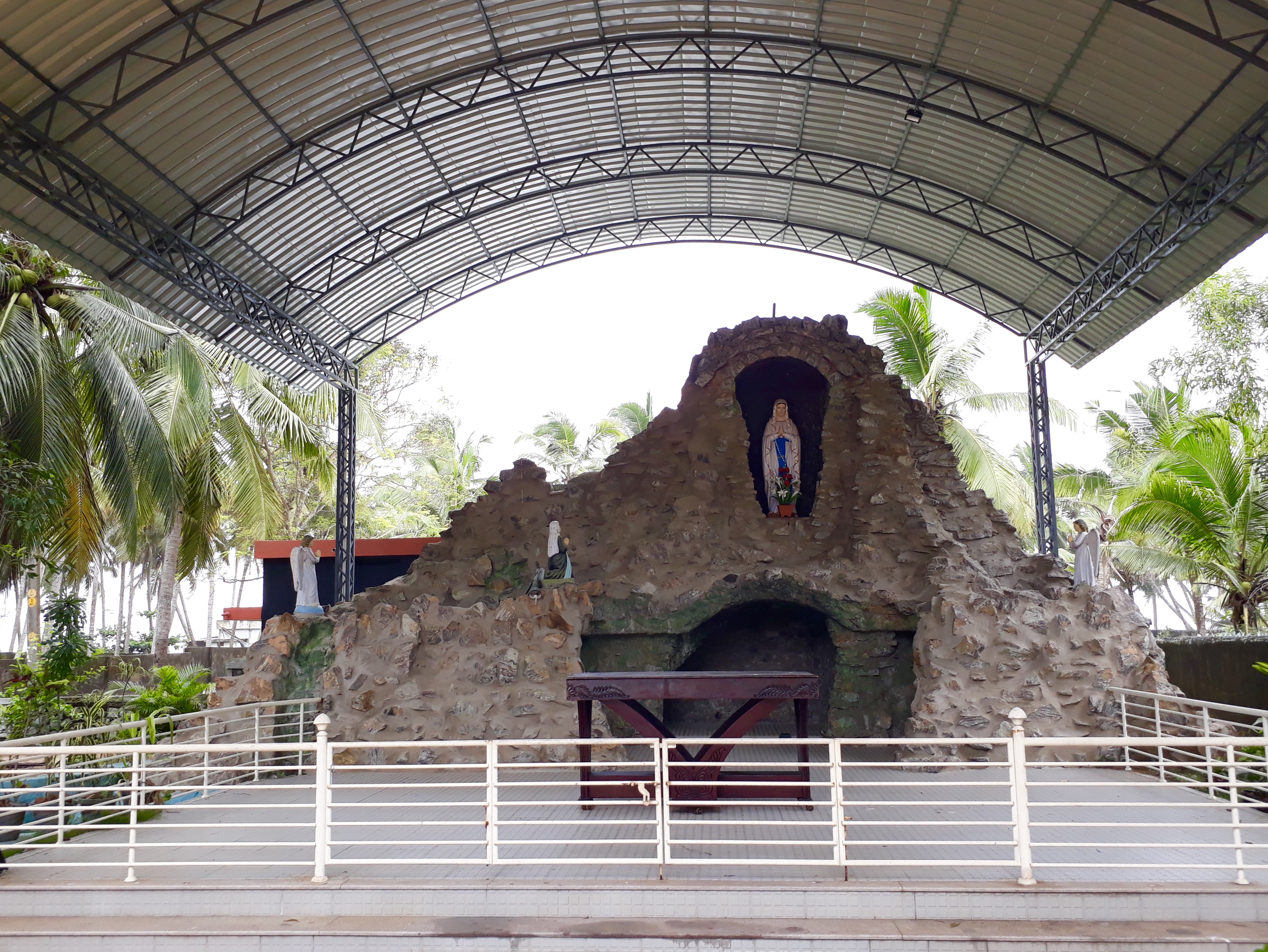
St. Andrews Grotto

St. Andrews’ residents mainly belong to the Latin Catholic Christian community.

=== St. Andrews Church ===
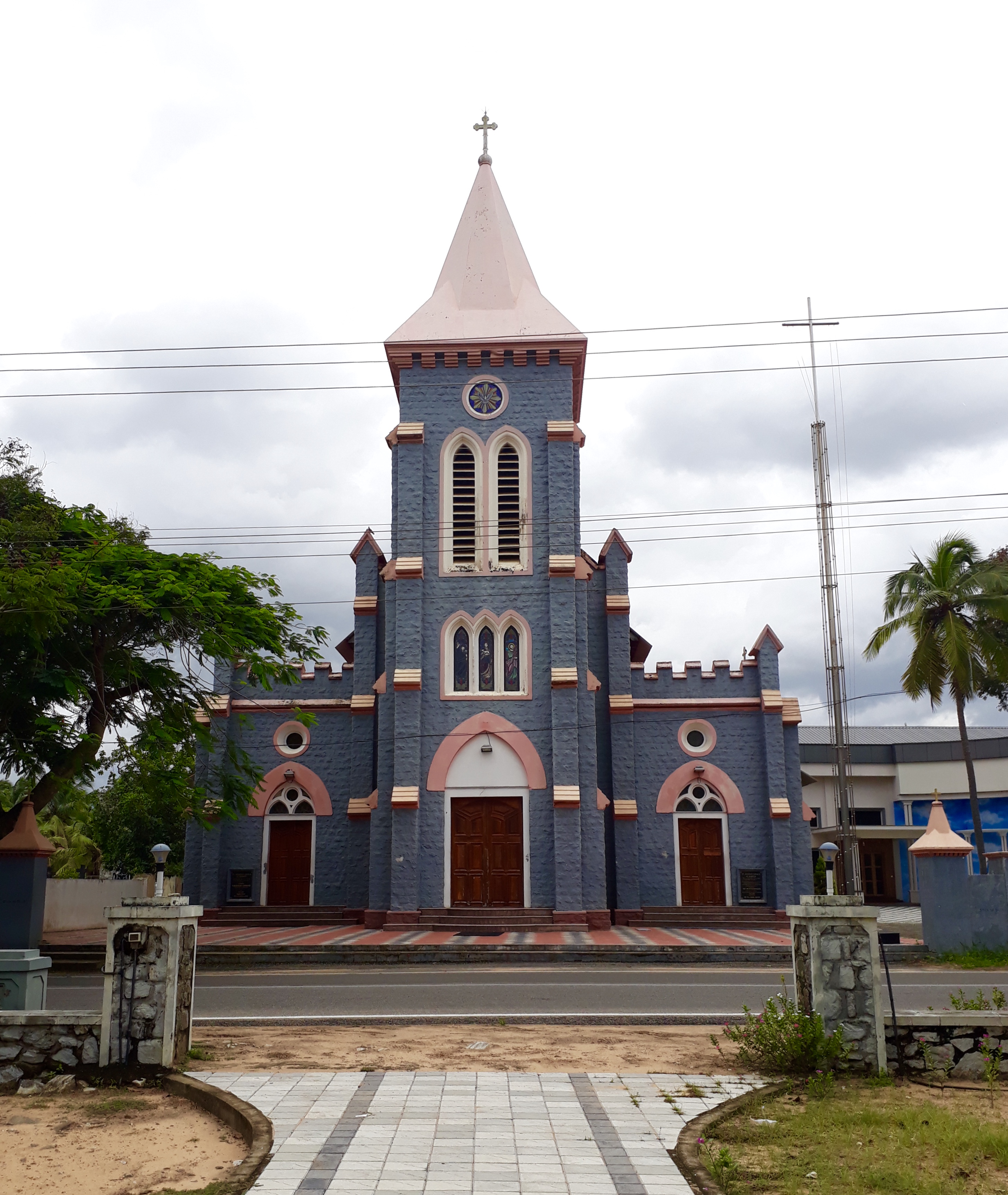
St. Andrews Church - The center of all religious and social activities

A church facing the sea, which was named after St. Andrew, the patron saint of fishermen and singers. The St. Andrews Parish church started taking shape in the year 1918. This parish belongs to the Roman Catholic Archdiocese of Trivandrum. About 480 families belong to this parish. The parish also has a Parish hall where various events relating to the parish are conducted.

The church remains a unique landmark in the tapestry of the village as it has the rare distinction of having the place name and church name as one. The church has a rich heritage dating back to the Portuguese. The church was initially made of Rosewood but now as years passed it has taken on modern form but has managed to retain its heritage nature. The fishing hamlet comes alive with a lot of festivities on during the Christmas-New Year season and also on St. Andrews Day which is celebrated with much fan fare on 30 November.

St. Andrews Grotto is located on the opposite side of the church close to the beach.

== Institutions ==
=== Schools ===
- Jyothi Nilayam School, Thiruvananthapuram which is owned and administered by Ursuline Sisters of Mary Immaculate. This school is affiliated to CBSE.
- St. Andrews Upper Primary School

=== College ===
- Xavier Institute of Management (part of St. Xavier's College)

=== Convent ===
- Ursuline Convent

=== Banks ===
- State Bank of India
- Union Bank of India

=== Post Office ===
- St. Xavier's College Post Office

=== Establishments ===
- Ann's Bakery
- Joy Store
- SM Stores, St. Andrews
- St. Antony's Aquarium Shop
- Capitan's Cafe
- Mom's Magic Bakery & Restaurant
- Orchard Supermarket
- Muthoot Fincorp

=== Sports Venues ===
- St. Andrews Ground - mainly Football and Cricket
- The Box - Badminton Court
- FASC Ground
- St. Xavier's College Football Ground
- St. Xavier's College KCA Ground

=== Homestay ===
- Ocean View Homestay and Yoga Centre

== Accessibility ==
St. Andrews is situated 3 km (1.9 mi) west off National Highway 66 (Kazhakoottam) by road. The hamlet is accessible by St. Andrews Road, heading from NH 66. It is situated 4 km (2.5 mi) from Kaniyapuram Railway Station and 6 km (3.7 mi) from Kazhakoottam Railway Station. It is located 14 km (8.7 mi) from Trivandrum International Airport.

== Events and celebrations ==
- Christmas
- New Year
- Easter
- St. Andrews Day - Includes procession along the boundaries of the Parish.
- St. Andrews Ground Sports Fest during Christmas-New Year season.

== See also ==
- More information about St. Andrews can be obtained from
- Jyothi Nilayam School is situated in St Andrews
