= Norteiro people =

Norteiros
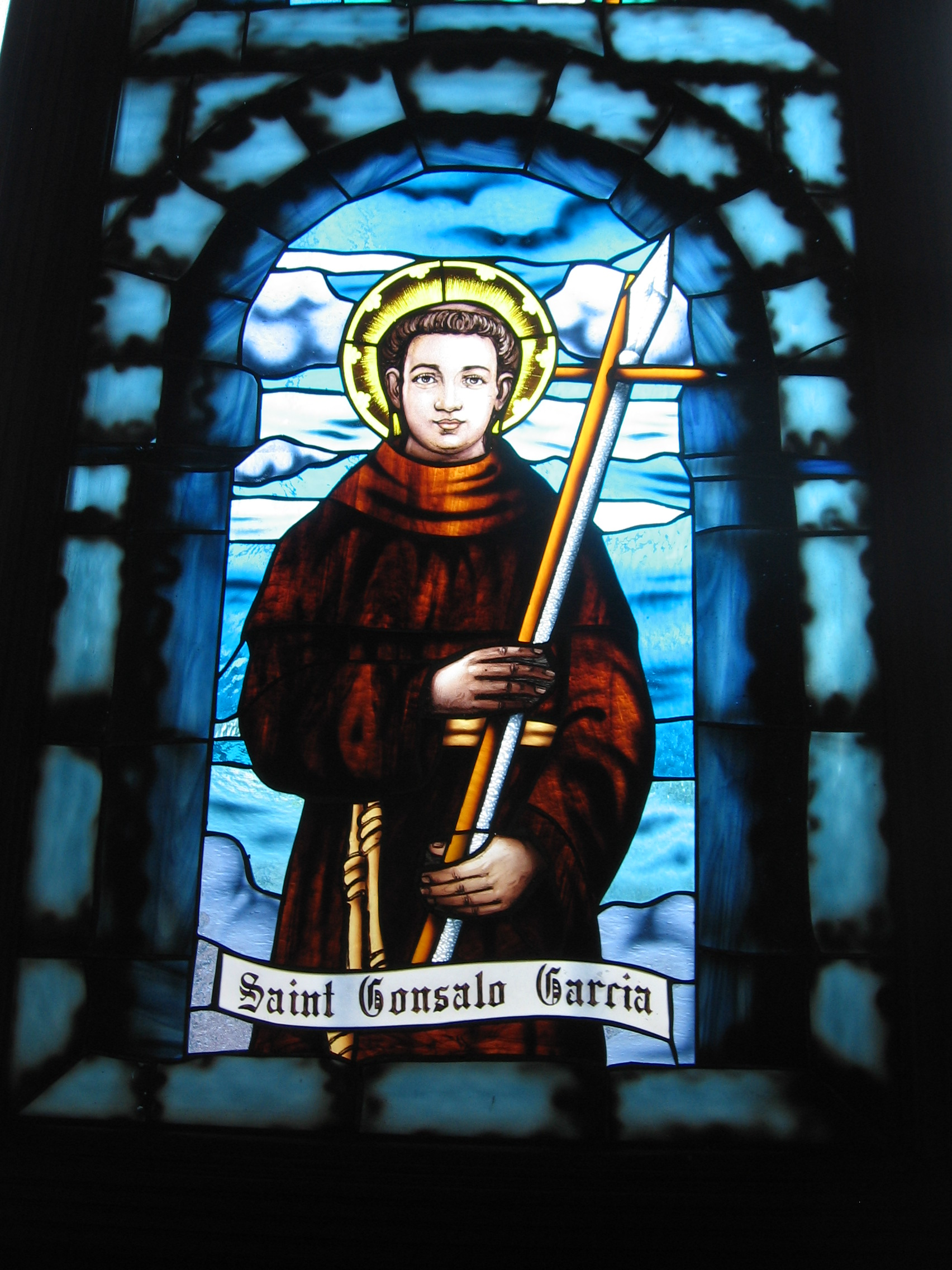
- Gonsal Garcia of Bassein, a Norteiro Catholic saint

Regions with significant populations
- Província do Norte: 0 (extinct)

Languages
- Primary: Konkani; Additional: Portuguese

Religion
- Roman Catholicism

Related ethnic groups
- Other Konkani and East Indian people & Luso-Indian; Descendants: Bombayers, Basseinites, Damanese people, Korlai Portuguese people of Chaul,

Norteiros (literally "Northerners") were a historical people who lived in the former Portuguese exclaves of the western littoral parts of the northern Konkan region, in the present-day Greater Bombay Metropolitan Area and the Damaon territory.

Norteiro means "northerner" in the European Portuguese language and its Indo-Portuguese creoles; the term referred to the people inhabiting the territory of the Northern Province (Província do Norte), centred in and around the present-day Bassein (Vasai), headquartered at Fort San Sebastian of Bassein which was styled "the Court of the North" (A Corte do Norte). It included the Bombay harbour and stood second only to the capital (metropole) of Velha Goa in south Konkan, among Portuguese East Indies colonies in Portuguese India.

Norteiro has largely fallen into disuse, the descendants are the Luso-Indians as in the case of the Damanese of Damaon territory and the Korlaite Christians of Chaul, the natives identify as the Bombay East Indians, that is those Christians who inhabit Bassein (Vasai), Old Bombay, New Bombay and other locales in Greater Bombay. The latter are still known as Nodtheir (male), Nodtheirni (female) and Nodtheira (plural) in the Konkani language.

== Culture ==
Except for Dio district, which lies in the historical "Sorath" or Saurashtra (region), the remaining settlements were all within the north Konkan region, partitioned between the union territory of Damaon, Diu & Silvassa and Maharashtra state. They were populated predominantly by native Konkani people.

Basseinites spoke a distinct Norteiro creole of Indo-Portuguese, it was described in detail and compared with other varieties by Rodolf Dalgado.

== History ==
=== Capture of Bassein ===
During the period of Peshva Brahminical rule of the Mahratta confederacy, territory of Portuguese Bombay was sacked repeatedly whenever the Portuguese refused to pay the "protection tax" to stop Mahratta raids. Under the Peshva, Mahrattas seized and occupied most of the settlements, including the territorial administrative centre headquartered at Fort Bassein. A brother to the Peshva Brahmins, Chimaji Appa ordered the destruction and vandalism of nearly all Christian places in the area including Basilica of Mount Bandra (Bombay), the St. Michael's Church (Bombay) was one of the few structures spared. Mahratta jaatis (castes) didn't discriminate among the two religious groups, and many Norteiros switched loyalties, they also switched to speaking Marathi in place of Konknni in the Konkan region. When the English East India Company later took over the seven islands of Bombay from the Portuguese at Goa and Anjediva, and Bassein (Vasai) and Taana (Trombay) from the Mahrattas, they called the Norteiros "Bombay Portuguese".

=== British era ===
After the involvement of England in Goan affairs as a result of the French Revolutionary Wars and the Napoleonic Wars, England occupied Portuguese Goa for several years, ostensibly to protect it from a French takeover. The Goans were encouraged to migrate to Bombay and find employment. Because of the influx of Goans, called "Goan Portuguese" by the English, the "Bombay Portuguese" decided to rename themselves with a name emphasising their status as subjects of the English Crown, to distinguish them from the Goans, who were Portuguese citizens (since Pombal enfranchised Goa). These Norteiros began calling themselves "Bombay East Indians", to identify with the English East India Company which ruled them on behalf of England.

Other communities, such as that of Kristi creole people of Chaul, Damaon and Dio, continued to identify Luso-Indians.

Both the Damanese and the Kristi communities are often wrongly called Norteiro people, derived from the native Marathi people. However, the Dioese, Damaonese and Kristi Norteiros share a single trait, as compared to the Bombay East Indians who are culturally different from them.

== See also ==
- History of Konkan
- Konkani people
- Marathi people
