= Luso-Indian =

Indians of Portuguese birth or descent

Luso-Indians
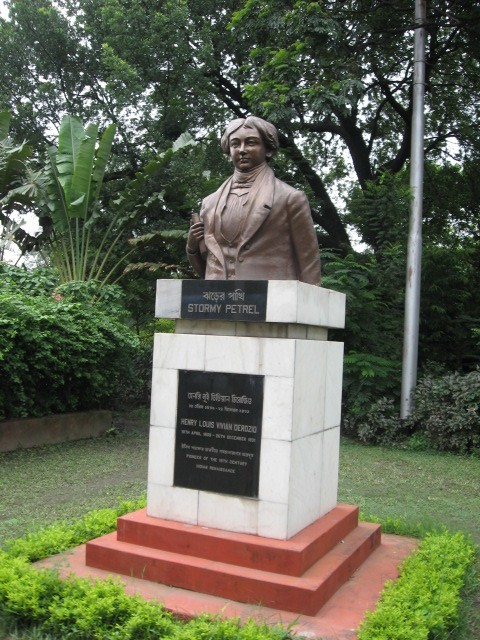
- Henry Louis Vivian Derozio

Total population
- ~200,000

Regions with significant populations
- Goa · Gujarat · Mumbai · Vasai · Dadra and Nagar Haveli and Daman and Diu · Kerala · Tamil Nadu · Portugal · Caribbean · Brazil

Languages
- Predominantly: European Portuguese, including Damaon and Dio Portuguese creole & Korlai Indo-Portuguese and other Indo-Portuguese Creoles · Konkani · English • Malayalam • Tamil •

Religion
- Roman Catholicism, minority of Hinduism

Related ethnic groups
- Luso-Asians, Luso-Burmese, Portuguese Burghers, Anglo-Indians, Anglo-Burmese • Goan Catholics, Mangalorean Catholics, Karwari Catholics, Damanese people & Bombay East Indian Catholics

Luso-Indians are people of mixed Portuguese and Indian descent, as well as those who identify culturally with Portuguese colonial heritage in India. While many have partial European ancestry, others are descendants of Indian converts who adopted Portuguese surnames and customs during the colonial period. The group originated during Portuguese rule in Goa, Daman, Diu, Dadra and Nagar Haveli, and other coastal enclaves like Chaul / Korlai, where colonial authorities and missionaries encouraged intermarriage between Portuguese settlers and local communities. Over time, a distinct Indo-Portuguese identity emerged, blending European and Indian elements.

== Demographics ==
Luso-Indian Population in India from 1951 to 2011
Year	Population
1951	▼30,932
1961	▼27,480
1971	▼23,550
1981	▼19,280
1991	▼15,050
2001	▼10,440
2011	▼7,360

== History ==
=== Early history ===
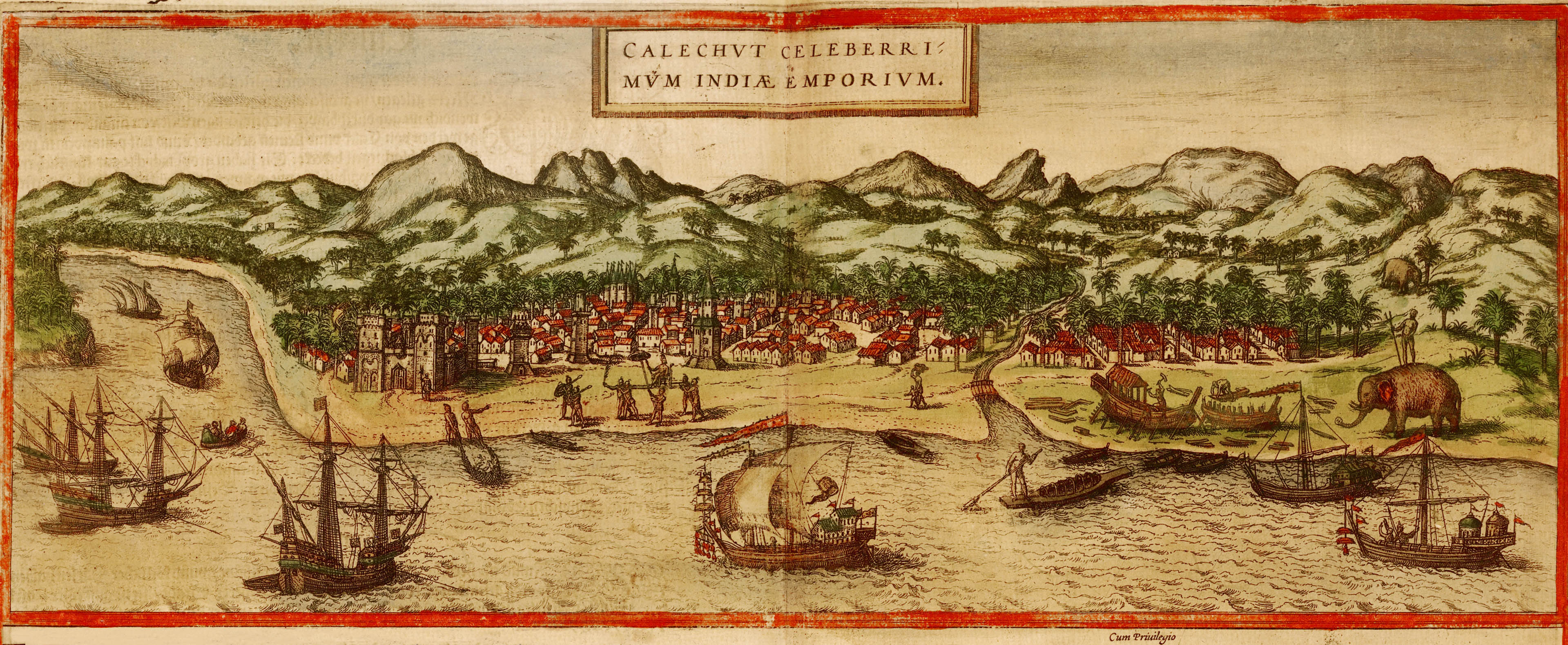
City of Calicut, India, c. 1572 (from Georg Braun and Frans Hogenberg's atlas Civitates orbis terrarum)

In the 16th century, a thousand years after the collapse of the Western Roman Empire, the Portuguese became the first European power to begin trading in the Indian Ocean. They were in South India a few years before the Moghuls appeared in the North. In the early 16th century, they set up their trading posts (factories) throughout the coastal areas of the Indian and Pacific Oceans, with their capital in Goa in West India on the Konkan Coast.

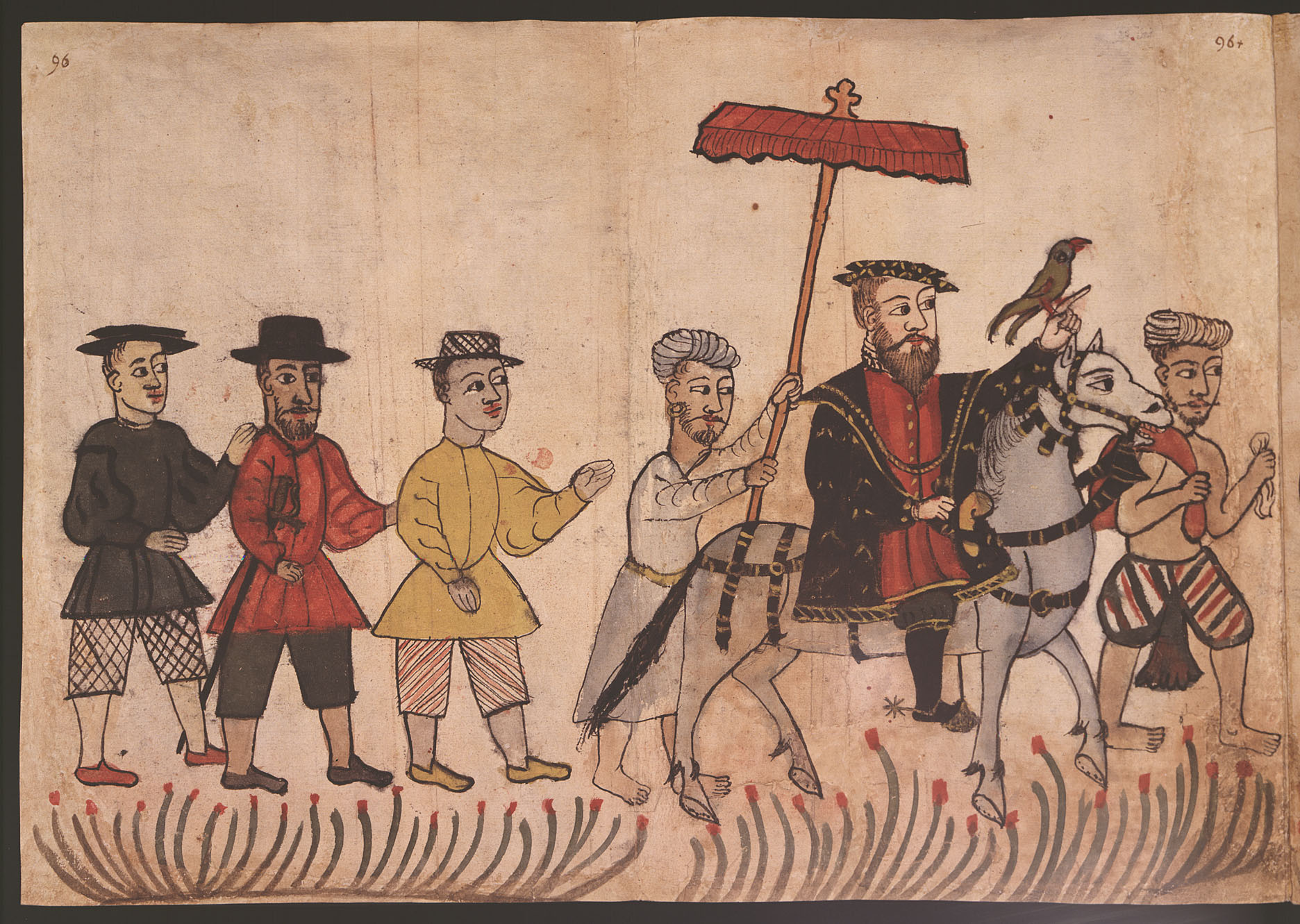

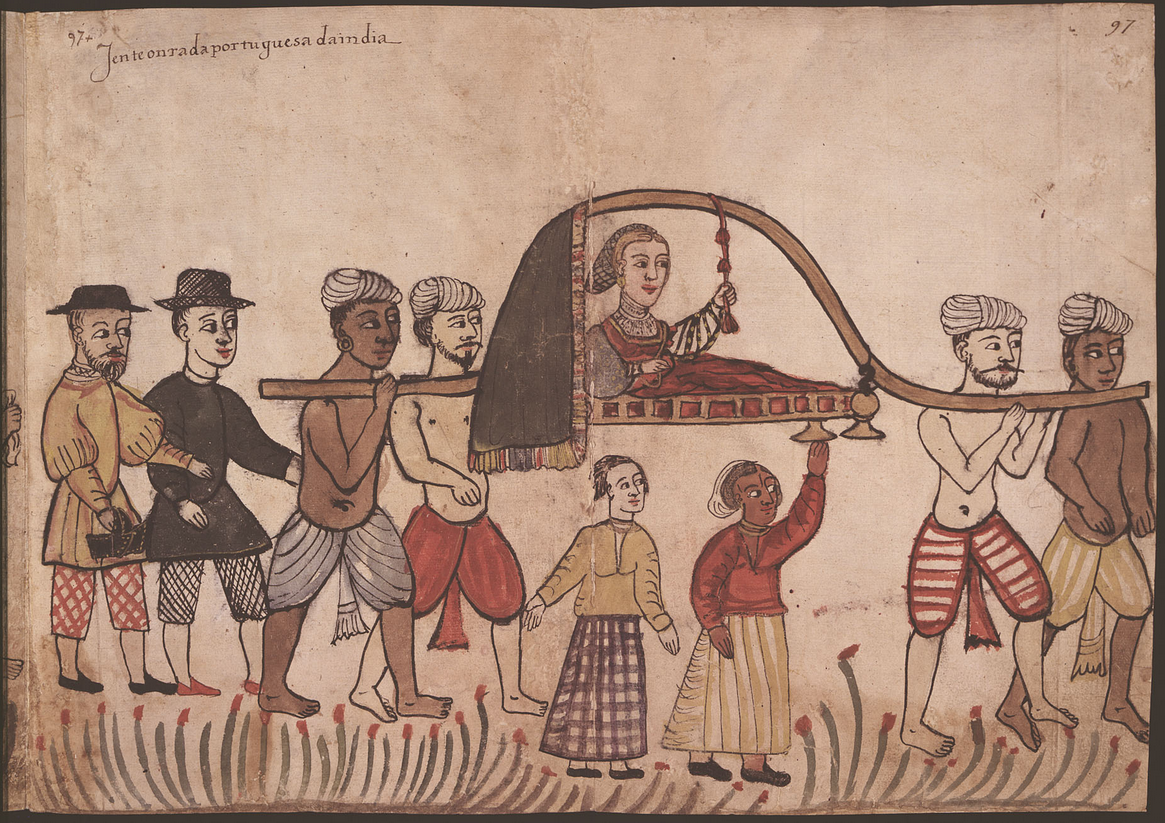
A Portuguese nobleman, a Portuguese noblewoman (likely his wife), and their retinue, India, c. 1540

In 1498, the number of Europeans residents in the area was a few tens of thousands. Admiral Afonso de Albuquerque, in post as governor of Portuguese India from 1509-1515, encouraged his soldiers to marry native women, a policy known as Politicos dos casamentos. Colonial authorities and Jesuit missionaries promoted intermarriage between Portuguese men and Indian women, often Christian converts, to consolidate influence. Dowries and social incentives were offered to encourage such unions, while widows and orphans under church supervision sometimes faced coercive pressure to marry settlers. As a counterpoint to this, the Portuguese state moved girls and women to India, Goa in particular. These Órfãs do Rei, "orphans of the king", were expected to marry the male settlers; later, this extended to natives with high status. By 1580, Goa was a sophisticated city with its own brand of Indo-Portuguese society, and its own language.

Some observers expressed disdain towards the Portuguese community in India. Parson Terry, writing in 1616, stated that "The truth is that the Portuguese, especially those who are born in the Indian colonies, most of them a mix'd seed begotten upon the natives, are a very low, poor-spirited people, called therefore the Gallinas Del Mar, the hens of the sea!"

Abuses were also recorded during this period. The Goa Inquisition (1560–1812) prosecuted Hindus and Christians suspected of heresy, resulting in confiscations, punishments, and forced conversions. Historians note that women and lower-caste converts were particularly vulnerable, with their marriages and social mobility often controlled by the church and colonial authorities. At the same time, members of the emerging Luso-Indian community gained positions in trade, administration, and the clergy, which helped sustain their social prominence.

=== Arrival of other Europeans ===
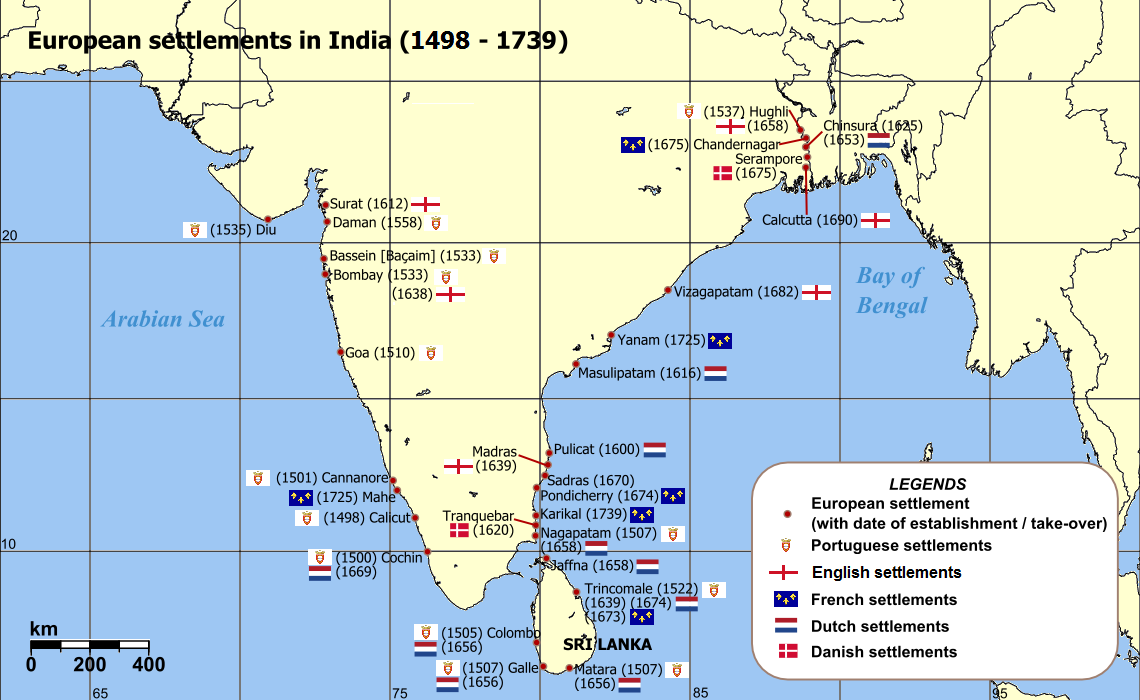
Portuguese and other European settlements in 1726

The English, French and Dutch East India Companies became active in Far East trading in a meaningful way about a hundred and fifty years after the Portuguese. They too set up their posts throughout the Indian Ocean. By the middle of the 17th century, there were several thousand Portuguese and Luso-Indians in India and a relatively small population of other Indian-Europeans.

By the end of the 17th century, the East India Companies had established three major trading posts in India – Fort St. George (Chennai), Fort St William (Kolkata) and Bombay Island. In 1670, the Portuguese population in Madras numbered around 3000.

Nevertheless, the Luso-Indian community retained its identity through its religious institutions, Portuguese surnames, and distinctive cultural practices.

== Portuguese speaking communities in Republic of India ==
=== Korlai ===
Korlai is central to a small thriving community of Indo-Portuguese Christians, settled for nearly 500 years on the western coast of India at Chaul near Mumbai. This is one of the only 16th century Portuguese-speaking communities in India today, where the language has, over the decades, metamorphosed to Korlai Portuguese creole, a variant mix of the 16th century Portuguese & local Indian languages. The Portuguese left Korlai & Chaul around 1740, and the language also survived due to Portuguese speaking priests, as the priestly diocese was under Goa till early 1960s. It has vigorous use and it is also known as Kristi ("Christian"), Korlai Creole Portuguese, Korlai Portuguese, or Nou Ling ("our language" in the language itself). The surviving community of 1,600 highlights the cultural diversity, integrity and the extensive trade links of historical India. The place also boasts to be an area where Christian, Hindus, Muslims, and Jews have been living together in harmony since centuries within the same region and yet proudly relate themselves as Indians today.

=== Goa ===
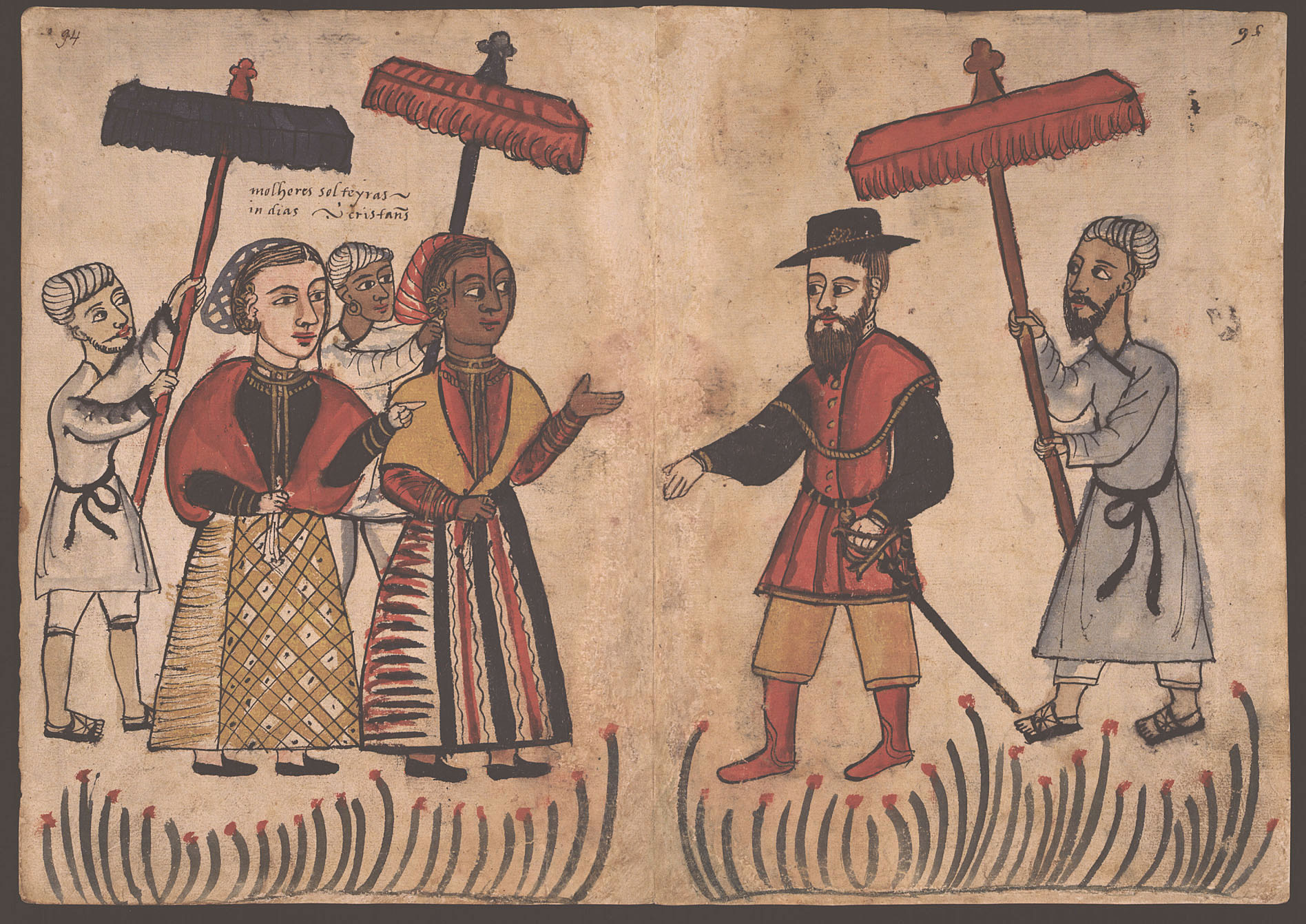
Portuguese nobleman proposing to a Goan Catholic woman, c. 1540

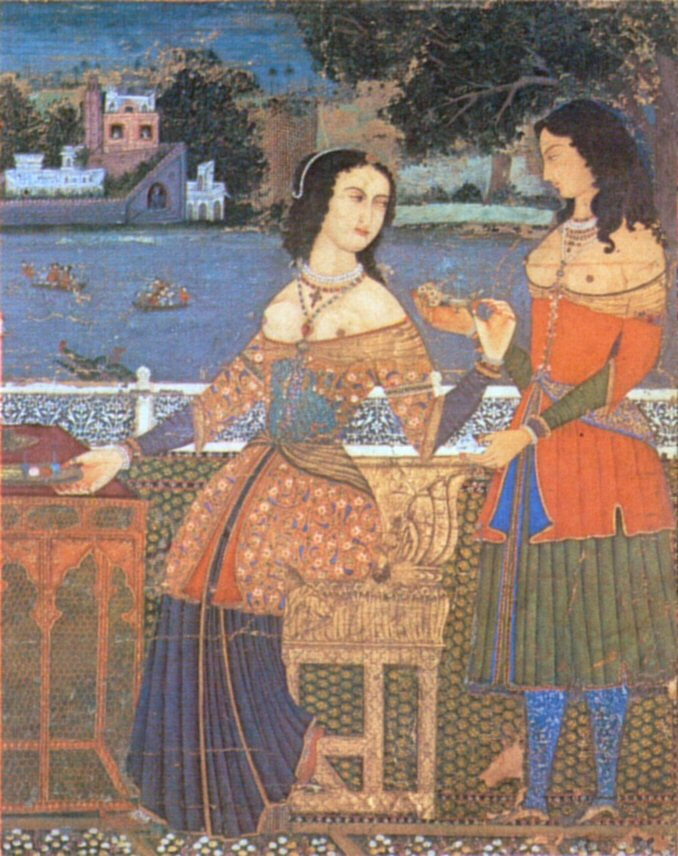
Portuguese women in Goa, early 18th century

Goa was the capital of Portuguese India from 1530 and was called "Rome of the East". The Luso-Goans came into existence following intermarriages between the Portuguese soldiers and native Goan women in the aftermath of the Portuguese conquest of Goa in 1510. Luso-Goans spoke Konkani and Portuguese with the present generation also speaking English, and write Konkani in the Roman script. Portuguese was the language of overseas province governance, however Portuguese now spoken as a first language only by a minority of Goans, mainly upper-class Catholic families and the older generation. However, the annual number of Goans learning Portuguese as a second language has been continuously increasing in the 21st century.

The last newspaper in Portuguese ended publication in 1980s (i.e. O Heraldo switched from Portuguese to English overnight in the mid Eighties). However, the "Fundação do Oriente" and the Indo–Portuguese Friendship Society (Sociedade de Amizade Indo-Portuguesa) are still active. Many signs in Portuguese are still visible over shops and administrative buildings in Goan cities like Panjim, Margão and Vasco da Gama. After the Liberation of Goa, the Indian government has changed the Portuguese names of many places and institutes.

There is a department of Portuguese language at the Goa University and the majority of Luso-Goan students choose Portuguese as their third language in schools. Luso-Goans have a choice to either be fully Portuguese citizens or fully Indian citizens or fully Portuguese citizens with an OCI (Overseas citizenship of India) granted by the Indian nationality law.

Those Luso-Goans of noble descent have a well-documented family history and heritage recorded and maintained in various archives in Portugal and Goa. During the absolute monarchy, Luso-Goan nobles enjoyed the most privileged status in Goa and held the most important offices. With the introduction of the Pombaline reforms in the 1750s and then the constitutional monarchy in 1834, the influence of the nobles decreased substantially.

After Portugal became a republic in 1910, some Luso-Goan descendants of the nobility at Goa continued to bear their families' titles according to standards sustained by the Portuguese Institute of Nobility (Instituto da Nobreza Portuguesa), traditionally under the authority of the head of the formerly ruling House of Braganza.

=== Kerala ===
In Kochi, the first European settlement of India, the Portuguese settled in areas like Mulavukad, Vypeen, Gothuruth and Fort Kochi. They intermarried with the local Malayali population and children thus born were called mestiços (Dutch: Topasses). They spoke a Creole language called Cochin Portuguese Creole. The Portuguese rule lasted for 150 years until the Dutch annexed Cochin. The Portuguese mestiços were allowed to remain under Dutch rule and even thrived during the subsequent British occupation and later independence. They have their own unique culture and dressing style and a cuisine that is heavily based on Portuguese cuisine.

St. Andrews is a locality in Trivandrum with a history of Portuguese influence. This is evident in the area's culture, particularly its language and cuisine. Historical records indicate that both St. Andrews and the nearby village of Puthenthope were sites of Portuguese settlements. The name "St. Andrews" itself is derived from the Portuguese "Sandandarae" or "Santo Andarae," referring to St. Andrew. Records from the Travancore era mention a place called Sandandare located west of Kazhakoottam and Chempazhanthy.

Luso-Indians now number about 40,000 in Kochi and are the main center for Anglo-Indian affairs in Kerala. There are also Catholic families with Portuguese surnames in Kochi, Kannur, Tellicherry, Kollam, and Calicut (no longer in Mahé). Among them, English replaced Portuguese Creole as their family language one, two, or three generations ago, so they usually claim that they are Anglo-Indian (or Eurasian) instead of Portuguese, as would have been the case up to the 19th century.

=== Elsewhere ===
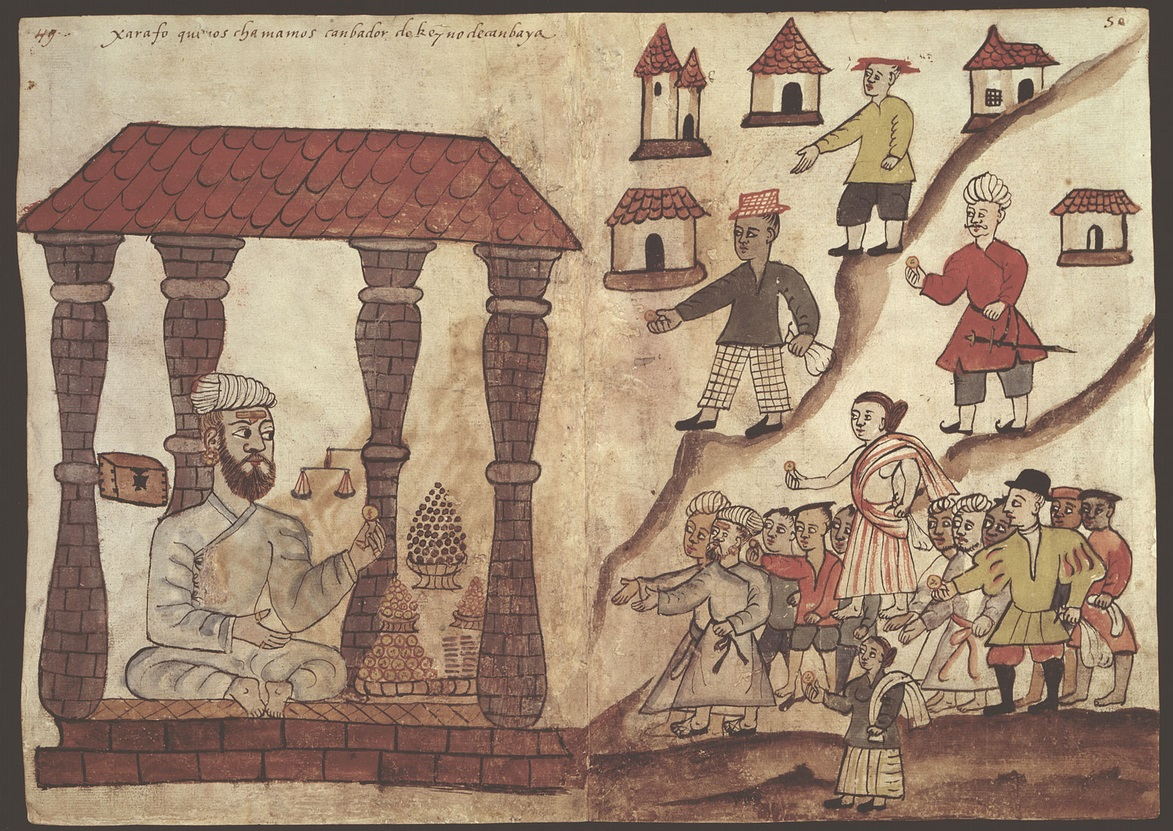
Portuguese man (lower right, in yellow) amongst the customers of a Gujarati moneychanger, Códice Casanatense (c. 1540)

In the Coromandel Coast, Luso-Indians were generally known as Topasses. They were Catholics and spoke Portuguese Creole. When England began to rule in India, they began to speak English in place of the Portuguese and also anglicised their names. They are, now, part of the Eurasian community. In Negapatam, in 1883, there were 20 families that spoke Creole Portuguese. There are currently about 2,000 people who speak Creole Portuguese in Damão while in Diu the language is nearly extinct.

In North India, Luso-Indians are only present in Kanpur. During the 18th century, Kanpur was an important Portuguese trade centre and had a large Portuguese population which declined after colonization by British forces. Portuguese form the large ethnic group among Ethnic communities in Kanpur at present and about 1,200 people are buried in the city's Portuguese Cemetery.

Bondashil, located in the Badarpur district of South Assam, had a Portuguese settlement of about 40 families back in the 17th century. Other in Rangamati in Goalpara district of Assam and Mariamnagar on the outskirts of Tripura’s capital Agartala.

== Portuguese-speaking communities pre-independence British Raj India ==
Numerous Luso-Indians and Luso-Goans were based in large cities of the Raj with the majority in Mumbai, and a smaller number in Karachi and other Indian cities. In the decades following the formation of Pakistan many Goan left for better economic opportunities in the West or the Persian Gulf countries.

Many Anglo-Indians resided at Karachi as well and often married Luso-Asians. The descendants are part of a minority community and are Pakistani citizens and cannot visit their ancestral family homes in Goa post the 1961 Indian annexation of Goa with ease.

== Luso-Indians, Luso-Goans outside the Republic of India ==
During Portuguese governance in parts of today's Republic of India, many Luso-Indian, Luso-Goan mestiços left the Indian subcontinent for other Portuguese territories and colonies for purposes of trade. Some also became Roman Catholic missionaries in Macau, Indonesia and Japan. One such mestiço was Gonsalo Garcia, a Catholic saint who was martyred in Japan in 1597. Other Luso-Indians went to Macau, then a Portuguese colony, where they intermarried into the local Macanese population. Goan mestiços are among the ancestors of many Macanese today. Before heading to Macau, Luso-Indians migrated to Malacca, Singapore, and Indonesia, where they intermarried with Malay and other native settlers, and descendants of Chinese settlers. Still other Luso-Indians went to Portuguese Mozambique. Known members of the Luso-Indian Mozambican community are Otelo Saraiva de Carvalho, a leader of the Carnation Revolution against the Estado Novo in Portugal, and Orlando da Costa, a writer who was born in Mozambique and lived until the age of 18 in Goa. He is the father of António Costa.

During the days of the British Empire, many Goans migrated to the British ruled regions in East Africa, such as Kenya and Uganda.

=== In Portugal ===
The mestiço children of wealthy Portuguese men were often sent to Portugal to study. Sometimes they remained there and established families. Many Portuguese-born mestiços became prominent politicians, lawyers, writers or celebrities. Alfredo Nobre da Costa, who was briefly Prime Minister of Portugal in 1978, was of partial Goan descent on his father's side. Similarly, António Costa, the Prime Minister of Portugal 2015-24, is one-quarter Goan through his father, Orlando da Costa. Television presenter Catarina Furtado is also part Indian.

Following the 1961 Indian annexation of Goa, many ethnic Portuguese living in Goa, as well as Goan assimilados and mestiços or Luso-Indians fled Goa for Portugal, Brazil or Portuguese Africa, others continued to live in Goa which is under the statehood of the Republic of India.

=== In the Caribbean ===
In the Caribbean, some Indo-Caribbean people intermixed with the Portuguese Trinidadians and Tobagonians, Portuguese Guyanese, Portuguese Surinamese, etc.

== Notable Luso-Indians and Luso-Goans ==
Significant Overlap with: List of people from Goa

- Kalidás Barreto - Português trade unionist; 1/2 Goan through his father Adeodato Barreto
- Menino Figueiredo, Goa’s 1st International Football Player
- Mariza-Portuguese Fado Singer
- Suella Braverman – Home Secretary
- Vincent Conçessao, Archbishop of Delhi
- Benjamin De Almeida - YouTuber
- Carlos Cordeiro, sports executive; his father is of Indo-Portuguese descent
- Rita Matias , MP of the Assembly of the Republic
- Antonio Costa, Former Prime Minister of Portugal
- Narana Coissoró, Former Vice President of the Assembly of the Republic
- Orlando António Fernandes da Costa (1929-2006) - Português writer; 1/2 Goan through his father
- António Maria de Bettencourt Rodrigues (1854-1933) - Português diplomat and doctor; 1/2 Goan through his father
- Henry Louis Vivian Derozio – Indian teacher and poet (born 1809)
- Juliana Dias da Costa – Harem-servant to the Mughal emperor of India Bahadur Shah I (born 1658)
- Blasius D'Souza
- Francisco D'Souza
- Cardinal Ivan Dias – Archbishop of Bombay
- Angelo Innocent Fernandes – Archbishop of Delhi
- Tony Fernandes – businessman
- Anthony Firingee – Bengali language folk poet (born 1786)
- Gonsalo Garcia – Roman Catholic saint (born 1556)
- John Gomes - Senior Vice President of Search, Google
- Cardinal Oswald Gracias – Archbishop of Bombay
- Cardinal Valerian Gracias – Archbishop of Bombay
- John Richard Lobo
- Michael Lobo
- Ivan Menezes – Chief Executive Officer of Diageo
- Manuel Menezes – Chairman of the Indian Railway Board
- Victor Menezes
- Casimiro Monteiro – PIDE agent who carried out the high-profile assassinations of Portuguese politicians, Humberto Delgado and Eduardo Mondlane (born 1920)
- Cardinal Simon Pimenta – Archbishop of Bombay
- Alfredo Jorge Nobre da Costa (1923-1996) - Prime Minister of Portugal from 28 August 1978 – 22 November 1978
- Marcos Perestrello (born 1971) - Minister of Defense of Portugal from 2009-2011, 2015-2018; part Goan through his great-great-grandfather
- V.J.P. Saldanha
- Maurice Salvador Sreshta
- João Rodrigo Reis Carvalho Leão (born 1974) - Português economist, Minister of Finance of Portugal from 2020-2022; 1/2 Goan through his father
- Fitz Remedios Santana de Souza
- Otelo Saraiva de Carvalho (1936-2021) - Português Army colonel and chief strategist of the Carnation Revolution; part Goan through his mother
- Keith Vaz – British Member of Parliament
- Valerie Vaz – British Member of Parliament and Shadow Leader of the House of Commons
- Ileana D'Cruz – Indian-born Portuguese actress
- Miguel Vicente de Abreu – historian
- Teotónio Rosário de Souza – historian
- José Camillo Lisboa – physician and botanist
- Miguel Caetano Dias- physician
- Archbishop Rev Dr Peter Bernard Pereira Bishop of Travancore (Trivandrum)
- Vivian Dsena - Indian Television Actor with christian father of Portuguese descent
- Nathalia Kaur - actress

== See also ==
- India–Portugal relations
- Portuguese India
- Indians in Portugal
- Korlai Fort
