= Daman and Diu Portuguese Creole =

Portuguese-based creole of western India

Daman and Diu Portuguese
- Língua da Casa
- Native to: India
- Region: Damaon, Diu & Silvassa, especially in the Damaon and Diu districts.
- Native speakers: 4,000 in Daman district and ca. 180 in Diu district (2010)
- Language family: Portuguese creole: Indo-Portuguese; Northern Indo-Portuguese; Daman and Diu Portuguese

Language codes
- ISO 639-3: –
- Glottolog: dama1278
- Linguasphere: 51-AAC-agb
- IETF: idb-u-sd-indh
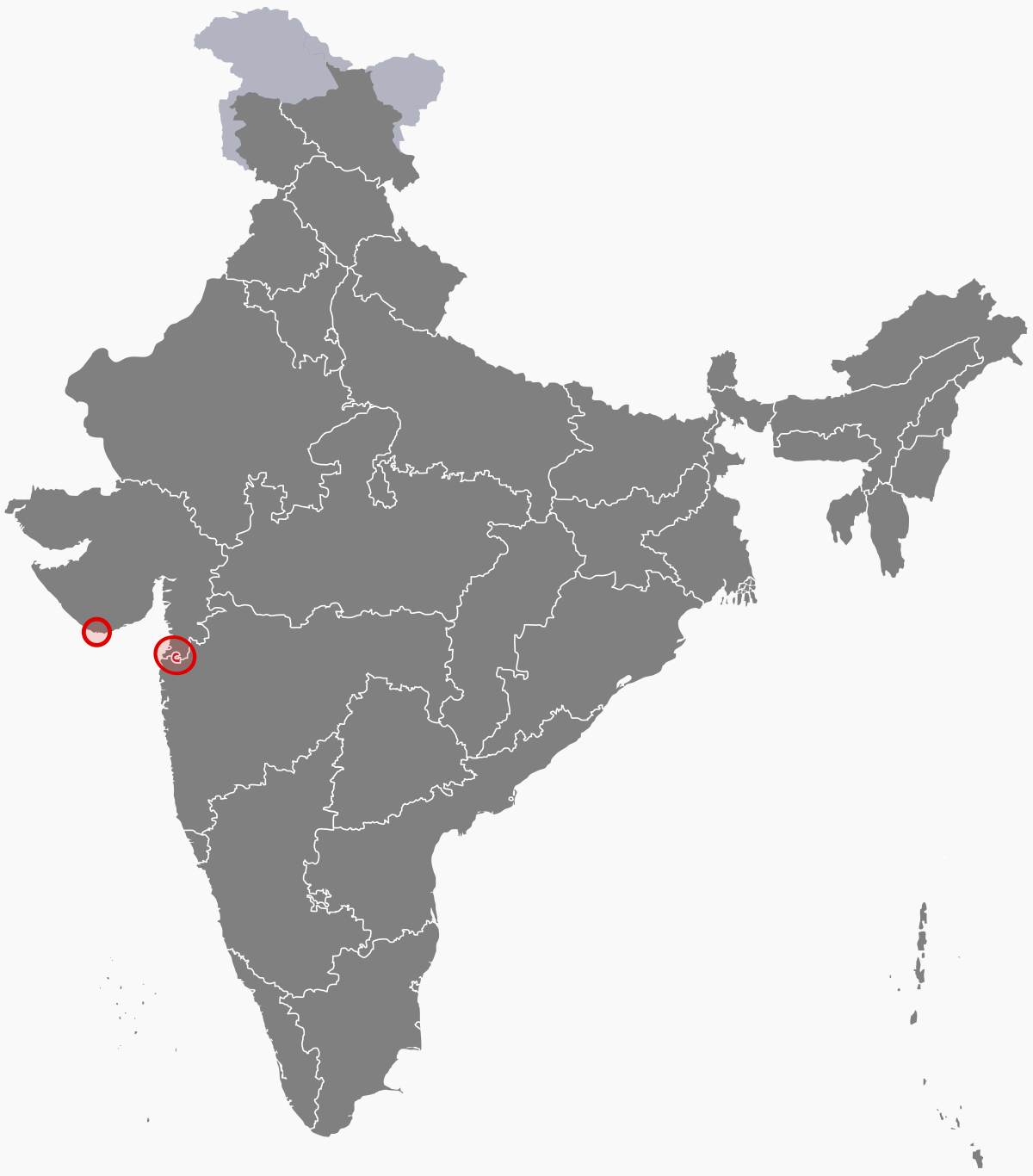
- Damao and Diu in the Indian Union.

The Daman and Diu Portuguese Creole, Portuguese: Língua Crioula de Damão e Dio & by its speakers as Língua da Casa meaning "home language"; refers to the variety of Indo-Portuguese creole spoken in the Dadra and Nagar Haveli and Daman and Diu (Damaon territory), in the northern Konkan region of India. Before the Indian annexation of the territory, the creole spoken by the Damanese natives underwent a profound decreolisation in the erstwhile Portuguese Goa and Damaon colony, a phenomenon whereby the Indo-Portuguese creole reconverged with European Portuguese.

== Daman Indo-Portuguese ==
The Daman creole is a descendant of the Norteiro creole, spoken originally by the Norteiros on the coast from Chaul, Vasai (Bassein), Bombay, to Damaon.

The superstrate language is Portuguese. The substrate of the Daman creole is likely to be Konkani. Gujarati has also been suggested as a possible substrate, but this is doubtful since the Gujarati people moved into the area only after the Portuguese arrived.

== Diu Indo-Portuguese ==
The Diu Indo-Portuguese or Diu Portuguese is spoken in Diu district, India. It is a creole language based mainly on Portuguese and Gujarati. It is a member of the larger family of Indo-Portuguese creoles, particularly close to the variety of Daman. There is a considerably vital oral tradition in this language, with songs regularly performed in Diu, elsewhere in India and among Indo-Portuguese communities abroad.

Widely spoken in the past, it was first documented in the 19th century by the initiative of Hugo Schuchardt. At present, the language is spoken natively by most of the local Catholics, numbering about 180, but is potentially endangered by the pressure of other languages such as Gujarati, English and standard Portuguese.

=== Social Demographics of Diu Indo-Portuguese Speakers ===
The Roman Catholic Christian community of Diu is the only one that speaks Diu-Indo Portuguese at home and in every day activities. This is also the only community that speaks the creole natively, and teaches it to its younger generation.

While some non-Christians claim to have working knowledge of the creole, Muslims and Hindus overwhelmingly speak Gujurati. They also speak Standard Portuguese due to regular emigration to Portugal for work or residential-related reasons. There are no class-based variations observed among speakers of Diu Indo-Portuguese, due to the small size of the speech community.

While speakers of Diu Indo-Portuguese are relatively economically affluent compared to the entire population, this affluence cannot be attributed to the use of the language. Rather, there is a stronger case of the link between economic affluence and speaking Standard Portuguese. Diu Indo-Portuguese speakers are also often fluent in Standard Portuguese as well, which explains their improved economic situation.

=== Diu Indo-Portuguese Language Prestige ===
During Portuguese rule, Standard European Portuguese was considered more prestigious than Diu Indo-Creole. This was due to Standard Portuguese being the language of education, emigrants, Church authorities, and the ruling elites.

This historical asymmetry has carried over into recent times. Diu Indo-Portuguese speakers prefer switching to Standard European Portuguese when they sense power asymmetries e.g. when speaking to perceived foreigners. Many who cannot switch as easily prefer conversing in English instead. This preference to not converse in the language, as well as the fact that a lot of speakers describe Diu Indo-Portuguese as "broken Portuguese", points to the low prestige associated with the language.

However, there is still prestige associated with Diu Indo-Portuguese relative to other Indo-Portuguese languages. Many native speakers display pride in the fact that their language is closer to the European strain of Standard Portuguese.

=== Reasons for Current Endangerment of Diu Indo-Portuguese ===
The greatest challenge to the language's stability and vitality is the extremely small size of its speaker population. At approximately 170 speakers, in 2006, Diu Indo-Portuguese is very susceptible to elimination via large immigration influxes.

A large reason for the language's prevalence in the house life of Diuese was the institutional use of Standard Portuguese at work. However, there is only one institution that carries out its services in Standard Portuguese anymore: The Catholic Church. Furthermore, even the Church is beginning to adopt English as its official language of instruction, in line with the rest of the region.

Considered a relic of the colonial age, Standard Portuguese has faced pressure from groups advocating for decolonization. These sentiments are also echoed by the younger generations of Diu, who prefer to converse in Gujarati, English, or even Hindi. Such pressures on Standard Portuguese will likely carry over to Diu Indo-Portuguese as well. This would mean that the language is considered an undesirable by-product of Portuguese colonialism.

== Number of speakers ==
The Portuguese heritage in Daman is more common and lively than in Goa and this helped to keep the language alive. The language is spoken by an estimated number of 2,000 Damanese.

Besides the lingua da casa, Gujarati, Portuguese & Konkani are also found in the territory.

=== Number of Speakers of Diu Indo-Portuguese ===
The last official survey carried out in the region indiscriminately included both Diuese and Damanese people under the category of Christian. Therefore, testimonies from parish priests in Diu serve as better sources of population numbers. According to these testimonies, dated to 2006, there were 250 Christians in Diu. Of these, only 200 were native-born. Allowing for a small margin of natives who were not aware of Diu Indo-Portuguese for one reason or another, it is estimated that the language had 170 speakers in 2006.

According to the most recent 2011 National Survey in India, only 202 people in India identify as Christian. Accounting for further non-native Christian immigration suggests that the Diu Indo-Portuguese speaking population is likely on the decline since 2006.

== See also ==
- Kristi language
- Portuguese in Goa and Bombay
