= Portuguese-based creole languages =

Creole languages lexified by Portuguese

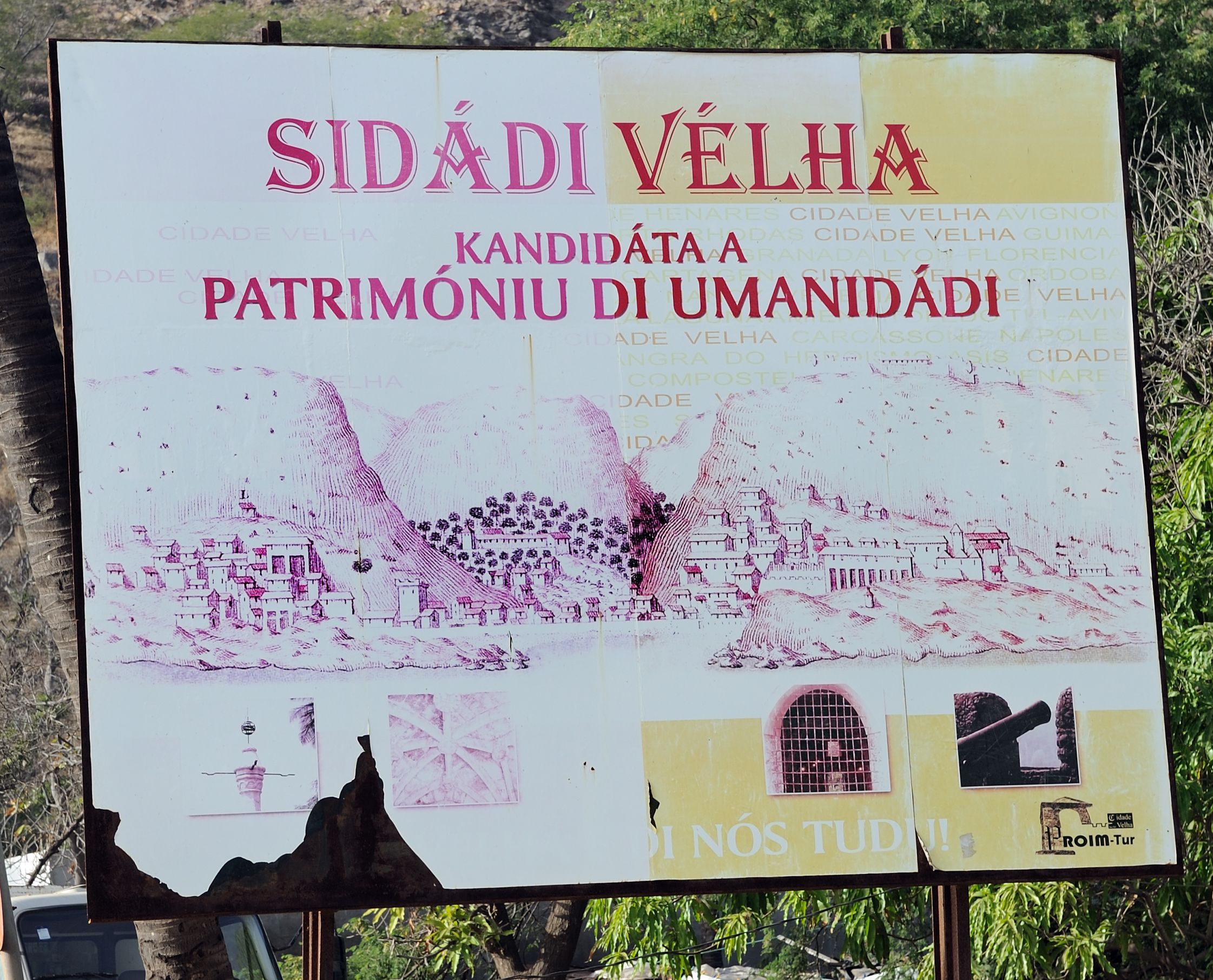
Cape Verdean Creole used in a panel for Cidade Velha, Cape Verde

Portuguese creoles are creole languages whose lexical base is mainly derived from Portuguese. The oldest of them, Cape Verdean Creole, appeared at the end of the 15th century, while the more recent ones, such as Malacca Creole or Diu Creole, developed in the 17th and 18th centuries in the former Asian trading posts of the Portuguese empire.

== Origins ==
Portuguese overseas exploration in the 15th and 16th centuries led to the establishment of a Portuguese Empire with trading posts, forts and colonies in Africa, Asia and the Americas. Contact between the Portuguese language and native languages gave rise to many Portuguese-based pidgins, used as linguas francas throughout the Portuguese sphere of influence. In time, many of these pidgins were nativized, becoming new stable creole languages.

As is the rule in most creoles, the lexicon of these languages can be traced to the parent languages, usually with predominance of Portuguese; while the grammar is mostly original and unique to each creole with little resemblance to the syntax of Portuguese or the substrate language.

These creoles are (or were) spoken mostly by communities of descendants of Portuguese, natives, and sometimes other peoples from the Portuguese colonial empire.

Until recently creoles were considered "degenerate" dialects of Portuguese unworthy of attention. As a consequence, there is little documentation on the details of their formation. Since the 20th century, increased study of creoles by linguists led to several theories being advanced. The monogenetic theory of pidgins assumes that some type of pidgin language — dubbed West African Pidgin Portuguese — based on Portuguese was spoken from the 15th to 18th centuries in the forts established by the Portuguese on the West African coast. According to this theory, this variety may have been the starting point of all the pidgin and creole languages. This may explain to some extent why Portuguese lexical items can be found in many creoles, but more importantly, it would account for the numerous grammatical similarities shared by such languages, such as the preposition na, meaning "in" and/or "on", which would come from the Portuguese contraction na, meaning "in the" (feminine singular).

=== Origin of the name ===
The Portuguese word for "creole" is crioulo, which derives from the verb criar ("to raise", "to bring up") and a suffix -oulo of debated origin. Originally the word was used to distinguish the members of any ethnic group who were born and raised in the colonies from those who were born in their homeland. In Africa it was often applied to locally born people of (wholly or partly) Portuguese descent, as opposed to those born in Portugal; whereas in Brazil it was also used to distinguish locally born black people of African descent from those who had been brought from Africa as slaves.

In time, however, this generic sense was lost, and the word crioulo or its derivatives (like "Creole" and its equivalents in other languages) became the name of several specific Upper Guinean communities and their languages: the Guinean people and their Kriol language, Cape Verdean people and their Kriolu language, all of which still today have very vigorous use, suppressing the importance of official standard Portuguese.

== Concise list ==
- Saramaccan: An English-Portuguese creole spoken in Suriname and French Guyana
- Macanese: Previously spoken in Macau

=== Upper Guinea ===
- Cape Verdean Creole: Vigorous use, Cape Verde Islands.
- Guinea-Bissau Creole: Vigorous use. Lingua franca in Guinea-Bissau, also spoken in Casamance, Senegal. Growing number of speakers.
- Papiamento: Official language in Aruba, Bonaire and Curaçao. Although situated in the Caribbean, it belongs to this language family. It has a growing number of speakers.

=== Lower Guinea ===
- Angolar: A heavy substrate of Kimbundu, spoken on São Tomé Island, São Tomé and Príncipe.
- Annobonese: Vigorous use. Spoken on Annobón island, Equatorial Guinea
- Forro: Forro is becoming the language of social networks. Spoken on São Tomé Island, São Tomé and Príncipe.
- Principense: Almost extinct. Spoken on Príncipe Island, São Tomé and Príncipe.

=== Indo-Portuguese ===
- Malabar–Sri Lankan Portuguese, grouping Sri Lankan Portuguese, Battilocan Portuguese, Malabar Indo-Portuguese. Spoken in the coastal cities of Sri Lanka and Malabar, India.
- Daman and Diu Portuguese Creole, spoken in Dadra and Nagar Haveli and Daman and Diu, India. (old decreolization)
- Korlai Portuguese Creole, spoken in Korlai, India.

=== Malayo-Portuguese ===
- Kristang: spoken in Malaysia and emigrant communities in Singapore and Perth, Western Australia.
- Mardijker Creole: Extinct, formerly spoken by Mardijker people in the Kampung Tugu area of Jakarta.
- Portugis: Extinct, formerly spoken by Luso-Asian Moluccans on Ambon and Ternate in the Maluku Islands.
- Português de Bidau: Extinct, formerly spoken in Bidau, a suburb of Dili, East Timor.

== Africa ==
=== Upper Guinea ===
The oldest Portuguese creole are the so-called crioulos of Upper Guinea, born around the Portuguese settlements along the northwest coast of Africa. Portuguese creoles are the mother tongues of most people in Cape Verde and the ABC Islands. In Guinea-Bissau, the creole is used as lingua franca among people speaking different languages, and is becoming the mother tongue of a growing population. They consist of two languages:

- Guinea-Bissau Creole (Kriol): lingua franca of Guinea-Bissau, also spoken in Casamance, Senegal and in Gambia.
  - Casamance Creole (Kriyol): a dialect of Guinea-Bissau creole, spoken mainly in Casamance, Senegal and The Gambia.
- Cape Verdean Creole (Kriolu, Kriol): a dialect continuum on the islands of Cape Verde.
- Papiamento (Papiamentu), spoken in Aruba, Bonaire, and Curaçao.
- Guene, an extinct creole spoken by Afro-Curaçaoans and Afro-Bonaireans.

=== Gulf of Guinea ===
Another group of creoles is spoken in the Gulf of Guinea, in São Tomé and Príncipe and Equatorial Guinea.

- Angolar (Ngola, N'góla): in coastal areas of São Tomé Island.
- Annobonese (Fa d'Ambu): on Annobón Island.
- Forro: in São Tomé.
- Principense (Lunguyê) (almost extinct): on Príncipe Island.
- Tongas Portuguese (Português dos Tongas): variety of Cape Verdean Creole spoken in São Tomé and Príncipe.

Many other Portuguese creoles probably existed in the former Portuguese feitorias in the Gulf of Guinea, but also in the Congo region.

=== Portuguese pidgins ===
Portuguese pidgins still exist in Angola and Mozambique.

== South Asia ==
=== India ===
Locations where creole languages influenced by Portuguese developed

The numerous Portuguese outposts in India and Sri Lanka gave rise to many Portuguese creole languages, of which only a few have survived to the present. The largest group were the Norteiro languages, spoken by the Norteiro people, the Christian Indo-Portuguese in the North Konkan. Those communities were centered on Baçaim, modern Vasai, which was then called the "Northern Court of Portuguese India" (in opposition to the "Southern Court" at Goa). The creole languages spoken in Baçaim, Salsete, Thana, Chevai, Mahim, Tecelaria, Dadar, Parel, Cavel, Bandora (modern Bandra), Gorai, Morol, Andheri, Versova, Malvan, Manori, Mazagão, and Chaul are now extinct. The only surviving Norteiro creoles are:

- Daman and Diu Portuguese Creole: in Dadra and Nagar Haveli and Daman and Diu. Spoken by about 4,000 people in Daman and 180 in Diu.
- Kristi: in Korlai, Maharashtra. Spoken by about 800 people in 2015.

These surviving Norteiro creoles have suffered drastic changes in the last decades. Standard Portuguese re-influenced the creole of Daman in the mid-20th century.

The creoles of the Coast of Coromandel, such as of Meliapor, Madras, Tuticorin, Cuddalore, Karikal, Pondicherry, Tranquebar, Manapar, and Negapatam, were already extinct by the 19th century. Their speakers (mostly the people of mixed Portuguese-Indian ancestry, known locally as Topasses) switched to English after the British takeover.

Most of the creoles of the Coast of Malabar, namely those of Cananor, Tellicherry, Mahé, Cochin (modern Kerala), and Quilon) had become extinct by the 19th century. In Cananor and Tellicherry, some elderly people still spoke some creole in the 1980s. The only creole that is still spoken (by a few Christian families only) is Vypin Indo-Portuguese, in the Vypin Island, near Kerala; the last native speaker of the language, William Rozario, died in 2010, but the language is still spoken and understood to some degree by the Luso-Asian community of Kochi.

Christians, even in Calcutta, used Portuguese until 1811. A Portuguese creole was still spoken in the early 20th century. Portuguese creoles were spoken in Bengal, such as at Balasore, Pipli, Chandannagore, Chittagong, Midnapore and Hooghly.

=== Sri Lanka ===
Significant Portuguese creoles flourished among the so-called Burgher and Kaffir communities of Sri Lanka:

- Sri Lanka Indo-Portuguese: around Batticaloa and Trincomalee (Portuguese Burghers) and Puttalam (Kaffirs). Spoken by about 2,220 people in 2011. Primarily derived from Sinhala and Portuguese with influence and some vocabulary from Tamil and Dutch.
- Sri Lanka Kaffir Portuguese: a creole spoken by the Sri Lankan Kaffir community. The Kaffirs are descendants of soldiers and slaves from the African Great Lakes region, as well as Portuguese colonists and native Sinhalese and Tamils. The language reportedly differed from the main Sri Lanka Indo-Portuguese Creole spoken in Sri Lanka, and likely had influences from Bantu languages, although there are no records of the language, and the Kaffir community switched to Sri Lanka Indo-Portuguese.

=== Bangladesh ===
Bengali Portuguese Creole was spoken by Luso-Asians and Roman Catholics in Bangladesh until its extinction in the late 19th to early 20th century. Bangladeshi Luso-Asians who spoke Bengali Portuguese Creole were concentrated in Chittagong, in the old Portuguese settlement of Firingi Bazar, formerly the capital of the Portuguese Empire in Bengal. A smaller but still significant population of Bengali Portuguese Creole speakers was located in the smaller Firingi Bazar of Dhaka; the word Firingi is derived from the Persian word farang meaning foreigner.

In the past, Portuguese creoles were also spoken in Myanmar and Bangladesh.

== Southeast & East Asia ==
Locations where creole languages influenced by Portuguese developed

The earliest Portuguese creole in the region probably arose in the 16th century in Malacca, Malaysia, as well as in the Moluccas. After the takeover of those places by the Dutch in the 17th century, many creole-speaking slaves were taken to other places in Indonesia and South Africa, leading to several creoles that survived until recent times.

=== Malaysia, Indonesia, Singapore and Timor-Leste ===
- Kristang (Cristão): in Malacca (Malaysia) and Singapore, with a further diaspora community in Perth, Western Australia descended from both communities arising in more modern times. Derived primarily from Portuguese and Malay with some vocabulary from Tamil, Cantonese, Dutch, and Hokkien.
- Mardijker (extinct in 2012): by the Mardijker people of Batavia (Jakarta)
  - Papiá Tugu (extinct in 1978): in Kampung Tugu, Jakarta, Indonesia.
- Portugis (extinct around 1950): in the Ambon, Ternate islands and Minahasa, Indonesia
- Bidau Portuguese (extinct in the 1960s): in the Bidau area of Dili, East Timor.
- Flores Portuguese (possibly extinct in the late 20th century): in the Larantuka and Maumere of Flores, Indonesia.

Portuguese was present on the island of Flores, Indonesia since the 16th century, especially in Larantuka and Maumere; it probably became extinct in the late 20th century, its traces in the local Malay-based creole language, if any, do not survive (see Larantuka Malay and Maumere Malay).

=== Thailand and Myanmar ===
Portuguese creoles were spoken in the Bangkok neighborhoods of Kudi Chin and Conception, which were former Portuguese colonies settled by Luso-Asians, and in the Sagaing Region of Myanmar.

Thai Portuguese Creole was spoken by Luso-Asians in the Bangkok neighborhoods of Kudi Chin and Conception, which were former Portuguese colonies settled by Luso-Asians. The Luso-Thai communities of Kudi Chin and Conception still exist, numbering around 2,000, but the language has not been recorded for centuries.

In Myanmar, Burmese Portuguese Creole was spoken by the Bayingyi people, a Luso-Asian group descended from Portuguese mercenaries and adventurers to Burma in the 16th and 17th centuries who were enlisted into the Burmese army and settled there. The Bayingyi community still exists, but the language has not been recorded or spoken for centuries.

=== Macau ===
The Portuguese language was present in Portugal's colony Macau since the mid-16th century. A Portuguese creole, Macanese Patuá, developed there. Macanese is primarily derived from Cantonese and Portuguese, with influence and vocabulary from Malay and Sinhala. It is nearly extinct in Macau, being spoken by an estimated 50 people in 2007, but more Macanese speakers likely exist among the diaspora.

== South America ==
A few Portuguese creoles are found in South America:

- Saramaccan of Suriname.
- Cupópia of Brazil is nearly extinct.

There is no consensus regarding the position of Saramaccan, with some scholars classifying it as Portuguese creole with an English relexification. Saramaccan may be an English creole with Portuguese words, since structurally (morphology and syntax) it is related to the Surinamese creoles (Sranan, Ndyuka and Jamaican Maroon), despite the heavy percentage of Portuguese origin words. Other English creole languages of Suriname, such as Paramaccan or Kwinti, have also Portuguese influences.

Although sometimes classified as a creole, the Cupópia language from the Quilombo do Cafundó, at Salto de Pirapora, São Paulo, discovered in 1978 and spoken by less than 40 people as a secret language, is better classified as a Portuguese variety since it is structurally similar to Portuguese, in spite of having a large number of Bantu words in its lexicon. For languages with these characteristics, H. H. do Couto has forged the designation of anticreole, which would be the inverse of a creole language, as they are seen by the non-European input theories (i.e.: creoles = African languages grammar + European languages lexicon; anticreoles = European languages grammar + African languages lexicon).

There is a Portuguese dialect in Helvécia, South of Bahia that is theorized as presenting signs of an earlier decreolization. Ancient Portuguese creoles originating from Africa are still preserved in the ritual songs of the Afro-Brazilian animist religions (Candomblé).

=== Brazil ===
It has been conjectured that the vernacular of Brazil (not the official and standard Brazilian Portuguese) resulted from decreolization of a creole based on Portuguese and native languages; but this is not a widely accepted view. Vernacular Brazilian Portuguese is continuous and mutually intelligible with European Portuguese, and in fact quite conservative in some aspects. Academic specialists compiled by linguist Volker Noll affirm that the Brazilian linguistic phenomena are the "nativização", nativization/nativism of a most radically Romanic form. The phenomena in Brazilian Portuguese are Classical Latin and Old Portuguese heritage. This is not a creole form, but a radical Romanic form. Regardless of borrowings and minor changes, it must be kept in mind that Brazilian Portuguese is not a Portuguese creole, since both grammar and vocabulary remain "real" Portuguese and its origins can be traced directly from 16th century European Portuguese. Some authors, like Swedish Parkvall, classify it as a semicreole in the concept defined by Holm: a semicreole is a language that has undergone "partial restructuring, producing varieties which were never fully pidginized and which preserve a substantial part of their lexifier's structure (...) while showing a noticeable degree of restructuring". Nevertheless, scholars like Anthony Julius Naro and Maria Marta Pereira Scherre demonstrated how every single phenomenon found in Brazilian Portuguese can also be found in regional modern European Portuguese and 1500s and 1600s European Portuguese, such as the epic poetry of Luís de Camões, as well as other Romance languages such as Aranese Occitan, French, Italian and Romanian, classifying these phenomena as a natural Romance drift. Vernacular Brazilian Portuguese is continuous with European Portuguese and its phonetics is more conservative in several aspects, characterizing the nativization of a koiné formed by several regional European Portuguese variations brought to Brazil and its natural drift.

== The Caribbean ==
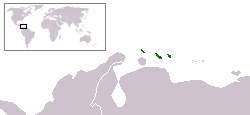
Location map of Aruba, Bonaire and Curaçao, where Papiamento is spoken

Papiamento, spoken on Aruba, Bonaire, and Curaçao, is closely related to the Upper Guinea Creoles: Guinea-Bissau Creole, and especially with Cape Verdean Creole. Papiamento has a Portuguese basis, but has undergone a large Spanish and considerable Dutch influence. In addition to the theory of an origin in Portuguese creole, few scholars have explained the Portuguese strata as originating in Judeo-Portuguese from the Netherlands, immigration from Dutch Brazil or the poorly attested Guene language.

Guene or Gueni is the name used to refer to a Portuguese-based creole language or languages spoken in Curaçao and Bonaire by enslaved afro-curaçaoans and their descendants. By the time it was first studied in the 20th century, Guene was extinct. However, traditional songs in Guene have survived into the modern era, and were recorded by linguists and folklorists from the 1950s onwards.

== North America ==
Traces of a Portuguese-based pidgin have also been detected among the enslaved population in New Netherland and Manhattan.

== See also ==
- Sri Lankan Portuguese creole
- Sabir (language)
