= Korlai Fort =

Fort in Maharashtra, India

- Morro de Chaul
- Part of Portuguese India
- Raigad district, Maharashtra
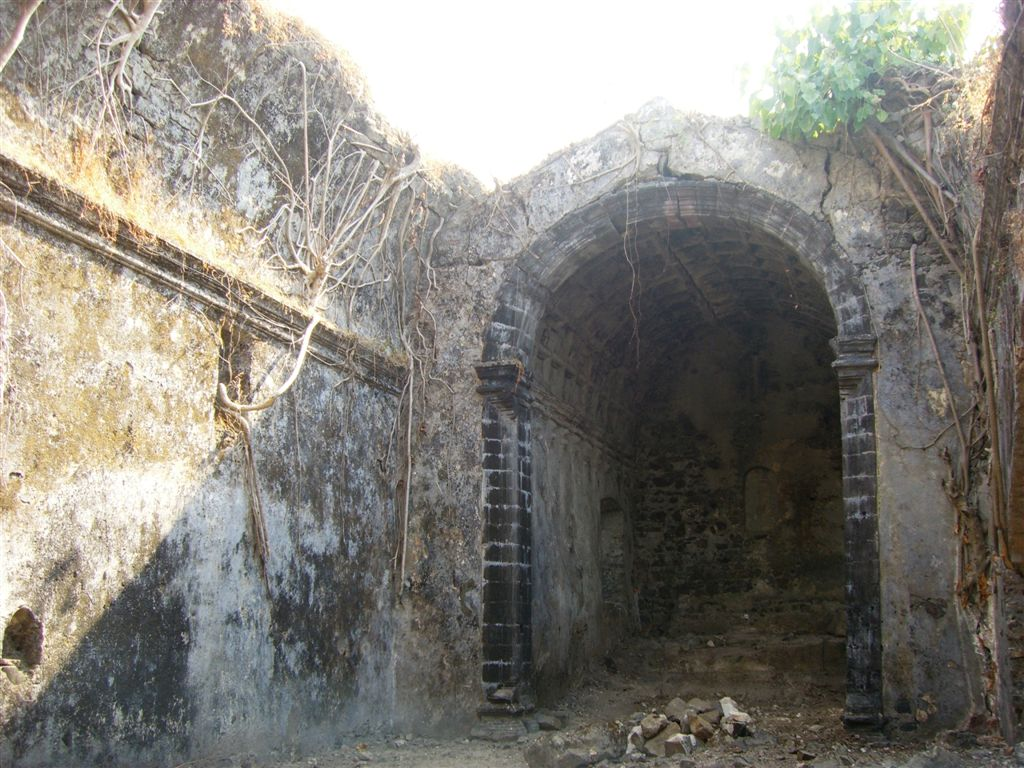
- Ruins of the Portuguese church in Korlai

Site information
- Type: Island fort
- Owner: Government of India
- Controlled by: Ahmadnagar (1521-1594); Portugal (1594-1739); Maratha Empire (1739-1818); United Kingdom: East India Company (1818-1857); British Raj (1857-1947); India (1947-)
- Open to the public: Yes
- Condition: Ruins

Location
- Location Of Korlai fort
- Location within Maharashtra Location within India
- Coordinates: 18°32′9″N 72°54′29″E

Site history
- Built: 1521
- Built by: Dom Filipe Mascarenhas
- Materials: Stone
- Demolished: 1594

Korlai Fort is a colonial fort in the Raigad district of Maharashtra, India. Formerly a part of Chaul in Portuguese India, the structure is a specimen of Portuguese colonial architecture. It was built as a companion to the fort at Chaul, at this strategic position the Portuguese could use it to defend their province which stretched from Korlai to the Fort Bassein. Vestiges of the Portuguese occupation are manifested in the distinct dialect of the Korlai villages inhabitants which is a Luso-Indian creole called Korlai Portuguese Creole.

== History ==
This fort was built in 1521 by the Portuguese with the permission of the Ahmednagar sultanate. In 1521, taking advantage of the confusion in the aftermath of the death of the Burhan Nizam, the Portuguese tried to take over the fort. However the sultan retaliated and sent some of his best men to reclaim the fort. Subsequently, a truce was reached in which the Ahmednagar sultanate occupied the island and no further fortification of the island took place. Only a wooden cross remained on the island as a sign of its former rulers.

However, in 1594, Abranches, a Portuguese captain with 1,500 soldiers and 1,500 natives took possession of the fort. The besieged soldiers of the Sultanate tried to block their way by putting a dead elephant at the main gate and a dead horse at the inner gate. But in the end they had to surrender. The Portuguese won the fort but not having enough men to stand guard there chose to destroy it leaving only the central tower and a battery intact.

Before its destruction, Korlai had been described by travelers as a "magnificent fortress as strong as any other in the world". On the inland side - the only place where it was susceptible to be attacked - it was protected by a ditch and could only be accessed by a drawbridge. The main entrance was guarded by a bronze lion and the highest tower by a bronze eagle. It housed 7,000 horses and as much men.

Some parts of it were rebuilt later but now had a garrison of only 50 men. The church within the fort was used for worship on Sundays and holidays. Korlai fort was also strategically very important as it guarded the mouth of the bay. Chhatrapati Sambhaji Maharaj, the son of Chhatrapati Shivaji Maharaj, tried to take it over but failed and had to withdraw his forces on 6 December 1687.. Following the Maratha siege of 1739, Portugal ceded Chaul and Morro de Chaul by the Treaty of Poona dated 18 September 1740; the forts were delivered shortly afterwards. The fort was taken by the Marathas who held it from 1739 to 1818.

== Last Commandant ==
The last commandant of the fort, belong to Vanjari, who died a few years ago, must, like his predecessor, have wrought this nationalization of Portuguese names.”

== Major features ==
The fort is 2,828 feet long, and its average breadth is eighty-nine feet. The enclosing wall is 5' 3" high and has 305 battlements for guns. It is entered by eleven gates - four are outer and seven are inner. At the north point, within pistol-shot of the main battery, is the water cistern named Santa Cruz, major source of water. The area within the fort walls is divided into three enclosures by two lines of bastioned fortifications. Each of the seven bastions bears the name of a saint. The two westward bastions are named São Diego (after Didacus of Alcalá) and São Francisco (after Francis of Assisi). The others are São Pedro, São Inácio, and São Filipe.

The top of the hill is bastioned as well and is surrounded by a parapet. It has a large rainwater cistern with three mouths, each one foot wide, and the ruins of the magazine and a church. The church was built in 1630 for the use of the army and was functional until 1728.

There are three Portuguese inscriptions. One, over a doorway in the centre and highest part of the fort (see picture), reads as follows:

This castle was commanded to be built by the Viceroy of India Dom Filipe Mascarenhas in November of the year 1646 and Fernão Miranda Henriques being Captain of Chaul, and was finished in May 1680, Cristóvão de Abreu de Azevedo being Captain of this fort.

The inscription is surmounted by a cross with a coat of arms having the Portuguese stars in the centre and surrounded by seven castles. Other inscriptions over the main entrance and over an altar in the chapel are worn out and undecipherable. During the brief Maratha rule, some of the names of the bastions were changed but now the only indication of their presence is some dismantled shrines.

== Forest ==
The hill slopes surrounding the fort are in control of the Maharashtra Forest department. Originally trees of teak were planted on the eastern slopes. Later, in 1996, plantation of Casuarina, cashew and Acacia auriculiformis was done to check erosion.

== Gallery ==
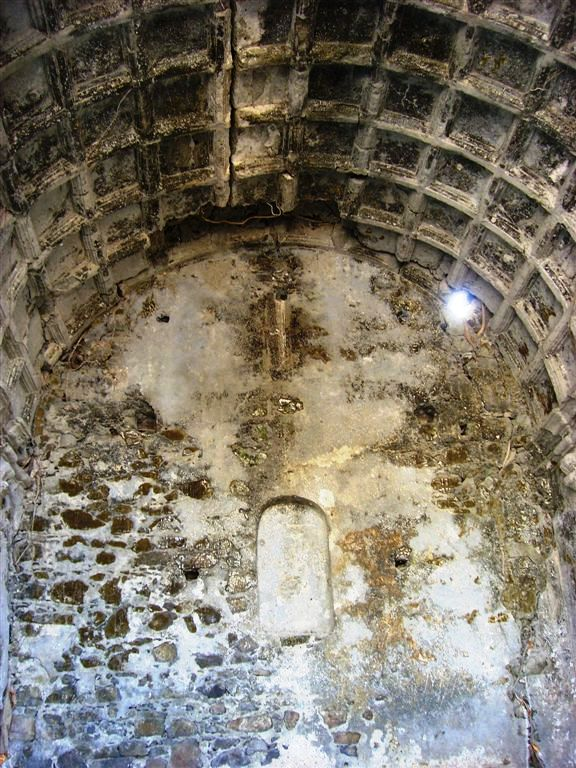
Main hall ruins

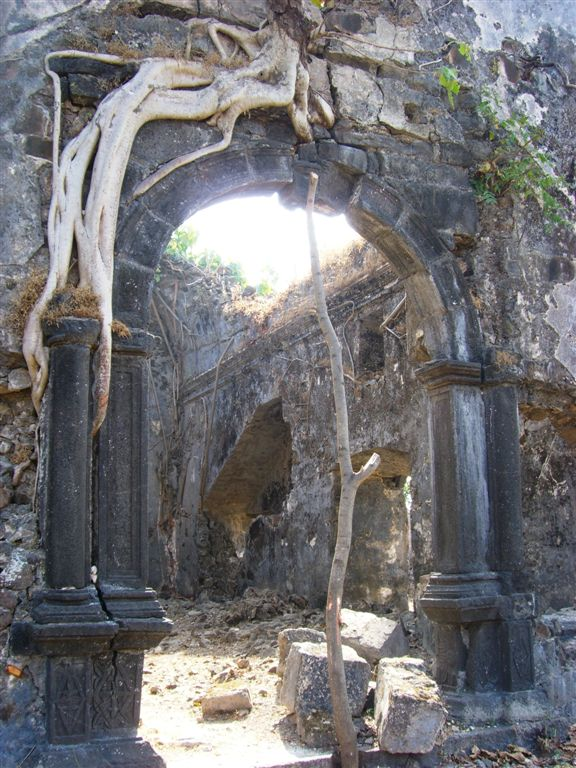
Entrance

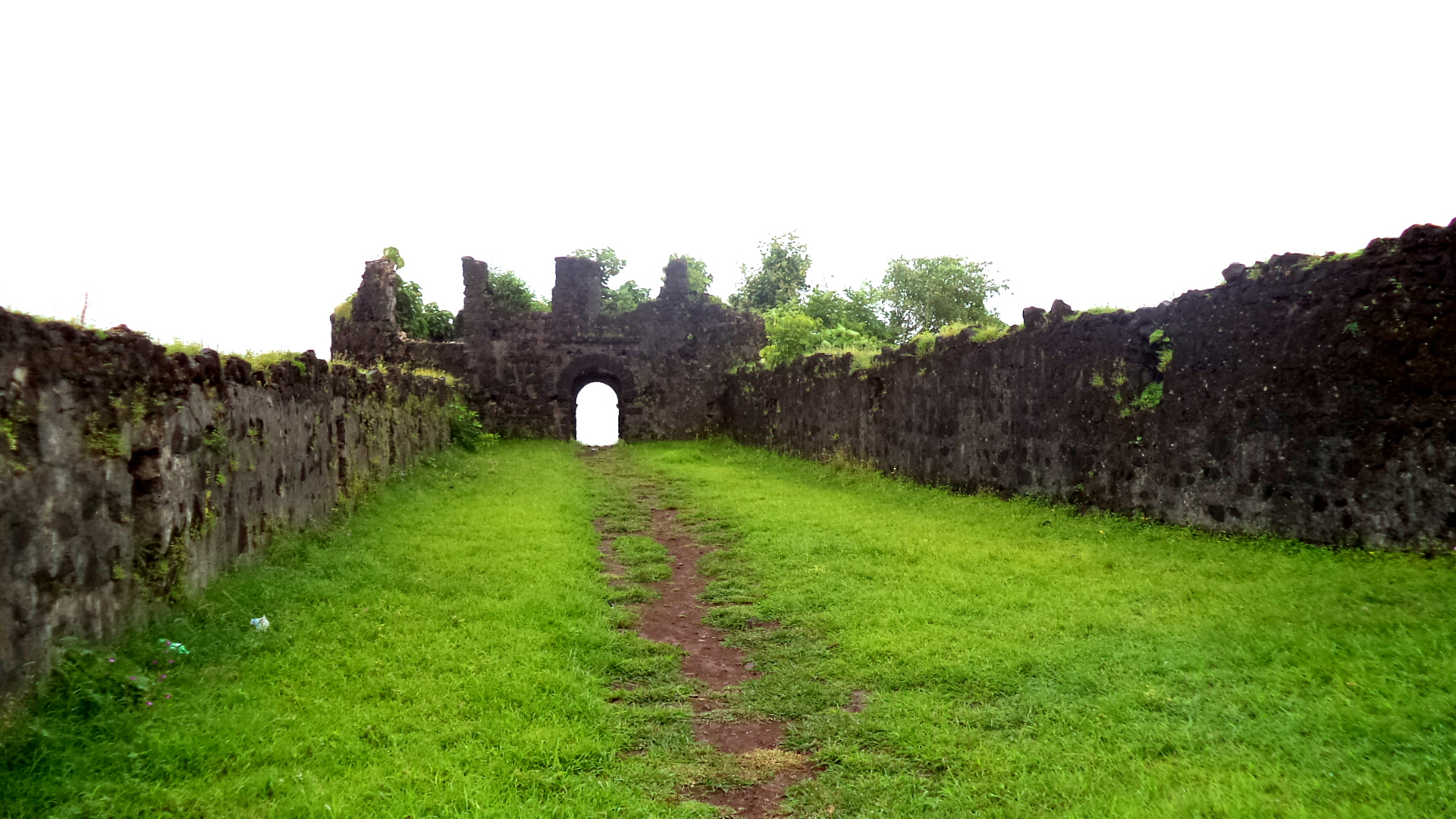
Walkway

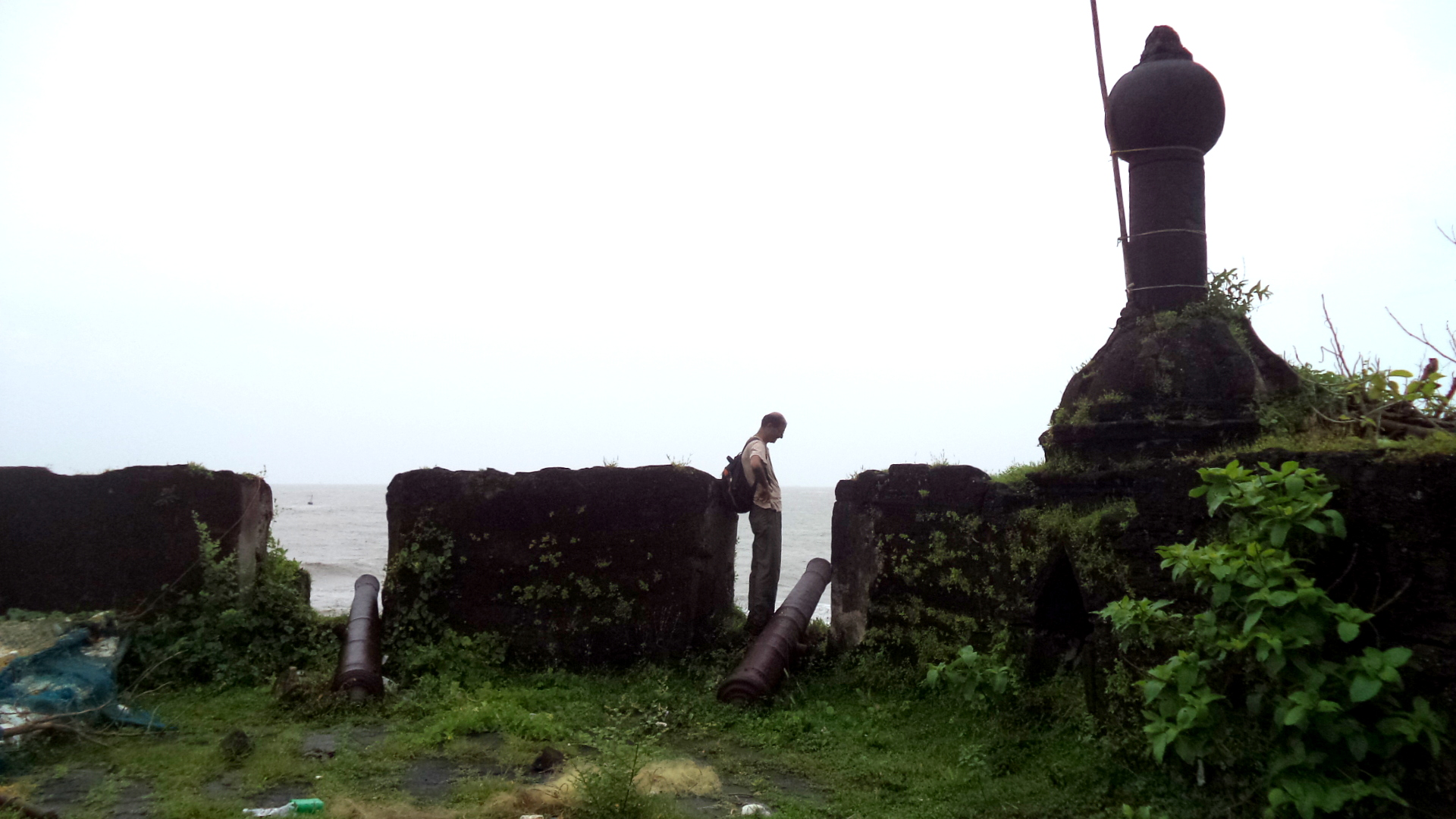
The Cross bateri

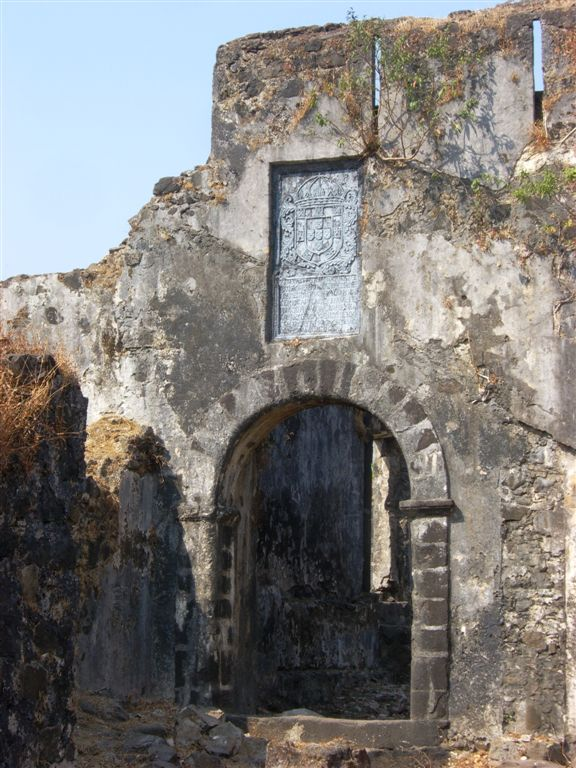
Inscription on top of the main entrance

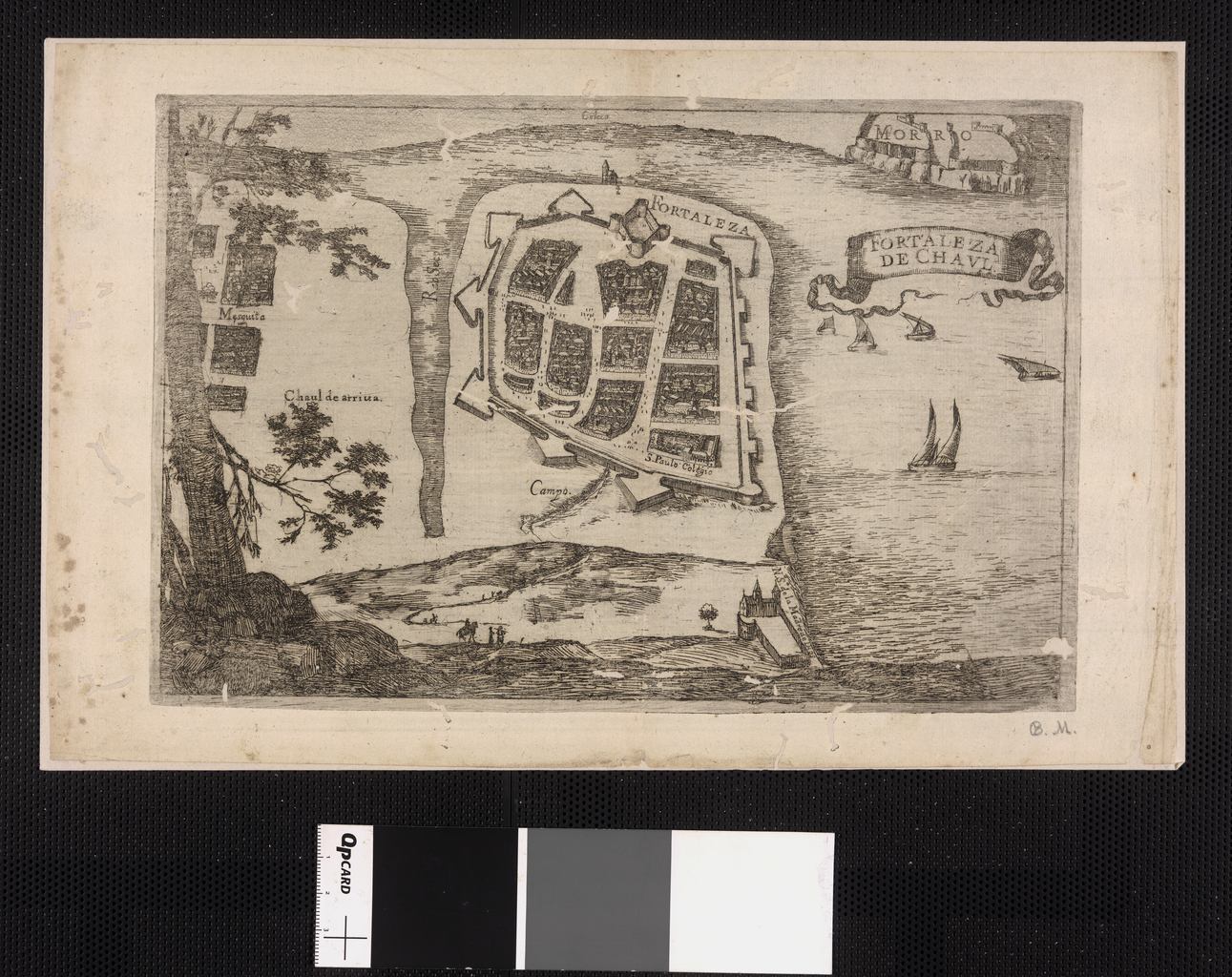
Map of Chaul and environs

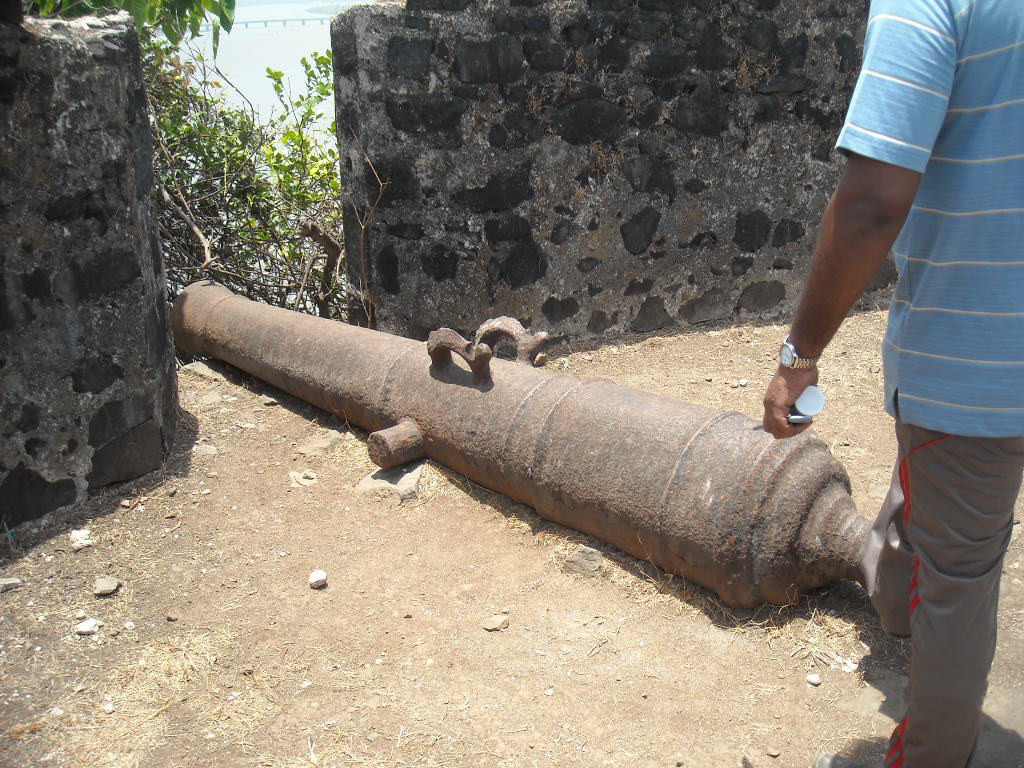
A canon

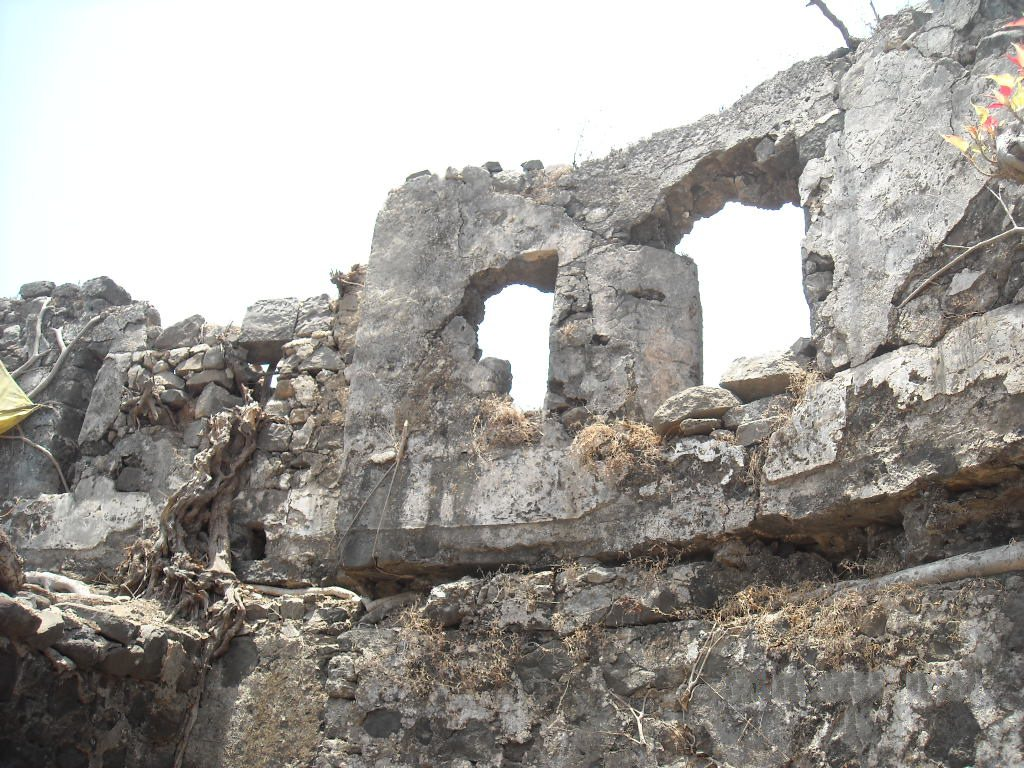
Section

== See also ==
- List of forts in Maharashtra
