= Korlai Portuguese Creole =

Indo-Portuguese creole language

Korlai Portuguese creole
- Kristi
- Nou Ling
- Native to: India
- Native speakers: 800 (2015)
- Language family: Portuguese Creole: Indo-Portuguese; Northern Indo-Portuguese; Korlai Portuguese creole

Language codes
- ISO 639-3: vkp
- Glottolog: korl1238
- Linguasphere: 51-AAC-agc
- Location within Maharashtra Location within India
- Coordinates: 18.5232°N 72.9195°E

Korlai Portuguese is an Indo-Portuguese creole based on the Portuguese language, spoken by approximately 1,000 Luso-Indian inhabitants of the Korlai (Corlaim) village at the Korlai fort, a former possession of the Portuguese in Goa and Bombay. Their speech is referred to as Korlai creole, Korlai Portuguese, Kristi or Nɔw-ling by the speakers themselves, which translates to "our language" in the creole. The speakers are a part of a very close-knit community, and refer to themselves as the Kristi community bound by their affiliation to the Christian denomination, of Roman Catholicism in India. Korlai is situated in the Raigad district (Colaba district) of the Konkan division named after the Colaba fort, 150 kilometers south of Mumbai (Bombay), in Maharashtra, India. The speakers are of a homogenous Roman Catholic pocket in an area otherwise dominated by Konkani Muslim and Hindu Marathi-Konkani speaking inhabitants.

== Development of Korlai Creole Portuguese ==
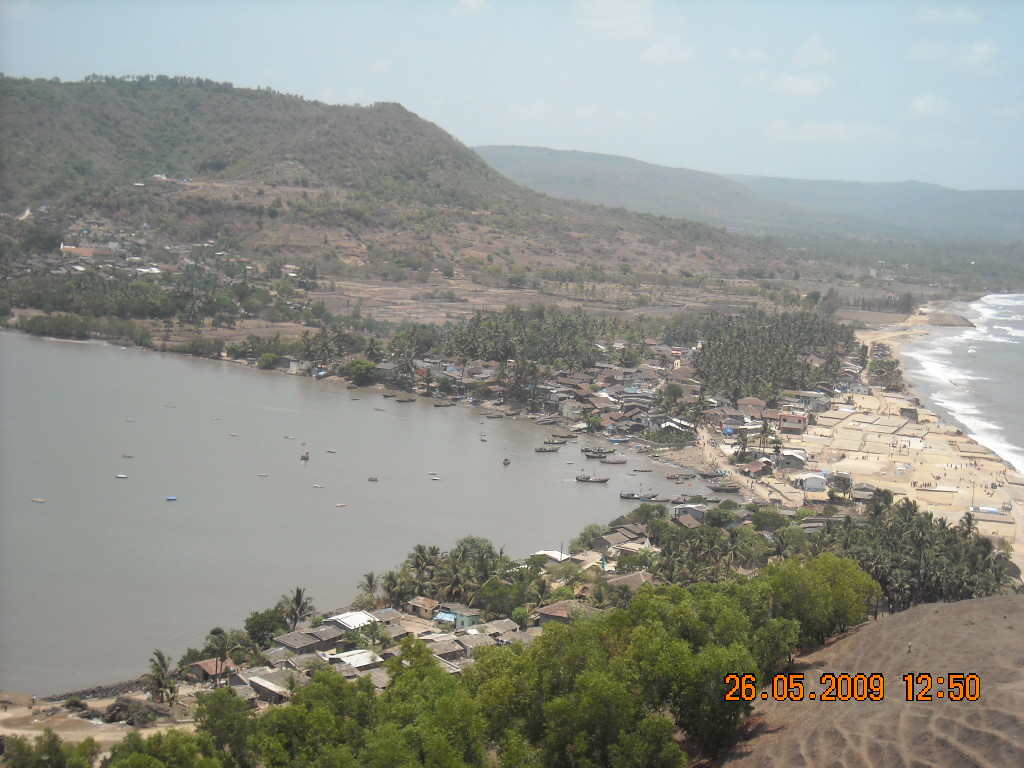
The village of Korlai viewed from Korlai Fort

The development of the language can be traced back to the 1500s with the conception of the new element of society, the native Indian Catholics and Eurasian offspring. The existing caste system within India had a great influence on the creation of KCP (Korlai Creole Portuguese). The Eurasian offspring and the Indian-Eurasian offspring were isolated from the pure-blood Portuguese and other castes. This isolation led them to intermarry and children began learning the pidgin their parents spoke. The Korlai creole emerged among their offspring who converted to Christianity and became a part of the Portuguese community while still adhering to existing caste distinctions. The social isolation faced by this community contributed to the maintenance and growth of the Korlai creole Portuguese.

In today's context, the Kristi community is geographically separated from the rest as the community lives in the 'varcha bhag' [Upper Korlai]. The community also differs from the rest of the area occupationally. Korlai Creole Portuguese speakers are agriculturists whereas the other dominant occupation is of fishers from the Koli, Mali, Agari and a few Maratha communities. Apart from the geographical and occupational differences, the Kristi community differentiates itself linguistically, by the use of 'nɔ ling', an important marker of their identity. However, with the changing times and better connectivity between Korlai and the rest of the world, the language is fading. The newer generation prefers the use of Marathi as it is dominant language of the state and the insistence of the Church, in order to create unison. This is causing a huge influence of Marathi on the language and its development.

== Socio-historical Background ==
Chaul was an important trade city near Korlai and was first visited by the Portuguese in 1505. This area was previously under the Muslim rule from 1318. The Portuguese and the Muslim ruler maintained a friendly relation, however, the relation soon experienced tension and a war broke out. During this time 600 casados, i.e. Portuguese men married the native women who were living outside the Chaul fort along with a large number of Hindu and Muslim shopkeepers. In 1594, the Portuguese took over the fort along with Korlai in the valley of the morro (hill). By 1630, a small Christian community grew when the church, Nossa Senhora do Mar 'Our Lady of the Sea' was built on the hill. The offspring of the casados [Portuguese men] and soldadas [Soldiers] were mainly Christian converts. The Portuguese abandoned Chaul and the hill (Korlai fort) to move to Goa in 1740. After the departure of the Portuguese, many Christians moved to other Portuguese territories like Goa, while the remaining Christians moved closer to the Korlai village and church as the Marathas took control of the region.

In 1740, after the massive Maratha invasion & the loss of Bassein (modern day Vasai province), Portugal preferred to rather cede the town of Chaul to ensure the Marathas retreat along with their allies (Bhonsles) from their prized territory of Goa. While most of the Christians moved to Goa from Chaul, a small group (Around 9 families) was transferred across the river to the Corlaim (Korlai) village that exists today. Franciscan missionaries in 1770 mentioned that the families maintained their Christian roots.

After the Maratha victory around 1740, Peshwa Madhav Rao (Nanasaheb) allowed the Christians in 1764, as an inam to their Marian deity for a nine-day festival. They were also allowed a salvo of 3 guns salute, and the permission for the construction of the Our Lady of Mount Carmel church in Korlai, across the river. The Church of Our Lady of Mount Carmel (Nossa Senhora do Monte Carmo) in Korlai was built on a small promontory in the Korlai (Corlaim) village between 1740-1770 & is among one of the oldest churches in India. Today, a Catholic population of Creole Portuguese speakers' of approximately 1000 inhabitants remain in the Korlai village, apart from the diaspora scattered across Mumbai and beyond.

== Features of Korlai Creole Portuguese ==
Korlai Portuguese vowels are similar to the Middle Portuguese, which was spoken by Portuguese soldiers that came to the region. The sole difference being the point of articulation of the central vowel. Both Marathi and Korlai Creole Portuguese had a decline in nasal vowels and this process of denasalisation is connected for both languages. In the younger generation, Korlai Creole Portuguese also shows an increase in the borrowing of Marathi lexical items. Clements indicated that the language had SVO word order but recent data shows the language now utilizes a SOV word order, which could be attributed to increased influence of Marathi.

== Examples of Nɔ Ling ==
Thanks a lot: Muit'obrigad! From Port. Muito Obrigado
I: yo; From Port. eu
You (singular): wo; From Port. vós
You (formal): usé; From Port. você
He and She: el; From Port. ele (he) and ela (she)
We: no; From Port. nós
You (plural): udzó; From Port. vós outros
They: eló; from Port. eles outros
Numerals: ũ, doy, tre, kwat, sink, sey, set, oyt, nob, dey; From Port. um, dois, três, quatro, cinco, seis, sete, oito, nove, dez
First, Second: Primer, Sigun; From Port. Primeiro, Segundo
How are you?: Use, kile te?
All are eating and drinking their fill: tud gent cumen beben tem fart; From Port. toda a gente come e bebe até fartar

Song of Korlai:

Maldita Maria Madulena,
Maldita firmosa,
Ai, contra ma ja foi a Madulena,
Vastida de mata!

Portuguese translation:

Maldita Maria Madalena,
Maldita Formosa,
Ai, contra minha vontade foi a Madalena,
Vestida de mata!

English translation:

Cursed Maria Madalena,
Cursed Beautiful one,
Oh, against my will it was Madalena,
Dressed in leaves and branches!
