= Luso-Asians =

Ethnic group

Luso-Asians luso-asiáticos
Total population
- c. 1.5 million

Regions with significant populations
- India: ~200,000
- Macau: 8000
- Portugal: ~100,000
- United Kingdom: ~80,000 (Luso-Indians)
- Israel: 60,000
- Sri Lanka: ~40,000 (Burghers)
- Malaysia: 37,000(Kristang)
- Timor Leste: 20,853
- Canada: ~20,000
- United Arab Emirates: 5,500
- Turkey: 4,364
- Thailand: 3,500 (of whom 1,850 from Kudi Chin community)
- Myanmar: ~3,000+
- China: 2,312
- Qatar: 2,293
- Bangladesh: ~2,000+
- Japan: 785
- Indonesia: 667 (not including Lamno, Borgo and Tugu)
- Philippines: 623
- Saudi Arabia: 500
- Taiwan: 312
- South Korea: 190
- Lebanon: 100

Languages
- Portuguese, Konkani, Sri Lankan Portuguese Creole, Kristang, Macanese Patois, Tetum, Malay, Betawi, Ambonese, Cantonese, Marathi, Gujarati, Kannada, Telugu, Malayalam, Tamil, Bengali, Hindustani (Hindi-Urdu), Sinhala, Burmese, English

Religion
- Majority: Christianity (Roman Catholicism); Minority: Hinduism, Islam, Protestantism, Buddhism, Chinese folk religion, Animism

Related ethnic groups
- Bombay East Indians, Luso-Indians, Goan Catholics, Karwari Catholics, Mangalorean Catholics, Burghers, Macanese, Timorese, Eurasians, Anglo-Indians, Kakure Kirishitan

Luso-Asians (Portuguese: luso-asiáticos) are Eurasian people whose ethnicity is partially or wholly Portuguese and ancestrally are based in or hail primarily from Portugal, South Asia, Southeast Asia, and East Asia. They historically came under the cultural and multi-ethnic sway of the Portuguese Empire in the East and retain certain aspects of the Portuguese language, Roman Catholic faith, and Latin cultural practices, including internal and external architecture, art, and cuisine that reflect this contact. The term Luso comes from the Roman Empire's province of Lusitania, which roughly corresponds to modern Portugal.

Luso-Asian Art is also known as Indo-Portuguese Art (from India), Luso-Ceylonese Art (from Sri Lanka), Luso-Siamese Art (from Thailand), Luso-Malay (from Indonesia, Malaysia and Singapore), Sino-Portuguese Art (from China), or Nipo-Portuguese Art (from Japan). Examples of this art, especially of furniture and religious art are found throughout Europe and in the islands of Macaronesia.

Luso-Asians traded and influenced each other within Asia as well as with Portugal and other parts of Catholic Europe, especially Spain and Italy. This exchange produced distinctive elements in domestic, civic and religious Luso-Asian architecture, as well as Luso-Asian cuisine.

== History ==
The European continent exploration of the Asian continent after the arrival of D. Vasco Da Gama during the Age of Discovery in the Indian Ocean around 1498, was followed by the establishments of coastal trading bases called feitorias (factories) and forts. Portuguese traders, Catholic missionaries, who were Franciscans, Dominicans, Augustinians and Jesuits, such as Saint Francis Xavier and administrators poured into the vast region. These men often married local residents with the official encouragement of D. Alfonso de Albuquerque by the royals granted approval in the form called Politicos dos casamentos. A resultant mixed race Mestizo population that was Catholic and Lusophone (Portuguese-speaking) developed. The evangelical work of missionaries produced Catholic Asian communities speaking specific, Portuguese, Asian languages and often a Portuguese-based Creoles who produced religious artifacts, often in ivory, ebony, teak, silver, and gold. Asian women produced distinctive embroideries on velvet, silk, and cotton that were prized in Europe. The movement of Asian wives, Asian and European servants, and African slaves across the Portuguese Empire distributed Luso-Asian recipes throughout Asia and beyond. The people who hail from Portuguese and varied Asian ancestors are termed Luso-Asian.

== Dispersal ==
Lesser coat of arms of Portuguese India between May 8, 1935 – December 31, 1974.

Since the first voyages of the Portuguese into the Indian Ocean at the end of the fifteenth century, the Portuguese suffered a labour shortage as their European crew suffered from scurvy, malaria, and tropical diseases. Additionally the Portuguese relied on local mariners of the Indian Ocean World to guide them through the winds, currents and localized reefs. These men came from the maritime peoples of the region and included Swahili from Eastern Africa, Arabs, Indians from the coastal communities of Gujarat, Goa, Kerala, Tamil Nadu, and Bengal in India, Malays, and Chinese. As Portuguese trade increased in the sixteenth century, more Portuguese vessels arrived in Asia but an increasing number of European crew were leaving the ships to engage in local or "country trade". Some Portuguese even joined forces with local pirates.

The Portuguese coined the term Lascarim from the Arab-Persian Lashkari to describe any crew from East of the Cape of Good Hope. Coming from areas of Portuguese influence, these men often spoke their own languages and broken Portuguese, which in time evolved into a creole Portuguese. The Lascarim became invaluable to further Portuguese exploration, defense and trade. The English East India Company employed Luso-Asians who they called Lascars in their very first voyages from London at the beginning of the seventeenth century, and by the eighteenth century, Lascars were common on British East India Company ships in the Atlantic. Luso-Asians arrived at ports in Europe, North America, Brazil and the Atlantic coasts of Africa.

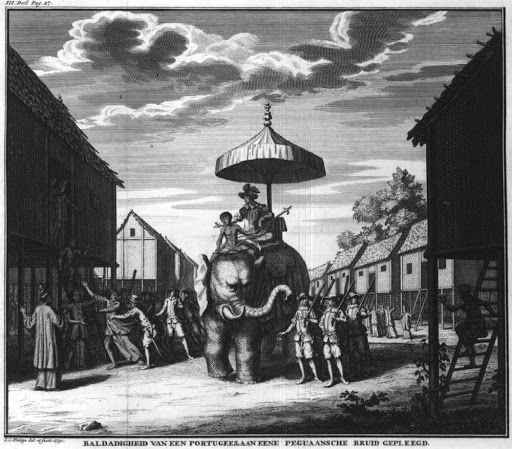
Portuguese ruler and soldiers mounting an Elephant in Myanmar

The dispersal of Luso-Asians occurred very early after the contact between Portugal and the late medieval nations of Asia. Indians, Siamese, Malays, Chinese and Japanese travelled to Portugal as sailors, clerics, servants, slaves and ambassadors. Many male Luso-Asians entered trade within the Portuguese maritime empire and many Luso-Asian women joined their Portuguese husbands or masters in official or unofficial capacities within the Portuguese sphere of influence. This genetic and cultural mixing especially between Portugal, Cochin, Goa, Ayutthaya, Malacca, Macau and Nagasaki in the sixteenth and early seventeenth century marks the first dispersal.

A second dispersal occurred in the seventeenth century as former Portuguese strongholds fell under the English or Dutch East India Companies, and with the loss of Portuguese privileges in Japan. Luso-Asians were dispersed as prisoners and refugees in this movement. Many Dutchmen in Ceylon, Malacca, Batavia and Timor married Luso-Asian women and this resulted in distinct Eurasian or Burgher communities. In Bengal, Kerala, around Madras and Bombay a similar process led to the creation of the Anglo-Indian communities. There was also some contribution of Ludo-Asians to French colonies in India. Luso-Asians from Malacca and Solor Island fled the Dutch and moved to Larantuka on Flores Island, where they mixed with the local Flores islanders, Papuans, Timorese and European men (both Portuguese and Dutch deserters) to form a unique Larantuqueiro culture.

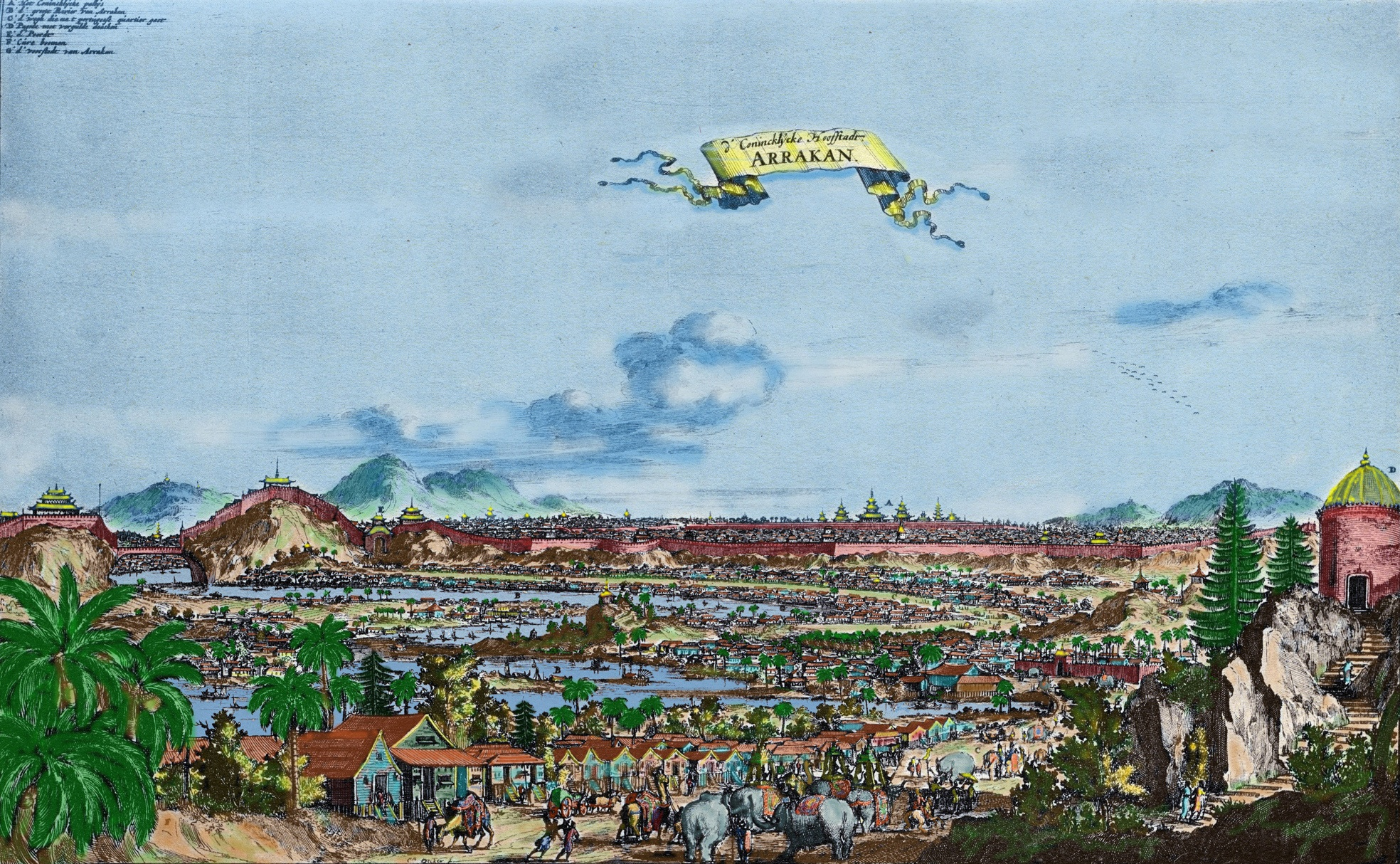
View of Mrauk-U, or Arrakan (city of Arakan) in the foreground the Portuguese quarter

The third dispersal came in the nineteenth century with the rise of British imperial power. The rise of British rule in Asia, corresponded with population increase in Goa and Macau and a general feeling that the Portuguese had all but forgotten their Asian colonies. Three events in particular provided the movement of Luso-Asians to areas under British influence; the signing of the Treaty of Nanjing in 1842 opened-up Hong Kong and Shanghai to the Macanese, and increased migration of Malacca Portuguese to Singapore. The opening of the Suez Canal in 1869 brought opportunities for Goans in Aden. Finally the creation of the British Protectorate of Zanzibar in 1890 and development of the Uganda Railway brought further opportunities for Goans in East Africa.

A final dispersion occurred in the later half of the twentieth century. This last phase of dispersal was connected to European de-colonisation in Asia and Africa and increased nationalism and indigenisation in the new post-colonial nation states. In Asia the partition and creation of India and Pakistan, followed by the annexation of Goa were prime motivation for Luso-Asian migration within the Indian sub-continent. The rise of opportunities in the Persian Gulf absorbed much Luso-Asian migration. Similarly, there was Luso-Asian migration from independent Malaysia to Singapore. However, in the late 1960s Africanisation in East Africa brought about Luso-Asian migration from Kenya, Tanzania and Uganda to the United Kingdom and after 1971 to Australia and Canada. The mass expulsion of the Ugandan Asians in 1972 and that of Goans from Malawi added to the flow. The 1975 independence of Angola, Mozambique and to a lesser extent Cape Verde provided further refugee migration of Luso-Asians to Portugal and Brazil. In the last quarter of the twentieth century the departure of the Portuguese from Macau and the British from Hong Kong led to the migration of Luso-Asians (mainly Macanese) to Australia, Canada and the USA. Arabisation in the Persian Gulf and increased persecution in Pakistan added to Luso-Asian migration to the same countries.

== Ethnic legacy ==
A nineteenth-century Konbaung pennant of a Burmese artillery unit made up of European descendants.

Luso-Asian communities still exist in Asia and includes several diverse communities in parts of:

- Republic of India (Goa, Daman, Diu, Dadra, Nagar Haveli, Korlai, Salsette, Kerala)
- China (Macau)
- Pakistan (Karachi)
- Malaysia (Malacca)
- Sri Lanka
- Timor Leste

who are collectively known as Luso-Asians. However, many Anglo-Indians and Eurasians can also be categorized as luso-asians because they have Luso-Indian ancestors especially on their female side. There is also a distinct Konkani-speaking Catholic community who call themselves East Indians and reside in Mumbai and who were under Portuguese rule prior to Bombay being handed to the British in 1661.

== Luso-South Asians ==
=== Luso-Indians (Indo-Portuguese, Luso-Goans or Portu-Goeses) ===
See main article Luso-Indians, Sephardic Jews in India

Indians and Luso-Goans are people who have mixed varied Asian, Indian subcontinental and Portuguese ancestry and are either citizens of India, Pakistan or Bangladesh today. They may also be people of Portuguese descent born or living in the Republic of India and resident in other parts of the world. Most Luso-Indians and Luso-Goans live in former Portuguese overseas territories of the Estado da India that are currently part of the Republic of India.

==== Indian subcontinent ====
Luso-Asians are primarily from the Indian states of Goa, Daman and Diu, Korlai, parts of Tamil Nadu, and parts of Kerala. In the Coromandel Coast, Luso-Indians were generally known as Topasses. They are majority Catholic and may have spoken or presently speak Portuguese Creole.

===== India, Daman =====
There are currently about 2000 people who speak Portuguese Creole in Daman.

===== India, Diu =====
In Diu, the Portuguese Creole language is nearly extinct. However, the Catholic community is very much alive.

===== Indian subcontinent, Goa: Luso-Goesas, Portu-Goesas, and Luso-Goans =====
Goa was the capital of a large Portuguese eastern empire. The Luso-Goan ethnicity is considered as being of Portuguese patrilineal descent mixed with Persian, Goud Saraswat Brahmin, Kunbi, Kharvi and other Konkani origins. Some also have African maternal ancestry due to Goa's contacts with the African territories of Portugal and the British African colonies. The mixed-race Luso-Goans are called Mestiços in the Portuguese language. Luso-Goans, or Porto-Goesas as they are also known in Portuguese, speak Konkani and some speak Portuguese though today most speak English as well. Their Konkani dialect is written in the Roman script and has a larger infusion of words of Portuguese origin as compared to the Konkani spoken by other communities.

Portuguese was the language for the governance of overseas province for over 450 years but it was never spoken as a first language by the majority of the population of Goa. Today, Portuguese is spoken as a first language only by few upper-class Catholic families and the older generation. However, the annual number of Goans learning Portuguese as a second language has been continuously increasing in the twenty-first century.

During the period of absolute monarchy in Portugal, the Portuguese nobility residing in Goa enjoyed the most privileged status and held the most important government offices, and high positions in the hierarchy of the Roman Catholic Church. The influence of the nobles decreased substantially with the introduction of the constitutional monarchy in 1834, although the erosion of their power had begun with the accession of the Marquis de Pombal as the Prime Minister of Portugal in the mid-eighteenth century. After Portugal became a republic in 1910, some Luso-Goan descendants of the nobility at Goa continued to bear their families' titles according to standards sustained by the Instituto da Nobreza Portuguesa (Institute of Portuguese Nobility), traditionally under the authority of the head of the formerly ruling House of Braganza. The economic decline of Portugal that began with the period of Spanish rule and British and Dutch global advancement in the seventeenth century forced Goans to migrate to Bombay and Pune, and by the nineteenth century to Calcutta and Karachi.

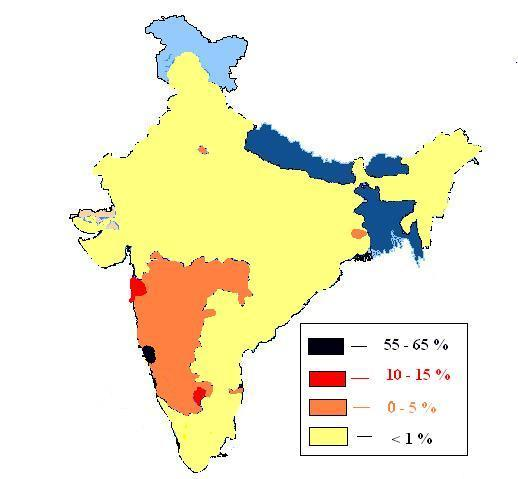
Distribution of Goan Catholics in India

The last newspaper in Portuguese ended publication in 1980s. However, the "Fundação do Oriente" and the Indo–Portuguese Friendship Society (Sociedade de Amizade Indo-Portuguesa) are still active. Many signs in Portuguese are still visible over shops and administrative buildings in Goan cities like Panjim, Margão and Vasco da Gama. After the Indian annexation of Goa, the Indian government has changed the Portuguese names of many places and institutes. There is a department of Portuguese language at the Goa University and the majority of Luso-Goan students choose Portuguese as their third language in schools. Luso-Goans have a choice to either be fully Portuguese citizens or fully Indian citizens or fully Portuguese citizens with an OCI (Overseas citizenship of India) granted by the Indian nationality law.

Some famous Goan Luso-Asians:

- Fernao Vaz Dourado (c.1520 – c.1580). Born in Goa of a Portuguese father and Indian mother, he was a cartographer who first drew the more rounder shape of Sri Lanka.
- Casimiro Monteiro (1920–1993). Born in Goa of a Portuguese father and a Goan mother, he was the PIDE agent responsible for the assassination of Humberto Delgado.

===== India, Kerala =====
Kochi. Portuguese Cochin was the first capital of the Portuguese Eastern Empire. Numerous churches attest to the Portuguese presence. The church of St. Francis which is the oldest European church in India, once contained the body of Vasco da Gama In Kochi, Luso-Indians now number about 2,000.

===== India, Maharashtra =====
Mumbai. When the English East India Company began to rule in India, many former Portuguese settlements and trading posts (called Feitoria in Portuguese) passed to the company. The mixed Indian-Portuguese and Indian converts began to speak English in place of the Portuguese and some of them also anglicised their names. They are, now, part of the East Indian community of Bombay.

Korlai. About 900 monolingual people currently speak Creole Portuguese in Korlai called Korlai Indo-Portuguese.

===== India, Tamil Nadu =====
Negapatam. In Negapatam, in 1883, there were 20 families that spoke Creole Portuguese.

==== Pakistan ====
===== Pakistan, Sindh =====
In the nineteenth century many Luso-Indians from Goa, Diu, Daman and Bombay migrated to the developing city of Karachi in the province of Sindh. After the partition of India, these Luso-Indians continued to live in the Islamic Republic of Pakistan. However, in recent years thousands have left the country for Canada, the United Kingdom and Australia.

==== Bangladesh ====
Chittagong, Firingi Bazar, Dhaka

Firingi Bazar. During the Portuguese times of colonialism in India. The Portuguese settled down on Chittagong in 1528. During this time, Portuguese descendants began to emerge known as Farangs. Most of these Farangs settled in a place called Firingi Bazar and the capital of modern day Bangladesh, Dhaka. Until the early 20th century, Portuguese was still spoken and even a creole existed called Bengali Portuguese Creole. In 2024, many Bengali Christians have Portuguese surnames and many link back to Luso-Asians and Luso-Indian heritage. However in Bangladesh, and in the Indian states of Odisha, West Bengal, Assam and Bihar only a few thousand of these descendants remain.

=== Luso-Sri Lankan or Luso-Ceylonese ===
See main article Burgher people, Portuguese Burghers, Mestiços, Sri Lanka Kaffirs, History of the Jews in Sri Lanka

==== Sri Lanka ====
In Sri Lanka, the Portuguese were followed by the Dutch and the British and the Portuguese burghers are represented today by the Burgher or Eurasian community. However, there is a specific community people of African origin who speak Sri Lankan Portuguese Creole. Additionally, Portuguese names, Catholicism and aspects of Luso-Asian Architecture are found among the fishing communities of the Northwest coast of Sri Lanka.

There are also surnames of Sephardi Portuguese Jewish origin.

== Luso-Southeast Asians ==
=== Luso-Burmese ===
==== Myanmar ====
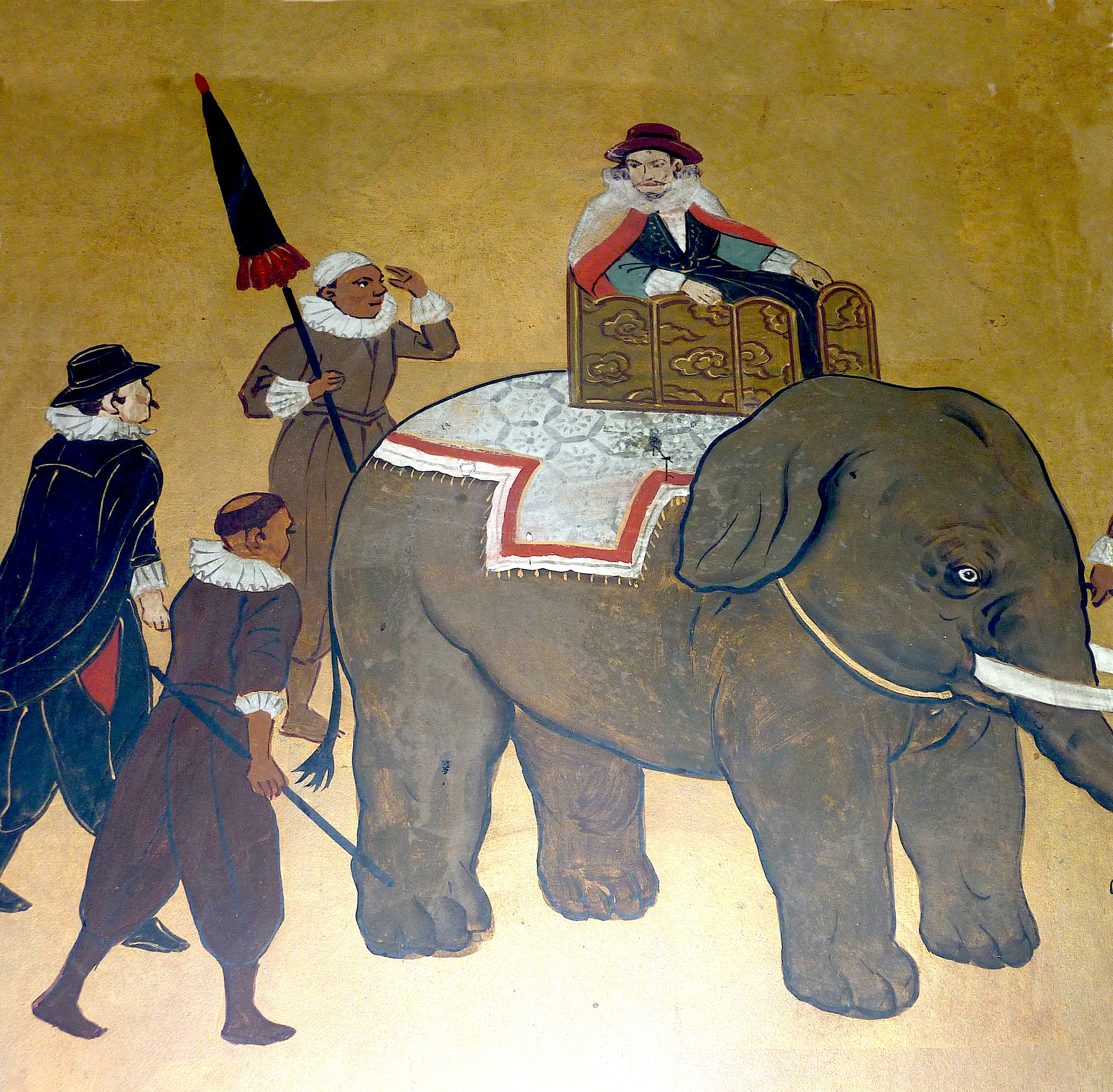
Filipe de Brito, Portuguese mercenary and governor of Syriam, Burma, circa 1600.

See main article Bayingyi people

Portuguese people have a long history in Myanmar, with many Bayingyi people, from Upper Myanmar, particularly the Sagaing Region, claiming partial or entire Portuguese Origin. These Portuguese origins date back to the sixteenth and seventeenth century Burmese artillery and musketeer corps, made up exclusively of foreign (Portuguese and Muslim) mercenaries, such as Filipe de Brito e Nicote. Portuguese mercenaries did not return to Portugal, and settled in their own hereditary villages in Upper Burma where they practiced their own religion and followed their own customs. It is reasonable that there are at least 3,000 Bayingyi in Myanmar to this day, with an 1830 census purporting around 3,000 Bayingyis, and it is entirely possible many thousands more have some Portuguese ancestry. Centuries of inter-marriage have left the Bayingyi more or less assimilated into the Bamar ethnic group of Myanmar, but they have still kept their sense of Portuguese identity and Roman Catholic religion.

- Filipe de Brito e Nicote, the Portuguese adventurer, mercenary, and former Governor of Syriam, is an example of a famous Bayingyi person.

===== Yangon (Formerly Rangoon) =====
Prior to the Second World War, Yangon, then known as Rangoon, had a thriving Portuguese community. The community was primarily composed of Eurasians of Asian-Portuguese origin and ethnic Goans, as well as few Burgher people from Sri Lanka, and some European Portuguese.

=== Luso-Malay or Malayo-Portuguese ===
See main article Portuguese Indonesians, Kristang people and Eurasian Singaporeans

==== Indonesia ====
There were many Portuguese communities in the "Spice Islands" prior to the arrival of the Dutch in the seventeenth century. Many of these communities included Luso-Malay people who eventually merged with the Dutch to form Eurasian communities. However, one particular community of Catholic Luso-Asians survives bearing Portuguese-derived surnames in the predominantly Muslim state of Indonesia. This community is based on the island of Flores in and around the town of Larantuka. The communities are known as the Larantuqueiros.

==== Malaysia ====
Luso-Malays are represented by the speakers of Kristang or Malay Creole Portuguese based at Kampong Ferangi near Melaka in Malaysia; Luso-Malays are descendants of Luso-Asians from Goa, Sri Lanka, and Indonesia. Many Luso-Malays possess Chinese blood. Many Luso-Malays emigrated to Penang and Singapore during the period of the Straits Settlement. Luso-Asians married into the European community of the region and many Eurasians in Malaysia and Singapore have Luso-Asian origins.

Famous Luso-Malays include:

- Manuel Godinho de Erédia (1563–1623). Born in Melaka of an Aragonese-Portuguese father and a mother from Makassar. Eredia was an author, cartographer and surveyor.
- Tony Fernandes (1964–). Born in Kuala Lumpur. Founder of the airline company Air Asia.

==== Singapore ====
Singapore has a community of Eurasians who claim origin from the Luso-Malays of Melaka.

==== Timor Leste ====
Luso-Asians in the seventeenth to eighteenth centuries of Timorese history were called Topasses. They belonged to various communities under their own Captains.

Portuguese was restored in Timor Leste as one of the official languages. Timorese Portuguese is a legacy of Portuguese rule of Timor-Leste (called Portuguese Timor) from the sixteenth century. It had its first contact during the Portuguese discoveries of the East, but it was largely exposed to Portuguese Timor in the eighteenth century after its division from the rest of the island by the Netherlands.

However, Tetum remained the main lingua franca of Timor-Leste during Portuguese rule, although the most commonly used form, known as Tetun-Prasa used in Dili, was heavily influenced by Portuguese. Following the Carnation Revolution in Portugal in 1974, political parties emerged in Portuguese Timor for the first time, all of which supported the continued use of Portuguese, including APODETI, the only party to advocate integration with Indonesia, which stated that it would support the right to "enjoy the Portuguese language" alongside Indonesian.

On December 7, 1975, nine days after declaring independence from Portugal, Timor-Leste was invaded by Indonesia, which declared the territory as its 27th province in 1976, with Indonesian as the sole official language. During the Indonesian occupation, the use of Portuguese in education, administration and the media was banned by the Indonesian authorities, which saw the language as a threat. This was despite the fact that the 'People's Assembly', which petitioned President Suharto for integration with Indonesia, conducted its proceedings in Portuguese, under a banner reading "Integração de Timor Timur na República da Indonésia" (Integration of East Timor into the Republic of Indonesia).

The last school to teach in Portuguese, the Externato São José, was closed in 1992.

The reintroduction of Portuguese as an official language aroused criticism amongst Indonesian-educated youth, but according to the 2004 census, 36.7% of respondents aged 6 years and older (or 272,638 out of a total of 741,530) said they had “a capability in Portuguese.”

Luso-Timorese who were educated in Indonesian educational system only speak Tetum and Indonesian; those who do speak Portuguese speak the language after its reintroduction and as 2nd or 3rd language, & learned Portuguese later in life.Code-switching between the two languages is common.

=== Luso-Thai (Thai-Portuguese, Luso-Siamese) ===
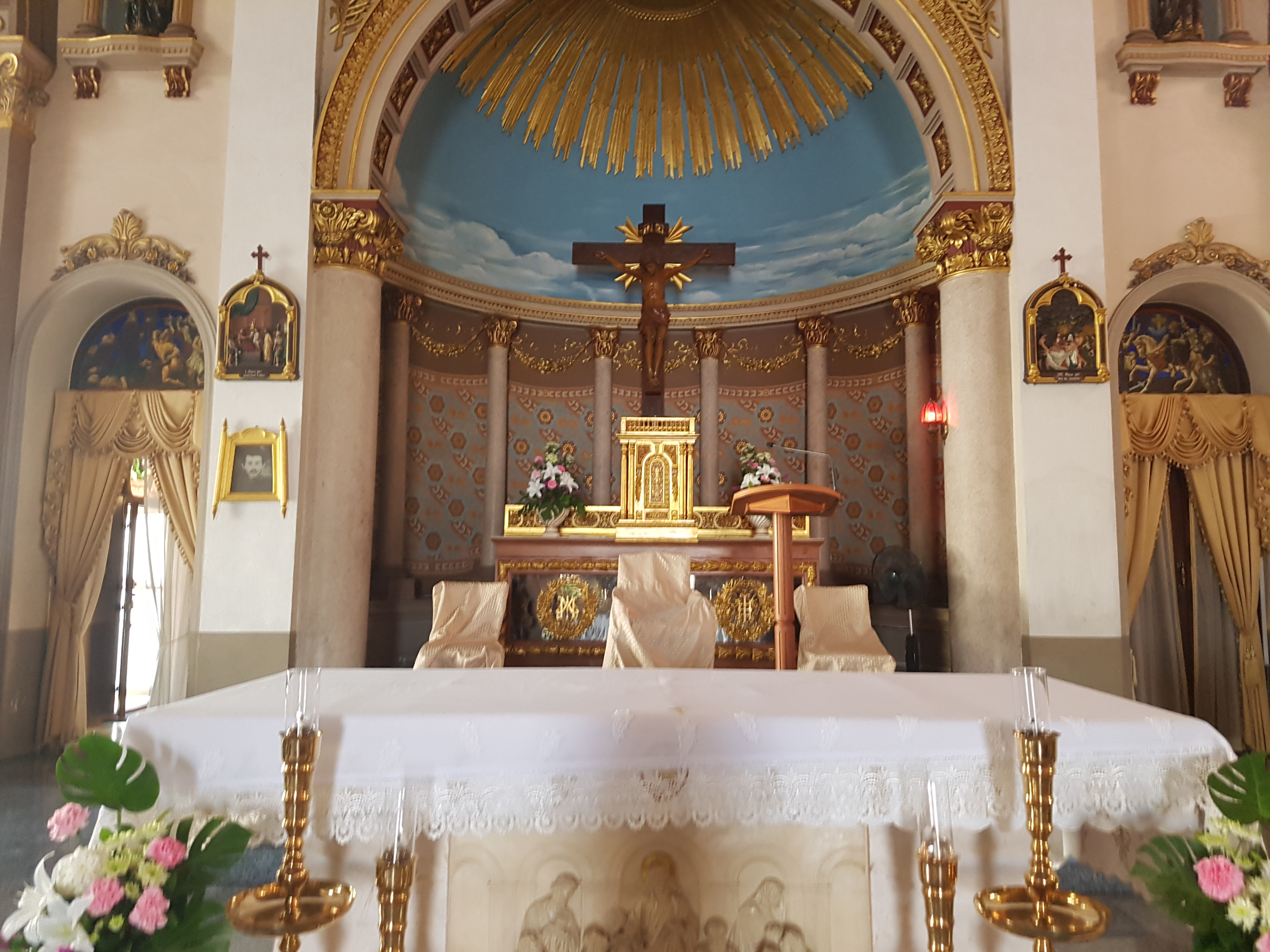
Inside Santa Cruz Church, Thon Buri District, Bangkok, constructed by Portuguese monks in the eighteenth century.

The Portuguese established a trading base in the city of Ayutthaya where they intermarried with the Thai and also brought men and women from other Luso-Asian areas in East Asia, South Asia, and Southeast Asia. The Portuguese also established missions in the area of Bangkok. Luso-Asians from Japan were important in the Japanese trading settlement at Ayutthaya, Thailand and at the Vietnamese trading port of Hoi An. According to an 1830 census there were around 1,400 – 2,000 Portuguese in Bangkok, so it would be reasonable to assume, that due to intermarriage and the remaining Portuguese influence on areas of the city, including Portuguese-built Catholic Churches like Santa Cruz Church, that around 2,000 descendants of Portuguese traders remain in Thailand.

== Luso-East Asians ==
=== Luso-Chinese (Cantonese-Portuguese) ===
==== China ====
===== China, Macau SAR =====
The migration of Portuguese and Luso-Asians from Goa, Daman, Diu, Sri Lanka, Malacca, the Straits Settlements (not just Portuguese-Malay descent, also included are Portuguese-Tankas & Luso-Indians), Indonesia (including Timor and mixed Portuguese-Tanka people), Thailand, and Japan to Macau was from 1553 to about 1850. Through most of its history as a Portuguese colony, the people of Macau have been predominantly Cantonese-speaking, however, there was and still is a small community of Macanese who speak Creole-Portuguese and are Catholic. Portuguese is an official language in Macau; despite being a Portuguese colony for over 4 centuries, the Portuguese language was never widely spoken in Macau and remained limited to administration and higher education. It was spoken primarily by the Portuguese colonists, Luso-Asians, and elites and middle-class people of pure Cantonese blood. As a consequence, when Macau was handed back to China in 1999, Portuguese did not have a strong presence like English had in Hong Kong and continued its decline which began when Macau was still under Portuguese rule. Nevertheless, it was only after Portuguese rule ended that the Portuguese language in Macau began to see an increase in speakers due to China's increased trading relations with Lusophone countries. Central government of China protected Portuguese heritage of Macau & Portuguese language as an official language of Macau as Macau is a special administrative region. Currently, there is only one school in Macau where Portuguese is the medium of instruction, the Macau Portuguese School, and Portuguese is also mainly taught in government schools. There has been an increase in the teaching of Portuguese owing to the growing trade links between China and Lusophone nations such as Portugal, Brazil, Angola, Mozambique, and East Timor, with 5,000 students learning the language. Today, about 3% of Macau's population speaks Portuguese as a first language and 7% of the population professes fluency. Many Luso-Chinese since 1974 to present never learned to speak Portuguese as they switched from Portuguese to English-medium high school education, particularly as many of parents recognised the diminishing value of Portuguese schooling; if they do speak Portuguese, they speak it as second or third language, & they learn it later in life, whether adolescence or adulthood. Code-switching between Cantonese and Portuguese is commonly heard.

Since 1942 and especially after 1970 there has been as steady migration of Macanese from Macau and Hong Kong to Australia, Canada, the US, New Zealand, Portugal, the UK and Brazil.

===== China, Hong Kong SAR =====
Luso-Asians have long been part of the making of Hong Kong. The first Luso-Asians in the territory of the Hong Kong SAR were probably Luso-Asian sailors on Portuguese ships bound for Macau. In fact Lama Island in the territory was named by the Portuguese. After 1557, Traders and missionaries followed, and from 1841 to 1942 various "Portuguese" families from Macau of mixed Portuguese, Cantonese, Macanese and Goan origin settled in the early British settlement. The early settlement was on Hong Kong island near to the docks, banks, civil service institutions, publishing houses and other workplaces where the men were employed in mid-level positions. Later settlement was in Kowloon. Their role in the British colony as social, economic and political intermediaries between the British and Chinese defined them and limited their outlook and expectations as settlers. As a result, they were drawn to institutions that provided family-support, shelter, and cohesion. They were as a result the backbone of the Catholic Church, schools and benevolent societies. During the Second World War almost the entire Macanese community (now known as "Portuguese") fled to neutral Macau as refugees. These Macanese, including many skilled workers and civil servants, were fluent in English and Portuguese and brought valuable commercial and technical skills to the colony.

===== China, Shanghai =====
Late nineteenth- and early twentieth-century Shanghai contained a flourishing community of Luso-Asians composed of Macanese, Luso-Chinese, Goans and Eurasians from the Straits Settlements, Indonesia (including Timor and mixed Portuguese-Cantonese people), Thailand, and Japan. Portuguese settlers acted as middlemen between other foreigners and the Chinese in the "Paris of the Orient". Luso-Asians emigrated from Shanghai to Macau in 1949 with the coming of the Communist government. Many spoke little Portuguese and were several generations removed from Portugal, speaking primarily English and Shanghainese, and/or Mandarin. The Shanghai Macanese carved a niche by teaching English in Macau. Only the children and grandchildren of Luso-Shanghainese settlers who were born and raised in Macau have the ability to speak Portuguese.

=== Luso-Japanese (Nipo-Portuguese) ===
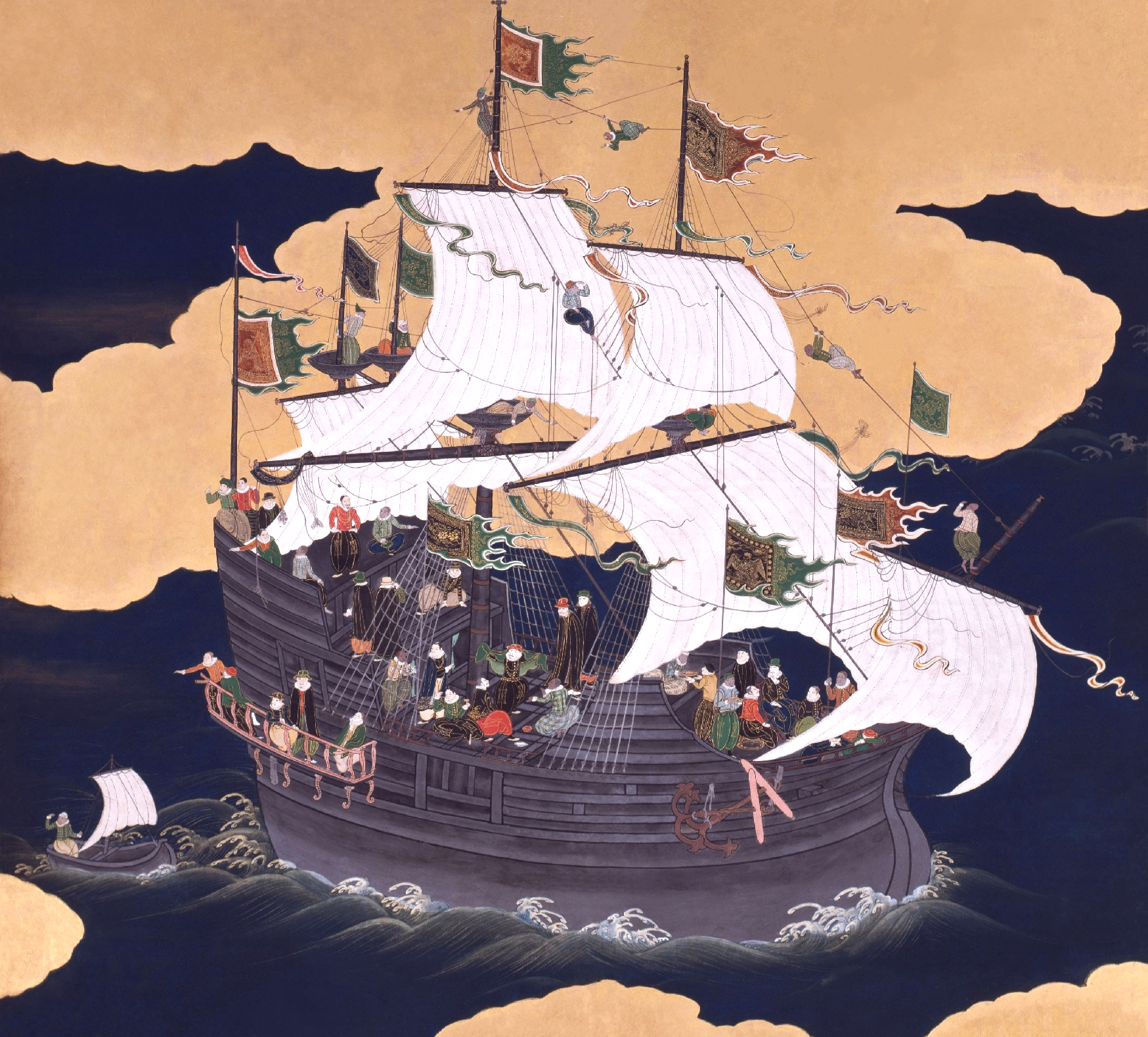
Portuguese traders arriving in Nagasaki, seventeenth century.

Portuguese influence in sixteenth and seventeenth centuries led to communities of Japanese Christians. Following the expulsion of the Portuguese, Japanese Christians fled to Macau, Manila, Hoi An (Vietnam) and Ayutthaya, others remained in Japan as secret or Crypto-Christians.

== Legacy in other countries ==
=== Luso-Asians in the nineteenth-century exploration of Africa ===
Luso-Asians have a long history of presence in Africa. Luso-Asians were brought to Ethiopia in the sixteenth century and were among the builders of the Castle of Gondar. Luso-Asians as soldiers, wives, servants, slaves and concubines and clergy were present at Portuguese bases such as Malindi, Mombasa and Mozambique Island in the seventeenth century. Luso-Asians were important in the story of European exploration in Africa in the nineteenth century. Important individuals of Luso-Asian origin include:

- Valentine Rodrigues and Gaetano Andrade (Caitan) who accompanied the British explorers Richard Burton and John Hanning Speke in 1856 on their search for the source of the Nile. These were the first recorded South Asians to enter Rwanda.
- The cook Pinto who accompanied James Hannington the first Anglican Bishop to Eastern Equatorial Africa in 1885. The party was ambushed and the skull of Pinto was recovered and was buried under the altar of the Anglican Cathedral in Kampala, Uganda.
- Caetan who accompanied Dr. Arthur Donaldson Smith in his 1899–1900 expedition from Berbera through Northern Somalia, the Ogaden Desert of Southern Ethiopia and Northern Kenya to Juba on the River Nile in present-day South Sudan. He then travelled down the Nile to Egypt.

== Luso-Asians in Eastern Africa ==
The Luso-Asian presence in Eastern Africa stretches back to the sixteenth century development of Portuguese trading bases or feitoria (known to the British as factories), guarded by forts. Luso-Asian men came to East Africa as sailors, masons, merchants and clergy while women came as wives, servants and concubines. Goans were present at Fort Jesus and in the Portuguese settlement at Mombasa in the seventeenth century.

The nineteenth century saw the rise of a Goan community in Zanzibar, and as the Imperial British East African Company (IBEAC) grew on the mainland the Goan community expanded to the coast at Mombasa, Malindi and Lamu. When the British built the Uganda Railway, Goan communities spread to the Kenya Highlands and into Uganda.

Early twentieth-century Nairobi, Kisumu, Kampala, Entebbe and Jinja had a strong Goan presence. The German railway development in Tanganyika before World War One also relied on Goans and communities developed in Dar-es-Salaam, Arusha and especially at Tanga.

With the arrival of independence after 1960, the numbers of Goans in all East African countries plummeted due to a process of Africanisation, coupled with the absorption of Goa into the Indian Union in 1961.

=== Luso-Asians in Kenya ===
Luso-Asians, mainly from India first came to the area of Kenya in the sixteenth century under the Portuguese. Their presence was initially at the port of Mombasa and the Portuguese settlement by the fort, and possibly at Malindi and the Lamu Islands. The numbers of Luso-Indians was probably never more than a few hundred.

With increasing British influence along the coast in the nineteenth century, the Goans returned as an extension of the Goan migration to Bombay. The Goan population numbered 169 in 1896. The expansion of the British trade and the building of the Uganda Railway. Initially, most Goans were from North Goa and some were connected to older families from Zanzibar. Goan immigration continued in the interwar period when it also came from South Goa and spread along the railway route to Nairobi and Port Florence or Kisumu. By 1931 there were 1080 Goans in the Kenya Colony and Protectorate, there was some lowering of numbers during the Second World War when families were evacuated to neutral Goa. But the numbers stood at 1733 in 1948 as families returned. Goans in Kenya dominated the Civil Service especially the Railways and Customs departments, they were also employed in the banking, industrial and agricultural sectors as administrators and clerks. Some were doctors, teachers and clergy. The largest community was in Kenya where a process of Kenyanisation from 1963 to 1970 resulted in the emigration of 80% of the Goan community. Those with British or British Protectorate passports were admitted to the United Kingdom, others went to India. After 1970 Canada and Australia admitted many Goans and a few emigrated to Brazil.

Famous Luso-Asians from Kenya include:

- Seraphino Antao (1937–2011). Born in Mombasa. Runner Kenya's first Olympic Flag bearer and first international medallist.
- Franklyn Pereira (1945–2018). Born in Mombasa. Honorary Portuguese Consul in Kenya, sportsman and businessman.
- Pio Gama Pinto (1927–1965). Born in Nairobi. Independence era politician and Kenyan nationalist. Assassinated in Nairobi.

=== Luso-Asians in Uganda ===
The majority of Goans in Uganda were employed in the Civil Service. As centres of administration there were concentrations of Goans at Entebbe and at Kampala, with another community in the industrial town of Jinja. The Goans of Uganda built many churches and schools in Uganda and volunteered to serve in the army in World War One against the Germans in Tanganyika. The Ugandan national costume known as the Gomesi was designed by a Goan. The Expulsion of Asians from Uganda by Idi Amin in 1972 virtually removed the entire Goan community from Uganda. The largest number of these Goans went to Canada. Smaller numbers went to the UK and India.

== Luso-Asians in Southern Africa ==
Luso-Asians have been part of the history of the present states of Mozambique, Zambia, Zimbabwe, and Malawi since the sixteenth century. These Luso-Asians had their origin in India, but also Thailand and Macau. Luso-Asians were important in the role of the Afro-Portuguese prazo landlords. In the seventeenth century Portuguese sources describe the Goans in Mozambique as "Canarans".

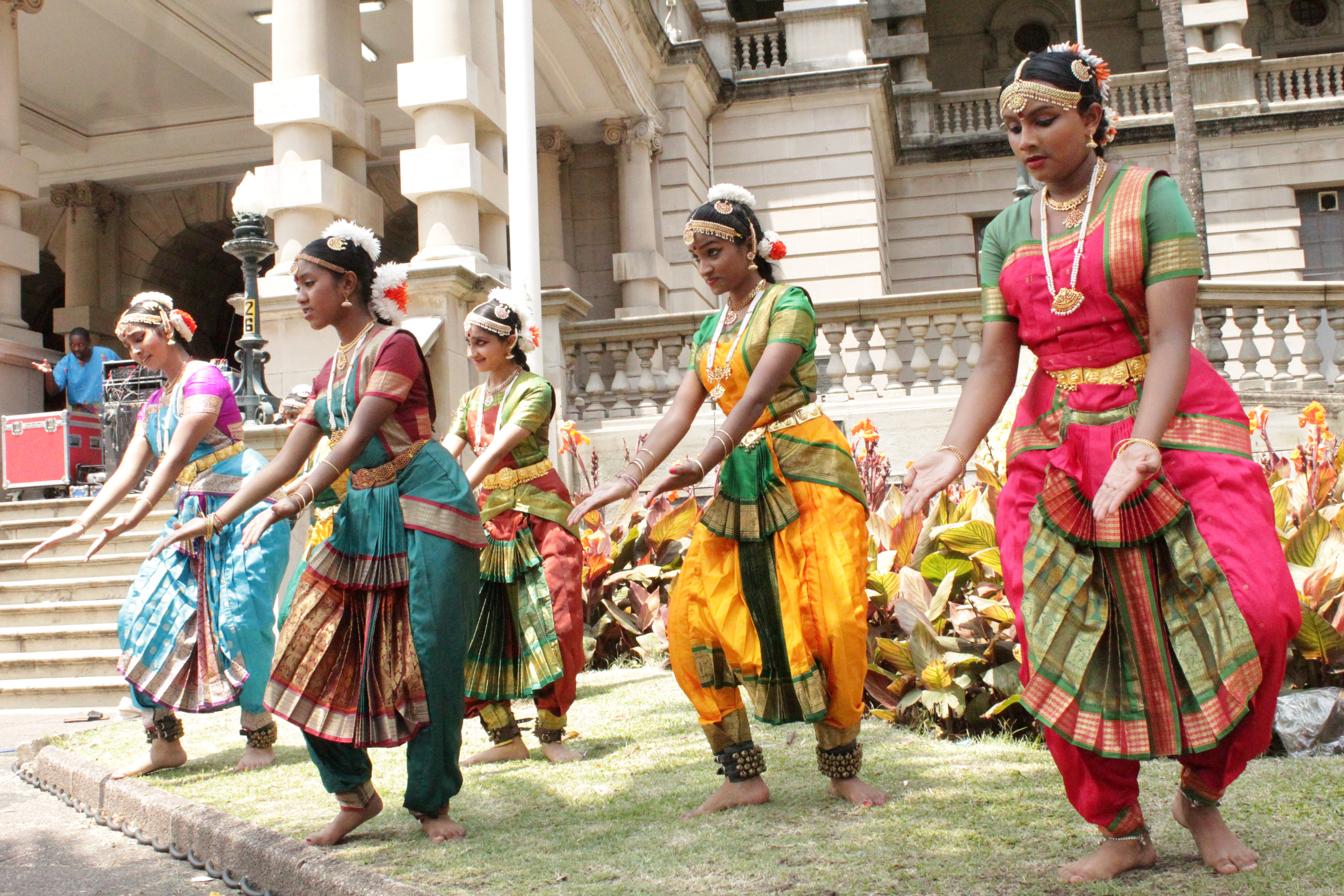
Indian dancers in the Indoni Parade, 2018, Durban, South Africa

=== Luso-Asians in Malawi ===
One group of Uganda Goans were contracted to work in Malawi in the 1960s. The Malawi Goan community were expelled in 1974 by the government of Hastings Banda.

=== Luso-Asians in Mozambique ===
In early twentieth-century Mozambique Luso-Indians or "Portuguese-Indians", both Catholic and Hindu, were considered quite distinct to British Indians. Both groups were part of the "Não-Indígena" population. The 1928 census counted 3478 Portuguese-Indians in Mozambique.

=== Luso-Asians in Angola ===
As part of the Portuguese Empire, Luso-Asians were encouraged to settle in Angola before the 1960s, some who held posts in government in Mozambique and Portugal, particularly after the inclusion of Goa into the India in 1961 were designated jobs there by the Salazar regime until the overthrow of the dictatorship. After the revolution in Portugal, multiple socialist and communist factions broke into open warfare and most Luso-Asians fled to Portugal. Some however were part of the post-independence movements and subsequent government.

Famous Luso-Asians from Angola include:

- Sita Valles (1951–1977). Born in Luanda. Nationalist and political activist who was executed in Angola.

=== Luso-Asians in South Africa ===
See Luso-Indians and Indian South Africans.

== Luso-Asians in Western Asia (including the Persian Gulf) ==
Famous Gulf Luso-Asians include:

- Jacqueline Fernandez. (1985–) Born in Bahrain of Luso-Sri Lankan parents. Actress.

== Luso-Asians in Europe ==
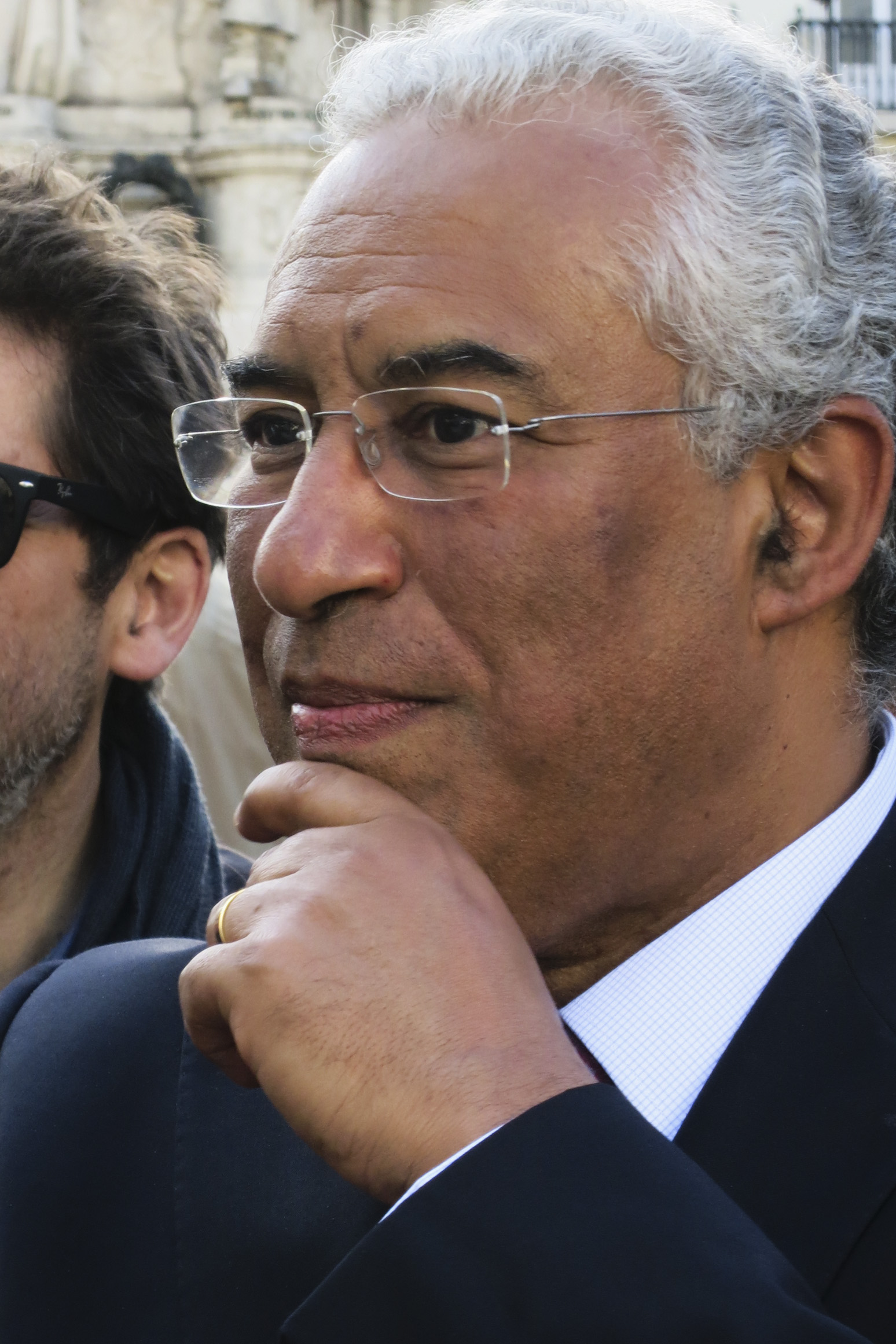
António Costa, former Prime Minister of Portugal from the 26th of November 2015 to 7th of November 2023.

=== Luso-Asians in Portugal ===
A large part of Portugal's Asian community is composed of people of Luso-Asian origin from Goa, Daman and Diu, Macau and Timor-Leste as well as Asian migrants of no Luso connection such as the Ismailis. The Luso-Asian community dates back to the sixteenth-century Age of Discovery. The Indian annexation of Goa, Daman, and Diu and the independence of Mozambique and Angola resulted in an increased number of people of Luso-Asian origin in Portugal. There was also some emigration from Macau and Timor-Leste. Most Luso-Asians from Macau and Hong Kong settled in the Lisbon area, though there are smaller numbers in Porto, Faro, Setúbal and Coimbra.

Famous Luso-Asians in Portugal include:

- António Costa (1961–) Born in Lisbon of Goan and French-Portuguese parents. Mayor of Lisbon (2007–2015) and former Prime Minister of Portugal (2015–2024).

=== Luso-Asians in United Kingdom ===
Luso-Asian and Lusitania people have existed in the United Kingdom since the sixteenth century, when seamen, servants, and slaves arrived through the Portuguese trade network. A few Luso-Asians were members of the first English East India Company ships sailing out of London to Asia. Over the following two centuries the British East India Company took on many Luso-Asian Lascars and in the nineteenth century Luso-Asians from British India and Portuguese India were important crew on British steam ship lines including the British India Steam Navigation Company and P&O. Today the majority of the people of Luso-Asian origin in Britain are of Goan origin, who arrived in the period from 1964 to 1990 and part of a larger British Asian minority. Goans in the United Kingdom came from Aden, East Africa, the Persian Gulf, and from India. The Konkani-speaking Goan community in the English town of Swindon, were contracted directly from Goa specifically for the nearby motor-manufacturing industry in the 1990s. There are few Hong Kong-born Macanese living in U.K. before the handover of Hong Kong to China in 1997.

Famous Luso-Asians in the United Kingdom include:

- Keith Vaz (1965–) Born in Aden (Yemen) of Goan parents. British Politician.
- Claire Coryl Julia Coutinho (1985–) Born in London of parents of Goan Christian descent. British politician.

== Luso-Asians in the Americas ==
=== Luso-Asians in Brazil ===
Luso-Asians from Macau and Hong Kong emigrated mainly to the state of São Paulo and Rio de Janeiro. With the exception of a few families in Amazonas, Pernambuco and Minas Gerais, the cities of São Paulo and Rio de Janeiro account for the majority of settlement of Luso-Asians. Another group of Luso-Asians arrived between the 16th and mid-17th centuries, when the most important parts of the Portuguese Empire were their colonies in India. These included Diu, Daman, Bombay, Thana, Goa, Cochin and some smaller settlements in Hugli River. Later as the settlement of coastal Brazil developed, many governors, Catholic clerics, and soldiers who had formally served in Asia arrived with their Asian wives, concubines, servants and slaves. later Luso-Indian servants and clerics connected with the religious orders, such as the Jesuits and Franciscans and spice cultivators arrived in Brazil. In the eighteenth century there were Luso-Indians arriving in Brazil on ships of the English East India Company. Other people of Luso-Indian Origin migrated to that country from various former African Portuguese colonies (especially Mozambique), soon after their independence in the 1970s.

=== Luso-Asians in Canada ===
Luso-Asian sailors known as Lascars first probably arrived in Canada in the sixteenth century on Portuguese vessels and in the seventeenth century on British vessels in the Maritime Provinces. Research in British Columbia suggests that Luso-Asian and Hispano-Asian (i.e. Filipino) Lascars arrived on the Pacific coast of Canada in the late eighteenth century.

During the First World War Goan crewmen served as volunteers on the ships of the Canadian Pacific Railway that were seconded by the British Admiralty as Armed Merchant Vessels and performed troop transport duties in the Indian Ocean. There are Luso-Asian communities in Canada today in the form of Catholic and Hindu Goans. The Goans are considered part of the Indo-Canadian population and the majority hail from East Africa. Though there are older communities from Pakistan. Most Goans live in the Greater Toronto Area, with smaller communities in Montreal, Calgary, Edmonton and Vancouver. There are some Goans from Pakistan and a few from Britain and oil-rich states of Western Asia.

British Columbia and Ontario, followed by Alberta and Quebec were the most popular destinations for Luso-Asian immigrants from both Macau and Hong Kong. There is a small Macanese community in the Vancouver area and at Toronto and Ottawa.

=== Luso-Asians in United States ===
Luso-Asians in the United States are part of a larger Indian-American community. Despite their Portuguese, British, French or Dutch passports, Luso-Asians, like other Asians were excluded from entry to the continental USA by the Immigration Act of 1924. The act also banned the entrance of Arabs. The Naturalization Act of 1790 and 1890 also made it impossible for Asians, including Eurasians from becoming US Citizens. These laws remained in place until the Immigration and Nationality Act of 1965. As a result, the majority of Luso-Asians migrated to the United States in the later half of the twentieth century. The main destination of Macanese from Macau and Hong Kong has been California, followed by Hawaii, Washington, Oregon, Florida and New York states. The cities of San Francisco and Los Angeles are the primary centres of Macanese culture in the USA.

Famous Luso-Asians in the Americas include:

Ladis da Silva (1920-1994). Born in Zanzibar in a family haling from Chandor, Goa. Ladis was a writer, author and artist in Toronto, Ontario, Canada.

== Luso-Asians in Australia ==
Research suggests that Luso-Asians were leaders in the creation of the Indian and Indonesian Union of Seamen in Australia. Today there are Luso-Asian communities in many Australian cities, including people of Goan, Sri Lankan, Macanese, Timorese and Kristang origin. There is a large Timorese community in Darwin. Many of the Anglo-Indians of Melbourne also have Luso-Asian ancestry.

Most Luso-Asians from Macau and Hong Kong settled in New South Wales, with a smaller number in Queensland. Sydney and Canberra appear to be the primary destinations.
