= Bengali Portuguese Creole =

Extinct Portuguese creole of the Bengal delta

Bengali-Portuguese Creole
- Crioulo português bengali
- Native to: India, Bangladesh
- Region: Bengal delta: Hooghly, Chittagong, Dhaka, Calcutta, Midnapore
- Extinct: c. 1911; Formerly spoken by Luso-Asian (Feringhi) communities and local Catholic converts
- Language family: Portuguese Creole: Indo-Portuguese creole; Gauro-Portuguese; Bengali and Portuguese; Bengali-Portuguese Creole
- Early form: West African Pidgin Portuguese
- Dialects: Calcutta Creole Portuguese; Dacca Creole Portuguese; Chittagong Creole Portuguese; Hooghly Creole Portuguese
- Writing system: Latin script (Portuguese orthography)

Language codes
- ISO 639-3: None (mis)
- Linguist List: qch
- Glottolog: None

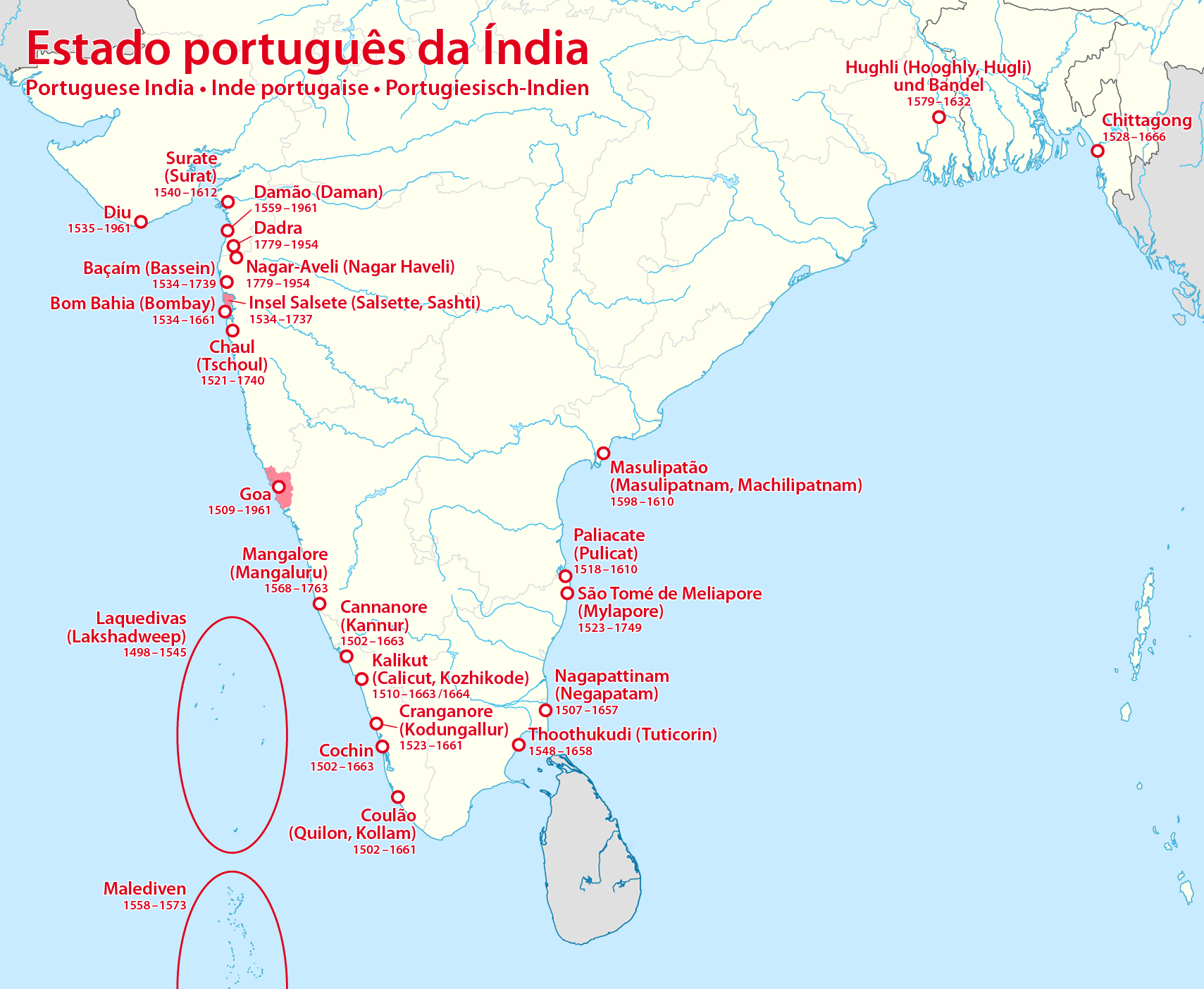
Map of Portuguese India, showing settlements across the subcontinent including those in Bengal

Bengali-Portuguese Creole (Portuguese: Crioulo português bengali) was an Indo-Portuguese creole that developed in the Bengal delta from the 16th-century onward through prolonged contact between the Portuguese and Bengali. It was spoken across the principal urban centres and riverine ports of the region, including Calcutta, Dacca, Balasore, Pipli, Chandernagore, Chittagong, Midnapore, and Hooghly. Its speakers were primarily Luso-Asians, individuals of mixed Portuguese and Bengali descent known locally as Feringhis, as well as local Roman Catholic converts. More than a community vernacular, the language served as a pivotal lingua franca for trade, diplomacy, and religious proselytisation across the Bay of Bengal for over two centuries.

Bengali-Portuguese Creole is now extinct, with its functional disappearance generally dated to the early decades of the twentieth century; 1911 is often cited as the approximate terminus of active use in the region. The pioneering creolist Hugo Schuchardt grouped the creoles of this region under the heading "Gauro-Portuguese," a sub-branch of Indo-Portuguese creoles found in the Indo-Aryan-majority areas of northern India and the Bay of Bengal littoral.

== Historical background ==
=== Portuguese arrival in Bengal (1514–1580) ===
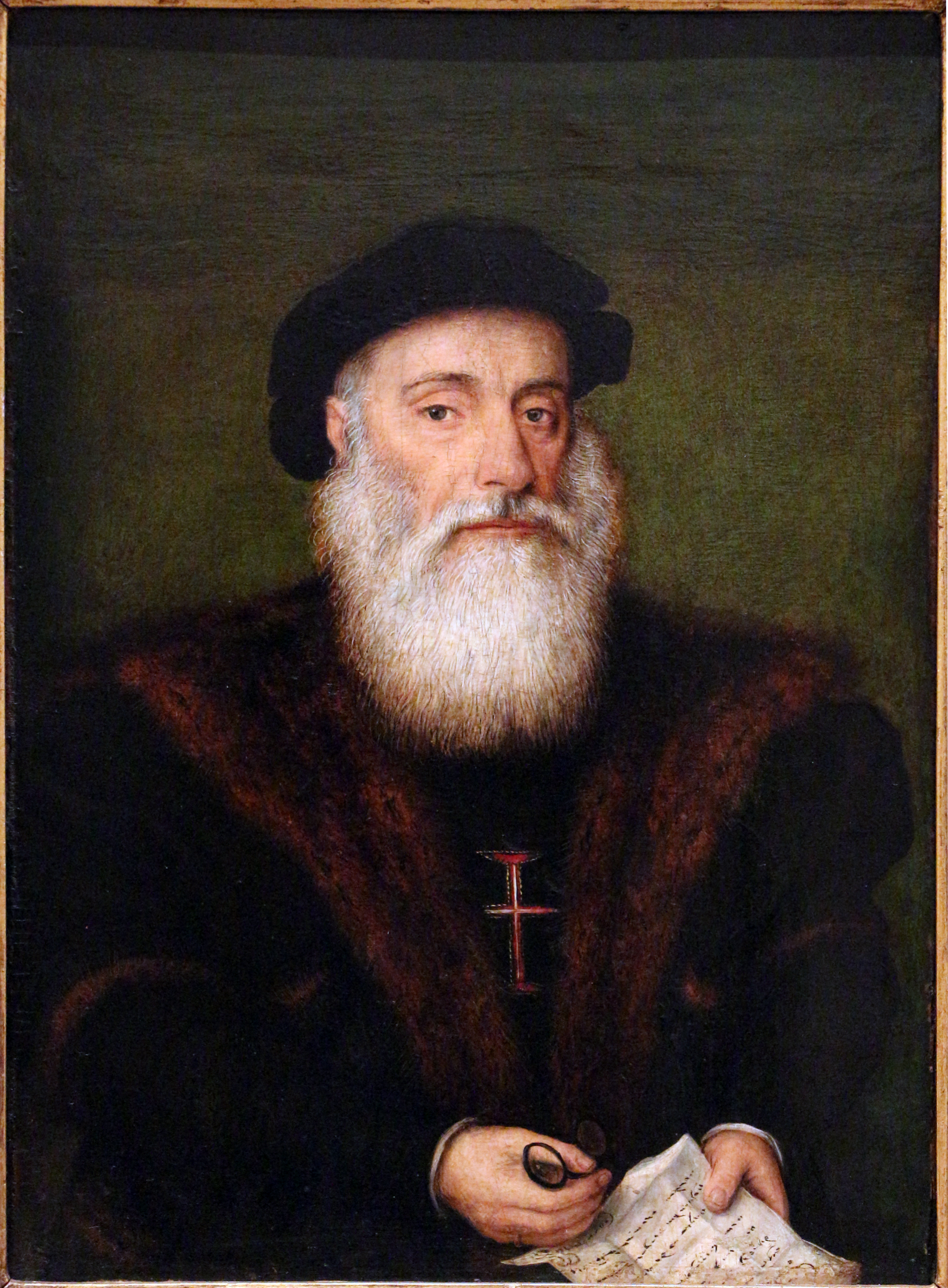
Portrait traditionally identified as Vasco da Gama, whose 1498 voyage to Calicut opened the Indian Ocean to Portuguese expansion

The conditions for the emergence of Bengali-Portuguese Creole were set by Vasco da Gama's arrival in Calicut in 1498, which opened the Indian Ocean to sustained European maritime navigation. Drawn by the Bengal region's wealth in muslin textiles, spices, and agricultural surplus, the Portuguese rapidly pushed eastward. By 1514 they had founded their earliest settlement on the Gulf of Bengal at Pipli in modern-day Odisha, which served as both harbour and commercial outpost.

The first official Portuguese emissary to the region, João da Silveira, reached the Bay of Bengal in 1517 on the instructions of Lopo Soares de Albergaria, the Governor of Portuguese India, anchoring first in Arakan before proceeding to Chittagong. During the reign of Sultan Ghiyasuddin Mahmud Shah in 1536–1537, the Portuguese were granted formal permission to construct factories and establish custom houses in both Chittagong and Satgaon. Chittagong, the principal seaport of the Bengal Sultanate, was designated by the Portuguese as Porto Grande ("the Grand Harbour"), while Satgaon, and later the adjacent settlement of Hooghly, became known as Porto Pequeno ("the Little Haven").

Principal Portuguese settlements in Bengal
Settlement	Portuguese designation	Established	Modern location	Primary function
Pipli	—	c. 1514	Odisha, India	Harbour, commercial outpost
Chittagong	Porto Grande	1528	Chittagong, Bangladesh	Seaport, trade
Satgaon	Porto Pequeno	1536	Hooghly district, India	Trade, customs
Hooghly	Porto Pequeno	1579	Hooghly district, India	Colony, ecclesiastical centre
Bandel	—	1599	Hooghly district, India	Augustinian monastery
Dacca	—	17th century	Dhaka, Bangladesh	Trade, settlement
Sandwip	—	1609–1616	Chittagong Division, Bangladesh	Independent fiefdom

=== Hooghly colony and intermarriage policy ===
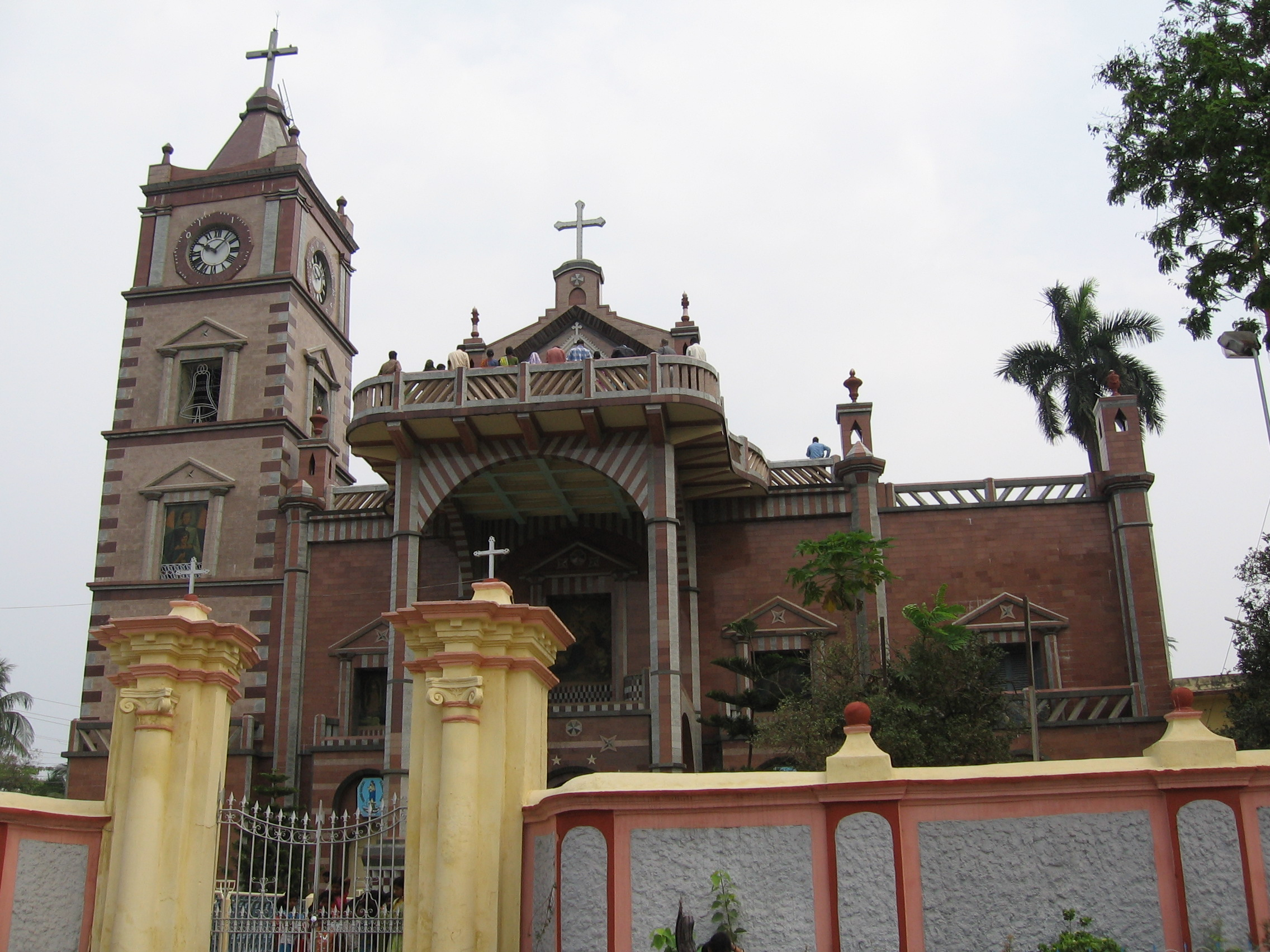
The Bandel Basilica in Hooghly district, originally built as an Augustinian monastery in 1599

In 1579 the Portuguese merchant and diplomat Pedro Tavares secured a farman (imperial decree) from the Mughal Emperor Akbar, granting the Portuguese permission to establish a permanent colony at Hooghly. The decree conferred remarkable autonomy, including religious liberty and the right to build churches. The monumental Augustinian monastery at Bandel, a toponym derived through the Portuguese corruption of the Persian and Bengali word bandar ("port"), was erected in 1599, establishing the area as the ecclesiastical and administrative nexus for the Portuguese in western Bengal.

The sociolinguistic landscape of the delta owed much to Portuguese demographic policy. Unable to populate a global empire with European-born settlers (Reinóis) alone, the Crown actively promoted intermarriage between Portuguese men and local Indian women, a practice first championed by Afonso de Albuquerque in Goa as a means of cultivating a rooted Catholic population. The children of these unions, known as Mestiços or Luso-Asians, came to form the demographic core of the Portuguese enterprise in Bengal, and by the early seventeenth century more than 2,500 Portuguese and Mestiços are thought to have been settled across the delta.

The local populace came to call these settlers Firingi or Feringhi, a term rooted in the Persian Farang ("Franks"), itself a Crusades-era designation for Western Europeans. Feringhi became the standard socio-ethnic label for anyone of Portuguese descent or affiliation throughout Bengal. It was in this multicultural milieu that Bengali Portuguese Creole took shape as the principal medium of daily communication among the Luso-Asian communities.

=== Siege of Hooghly (1632) ===
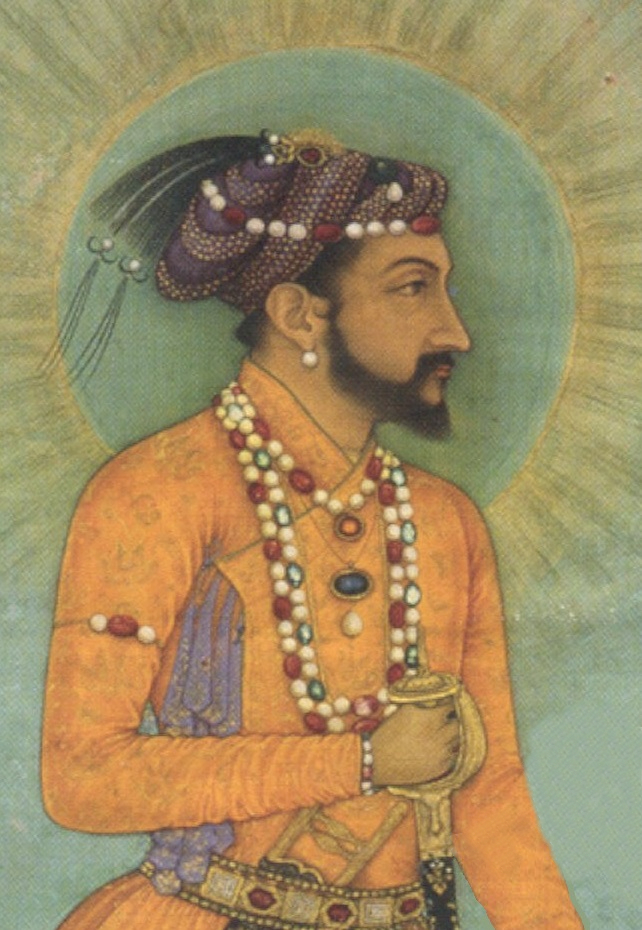
Shah Jahan, the Mughal emperor who ordered the Siege of Hooghly in 1632. Painting by Bichitr, c. 1630.

By the early seventeenth century the Portuguese had secured formidable commercial dominance over the Bay of Bengal, operating lucrative trade routes linking Bengal with Malacca, Macau, and Goa. Hooghly functioned virtually as an independent polity, exacting duties from native vessels, maintaining an independent judiciary, and supporting a heavily armed militia, which generated severe friction with the increasingly centralised Mughal Empire.

The break came in 1632, when Emperor Shah Jahan ordered Qasim Khan, the Mughal Governor of Bengal, to besiege Hooghly. The official Mughal casus belli cited the unauthorised Portuguese fortification of Hooghly, the usurpation of the ancient trade of Satgaon, aggressive proselytisation, and, most critically, alleged complicity with the Magh (Arakanese) and Feringhi pirates in operating a slave trade throughout the delta.

The Siege of Hooghly, lasting from 24 June to 15 September 1632, ended in the sacking of the settlement and the burning of the Augustinian convent. Some 10,000 Portuguese and local allies were killed, drowned, or taken prisoner, and approximately 4,000 captive Christians were marched to Agra. The Portuguese were permitted to return in 1633 and received 777 bighas of rent-free land for rebuilding at Bandel, but their absolute commercial and political hegemony in western Bengal had been broken, clearing the way for the rise of the Dutch and the British.

=== The frontier: piracy, Sandwip, and Arakan ===
While Hooghly represented the formalised mercantile face of the Portuguese presence, the southeastern delta, encompassing Chittagong, the Sundarbans, and the Kingdom of Arakan, was characterised by a chaotic, frontier dynamic constituting what historians have termed the "shadow empire", an informal, highly militarised network of Luso-Asian adventurers, mercenaries, and outlaws operating entirely outside the jurisdiction of the Estado da Índia in Goa.

The most remarkable figure of this era was Sebastião Gonsalves Tibau, who arrived in India in 1605 and rose from salt trader to self-styled sovereign. Commanding a flotilla of heavily armed shallow-draft vessels, Tibau seized the strategic island of Sandwip in 1609 and governed it as an independent potentate for nearly a decade until his overthrow in 1616 by a combined Dutch and Arakanese fleet.

After the fall of Sandwip the Feringhi population was absorbed into the military apparatus of the Arakanese kingdom. The Kings of Arakan settled thousands of Portuguese descendants at Dianga near Chittagong, employing them as a naval vanguard; joint Magh and Feringhi squadrons subsequently conducted slave raids deep into the waterways of Lower Bengal.

This era of unchecked piracy came to an end in 1665 when Shaista Khan, the Mughal Viceroy of Bengal, persuaded the Feringhis to abandon the Arakanese king in exchange for imperial protection, salaries, and permanent land grants. In December of that year forty-two galleasses ferrying the entire Feringhi community of Chittagong crossed over to the Mughal lines at Noakhali. Stripped of their naval arm, the Arakanese were swiftly defeated and Chittagong passed into Mughal hands in 1666. Shaista Khan subsequently settled the Luso-Asians on estates near Dhaka and Chittagong, in areas that retain the name Firingi Bazar to the present day.

== Linguistic characteristics ==
=== Origins and creolisation ===
Bengali Portuguese Creole illustrates a classic trajectory in contact linguistics, tracing the shift from a practical pidgin to a fully nativised creole. According to the monogenetic theory of creole formation, a highly mobile maritime pidgin, often referred to as West African Pidgin Portuguese, originated around the Portuguese forts on the West African coast in the fifteenth century and was diffused throughout the Indian Ocean by sailors, merchants, and African slaves.

On reaching the Bay of Bengal, this pidgin entered into sustained contact with the indigenous languages of the region, above all Bengali, with additional input from Arabic, Persian, and various regional dialects. As the Mestiço population grew in settlements such as Hooghly, Dhaka, and Chittagong, the children of Portuguese-Bengali unions took up the evolving contact language as their mother tongue, thereby completing the process of creolization in which a restricted pidgin gains native speakers and develops the grammatical resources needed for the full range of human expression.

In the resulting creole, Portuguese functioned as the superstrate (or lexifier) language, providing the vast majority of the vocabulary, while Bengali and other regional languages served as the substrate, heavily influencing the syntax, phonology, and semantic structures.

=== Morphosyntax ===
Comparison of morphosyntactic features
Feature	Standard European Portuguese	Bengali Portuguese Creole
Verbal conjugation	Complex inflection for tense, mood, aspect, and person	Invariant bare verb stem with pre-verbal TMA particles
Grammatical gender	Obligatory two-gender system (masculine/feminine)	Largely absent; retained only for natural biological gender
Noun pluralisation	Suffixal inflection (e.g., -s, -es)	Generic plural marker or reduplication
Word order	Relatively flexible (SVO predominant)	Rigid, analytically determined
Copula	Inflected ser / estar	Simplified or zero copula

Standard European Portuguese is a highly inflected language featuring complex verbal conjugations, grammatical gender, and number agreement. Bengali Portuguese Creole, by contrast, displayed the hallmarks typical of creolisation, notably morphological simplification, rigid syntax, and phonetic adaptation. The verbal system was restructured to employ an invariant, bare verb stem, typically derived from the Portuguese infinitive or third-person singular present form, with tense, mood, and aspect (TMA) indicated by pre-verbal free morphemes (particles). This structural logic was heavily influenced by the substrate languages and general creolisation processes. Nouns shed grammatical gender except where natural sex required it, and pluralisation was probably marked by a generic particle or by reduplication, a device shared by many South Asian languages and creole systems alike.

=== Phonology ===
The phonetic inventory of Bengali Portuguese Creole occupied a middle ground between the phonologies of Portuguese and Bengali. Bengali lacks several fricative consonants found in European Portuguese (notably /v/ and /f/), a gap that produced systematic consonant shifts in which Portuguese /v/ was typically realised as /b/ or /bʱ/. The rich system of nasal vowels inherent in Portuguese was readily accommodated, as Bengali also features a robust system of phonemic vowel nasalisation.

== Portuguese as a lingua franca in Bengal ==
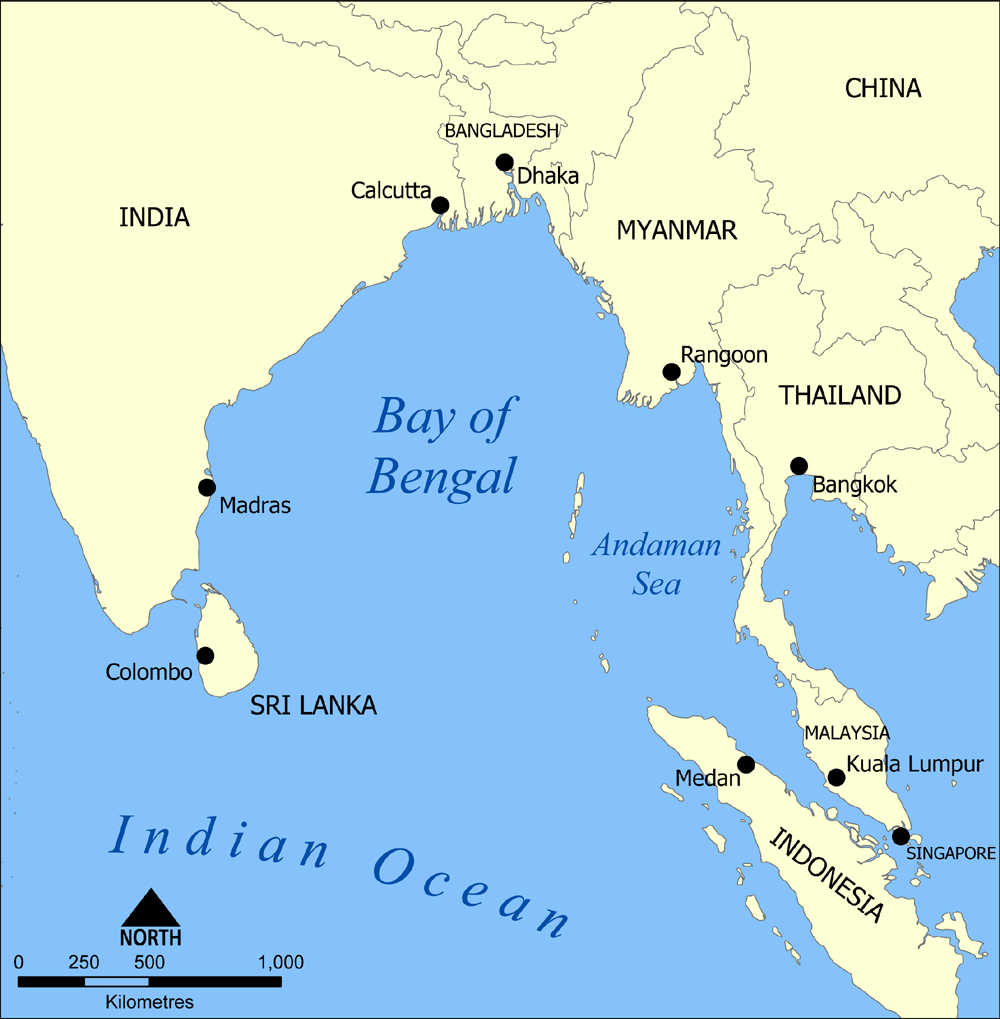
Map of the Bay of Bengal, the maritime theatre across which Portuguese served as the dominant lingua franca for over two centuries

Bengali Portuguese Creole was far more than a localised community language. From the late sixteenth century well into the late eighteenth century, Portuguese, frequently in its creolised or pidginised forms, served as the undisputed lingua franca of the Bay of Bengal and the wider Indian Ocean commercial network.

So entrenched was Portuguese that successive European arrivals, among them the Dutch Vereenigde Oostindische Compagnie (VOC), the British East India Company (EIC), and the French, found themselves obliged to use it when conducting business, treating with local rulers, and communicating with domestic staff. Historical records indicate that the EIC actively maintained a repository of over two hundred Portuguese dictionaries and employed numerous interpreters.

Documented use of Portuguese by non-Portuguese entities in Bengal
Entity	Period	Usage
British East India Company	17th to 18th centuries	Company charter required ministers at superior factories to acquire Portuguese within one year of arrival in India
Robert Clive	1757	Reportedly spoke no Indian languages but commanded native sepoy troops in Portuguese
John Zachariah Kiernander	1780	Founded the Old Mission Church in Calcutta; delivered sermons in Portuguese to reach local Christian congregations
Danish Governor of Serampore	1828	Still receiving the daily report of his native garrison in Portuguese
Protestant missionaries	Early 19th century	Delivered sermons and published religious literature in Portuguese for local congregations

== Manuel da Assumpção and the birth of Bengali prose ==
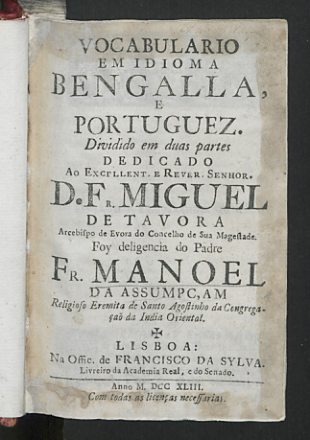
Title page of Manuel da Assumpção's Vocabulario em idioma Bengalla, e Portuguez (1743), the earliest bilingual Bengali–Portuguese lexicon

The single most important primary source for the linguistic reality of Luso-Bengali contact is the work of Manuel da Assumpção, a Portuguese Augustinian missionary stationed in the Bhawal Estate near Dhaka. Assumpção compiled the Vocabulario em idioma Bengalla, e Portuguez dividido em dous tomos, the earliest bilingual Bengali–Portuguese grammar and lexicon, published in Lisbon in 1743. He also composed a dialogue apology of Christianity titled Crepar Xaxtrer Orth, Bhed (The Difference Between the True and False Scriptures), published in 1735.

These works hold exceptional importance not only for Bengali lexicography but also for creolistics and for the early history of Bengali prose. Assumpção's transcriptions of Bengali in Roman script preserve the phonetic contours of eighteenth-century dialects and capture the Portuguese vocabulary then in active circulation within Bengali. His texts demonstrate that by the mid-eighteenth century, a standardised "Christian Bengali" dialect, heavily influenced by Portuguese syntax and vocabulary, had emerged as the primary medium for Christian worship and literature among native converts and Luso-Asians. Assumpção's grammatical framework predated the work of later British orientalists, notably Nathaniel Brassey Halhed and William Carey, by several decades, contrasting with their subsequent Sanskrit-centric approaches.

== Extinction ==
The fate of Bengali Portuguese Creole was bound to the political fortunes of the Portuguese Empire in the East. After the Battle of Plassey in 1757, British political control in Bengal hardened and English steadily displaced Portuguese as the language of administration, trade, and social prestige. For the Luso-Asian population, attachment to the creole brought increasing socioeconomic marginalisation under British rule, and parents began to abandon it in favour of English as the language of advancement.

By the late nineteenth century the creole survived only as a domestic relic among the oldest generation. It is generally held to have crossed the threshold into complete extinction in the early decades of the twentieth century, with 1911 commonly cited as the end of active use.

== Lexical legacy ==
Although Bengali Portuguese Creole itself is extinct, its imprint survives in the modern Bengali lexicon and in cognate Indo-Aryan languages such as Assamese, Odia, and Hindustani. As the principal agents for introducing Western European technologies, administrative practices, and New World flora to the subcontinent, the Portuguese bequeathed hundreds of loanwords to the indigenous languages. These terms were reshaped through phonological integration to fit local patterns, yet retain their distinctly Lusitanian etymology.

=== Household items and architecture ===
Portuguese loanwords: household items and architecture
Portuguese etymon	Modern Bengali	Assamese	Odia	Hindustani	English
armário	আলমারি almari	almari	—	almari	wardrobe, cabinet
chave	চাবি chabi	sabi	chabi	chabi	key
janela	জানালা janala	janalanga	—	janela	window
mesa	মেজ mej	mej	mej	mez	table
balde	বালতি balti	—	—	balti	bucket
prego	পেরেক perek	—	—	preg	nail
estirar	ইস্ত্রি istri	istri	istri	istri	to iron (clothes)
sabão	সাবান saban	saban	sabun	sabun	soap
toalha	তোয়ালে toale	—	—	tauliya	towel
gamela	গামলা gamla	—	—	—	tub, basin
varanda	বারান্দা baranda	baranda	—	baramada	verandah

=== Clothing and personal adornment ===
Portuguese loanwords: clothing and personal adornment
Portuguese etymon	Modern Bengali	Assamese	Odia	Hindustani	English
fita	ফিতা fita	phita	phita	fita	ribbon
alfinete	আলপিন alpin	alpin	—	alpin	pin
botão	বোতাম botam	—	—	botam	button
saia	সায়া saya	saya	—	saya	petticoat, skirt

=== Food, flora, and agriculture ===
The Portuguese were instrumental in introducing New World crops from the Americas and Africa to the Bengal delta, fundamentally altering the regional diet and agricultural economy.

Portuguese loanwords: food, flora, and agriculture
Portuguese etymon	Modern Bengali	Assamese	Odia	Hindustani	English
ananás	আনারস anaras	—	anaras	ananas	pineapple
ata	আতা ata	atlas	ata	at	custard apple
caju	কাজু kaju	—	—	—	cashew
papaia	পেঁপে pepe	—	papaya	papaya	papaya
couve	কপি kopi	—	kobi	kobi	cabbage
biscoito	বিস্কুট biskut	—	—	biskut	biscuit
pão	পাউরুটি pauruti	—	—	pao-roti	bread
tabaco	তামাক tamak	—	tamakhu	tambaku	tobacco
limão	লেবু lebu	lemu	lemu	limu	lemon
salada	সালাদ salad (Note: It is more likely that সালাদ is a loan from English 'salad' instead of Portuguese 'salata', as they are more phonologically similar. However, the Hindustani word does show greater similarity to the Portuguese word.)	—	—	salata	salad

Beyond the lexicon, the Portuguese introduced numerous New World plant species to the Indian subcontinent, including Agave americana (century plant), Anacardium occidentale (cashew nut), Arachis hypogaea (peanut, sometimes called groundnut), Carica papaya (papaya or pawpaw), Ipomoea batatas (sweet potato), Nicotiana tabacum (tobacco), and Psidium guajava (guava). Ornamental introductions such as Plumeria (frangipani) and Mirabilis jalapa (four o'clock flower) also transformed the aesthetics of Bengali gardens.

=== Religious, maritime, and administrative terms ===
Portuguese loanwords: religious, maritime, and administrative terminology
Portuguese etymon	Modern Bengali	Assamese	Odia	Hindustani	English
igreja	গির্জা girja	girja	girja	girja	church
padre	পাদ্রি padri	—	—	padri	priest
leilão	নিলাম nilam	lilam	nilam	nilam	auction
mestre	মিস্ত্রি mistri	mistri	—	mistri	master workman
mastro	মাস্তুল mastul	mastul	mastul	mastul	mast

== Cultural legacy ==
=== Culinary syncretism ===
The notion of a "Creole Bengal" reaches well beyond linguistic borrowing into a deeper, centuries-long process of cultural hybridisation. Its most celebrated expression lies in the Bengali culinary tradition. Before the Portuguese arrived, orthodox Hindu dietary convention forbade the deliberate curdling of milk with acid, regarding split milk as ritually impure. The Portuguese, heirs to a long tradition of cheese-making, introduced the technique of acid-curdling milk to produce fresh cheese, known locally as chhana.

Local confectioners (moiras) quickly took up chhana production, marrying it with indigenous sugars and flavourings to create what would become iconic Bengali sweets, among them sandesh and rosogolla. Though collective memory tends to place the invention of the rosogolla in nineteenth-century Calcutta, the sweet is in effect the culmination of a creolising process that began centuries earlier in the Portuguese enclaves of the Hooghly district.

=== Notable Luso-Indian figures ===
Antony Firingee
- Born: Hensman Anthony; 1786; Chandernagore, Bengal
- Died: 1836 (aged 49–50)
- Occupation: Kabiwala (folk poet)
- Known for: Integration into Bengali Hindu cultural life; patronage of the Firinghi Kali Temple

Religious and cultural syncretism took striking forms, blurring the boundaries between the European Christian and indigenous Hindu worlds. Perhaps the most vivid example is Hensman Anthony, known as Anthony Firingi (1786–1836), a man of Portuguese descent from Chandernagore who immersed himself wholly in Bengali culture. Anthony married a Hindu Brahmin widow named Saudamini, adopted Hindu customs, and became a celebrated Kabiwala, a composer and singer of extempore Bengali folk poetry. He composed devotional songs to the Hindu goddesses Kali and Durga, engaged in legendary musical duels (kobigaan) with rival poets such as Bhola Moira, and patronised a Kali temple in the Bowbazar district of North Calcutta, which remains active today as the Firinghi Kali-bari ("the Portuguese home of Kali").

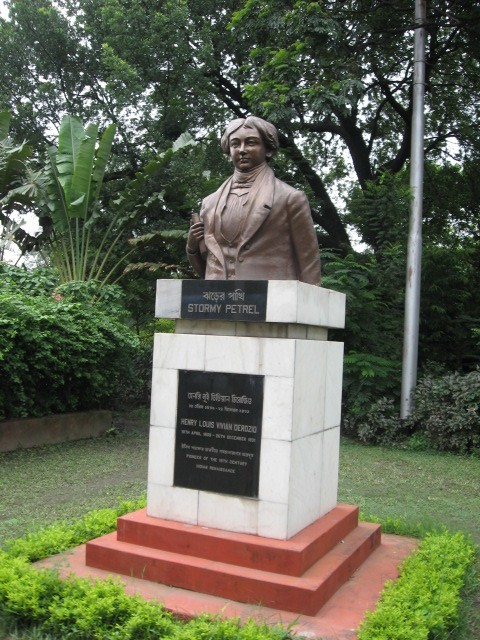
Statue of Henry Louis Vivian Derozio in Kolkata

The Luso-Indian community also gave rise to Henry Louis Vivian Derozio (1809–1831), born in Calcutta to a family of Portuguese extraction. Named a professor at Hindu College at just seventeen, Derozio became the intellectual spark behind the Young Bengal movement, infusing his students with the ideals of rationalism, free thought, and liberal humanism. As a poet, he blended Western Romantic forms with rich Oriental imagery in works such as The Fakeer of Jungheera. His death from cholera at twenty-two cut short a remarkable career, yet Derozio's standing as a foundational figure of the Bengal Renaissance and one of modern India's earliest nationalist poets assures the Luso-Indian community an enduring place in the country's intellectual history.

== Descendant communities ==
=== Feringhis of eastern Bengal ===
In present-day Bangladesh, the descendants of the Portuguese settlers and their converts are collectively known as the Kala Feringhis or Matti Feringhis ("Earth Feringhis"). These communities, numbering in the thousands in the mid-nineteenth century, were concentrated in Noakhali, Chittagong, and the Bakarganj district. Augustinian mission records from 1750 indicate pastoral oversight of thousands of public and "occult" (clandestine) Christians in eastern Bengal.

The Feringhis of Chittagong and Bakarganj today, among them the more than 800 parishioners of the Portuguese Church of Shibpur, represent a distinctive ethno-religious synthesis. Ethnically and linguistically, they have assimilated almost entirely into Bengali mainstream life, speaking regional dialects, working the land, and wearing local dress. Yet they retain their Catholic faith, adherence to the Catholic liturgical calendar, and Portuguese surnames including De Barros, Fernandez, De Souza, D'Costa, and Gonsalvez.

=== Christian settlement of Mirpur (West Bengal) ===
A localised survival of Luso-Indian identity exists in the village of Mirpur, near Geonkhali in the Purba Medinipur district of West Bengal, known colloquially as Christianpalli ("the Christian village") or Firingipara.

According to regional historical documentation and oral tradition, Mirpur was established in the latter half of the eighteenth century when the Raja of Mahishadal, facing incursions from Maratha cavalry (the Bargis), recruited Portuguese artillerymen from Chittagong. In recognition of their military service, the Raja granted these mercenaries rent-free lands. Today, Mirpur is home to approximately 140 Christian families who trace their lineage directly to these Portuguese gunners.

The residents of Mirpur speak standard Bengali with full fluency and retain no active knowledge of Portuguese or its creolised variant, yet their Portuguese heritage lives on in their nomenclature. Census studies have documented the phonetic adaptation of surnames across the generations.

Documented surname transformations in the Mirpur community
Original Portuguese surname	Adapted form	Adaptation type
Correia	Currie	Anglicised
Leal	Lea	Anglicised
Silva	Silver	English translation
Rocha	Rotha	Phonetic adaptation to Bengali
Teixeira	Tesra	Phonetic adaptation to Bengali
Pereira	Johnson	Complete replacement
Gomes	Fitzpatrick	Complete replacement

Despite the loss of the creole and full integration into the local agrarian economy, the Mirpur community retains a living awareness of its Luso-Asian heritage.

== See also ==
- Portuguese-based creole languages
- Indo-Portuguese creoles
- Luso-Asians
- Portuguese settlement in Chittagong
- Anthony Firingi
- Henry Louis Vivian Derozio
- Siege of Hooghly
- Feringhee
- Firingi Bazar
