= Pseuderemias septemstriata =

Scientific classification
- Domain: Eukaryota
- Kingdom: Animalia
- Phylum: Chordata
- Class: Reptilia
- Order: Squamata
- Family: Lacertidae
- Genus: Pseuderemias
- Species: P. septemstriata

Binomial name
- Pseuderemias septemstriata (Parker, 1942)

Species of lizard

Pseuderemias septemstriata is a species of lizard endemic to Somalia.
