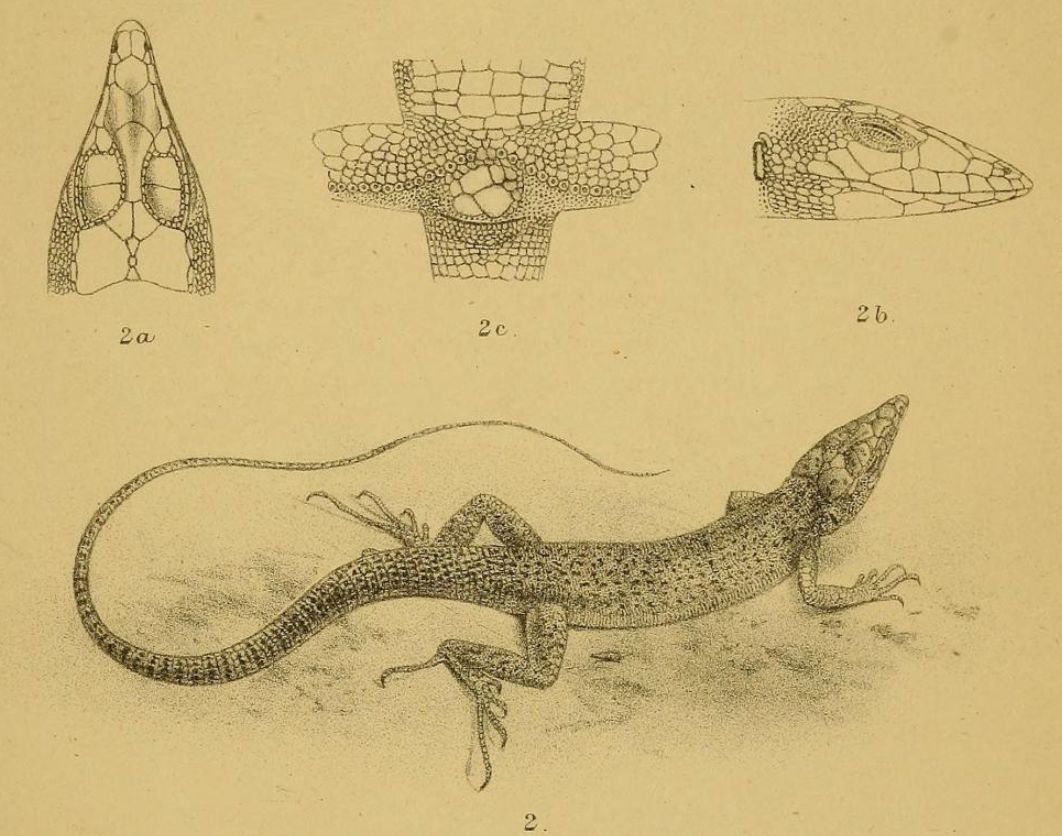

Scientific classification
- Domain: Eukaryota
- Kingdom: Animalia
- Phylum: Chordata
- Class: Reptilia
- Order: Squamata
- Family: Lacertidae
- Genus: Pseuderemias
- Species: P. erythrosticta

Binomial name
- Pseuderemias erythrosticta (Boulenger, 1891)

= Pseuderemias erythrosticta =

Species of lizard

Pseuderemias erythrosticta, Boulenger's racerunner, is a species of lizard endemic to Somalia.
