= Short racer =

Conservation status
- Least Concern (IUCN 3.1)

Scientific classification
- Kingdom: Animalia
- Phylum: Chordata
- Class: Reptilia
- Order: Squamata
- Suborder: Serpentes
- Family: Colubridae
- Genus: Platyceps
- Species: P. brevis

Binomial name
- Platyceps brevis (Boulenger, 1895)

Synonyms
- Zamenis brevis Boulenger, 1895; Coluber brevis — Parker, 1932; Haemorrhois brevis — Welch, 1982; Eremiophis brevis — Welch, 1983; Platyceps brevis — Schätti & Utiger, 2001

Species of snake

The short racer (Platyceps brevis), is a species of snake in the family Colubridae. The species is endemic to northeastern Africa.

== Geographic range ==
P. brevis is found in Ethiopia, Kenya, Somalia, and Tanzania.

== Subspecies ==
Two subspecies are recognized as being valid, including the nominotypical subspecies.

- Platyceps brevis brevis (Boulenger, 1895)
- Playceps brevis smithi (Boulenger, 1895)

Nota bene: A trinomial authority in parentheses indicates that the subspecies was originally described in a genus other than Platyceps.

== Reproduction ==
P. brevis is oviparous.

== Etymology ==
The subspecific name, smithi, is in honor of American physician Arthur Donaldson Smith.
