= Bayingyi people =

Ethnic group in Myanmar

Bayingyi
ဘရင်ဂျီ

Total population
- At least 3,000, up to 100,000

Regions with significant populations
- Myanmar
- Sagaing Region: c. 3,000+

Languages
- Languages of Myanmar: Burmese; Some English

Religion
- Christianity (mostly Roman Catholicism) Some Buddhism

Related ethnic groups
- Portuguese; Bamar people; Ethnic groups of Myanmar; Luso-Asians

Bayingyi people (Burmese: ဘရင်ဂျီ) also known as Luso-Burmese, are a subgroup ethnicity of Luso-Asians, and are the descendants of Portuguese mercenaries or adventurers who came to Myanmar (Burma) in the 16th and 17th centuries. They were recruited into the Royal Burmese Armed Forces' artillery and musketeers corps, and over centuries of continued settlement in the Mu Valley, particularly the Sagaing Region of Myanmar, have been more or less assimilated into the dominant ethnic group of the region, the Bamar, while keeping their sense of Portuguese identity and Roman Catholic religion.

== Etymology ==
The descendants of the Portuguese were once commonly known, because of their Caucasian features, as “Bayingyi", but the everyday usage of the term, along with the Bayingyi's European appearance, has almost disappeared due to assimilation with the Bamar. The term “Bayingyi” is derived from the Arabic expression 'Feringhi' or 'Frank', used to generally describe any western European, with the word mainly being used by Middle Eastern Muslims to describe the Christian Crusaders from Europe during the Crusades.

== History ==
=== Arrival of the Portuguese ===
A 19th-century Konbaung pennant of a Burmese artillery unit made up of European descendants.

During the 16th and 17th centuries the Royal Burmese Armed forces recruited entire corps of European and Muslim mercenaries, who used knowledge of artillery and muskets to assist the Burmese in war. By the mid-17th century, the foreign mercenaries, who had proven politically dangerous as well as expensive, had virtually disappeared in favour of cannoneers and matchlockmen in the Burmese military ahmudan system. However, the men who replaced them were themselves descendants of mercenaries who had settled in their own hereditary villages in Upper Burma (on the vast plain in Sagaing Region) where they practised their own religion (Roman Catholicism) and followed their own customs.

=== Filipe de Brito and the development of the Bayingyi identity ===
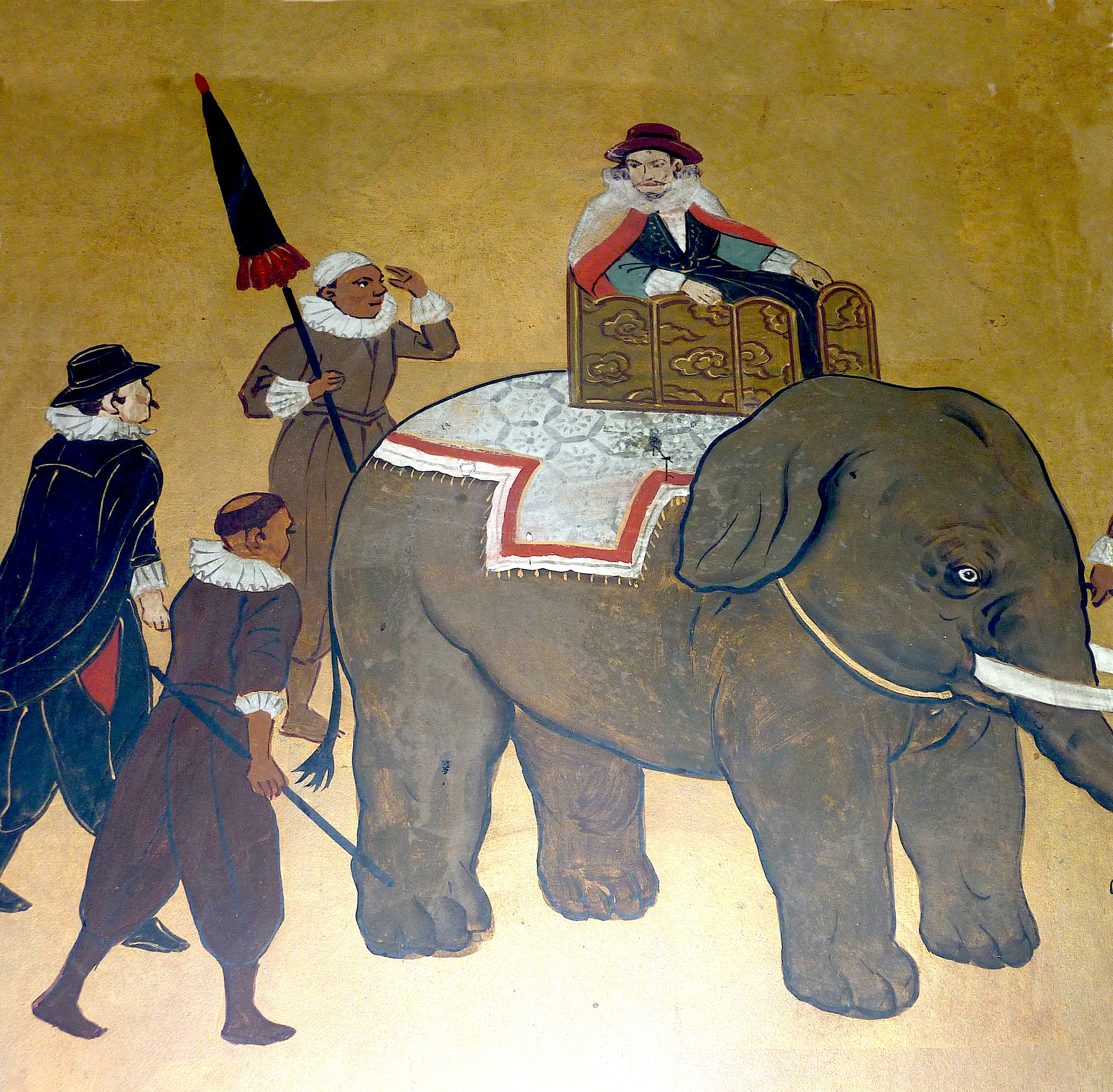
Filipe de Brito, Portuguese mercenary and governor of Syriam, Burma, circa 1600.

One of the best-known Portuguese adventurers was Filipe de Brito e Nicote, who served the Rakhine king, Min Razagyi. In 1599, De Brito was made governor of Syriam, a busy port on the Bago River in what is now Yangon's Thanlyin Township, where the ruins of the country's first Catholic church can be seen on a hilltop.

De Brito, who commanded a force of about 3,000 men, enraged the Burmese after his forces desecrated Buddha images, and in 1613 Syriam was attacked by the Taungoo dynasty king, Anaukpetlun. De Brito was captured and executed by impaling. The Portuguese community, between 4,000 and 5,000 people, was taken prisoner and marched to the Taungoo capital, Ava. Some sources say it took them 10 weeks to complete the journey.

In 1628, Anaukpetlun was succeeded by King Thalun. He encouraged the Portuguese and their mixed-race families to integrate, and gave them the land where their ancestors lived in Sagaing. Now the descendants of these Portuguese, heavily integrated both ethnically and culturally into the Bamar, live scattered across an unknown range of villages and towns in this region known as 'Anya'.

== Population ==
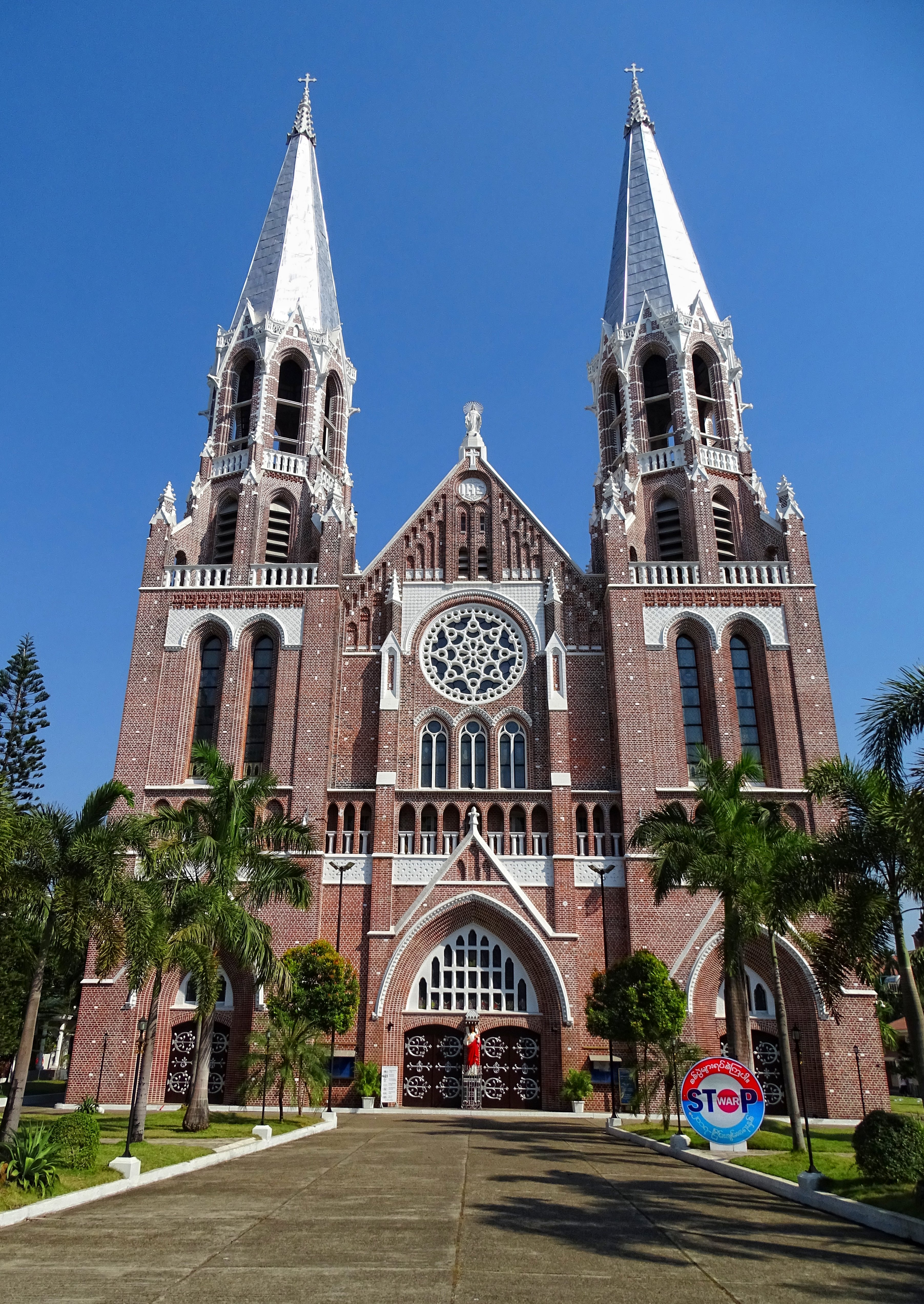
St Mary's Cathedral, a Catholic church in Yangon (formerly Rangoon), Myanmar (Burma).

An 1830 census put the population of the Bayingyi at somewhere roughly around 3,000, but many thousands more may have some Portuguese ancestry – at least 5,000 Portuguese adventurers and mercenaries came to and settled in Myanmar, and some estimate up to 100,000 Bayingyi are dispersed across the villages of the Mu Valley. Centuries of inter-marriage have left the Bayingyi more or less assimilated into the Bamar ethnic group of Myanmar, but they have still kept their sense of Portuguese identity and Roman Catholic religion, and in some individuals obvious European phenotypes are still present.

== Persecution ==
At the end of 2021 and through 2022, several Bayingyi villages in the Mu Valley were targeted by the Tatmadaw, leading to pro-democracy anti-government protests from the community. Agriculture and infrastructure was destroyed and livestock were killed. The villages were ransacked, hundreds of houses were looted and torched, with Catholic chapels also being targeted and razed. According to the International Association of Luso-Descendants (IALD) the village of Chaung Yoe was the hardest hit, and was allegedly attacked with artillery. After the attacks, only 20 of the 350 houses were left intact. The villagers were persecuted, terrorised and at least five were shot and killed while fleeing the attack, according to eyewitnesses. Several clergymen were arrested and their chapels were looted for gold and money. According to a Bayingyi eyewitness, the Catholic faith and 'foreign' traditions of his people is likely the reason for the attacks.

== See also ==
- Luso-Asians
- Luso-Indians
- Anglo-Burmese
- Portuguese people
- Ethnic groups of Myanmar
- Felipe de Brito e Nicote
- Roman Catholicism in Myanmar
