= Pseuderemias striatus =

Conservation status
- Least Concern (IUCN 3.1)

Scientific classification
- Kingdom: Animalia
- Phylum: Chordata
- Class: Reptilia
- Order: Squamata
- Suborder: Lacertoidea
- Family: Lacertidae
- Genus: Pseuderemias
- Species: P. striatus

Binomial name
- Pseuderemias striatus (Peters, 1874)

Species of lizard

Pseuderemias striatus, Peters's sand lizard or Peters's sand racer, is a species of lizard found in Kenya, Somalia, and Ethiopia.
