= Pseuderemias savagei =

Conservation status
- Least Concern (IUCN 3.1)

Scientific classification
- Kingdom: Animalia
- Phylum: Chordata
- Class: Reptilia
- Order: Squamata
- Family: Lacertidae
- Genus: Pseuderemias
- Species: P. savagei

Binomial name
- Pseuderemias savagei (Gans, Laurent & Pandit, 1965)

Synonyms
- Eremias savagei Gans, Laurent & Pandit, 1965; Pseuderemias mucronata savagei — Lanza, 1983; Pseuderemias savagei — Szczerbak, 1989

Species of lizard

Pseuderemias savagei is a species of lizard in the family Lacertidae. The species is endemic to Somalia.

== Etymology ==
Although it has been stated that the specific name, savagei, is in honor of American herpetologist Jay M. Savage, the original work thanks Francis J. Savage for his "manifold hospitality and assistance", making him the probable person honored. (Note: "This species is named in honor of Francis J. Savage, who was a USAID Foreign Service Officer stationed in Mogadishu, Somalia at the time, and invited Dr. Carl Gans to visit him in Somalia. My father was from Olean, New York and he contacted the State University of New York at Buffalo, where Dr. Gans worked at the time. Another species, Agamodon compressus was also discovered around this same time. I was a boy at the time but went collecting with Dr. Gans. Personal Observation." Signed: Ronald F. Savage Jan. 23, 2022)

== Geographic range ==
P. savagei is found in northeastern Somalia.

== Reproduction ==
P. savagei is oviparous.
