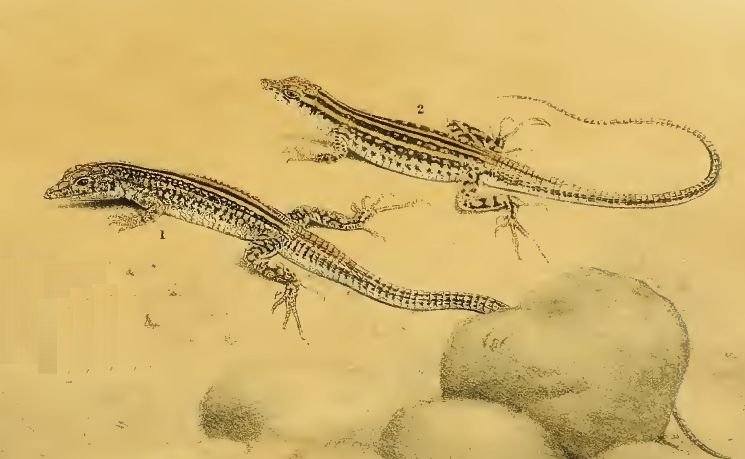

Scientific classification
- Domain: Eukaryota
- Kingdom: Animalia
- Phylum: Chordata
- Class: Reptilia
- Order: Squamata
- Family: Lacertidae
- Genus: Pseuderemias
- Species: P. mucronata

Binomial name
- Pseuderemias mucronata (Blanford, 1870)

= Pseuderemias mucronata =

Species of lizard

Pseuderemias mucronata, the Sinai racerunner or Blanford's sand racer, is a species of lizard found in Egypt, Sudan, Ethiopia, Eritrea, Djibouti, and Somalia.
