= Pseuderemias =

Scientific classification
- Kingdom: Animalia
- Phylum: Chordata
- Class: Reptilia
- Order: Squamata
- Family: Lacertidae
- Subfamily: Lacertinae
- Genus: Pseuderemias; Boettger, 1883

Species
- See text.

Genus of lizards

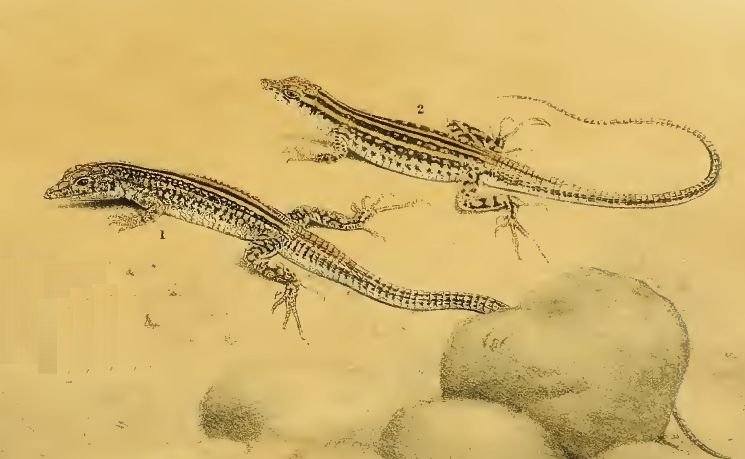
Pseuderemias mucronata. Male (1) and female (2)

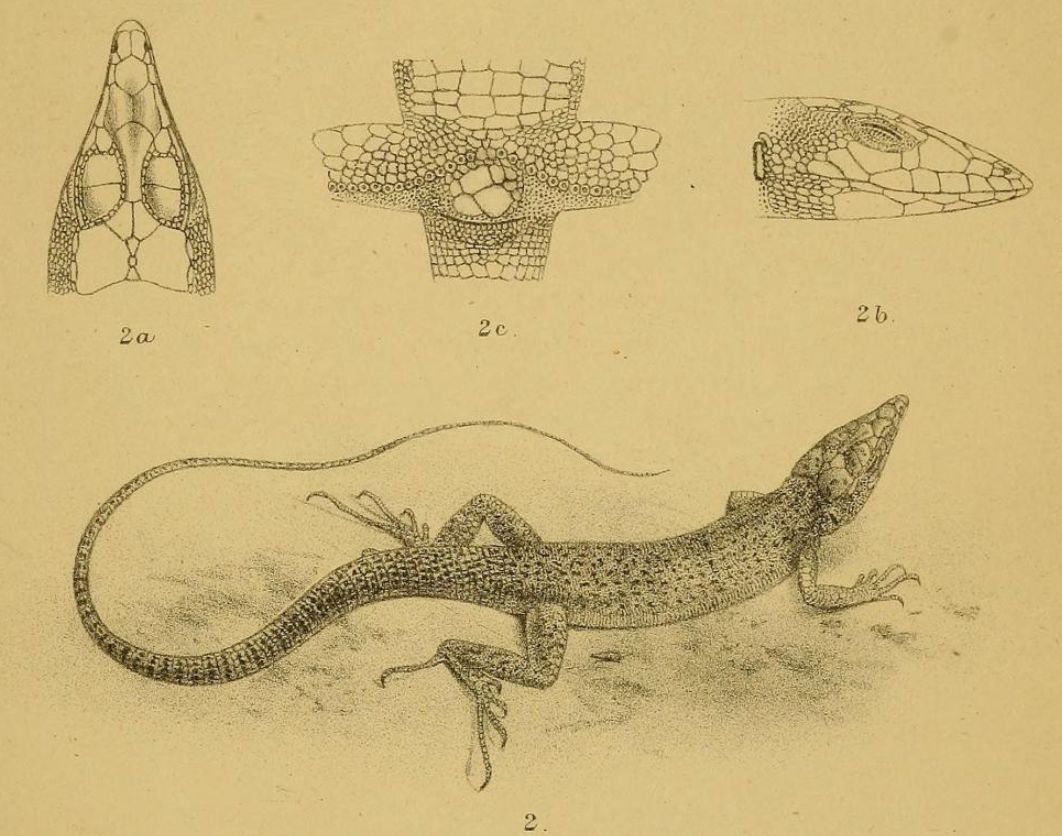
Pseuderemias erythrosticta

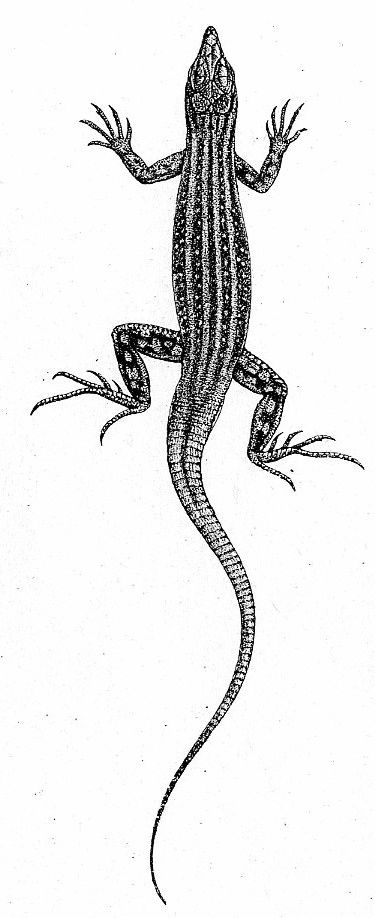
Pseuderemias smithii

Pseuderemias is a genus of lizards of the family Lacertidae. Common names for the genus are false sand lizards or racerunners.

== Distribution ==
Species of this genus are distributed from southeastern Egypt (Gebel Elba region) along coastal regions of the Red Sea in Sudan to Eritrea, eastern Ethiopia, Djibouti, Somalia and northern Kenya. The center of the diversification of this genus is Somalia.

== Diagnosis ==
Pseuderemias are small to medium-sized dorso-laterally compressed lacertids with very narrow snouts. Each nostrils is surrounded by four nasal scales and is not reached by the first supralabial. The upper head shields are smooth, rugose or pitted. The eyes have movable lids. There is no vertebral series of enlarged scales down the middle of the back, the dorsal scales are roughly homogeneous. A collar is present. The ventral scales are smooth and arranged in six to ten longitudinal rows. The toes are strongly compressed and the subdigital lamellae are keeled. The tail is long, up to three times as long as head and body. Femoral pores are present.

The ground colour is greyish or light brown to brownish red, brick red, dark brown or almost black. On the back there are usually some creme or whitish stripes and/or dots which are arranged in longitudinal lines. Some species like P. erythrosticta lack stripes and are spotted with dark dots. Hatchlings are generally more intensely striped than adults.

== Habitat and natural history ==
Only one species (P. mucronata) reaches north to Egypt and inhabits along the Red Sea coastal dunes and sandy plains with fairly good vegetation cover. Other species are distributed in low-lying, arid Somali-Masai Acacia-Commiphora deciduous bushland and semi-desert shrubland vegetation in eastern Africa.

Little is known of the natural history of Pseuderemias species. They are small diurnal, active, terrestrial lacertids that feed on small insects and other arthropods and lay eggs.

== Species ==
Seven species are recognized.

- Pseuderemias brenneri (W. Peters, 1869) – Brenner's racerunner, Brenner's sand racer
- Pseuderemias erythrosticta (Boulenger, 1892) – Boulenger's racerunner
- Pseuderemias mucronata (Blanford, 1870) – Sinai racerunner, Blanford's sand racer
- Pseuderemias savagei (Gans, Laurent & Pandit, 1965)
- Pseuderemias septemstriata (Parker, 1942)
- Pseuderemias smithii (Boulenger, 1895) – Smith's racerunner, Smith's sand racer
- Pseuderemias striatus (W. Peters, 1874) – Peters's sand lizard, Peters's sand racer
