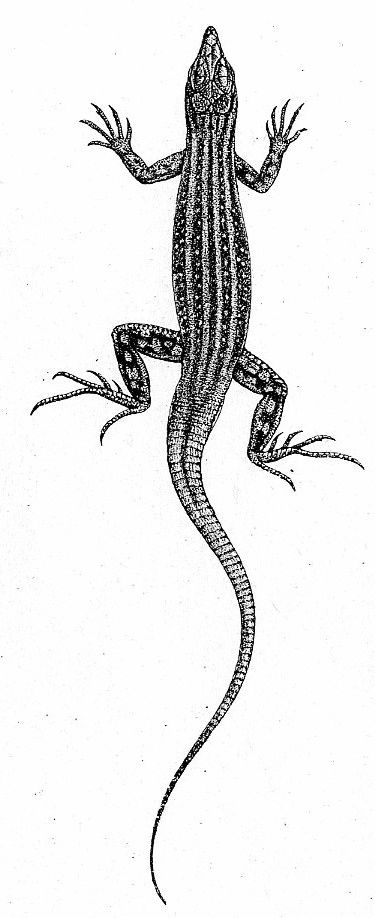

Conservation status
- Least Concern (IUCN 3.1)

Scientific classification
- Kingdom: Animalia
- Phylum: Chordata
- Class: Reptilia
- Order: Squamata
- Family: Lacertidae
- Genus: Pseuderemias
- Species: P. smithii

Binomial name
- Pseuderemias smithii (Boulenger, 1895)

Synonyms
- Eremias smithii Boulenger, 1895; Pseuderemias smithii — Lanza, 1983

= Pseuderemias smithii =

Species of lizard

Pseuderemias smithii, also known commonly as Smith's racerunner or Smith's sand racer, is a species of lizard in the family Lacertidae. The species is native to East Africa.

== Etymology ==
P. smithii is named after Arthur Donaldson Smith, who was an American physician and traveller.

== Geographic range ==
P. smithii is found in Ethiopia, Kenya, and Somalia.

== Reproduction ==
P. smithii is oviparous.
