= Smith's leaf-toed gecko =

Conservation status
- Least Concern (IUCN 3.1)

Scientific classification
- Kingdom: Animalia
- Phylum: Chordata
- Class: Reptilia
- Order: Squamata
- Suborder: Gekkota
- Family: Gekkonidae
- Genus: Hemidactylus
- Species: H. smithi

Binomial name
- Hemidactylus smithi Boulenger, 1895
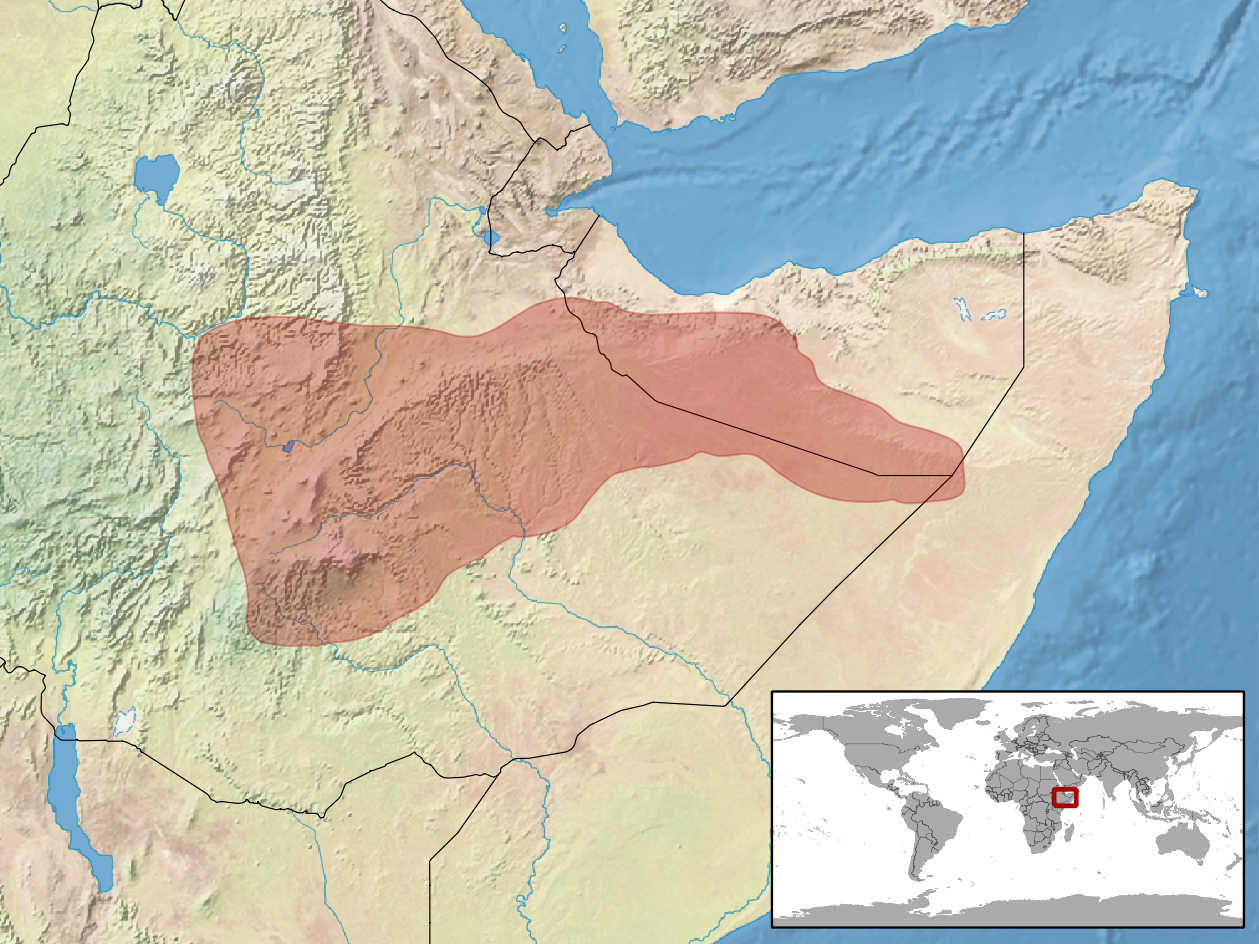

Species of lizard

Smith's leaf-toed gecko (Hemidactylus smithi) is a species of lizard in the family Gekkonidae. The species is endemic to the Horn of Africa.

== Etymology ==
The specific name, smithi, is in honor of American physician Arthur Donaldson Smith.

== Geographic range ==
H. smithi is found in eastern Ethiopia and northern Somalia.

== Habitat ==
The preferred habitat of H. smithi is at altitudes of 630–1,100 m (2,070–3,610 ft).

== Reproduction ==
H. smithi is oviparous.
