= Pseuderemias brenneri =

Conservation status
- Least Concern (IUCN 3.1)

Scientific classification
- Kingdom: Animalia
- Phylum: Chordata
- Class: Reptilia
- Order: Squamata
- Family: Lacertidae
- Genus: Pseuderemias
- Species: P. brenneri

Binomial name
- Pseuderemias brenneri (W. Peters, 1869)

Synonyms
- Eremias brenneri W. Peters, 1869; Eremias edwardsii Mocquard, 1888; Eremias brenneri — Boulenger, 1885; Pseuderemias brenneri — Lanza, 1983

Species of lizard

Pseuderemias brenneri, also known commonly as Brenner's racerunner or Brenner's sand racer, is a species of lizard in the family Lacertidae. The species is native to the Horn of Africa.

== Etymology ==
The specific name, brenneri, is in honor of Richard Brenner, who was a German explorer of Africa.

== Geographic range ==
P. brenneri is found in Djibouti, eastern Ethiopia, Somalia, and northeastern Sudan.

== Habitat ==
The preferred natural habitats of P. brenneri are desert, shrubland, and savanna, at altitudes from sea level to 1,100 m (3,600 ft).

== Description ==
P. brenneri may attain a snout-to-vent length (SVL) of about 5 cm (2.0 in), and a tail length of about 11 cm (4.3 in).

== Reproduction ==
P. brenneri is oviparous.
