= Manuel da Assumpção =

Portuguese missionary

Manuel da Assumpção (then spelled Manoel da Assumpçam) was a Portuguese missionary who wrote the first grammar of the Bengali language, in 1743, titled "Vocabulario em idioma Bengalla, e Portuguez" (Vocabulary of Bengali language and Portuguese. Divided into two parts) (archaic Portuguese: Vocabulario em idioma Bengalla, e Portuguez. Dividido em duas partes).

== Grammar and dictionary ==
The grammar was written in the Portuguese language. Assumpção wrote this first grammatical instructions of the Bengali language between 1734 and 1742 while in Bhawal estate, now in Bangladesh. The book was published in 1743 in Lisbon. The grammar was based on the model of the Latin grammar and used Latin script for writing Bengali words.

Bengali alphabetical sequence was not followed in the Bengali-Portuguese glossary. It followed the Latin order from A to Z. However, while laying the Latin alphabetical segments for Bengali-Portuguese glossaries, Monoel had covered certain Bengali characters within the segments recognizing those phonetic variations to the status of Bengali characters. For example, segment B, C, G, T covers the Bengali words starting with letters ব, চ, গ, ত, and segment Bh, Ch, Gh, Tt, Th & Tth representing the words starting with Bengali characters ভ, ছ, ঘ, ট, থ & ঠ respectively.

== Crepar Xastrer Orth, Bhed ==
Manuel da Assumpção wrote another book under the title “Crepar Xastrer Orth, Bhed” (কৃপার শাস্ত্রের অর্থ-ভেদ). It was a bilingual book Crepar Xastrer Orth, Bhed, / Cathecismo da Doutrina Christãa (Bengali / Portuguese) written in 1735 in Bhawal estate in Bengal, now Bangladesh and published in Lisbon in 1743. It was a missionary book, in format a dialogue between a clergyman and his disciple. The main text was printed on the right page while the translation in Bengali appeared on the left. The whole book was, however, printed in Roman type.
