= Arthur Donaldson Smith =

American explorer of East Africa (1866–1939)

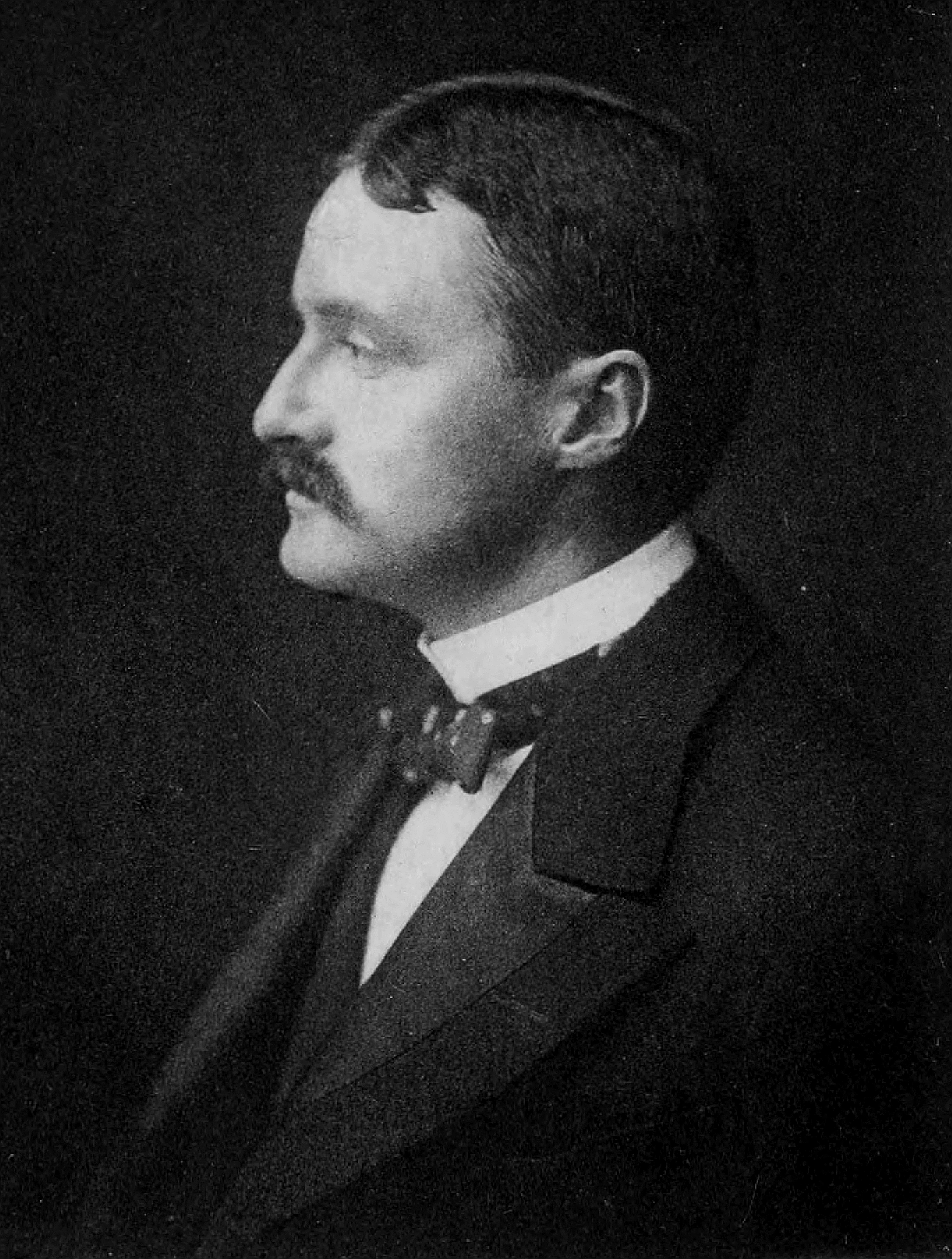
- Born: April 27, 1866; Andalusia, Pennsylvania, U.S.
- Died: February 19, 1939 (aged 74)
- Resting place: Laurel Hill Cemetery, Philadelphia, Pennsylvania, U.S.
- Education: University of Pennsylvania; Johns Hopkins University; Harvard Medical School; Heidelberg University
- Occupations: Physician, explorer

Arthur Donaldson Smith (April 27, 1866 – February 19, 1939) was an American explorer of East Africa. In 1894 and 1895, he led an expedition to Lake Rudolf (now Lake Turkana) and collected botanical, geological and zoological samples for scientific study. The expedition traversed 4,000 miles through British Somaliland, southern Ethiopia and Kenya. In 1897 he published a book about his travels, Through Unknown African Countries: the First Expedition from Somaliland to Lake Rudolf. He was a member of the American Philosophical Society and a Fellow of the Royal Geographical Society. Three species of reptiles, three birds and a desert musk shrew were named in his honor.

== Early life and education ==
Smith was born in Andalusia, Pennsylvania, on April 27, 1866, to Jesse Evans Smith and Martha Jane Knight. His family was wealthy and his paternal great-grandfather, Joest Smith Jr., served in the Continental Army during the American Revolutionary War. His ancestors had emigrated from Germany and anglicized the family name from Schmidt during the Revolutionary War to avoid any association with the Hessian mercenaries used by the British during war.

He attended the University of Pennsylvania and graduated in 1885. From 1885 to 1886, he was a graduate chemistry student at Johns Hopkins University. He studied at Harvard Medical School from 1886 to 1888 and at the Heidelberg University from 1888 to 1890. He served as a captain in the United States Army. He worked as a physician in a number of hospitals in Philadelphia for two years and then dedicated himself to exploration.

== African exploration ==
He was a big-game hunter, and became interested in the exploration of East Africa after a hunting trip in British Somaliland. In 1894 and 1895, in partnership with the British Museum, he led an expedition to Lake Rudolph (now Lake Turkana), passing through British Somaliland, southern Ethiopia and Kenya. The expedition was intended to explore the unknown lands and collect botanical, geological, and zoological samples for study. He traveled with an English hunter, an English taxidermist, 82 Somalis, and 84 camels. The expedition began in Berbera and traveled northwest to Lake Rudolph. He arrived at Lake Rudolph on July 10, 1895. He was the first explorer to reach the lake from the north and the first to see it since Sámuel Teleki and Ludwig von Höhnel seven years earlier. The expedition also explored Lake Stefanie (now Lake Chew Bahir), Mount Marsabit, the tomb of Sheikh Hussein, and returned to the coast by the Tana River, covering over 4,000 miles. The expedition was well supplied, avoided conflicts with native tribes and lost only six men. The expedition collected twenty-four new birds, eleven new reptiles, and a multitude of new insects.

In 1896 and 1897, he was in Ethiopia and may have been there during the Battle of Adwa when the Ethiopians defeated Italian forces. He returned to Lake Turkana in 1899.

In 1897, he published a book about the expedition titled, Through Unknown African Countries: the First Expedition from Somaliland to Lake Rudolf.

Smith was elected to the American Philosophical Society in 1897. He was a Fellow in the Royal Geographical Society. In 1902, he was awarded the Cullum Geographical Medal by the American Geographical Society.

He died on February 19, 1939, and was interred at Laurel Hill Cemetery in Philadelphia.

== Legacy ==
In 1895, three new species of reptiles endemic to the Horn of Africa were named in his honor by Belgian-British herpetologist George Albert Boulenger: the short racer Playceps brevis smithi, Smith's leaf-toed gecko Hemidactylus smithi, and Smith's racerunner Pseuderemias smithii. Three birds were named in his honor - Donaldson Smith's nightjar Caprimulgus donaldsoni, Donaldson Smith's sparrow-weaver Plocepasser donaldsoni, and Donaldson's Turaco Tauraco leucotis donaldsoni. The Desert musk shrew Crocidura smithii was also named in his honor.

== Publications ==
- Through Unknown African Countries, New York: Edward Arnold, 1897
