= Firingi Bazar =

Old Portuguese settlements in Chittagong, Bangladesh

Firingi Bazar ফিরিঙ্গি বাজার Firingi Bunder
- Ward
- Firingi Bunder
- Nicknames: Porto Grande de Bengala; Portuguese Bengal
- Location of Chittagong in Bangladesh Firingi Bazar (Bangladesh) Firingi Bazar (Asia)
- Coordinates: 22°20′06″N 91°49′57″E
- Country: Bangladesh
- Division: Chittagong
- District: Chittagong
- Establishment: 1528; 498 years ago

Government
  - Type: Municipality
  - Body: Chittagong City Corporation
- Demonym(s): Farangs, Firingis, Chittagonian, Chatgaiya, Sitainga

Languages
  - Official: Bengali • English
- Time zone: UTC+6 (BST)
- Postal code: 4000, 4100, 42xx
- Calling code: +880 31
- Police: Chattogram Metropolitan Police
- Website: ccc.gov.bd

Firingi Bazar (Bengali: ফিরিঙ্গি বাজার, Portuguese: Firingi Bunder) is a ward and settlement along the Karnaphuli River in Chittagong. The small part of Chittagong is well known for being the capital of the Portuguese settlement in Chittagong and Portuguese Bengal.

This is one of the two Firingi Bazars in Bangladesh the other being located in the capital city of Dhaka.

The upbringing of the settlement comes from the Portuguese times of colonialism in India which was known as the colony of Portuguese India (1505–1961). The Portuguese descendants of these were called Farang. Thus meaning European in the Persian language. These descendants created settlements all over the coast of Bengal in cities such as Chittagong, Dhaka, Kolkata, Chandannagar and Hoogly and Bandel. These settlements resulted in recreation of Portuguese architecture in the region of Bengal and creations of churches, trading posts etc. by missionaries.

One of the world's oldest ports with a functional natural harbor for centuries, Chittagong appeared on ancient Greek and Roman maps, including on Ptolemy's world map. It was located on the southern branch of the Silk Road. In the 9th century, merchants from the Abbasid Caliphate established a trading post in Chittagong. The port fell to the Muslim conquest of Bengal during the 14th century. It was the site of a royal mint under the Delhi Sultanate, Bengal Sultanate and Mughal Empire. Between the 15th and 17th centuries, Chittagong was also a center of administrative, literary, commercial and maritime activities in Arakan, a narrow strip of land along the eastern coast of the Bay of Bengal which was under strong Bengali influence for 350 years. During the 16th century, the port became a Portuguese trading post and João de Barros described it as "the most famous and wealthy city of the Kingdom of Bengal". The Mughal Empire expelled the Portuguese and Arakanese in 1666.

The Nawab of Bengal ceded the port to the British East India Company in 1793.
