= Floriano Vaz =

Indian writer and activist (1963–1986)

- Portrait of Vaz around the 1980s
- Born: Floriano Vas; 8 September 1963; Gogol, Goa, India
- Died: 20 December 1986 (aged 23); Gogol, Goa, India
- Cause of death: Murder (gunshot wound to the stomach)
- Monuments: Bust at Floriano Vaz Circle, Margao
- Occupations: Writer; activist
- Known for: First martyr of the Konkani language agitation
- Movement: Konkani language agitation

Floriano Vaz (né Vas; 8 September 1963 – 20 December 1986) was an Indian writer and activist. He was the first martyr of the scheduled tribe community who fought for the official status of the Konkani language during the Konkani language agitation.

== Early and personal life ==
Floriano Vas was born on 8 September 1963 in Gogol, Goa to Inacio Vas and Luizinha Araujo. He belonged to the scheduled tribe community and had a brother and a sister.

== Death ==
On 20 December 1986, a heated argument took place between Sudin Bhagvanta Naique, a businessman and son of a prominent industrialist from Comba, and Vaz, who was his ex-employee. Vaz and his supporters had stopped Naique's car from moving forward by blocking the road with boulders. At 1:20 pm, Rajaram G. Pawar, a head constable of the Gujarat State Reserve (SRP), at the behest of Naique, shot Vaz, aged 23 with a 303 rifle near his residence at Gogol.

At 4:00 pm, Vaz died while protecting himself from haemorrhage and shock from the gunshot wound. The rest of his six accomplices were killed at Neura, Tiswadi. Later, a memorial was installed in their honour at the facade of the St. Lawrence Church at Agaçaim, Goa.

The news was first declared by Mark Tully, the then BBC New Delhi Bureau Chief, at around 5:00 pm, before any local news agencies reported it. This declaration sparked a riot in Margao, with people claiming that the news was connected to the Konkani language agitation, making it an obvious act.

== Legacy ==
A roundabout has been named in Vaz's honour known as the Floriano Vaz Circle wherein the bust of Vaz was constructed by former Goa Chief minister, Churchill Alemao at Gogol traffic junction in Margao.

A tiatr was produced by Menino de Bandar in honour of Vaz, titled "Floriano Vaz - Poilo Matir" (transl. Floriano Vaz - First Martyr). It included noted cast like Alfred Rose, Mario Menezes and M. Boyer.

In December 2011, the Floriano Vaz recreation complex was reportedly under construction at Chandravaddo, Fatorda.

== Aftermath ==
=== 1987 case study ===
A case study was done a year later after Vaz's death, in 1987, by Lionel Messias. This was published in the Gomantak Times Weekender on 24 December 2006. As per this investigation, the death of Vaz was a "cold blooded murder" and attempts were made to close the case. Messias stated that the day Vaz was murdered, around noon, Jose Francisco Gomes, a local of the Gogol neighbourhood, heard a single gunshot and ran towards the three houses owned by the Vaz clan. Gomes witnessed Vaz fallen on the ground, injured with a stomach wound. He also noticed a Fiat car, possibly the Premier Padmini driven by Naique, parked besides the SRP van.

Hours after Vaz's death, the Margao police station issued two official versions describing the incident. The first instance said that Vaz along with his three accomplices had restrained sub-inspector Narayan K Yetale of the Goa Police and had made attempts to seize Yetale's service revolver, after which the accompanying SRP took Vaz down. The second version claimed that a violent crowd of around 400-500 had attacked the police who in self defence shot Vaz.

Messias further states that the "whitewash" was unmethodical to an extent that Vaz along with the 400-500 violent mob were charged under Cr. No. 444/86 u/s 341, 143, 147, 148, 323, 353, 332, 307 of the IPC r/w 149 IPC for assaulting the police, setting up the blockade and grabbing service weapons. As per the scrutiny of the panchanama conducted at the hospital around 4:00–4:30 pm IST, stated that no external injuries were found. Further, they mentioned, "Vaz's body was turned and except the bandaged area where he was shot, no other injuries were visible".

A source later revealed that no panchanama was done. Instead, the deputy collector and station police inspector were called by the inspector to witness Vaz's injuries. The inspection began before and after the post mortem. Messias reported that Vaz's body bore 15 marks caused by a dull weapon, probably a police lathi. The longest mark was 23.5×3 cms which was underneath the right antebrachium, which explained the defensive posture of Vaz while shielding himself. There were also red swellings on both forearms, which were 3–21cms long, showing signs that Vaz was brutally beaten.

The police refused to disclose the post mortem reports. Vaz's family vowed that prior to the latter's death, Naique had promised to return with the police and teach Vaz a lesson. Naique had driven to the station and returned with 22 police personnel. This was later confirmed by police. It is also believed that an ASI, along with two policemen, had arrived at the road blockade in Naique's car.

The Vaz family had stated that the police arrived on the scene and questioned about Vaz at the first two houses owned by the clan. Upon discovering him in the third house, they dragged him out from the outhouse and assaulted him. His younger sister had pleaded with the ASI to arrest him instead but she was dragged away from Vaz. He was then shot at point blank range while defending himself, possibly with a protective helmet, which had fallen on the ground.

The accompanying ASI then faked an injury, but refused X-ray when he was admitted at a local government hospital. He later yielded once the medical officer insisted. The prevailing night of Vaz's death, a fishing net factory owned by the Naique family was set on fire. The next day, Bhagvanta Naique offered MLAs, Uday Bhembre and Luizinho Faleiro a sum of amount ₹20,000 (equivalent to ₹270,000 or US$2,800 in 2023) as compensation to the Vaz family. The same evening, another fishing net factory the family owned was destroyed, which forced the Naiques to stay at home.

== Vandalism, tributes and demands ==
On 16 September 2012, Vaz's bust was vandalized by unknown individuals, the Dalgado Konknni Akademi expressed their shock and distress over the matter and asked the state government to take strict action on those who were responsible and rebuild the sculpture as fast as possible.

On 21 December 2015, at Vaz's 29th death anniversary, his brother, several well wishers and relatives paid floral tributes to the bust at Gogol traffic junction. The scheduled tribe association president, Camilo Barretto demanded immediate resignation of then Bicholim M.L.A, Naresh Sawal from the Goa Legislative Assembly and appealed that he may migrate to Maharashtra for demanding equal official status for the Marathi language. Barretto further demanded that the Government of Goa should provide jobs to Vaz's family, he also stated that many politicians in the past had made promises of providing jobs to the family and restoration of Vaz's house but till date none was fulfilled.

On 9 September 2021, at Vaz's 58th birth anniversary, Barretto and the Councilors of Margao demanded that for his contributions to the Konkani language, Vaz should be remembered officially at government level. Barretto further added, Vaz is an inspiration to the scheduled tribe community (ST) and will make sure that justice is served to the ST community in all fronts.
