= Parvatibai Chowgule College =

Private college in Goa, India

Parvatibai Chowgule College of Arts and Science
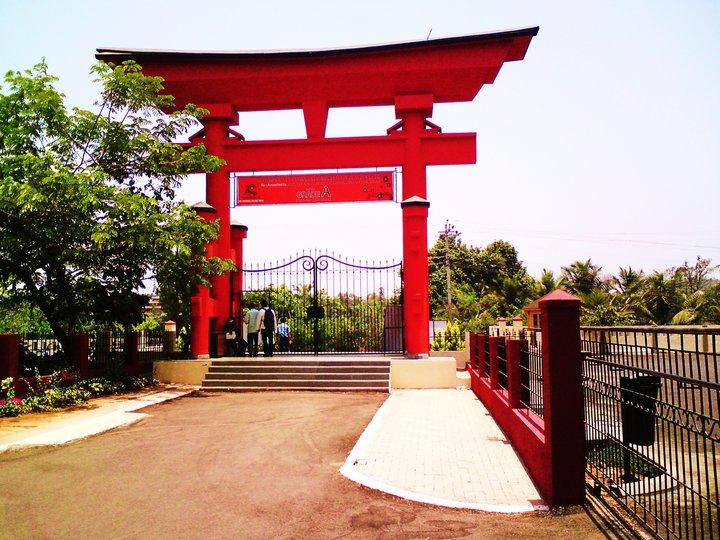
- The Chowgule College entrance, 2010
- Other names: Smt. Parvatibai Cultural Foundations College of Arts & Science
- Established: 23 June 1962; 64 years ago
- Academic affiliations: Autonomous
- Principal: Dr. Sangeeta G. Sankhalkar
- Location: Gogol, Goa, India; 15.288°N 73.977°E
- Mascot: Tiger (Chowgule Tigers)
- Website: chowgules.ac.in

Parvatibai Chowgule College of Arts & Science is a private autonomous college based in the South Goa district of Margao, on the west coast of India.

== History ==
Vishwasrao Chowgule, an industrialist and philanthropist, had been negotiating with the newly formed Government of Goa, Daman and Diu, to get a plot of land to build a college. In 1962, Chowgule family got permission to house a college in the military barracks setup near Arlem, Margao. Founded in memory of his mother, the college was inaugurated by the then External Minister of India Lakshmi N. Menon on 23 June 1962.

In 2008, Chowgules was accredited with A Grade by NAAC and in 2010, won the Goa University Silver Jubilee Year Award for "Best College."

== Courses ==
Chowgule College offers Bachelor's degrees in:

- Bachelor of Vocational Education
- Bachelor of Arts
- Bachelor of Science

and Master's degrees in:

- Master of Arts, with subspecialties in English, Geography, Hindi, History, and Economics, and Child Psychology
- Master of Science, with subspecialities in Information Technology and Biotechnology

It also offers a post-graduate diploma in Computer Applications. It is the only institution in Goa to offer a master's degree (M.A.) in Child Psychology and one of very few colleges in Goa to offer Geology as a Bachelor of Science subspecialty.

As the main college for Arts and Science education in South Goa since the early 1960s, it has been home to a number of prominent alumni. Its present principal is Dr. Prof. Sangeeta. G. Sankhalkar. As of the 2015-2016 academic year, Chowgule College is also Goa's first autonomous college.

== Facilities ==
The Chowgule College Library encompasses reading rooms, book stacks and special function areas such as visual room and multimedia resource center.

The C-Library has a collection of 57,794 items. It subscribes to 75 latest scientific as well as general journals. The specialist collection includes books, extensive reference materials, AV materials, rare photo collection etc. More than 2700 bound volumes are also available.

Chowgule Sports and Fitness Center is in the south of Goa on a sprawling 5-acre property. The center has an indoor capacity of 35,000 sq. ft. which is equipped with sports and recreational fitness facilities featuring: cardio equipment, selector machines, free weights, indoor running track, plyometrics platform, dot drill mats, Jacuzzi, steam bath and changing rooms for men and women.

In 2007, the campus inaugurated its exclusive Wi-Fi network, that promoted e-learning as well setting up online courses called Chowgules Learn Anytime Any Place (CLAAP), which helped students get course material online and have discussions in forums.

== Student life ==
Tathastu is the annual inter-collegiate event organised by Chowgule College and has seen increasing participation over the years. Other annual activities carried out in the academic field include subject-day celebrations when activities like quizzes, debates, poster-making, etc. are held. A few prominent events like Pegasus (English Department), 'The Bard By The Mandovi- Shakespeare Festival' (English Department, Nebula (Geology Department), Revelations (Economics Department), I-RIX (Computer Science Department), Geographize (Geography Department) etc. are well known in Goa and surrounding states. Pegasus is the first inter-collegiate literary festival in Goa and has completed 14 years since its inception in 2008. Geographize, which enables students to showcase their geographical skills through various events, was first held in 2012 and has since become a national event.

The tiger is the official mascot of the college and the students are regarded as "Chowgule Tigers".

In April 2010, a sequence of the film Golmaal 3 was shot on the sports campus.

The Founder's day celebration at the college has invited prominent chief guests like Chetan Bhagat (2010), Nandita Das (2011), Milkha Singh (2014), Viren Rasquinha (2015) and Terence Lewis (2016).
