= Margao =

Margao Modgaum (Goan Konkani) Margão (Portuguese)
- City
- Margao
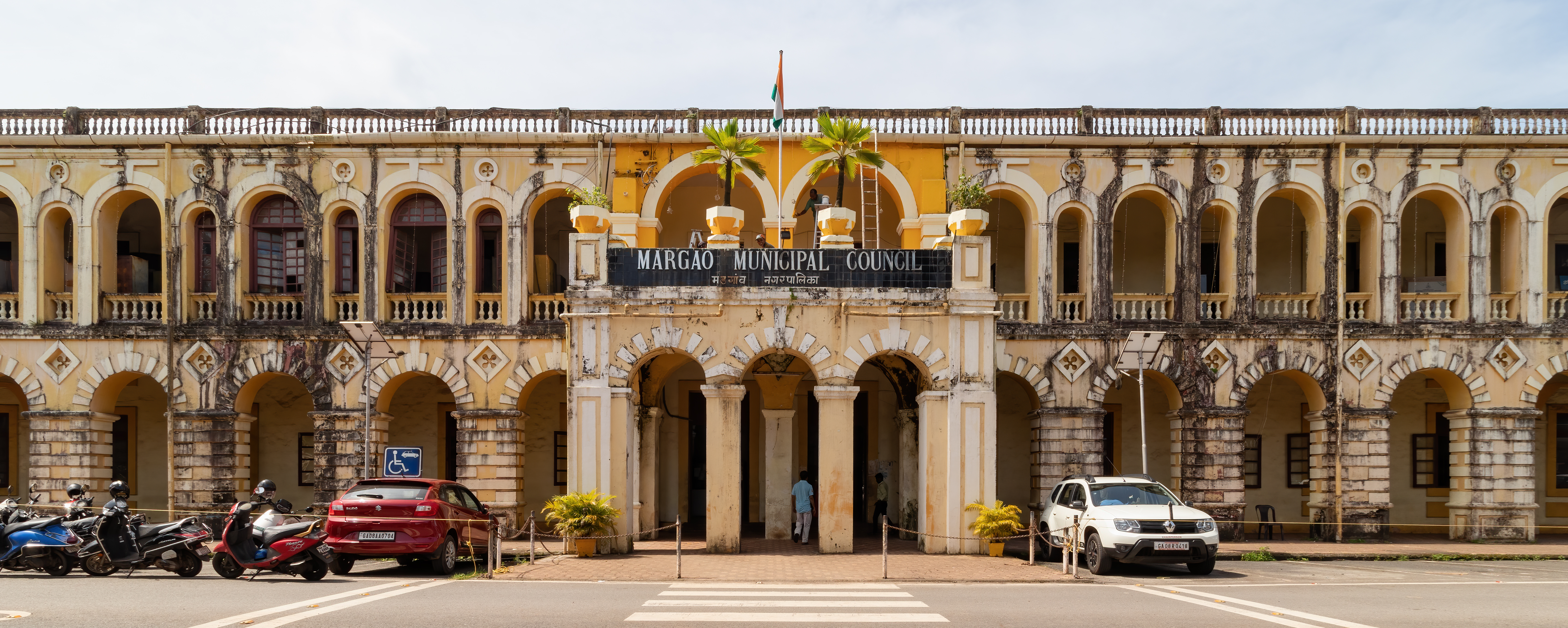
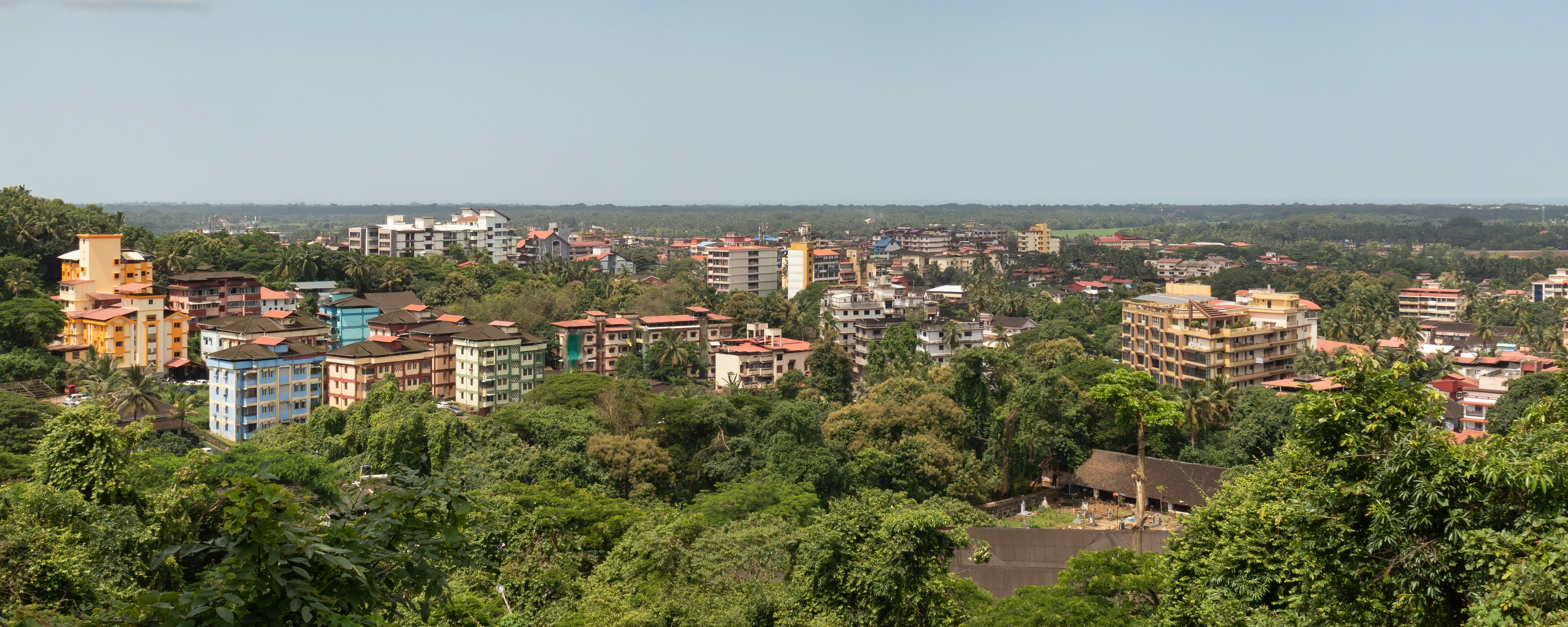
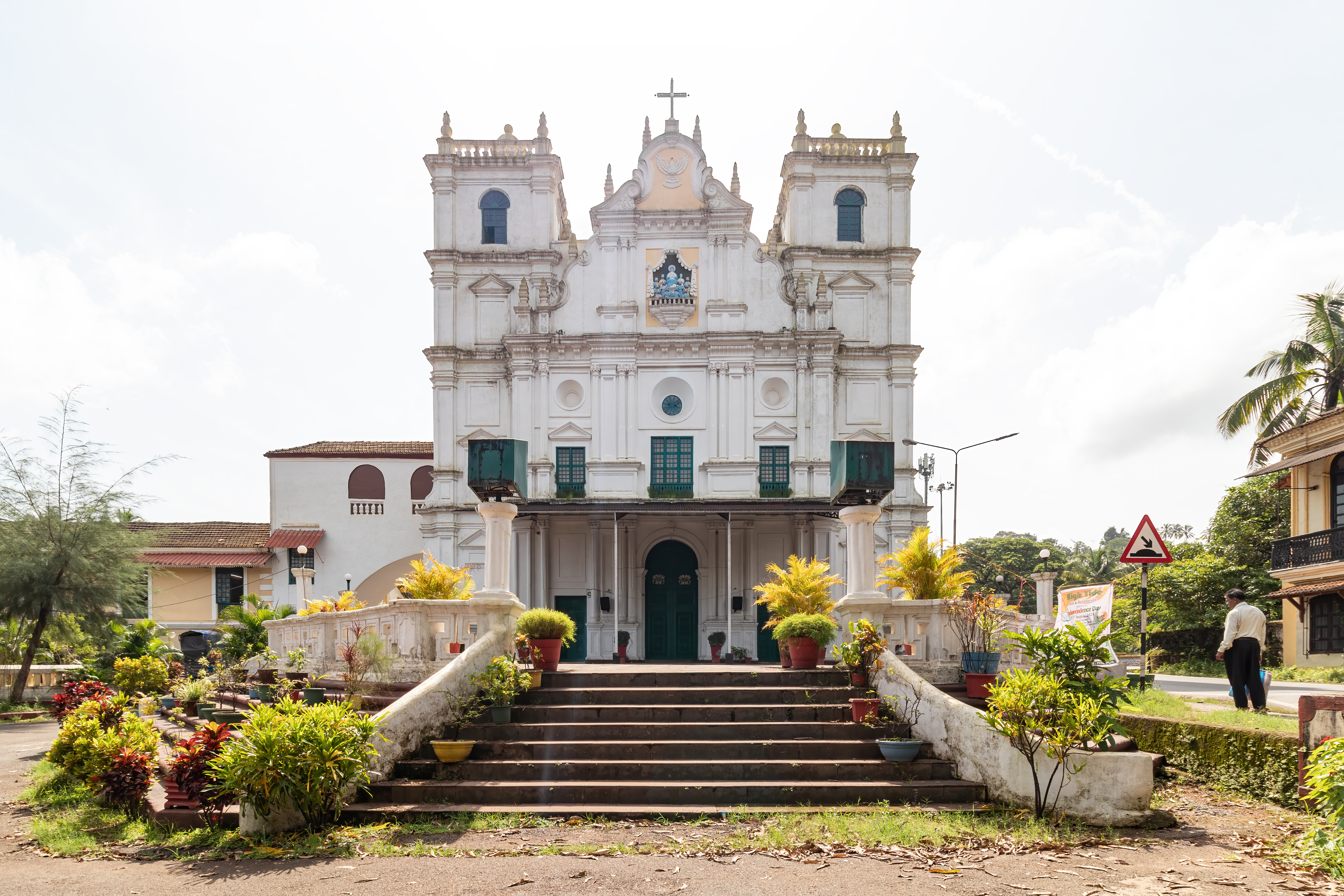
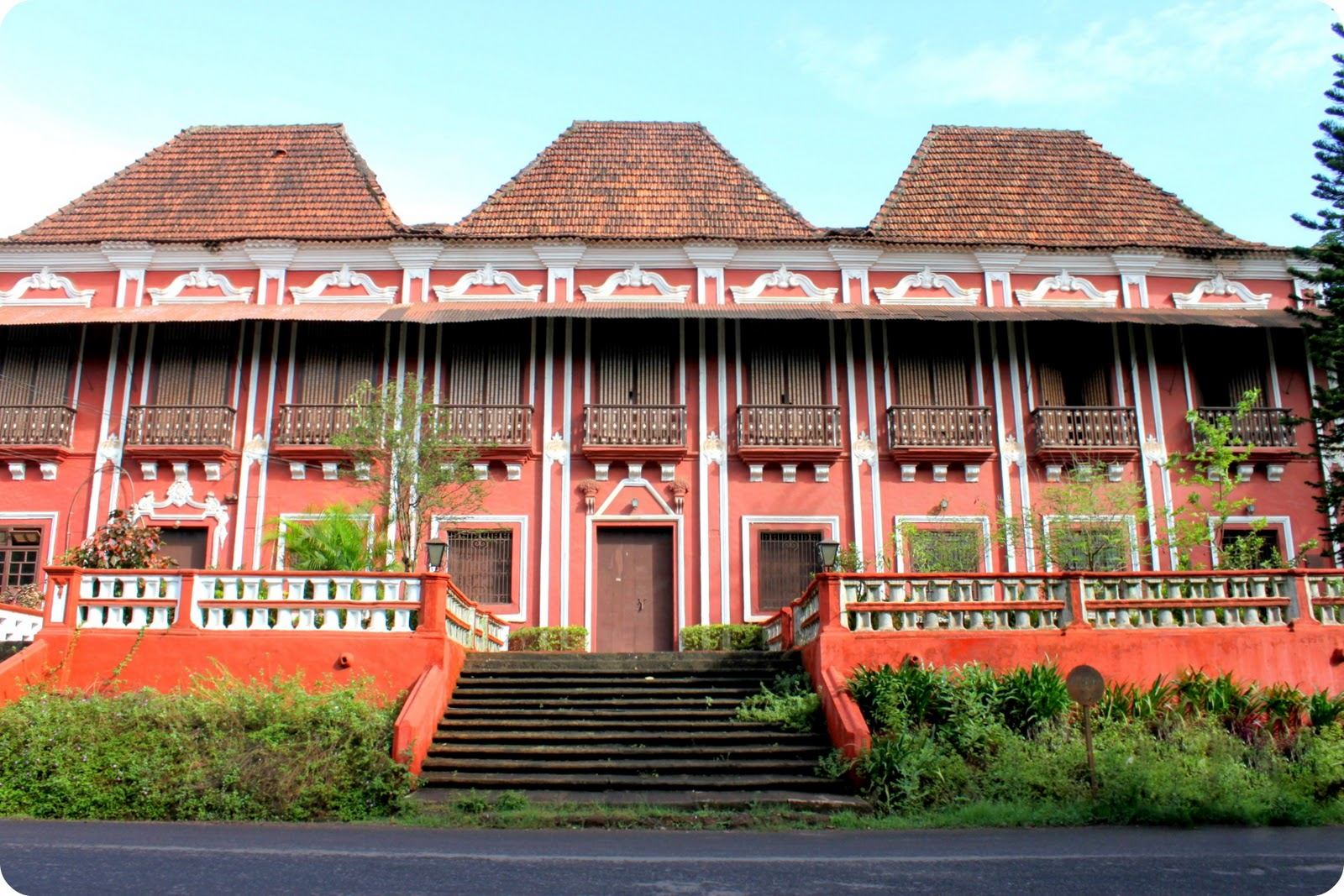
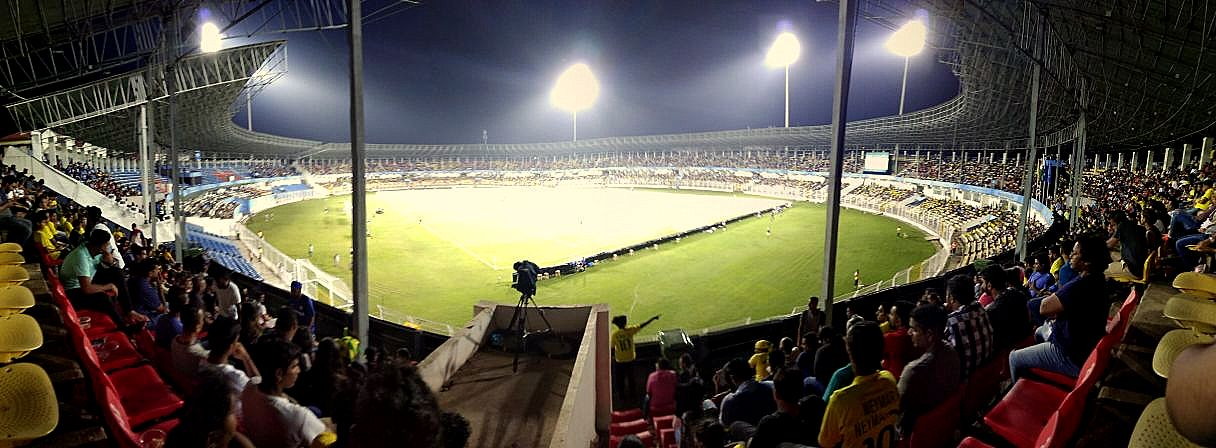
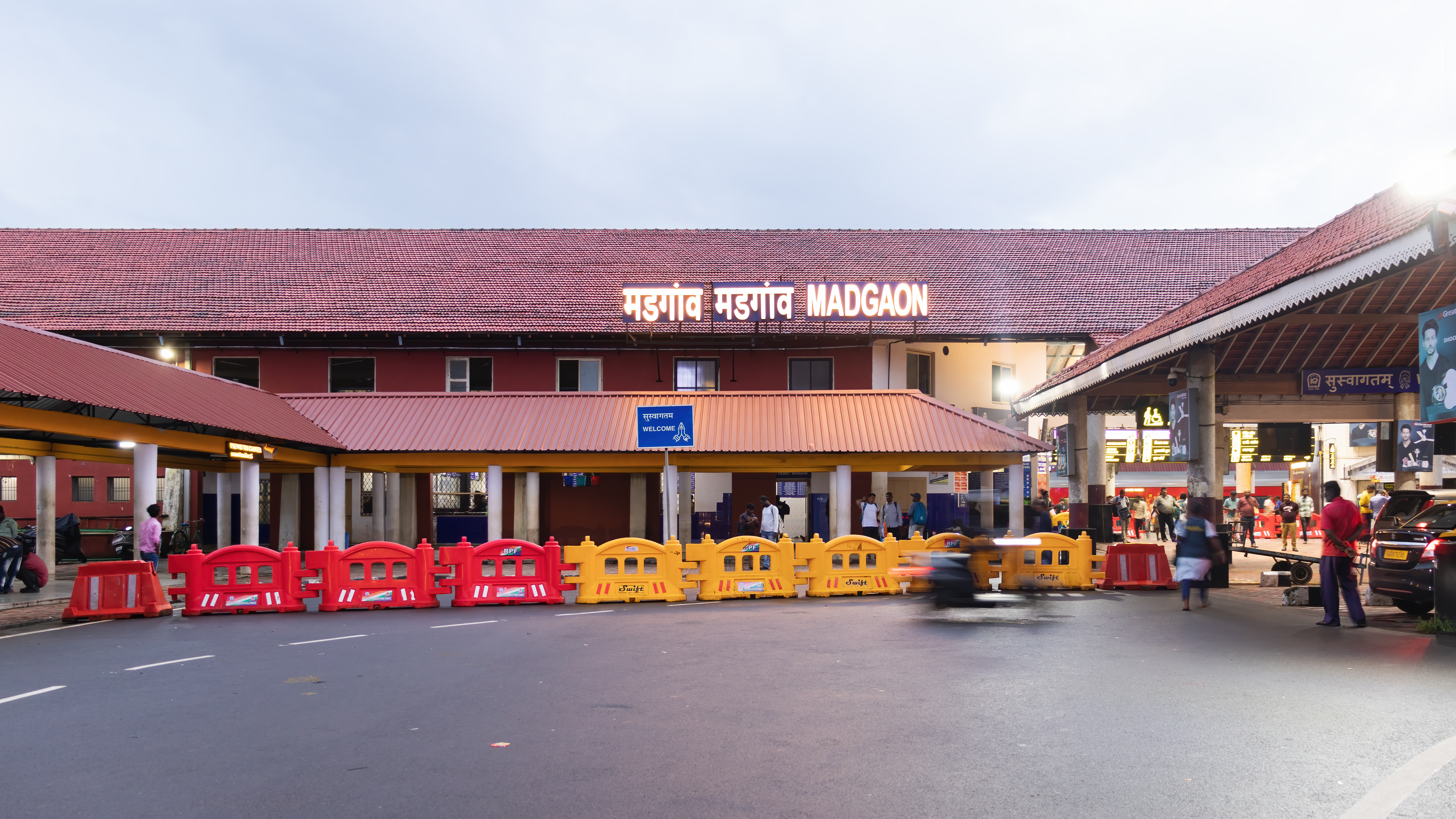
- Top to bottom (left to right): Margao municipal council, Holy Spirit Church, Fatorda Stadium, Margao cityscape, House of Seven Gables, Railway station
- Interactive map of Margao
- Coordinates: 15°16′25″N 73°57′29″E
- Country: India
- State: Goa
- District: South Goa
- Sub-district: Salcete

Government
  - Member of Parliament, Lok Sabha: Viriato Fernandes
  - Member of the Legislative Assembly: Digambar Kamat
  - Chairperson: Pooja Naik

Area
  - City: 16.10 km^{2} (6.22 sq mi)
  - Metro: 24.1 km^{2} (9.3 sq mi)
- Elevation: 10 m (33 ft)

Population (2011)
  - City: 87,650
  - Density: 5,444/km^{2} (14,100/sq mi)
  - Metro: 106,484
- Demonym: Madgaonkar

Languages
  - Official: Konkani
  - Additional official: Marathi and English
  - Cultural: Portuguese
- Time zone: UTC+5:30 (IST)
- PIN: 403601/2
- Telephone code: 0832
- Vehicle registration: GA-02, GA-08
- Website: mmcmargao.gov.in

Margao (Goan Konkani: Modgaum, IPA: [mɵɖɡãʋ]; Portuguese: Margão, IPA: [mɐɾɡɐ̃ũ]) is the commercial capital of the Indian state of Goa. It stands on the banks of the river Sal. It is the district headquarters of South Goa, and administrative headquarters of Salcete sub-district. It is Goa's second largest city by population after Mormugao.

== Etymology ==
Margão is the Portuguese spelling. The etymology of the name has been debated, with theories ranging from the name having evolved from the pre-colonial Mahargao (village of Mahars, a community of weavers) to being derived from the Sanskrit मठग्राम (Maṭhagrāma, a village of monasteries) owing to the shrines of Matsyendranath and Gorakhnath in Ravanfond, now a suburb of Margao.

Alternatively, Margão may be derived from Mharuganv (village of demons), or Maravile, Portuguese for "marvellous village."

== History ==
Prior to Portuguese rule, Margao was an important settlement and known as Maṭhagrāma (the village of monasteries) as it enshrined nine mathas in temple schools. Its replacement in 1579 was destroyed by raiders. The present church was built in 1675.

While the western side of the Holy Spirit Church developed as a market place, the settlement grew on the eastern side, that is, the Borda region.

=== Câmara Municipal de Salcete ===
The Municipality during the erstwhile Portuguese regime was known as "Câmara Municipal de Salcete", catering to all the villages in Salcete Taluka for over 300 years until the Goa Municipalities Act of 1968 came into force. The Câmara Municipal de Salcete is now reconstituted into Margao Municipal Council. The Members of the Câmara Municipal de Salcete were then nominated by the Government, but after the reconstitution of the Municipal Council, the Members to all the 25 wards (13 in Margao & 12 in Fatorda) are elected by the Members of the council.

Margao's importance as an administrative and commercial area grew with the increasing dependence of the surrounding towns and villages; leading to the administrative center with the town hall at its center being built in the south.

In 1961, Annexation of Goa led to its incorporation into the Republic of India, and Margao was declared as the administrative center of the district of South Goa.

== Geography ==
=== Topography ===
Margao is located at 15°16′25″N 73°57′29″E. It has an average elevation of 10 m (33 ft).

Nestled on the banks of the Sal River, Portuguese style mansions dot its landscape. One of the fastest growing cities in Goa, surrounding towns and villages include Aquem, Fatorda, Gogol, Borda, Comba, Nuvem, Verna, Loutolim, Navelim, and Davorlim.

=== Climate ===
Margao features a typical Konkan tropical monsoon climate (Köppen Am). The "hot" season lasts from March until May when the temperature reaches up to 36 °C or 96.8 °F and the "cool" from December to February when it is usually ranges from 15 to 28 °C (59.0 to 82.4 °F). From June to September the monsoon brings extremely heavy rainfall, oppressive humidity and gusty winds. The annual average rainfall is 2,881 mm (113.4 in).

Climate data for Margao
Month	Jan	Feb	Mar	Apr	May	Jun	Jul	Aug	Sep	Oct	Nov	Dec	Year
Mean daily maximum °C (°F)	30.9 (87.6)	33.7 (92.7)	36.1 (97.0)	37.0 (98.6)	38.3 (100.9)	30.4 (86.7)	29.0 (84.2)	28.8 (83.8)	29.7 (85.5)	35.7 (96.3)	32.9 (91.2)	29.6 (85.3)	32.7 (90.8)
Mean daily minimum °C (°F)	21 (70)	22 (72)	23 (73)	25.5 (77.9)	26.4 (79.5)	24.7 (76.5)	24.3 (75.7)	24.0 (75.2)	23.9 (75.0)	23.8 (74.8)	22.2 (72.0)	20 (68)	23.4 (74.1)
Average rainfall mm (inches)	0 (0)	0.1 (0.00)	0.6 (0.02)	7.2 (0.28)	97.1 (3.82)	861.5 (33.92)	899.8 (35.43)	591.6 (23.29)	256.3 (10.09)	116.5 (4.59)	33.9 (1.33)	16.2 (0.64)	2,880.8 (113.41)
Source: IMD

== Demographics ==
Religion in Margao (2011)
1. Hinduism (53.6%)
2. Christianity (28.2%)
3. Islam (17.6%)
4. Jainism (0.32%)
5. Sikhism (0.07%)
6. Buddhism (0.06%)
7. Other or not religious (0.08%)

As of the 2011 census of India, Margao had a population of 87,650. Males constituted 51% of the population and females 49%. It had an average literacy rate of 90%; male literacy was 93%, and female literacy 86.8%. In Margao, 9.8% of the population was under 7 years of age. With a population of 106,484 in the metropolitan area, Margao is second largest Urban agglomeration in Goa.

=== Languages ===
Konkani is the most widely spoken language in Margao, followed closely by English. Portuguese is still spoken and understood by a small number of people. Hindi is also spoken and understood by a majority of the city's population as a language to converse with non-konkani, non-English speaking people. The dialect of Konkani in South Goa differs notably from that spoken in North Goa. Marathi is also understood to a significant level. A sizeable fraction of the flower and vegetable merchants converse in Kannada.

== Government and politics ==
Margao is part of Margao (Goa Assembly constituency) and South Goa (Lok Sabha constituency).

The Margao Municipal Council traces its origins to the Camara Municipal de Salcete, established during Portuguese rule to administer the villages of Salcete Taluka. Following the enactment of the Goa Municipalities Act, 1968, it was reconstituted as the Margao Municipal Council. Unlike the former body, whose members were nominated by the government, the reconstituted council comprises councillors elected by residents of its municipal wards. The council is divided into 24 wards, each represented by an elected councillor.

== Culture/Cityscape ==
The city is also claimed as the cultural capital of Goa. A cultural center named Ravindra Bhavan was inaugurated by the then Chief Minister of Goa, Digambar Kamat in July 2008 at Fatorda which is also one of the official venues for the International Film Festival of India.

Margao also has Goa's biggest sports stadium, the Nehru Stadium at Fatorda.

The Akhil Bharatiya Marathi Sahitya Sammelan was held in 1964.

Some of the theatres in Margao include the Gomant Vidya Niketan, OSIA Multiplex, Vishant and Lata; in addition to Goa's biggest theatre, the Metropole. Inox has recently launched a multiplex with a capacity of 904 seats. The Gomat Vidya Niketan is a premier centre for arts in the town.

People from all over Goa congregate at the special market to buy spices and dried fish to be used during the monsoons.

The usual specialities that are found in the cuisine of Goa are also to be found in Margao. The curry of Margao is a praised local speciality. Cans of curry of Margao are currently exported to Portugal and elsewhere.

Margao is also the name of a brand of spices sold in Portugal.

=== Tourism ===
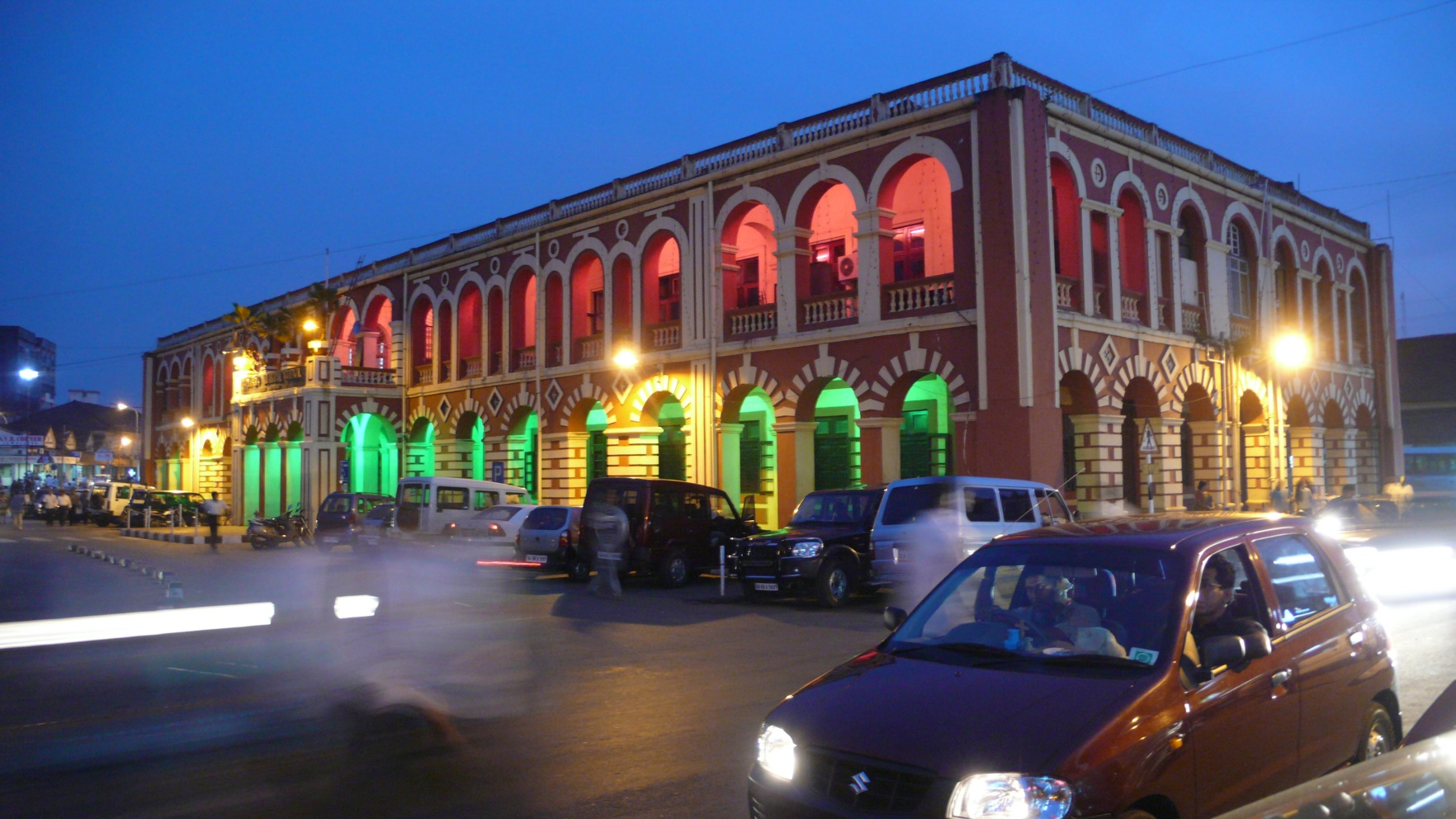
'Camara Municipal de Salcete' Margao city hall - by night

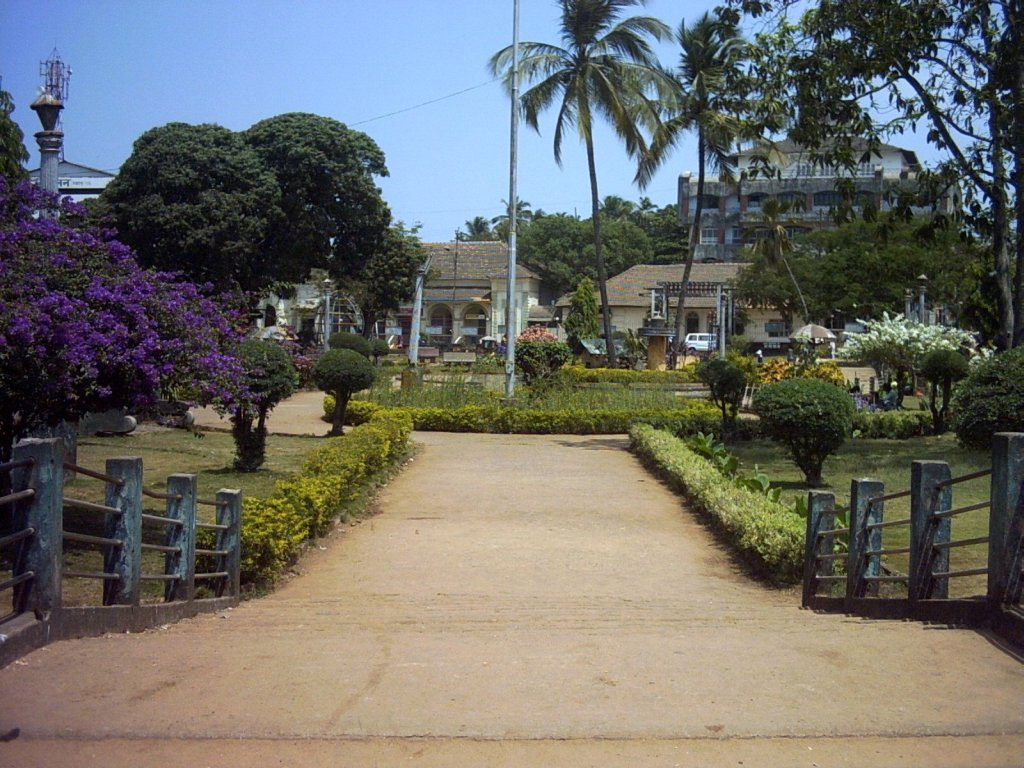
Margao Municipal Garden, located in the heart of the city.

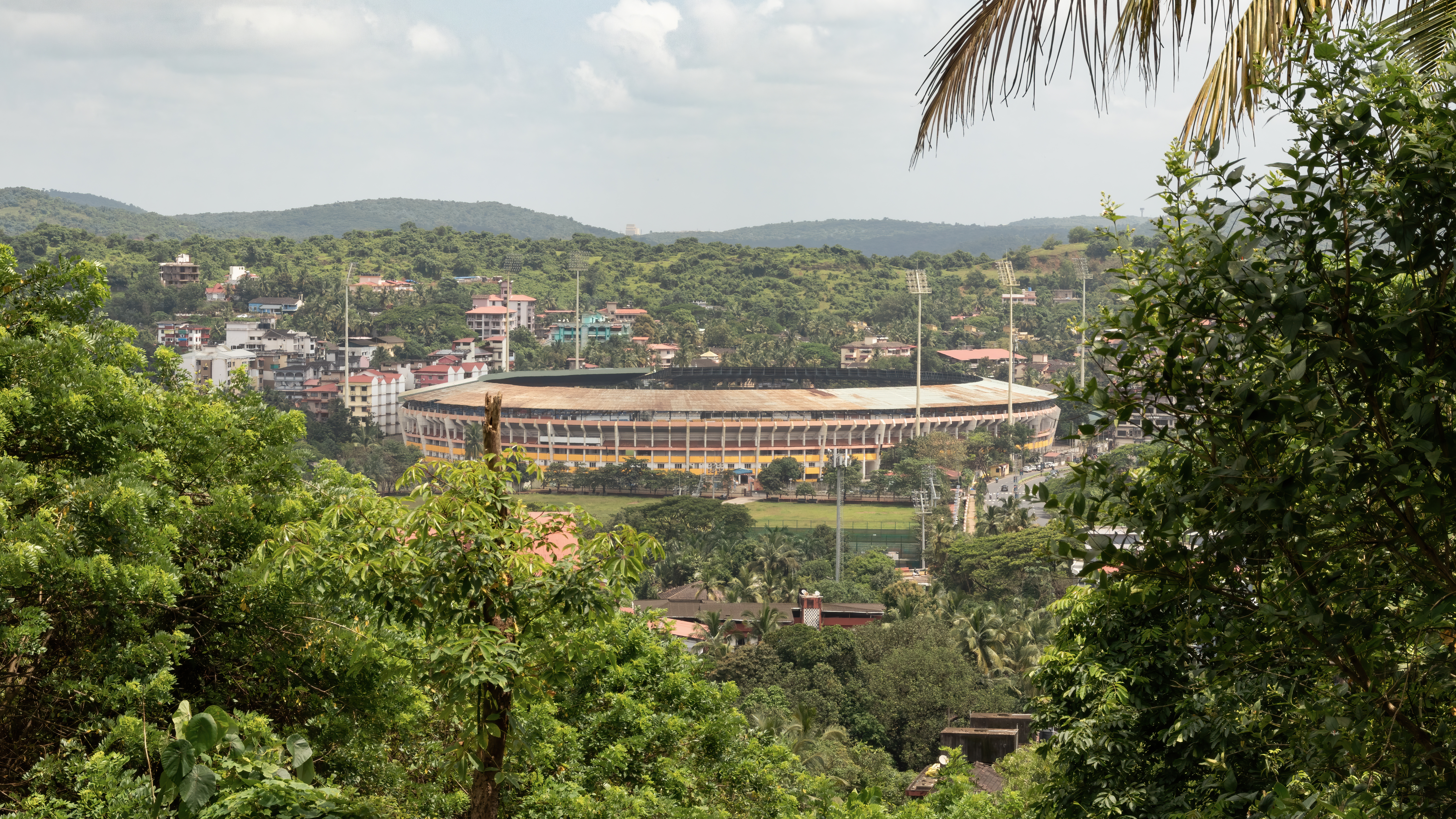
Jawaharlal Nehru Stadium, captured from Gogol Hill

The town has many sights and destinations. These include the Mercado de Afonso de Albuquerque which roughly translates to closed market and colloquially known as "Pimplapedd" or "Pimpalakatta", the municipal building (Câmara Municipal), the municipal garden named after benefactor Prince Aga Khan, Anna Fonte (natural springs), Old Market or Mercado Velho, Holy Spirit Church, grand colonial mansions such as the Seven Gables House, the chapel at Monte Hill.

Some of the town suburbs include Pajifond, Aquem, Gogol, Borda, Malbhat, Madel, Kharebandh, Old Market, Navelim and Comba, the last two being the oldest parts of the town.

Pandava Caves Located in Aquem Behind St. Sebestian Church.

There are a number of temples and churches in Margao city The famous churches in Margao are the Holy Spirit Church, the Grace Church, The St Sebastian Church in Aquem (The Old St. Sebastian Chapel, popularly known as the Pandava Copel still stands next to the modern St. Sebastian Church) and the Monte Hill Chapel. The famous temples are the 'Damodar Temple' (Saal), the 'Hari Mandir', the 'Maruti Mandir' at Davorlim the 'Saibaba Temple' at Davorlim, the 'Shiv Temple' (Ling) at Fatorda near Nehru Stadium (which is the original Temple of Damodara). There are two mosques in Margao, one in the Malbhat area and one on the Monte hill. There is also a Jain temple and a Jama'at Khana for the Khoja faith in Pajifond. There is also a Muslim community of Nizaris living in Margao.

=== Landmarks ===
==== Municipal Garden ====
In the centre of the town is the Municipal Garden, known as Praça Jorge Barreto, around which most restaurants and office buildings are located. On the park's south side are the colonial style red-washed Municipal building, known as Margao Town Hall which was built in 1905, and the Library. The northern segment of the Municipal garden was developed by the Mavany family and is named after His Highness Prince Shah Karim Al Hussaini, Aga Khan IV/Imam of Nizari Ismaili Muslims who visited Goa just before its liberation. The entire garden is now municipal property and is maintained by the Margao Municipal Council.

==== The Holy Spirit Church ====
The Largo de Igreja, or the Church of the Holy Spirit, was built by the Portuguese in 1675 and boasts a pristine white façade and an interior dripping with gilt crystal and stucco. The Municipal Garden square is defined on one side by the church with its baroque architecture and the parochial house, and on the other side by the palatial mansions of affluent elite Catholics, positioned in a row. The Associação das Communidades (Communities Association) building and the school being the odd exceptions which add to its character and sense of scale. They have a maximum height of two stories, and balcões balconies and varandas (verandas) facing the square. Parallel to the church square is the commercial street (old market). There is also a landscaped area next to the church called Praça da Alegria (Joy Square). The church feast is celebrated before the monsoons, it is a time when many residents make pre-monsoon purchases to stock up for a prolonged rainy season.

==== House of Seven Gables ====
Just within walking distance of the Holy Spirit Church, is the famous "House of Seven Gables" or "Sat Burzam Ghor". This magnificent mansion was built by Inacio Sebastiao da Silva, emissary and private secretary of the Portuguese Viceroy, in 1790. Today, only three of the seven gables remain. The family church with its Baroque and Rococo workmanship, exhibits the loftiness of the Portuguese time.

==== Narcinva D. Naik residence and Damodar Sal ====
The Narcinva D. Naik residence houses Margao's well-known temple-hall known as Damodar Sal or Dambaba Saal. The house played host to Swami Vivekananda during his visit to Goa in October 1892 before proceeding to Chicago to address the Parliament of Religions

== Transport ==
=== By Air ===
The nearest international airport is the Dabolim Airport which is 23 km away. Goa's new international airport at Mopa, inaugurated in 2022, is 64 km away.

=== By Rail ===
Madgaon railway station is a railway junction positioned at the intersection of the Konkan Railway and the South Western Railway (Guntakal–Vasco da Gama section) and is Goa's busiest. Due to its location and connectivity, the station is often used as a transit stop by many people who either head off down south to popular tourist destinations such as Palolem (38 km) or to Benaulim and Colva.

Margao hosted the test track for the Skybus Metro project, an elevated rail system patented by the Konkan Railway Corporation, This project was allegedly scrapped due to an accident which occurred during the test drive killing one engineer and seriously injuring three crew members. B Rajaram who had invented the rail system has stated that in his opinion the accident was avoidable.

=== By Road ===
Margao is on the National Highway 66 (erstwhile, NH 17; also formerly part of NH 47). Thereby, it is connected to other cities such as Panvel, Ratnagiri, Sawantwadi, and Panaji to its north, and Karwar, Bhatkal, Shiroor, Mangaluru, Kasaragod, Kozhikode, Kochi, Thiruvananthapuram, and Kanyakumari to its south. At Panvel, at the junction with National Highway 48, it connects to Mumbai.

Also, there is road which connects Margao to Ponda, São José de Areal, Sanvordem, Chandor, and other towns of Goa state.

Margao is located approximately 33 km (21 mi) from the capital Panjim, and 25 km (16 mi) from Dabolim Airport, 560 kilometres (350 mi) south of Mumbai.

Margao is well connected by Kadamba Transport Corporation buses, private taxis, Goa Miles, interstate bus corporations, and private luxury coaches.

== Education ==
Margao is home to many schools and colleges, the alumni of which have made significant contributions to Goa's cultural and scientific landscape. Most schools function in accordance with the curriculum prescribed by the Directorate of Education and the Goa Board of Secondary and Higher Secondary Education. The oldest, the Loyola High School (Goa) near the Old Bus Stand, is a Jesuit-run school. Other schools include Bhatikar Model English High School (established in 1935) named after its founder Late Pandurang Raya Bhatikar and Mahila & Nutan High School which was established as Samaj Seva Sangh's Mahila Vidyalay for girls in 1933 and started co-ed intake in June 1972. Manovikas English Medium School and Vidya Vikas Academy affiliated to the Council for the Indian School Certificate Examinations and Central Board of Secondary Education are highly sought after. The other educational institutes in Margao include St.Joseph High School at Aquem, Govt. High School Vidyanagar, Holy Spirit Institute, Presentation Convent High School, Fatima Convent High School, Perpetual Convent High School located in Navelim, and Popular High School in Comba near police station.

The colleges in Margao include The Parvatibai Chowgule College which was housed in Portuguese Military Barracks opposite Multipurpose High School in Vidyanagar. The college moved to its present location in 1972 under the direction of then principal P. S. Rege. Shree Damodar College of Commerce and Economics and Govind Ramnath Kare College of Law provide post secondary education in Commerce and Law respectively. Schools such as Shree Damodar Higher Secondary School Of Science and R.M.S Higher Secondary School focus exclusively on higher secondary education. There is also a government-run ITI (Industrial Training Institute) in Borda which imparts technical education. Don Bosco College of Engineering located at Fatorda is a technical degree granting institute in the town.

== Notable people ==
- Anthony Mendes (1920–1964), Indian actor and comedian
- Brandon Fernandes (born 1994), Indian professional footballer
- Dilip Sardesai (1940–2007), Indian international cricketer
- Floriano Vaz (1963–1986), Indian writer and activist
- Pai Tiatrist (1871–1947), Goan playwright and theatre actor
- Percival Noronha (1923–2019), Indian historian and heritage conservationist
- Roy de Chinchinim (born 1984), Indian playwright and director
- Jorge Barreto Xavier (born 1965), Portuguese cultural manager, university professor and politician

== Gallery ==
Life in Margao

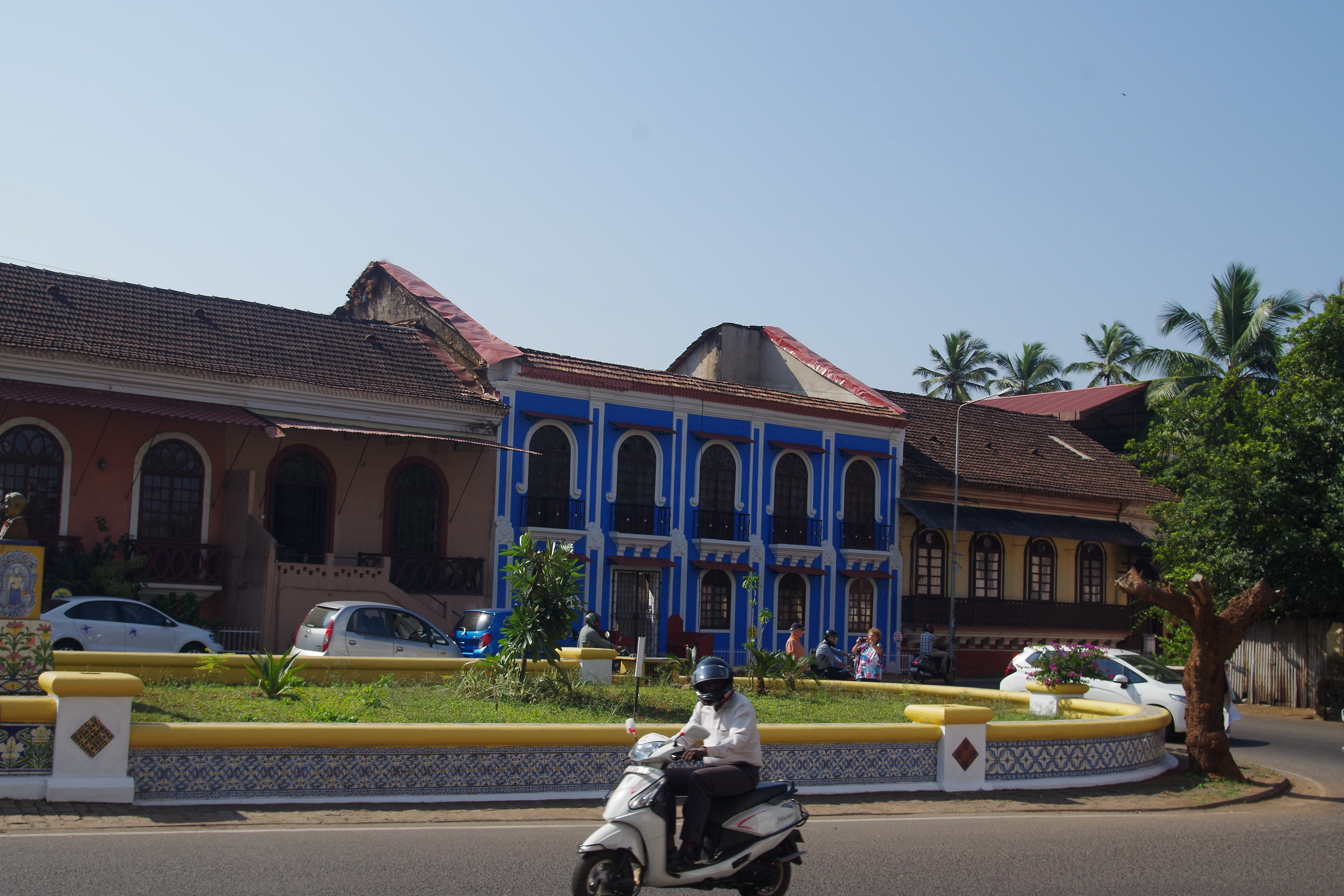
Margao, India

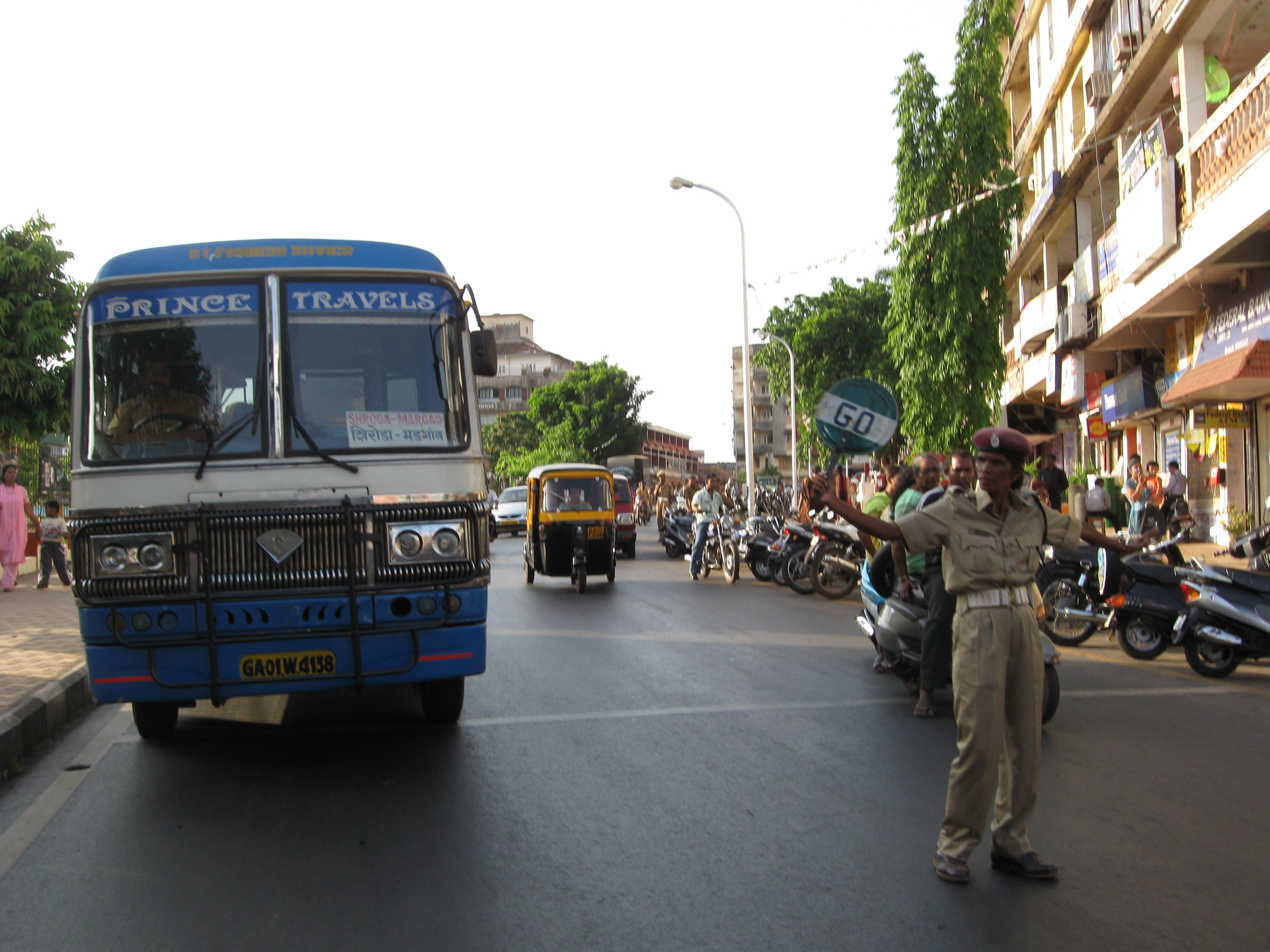
Margao Crossing Guard

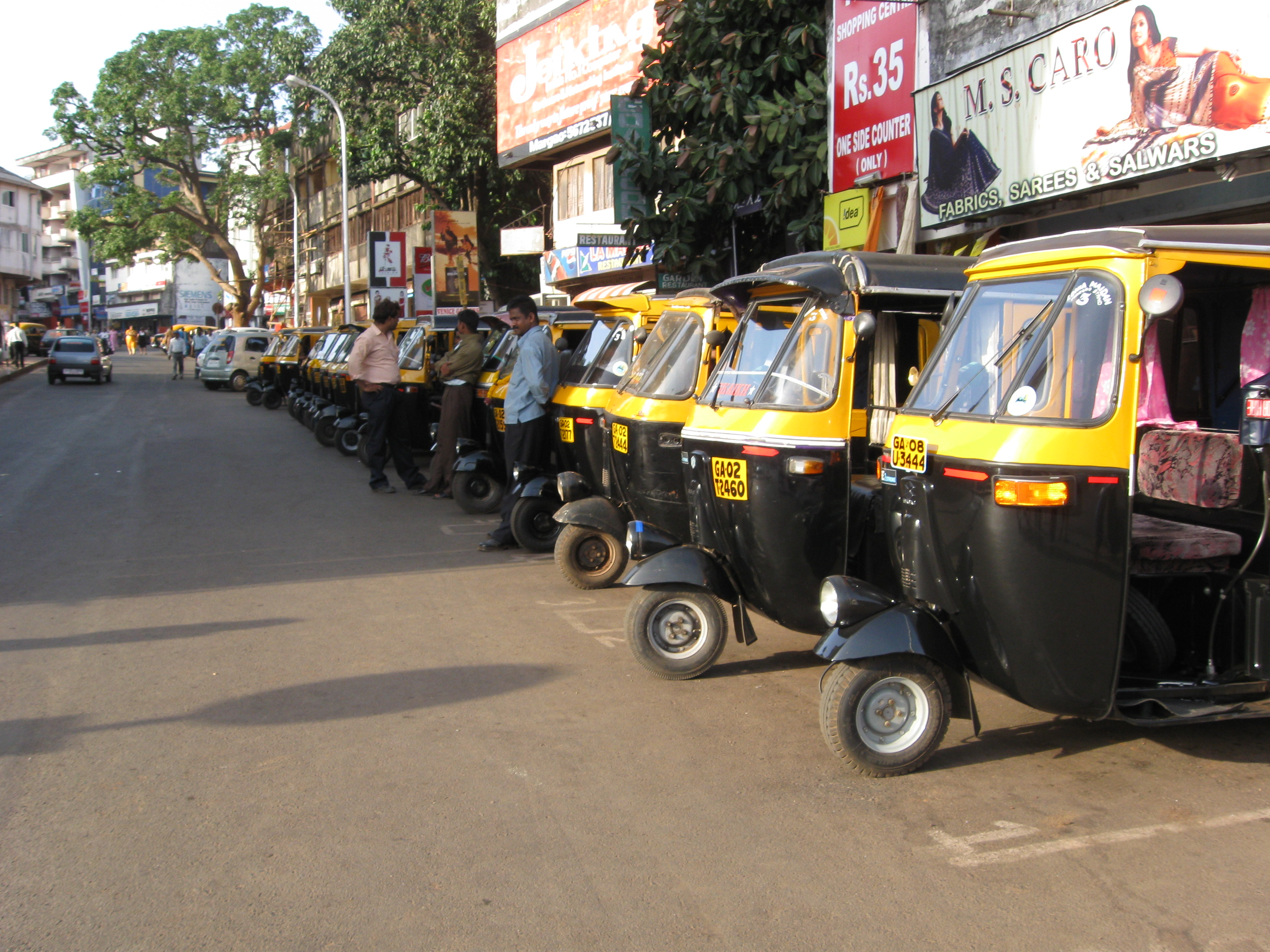
Rickshaw Stand

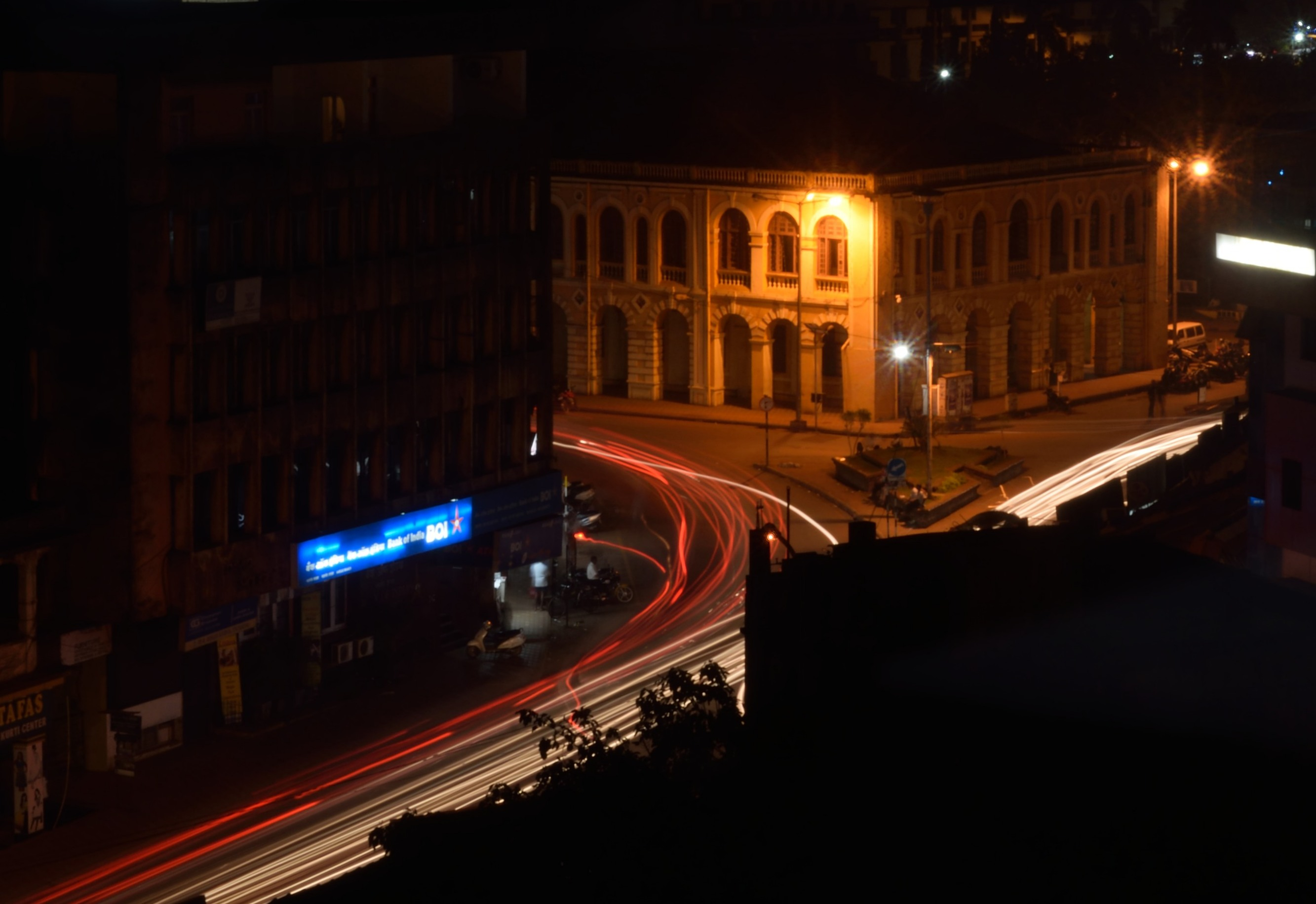
Margao Municipal Council Building

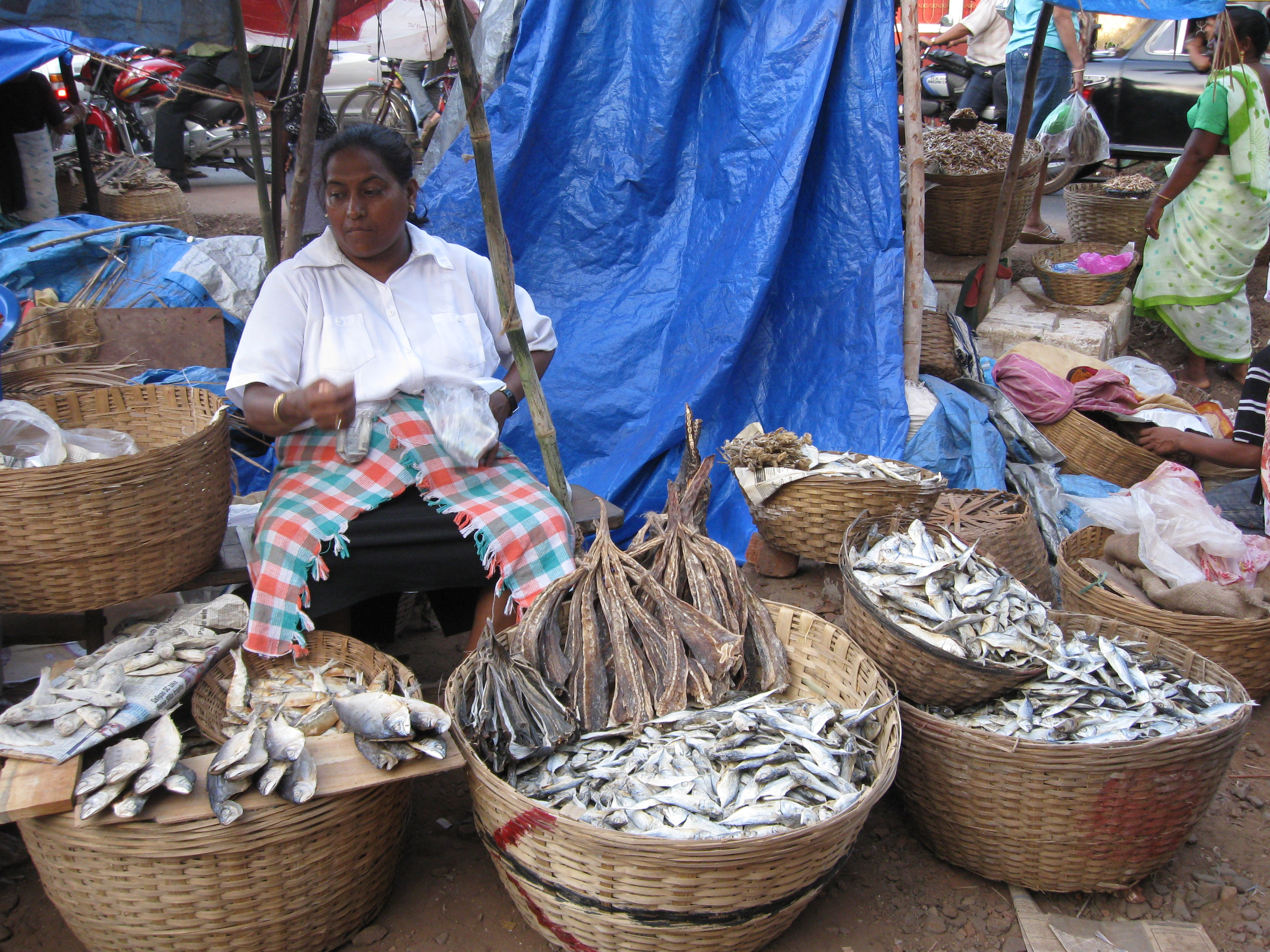
Vendor at Margao Fish Market

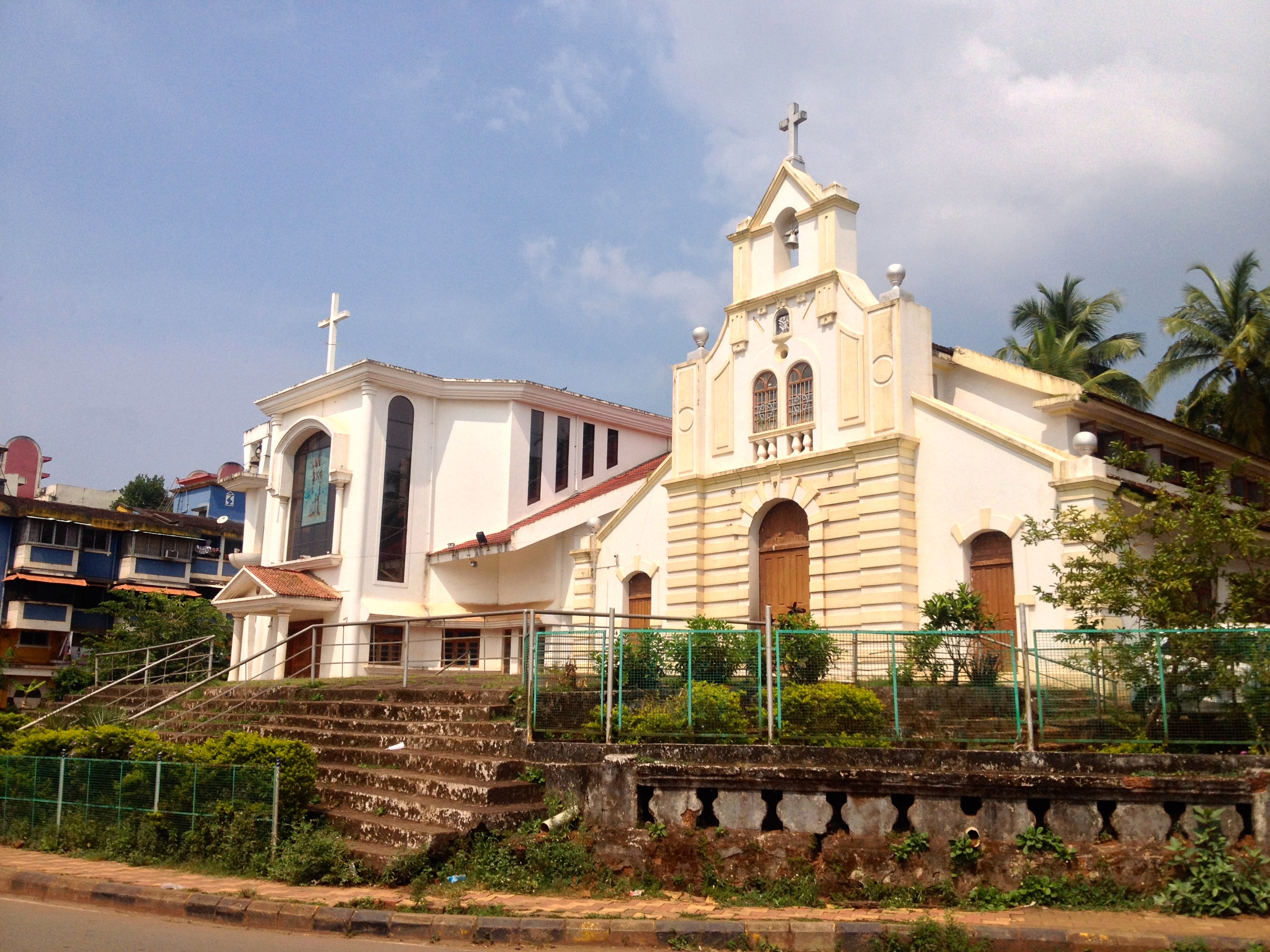
Old and new Igreja de São Sebastião - St. Sebastian Church in Aquem

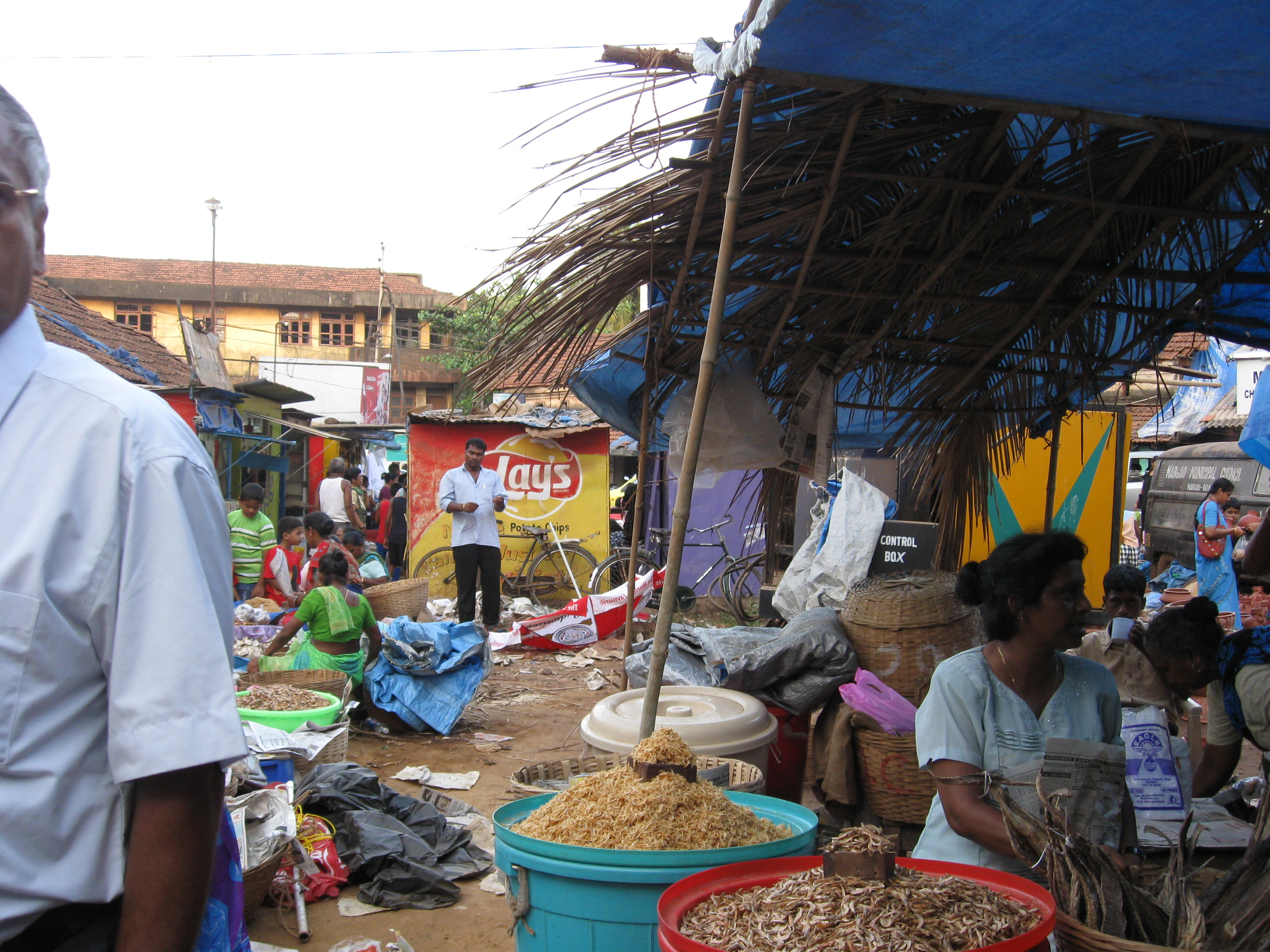
Fish Market

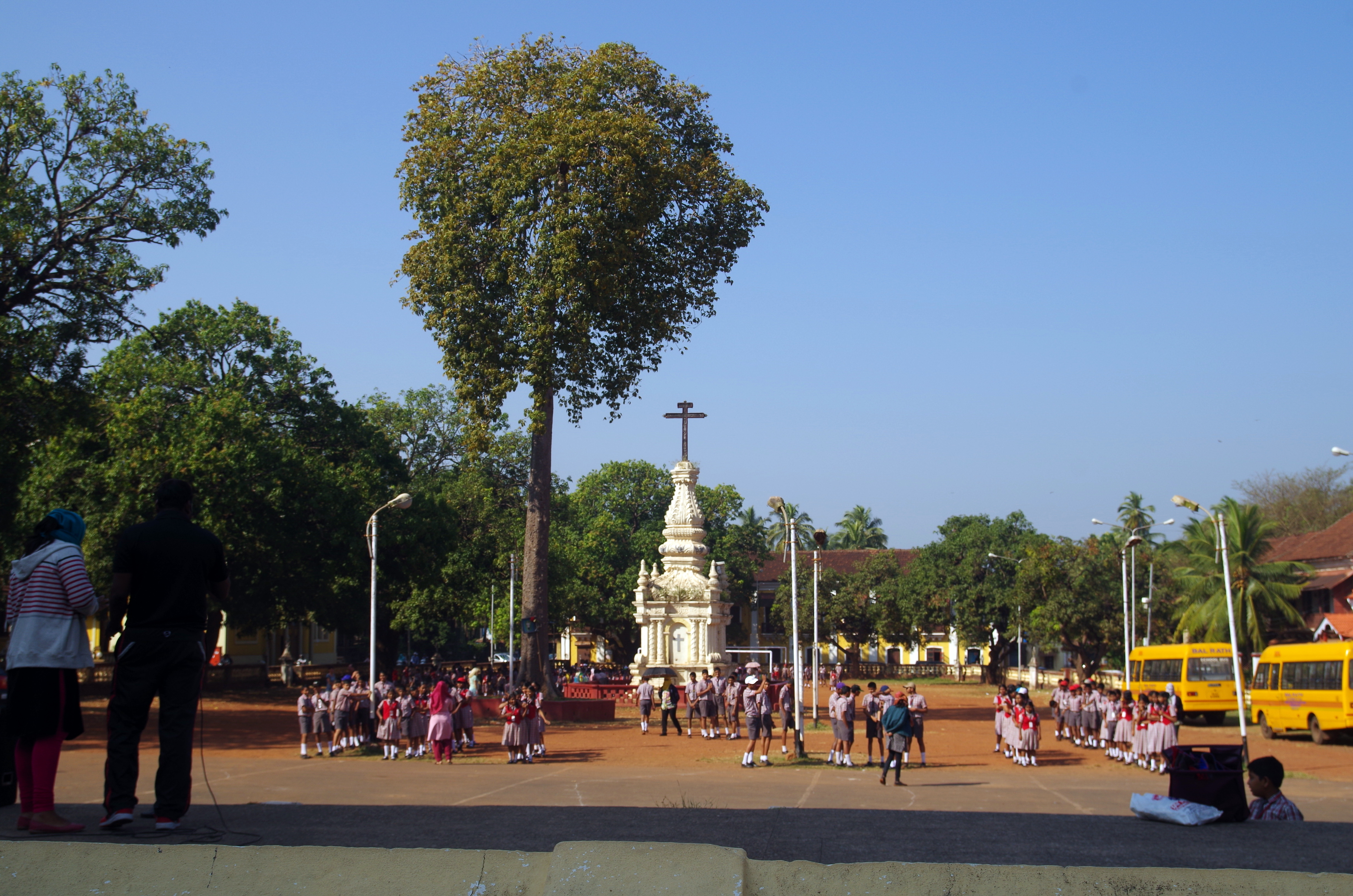
Casa de Saúde, Margao

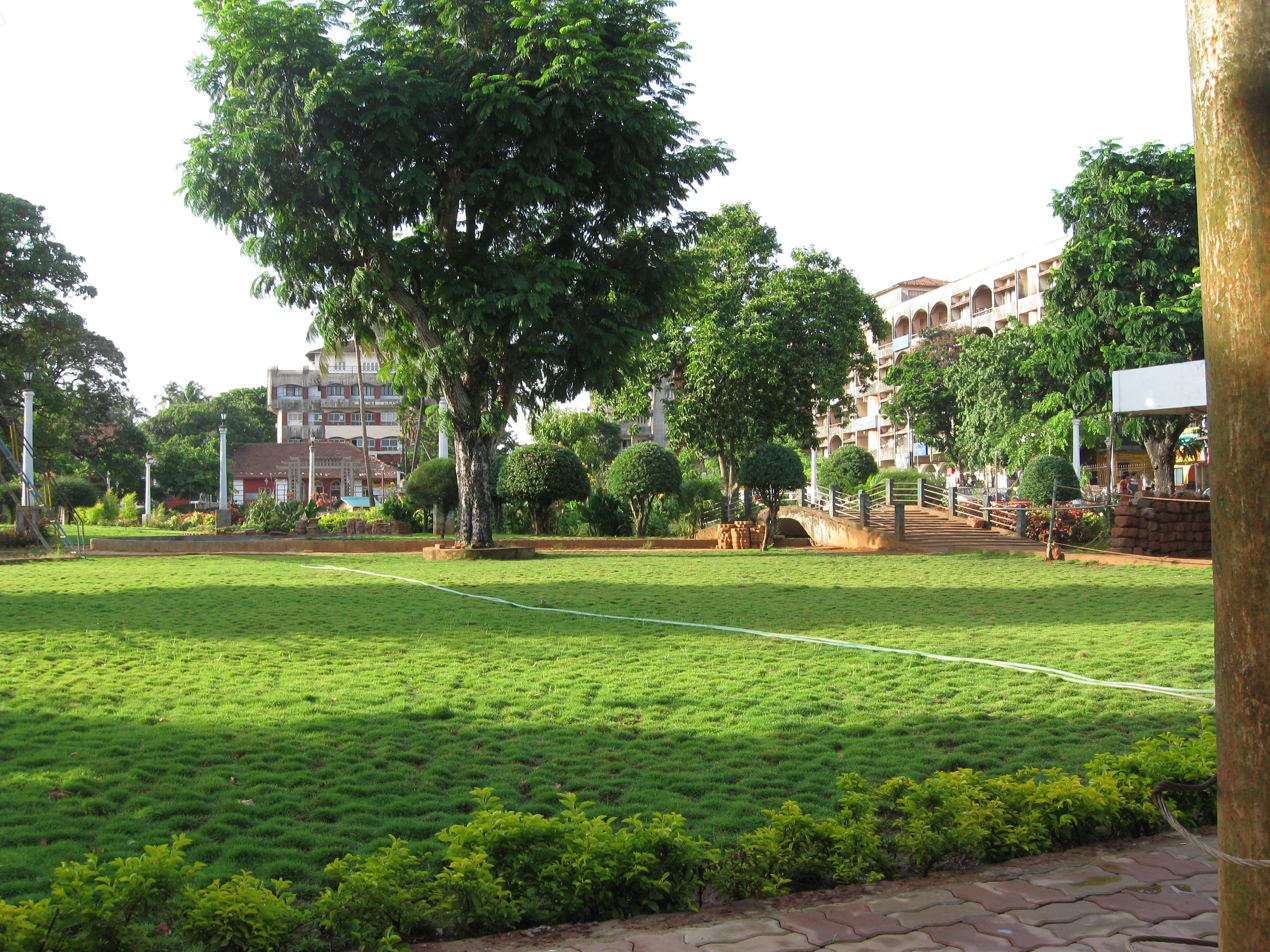
Margao Municipal Park

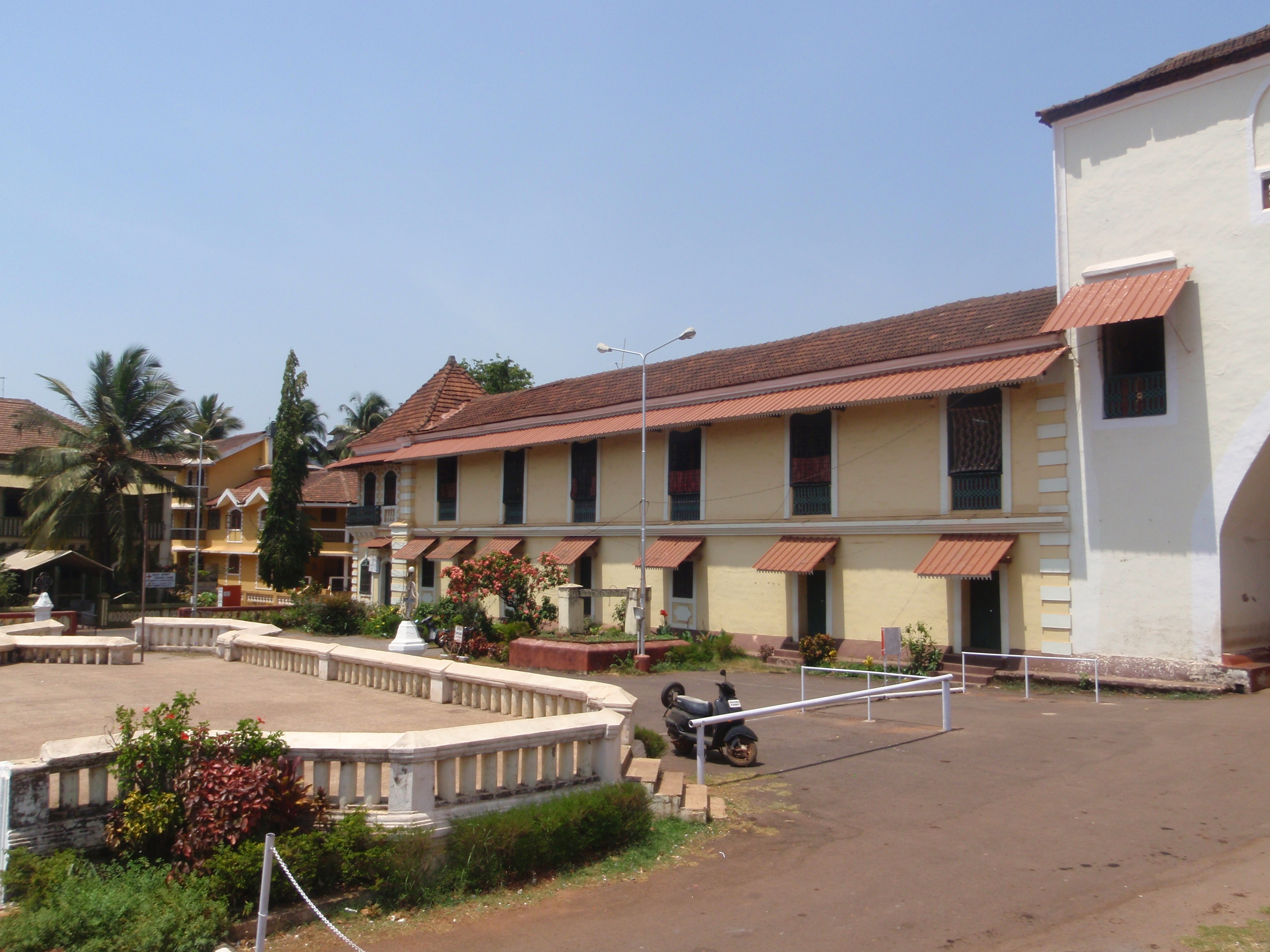
Margao, India

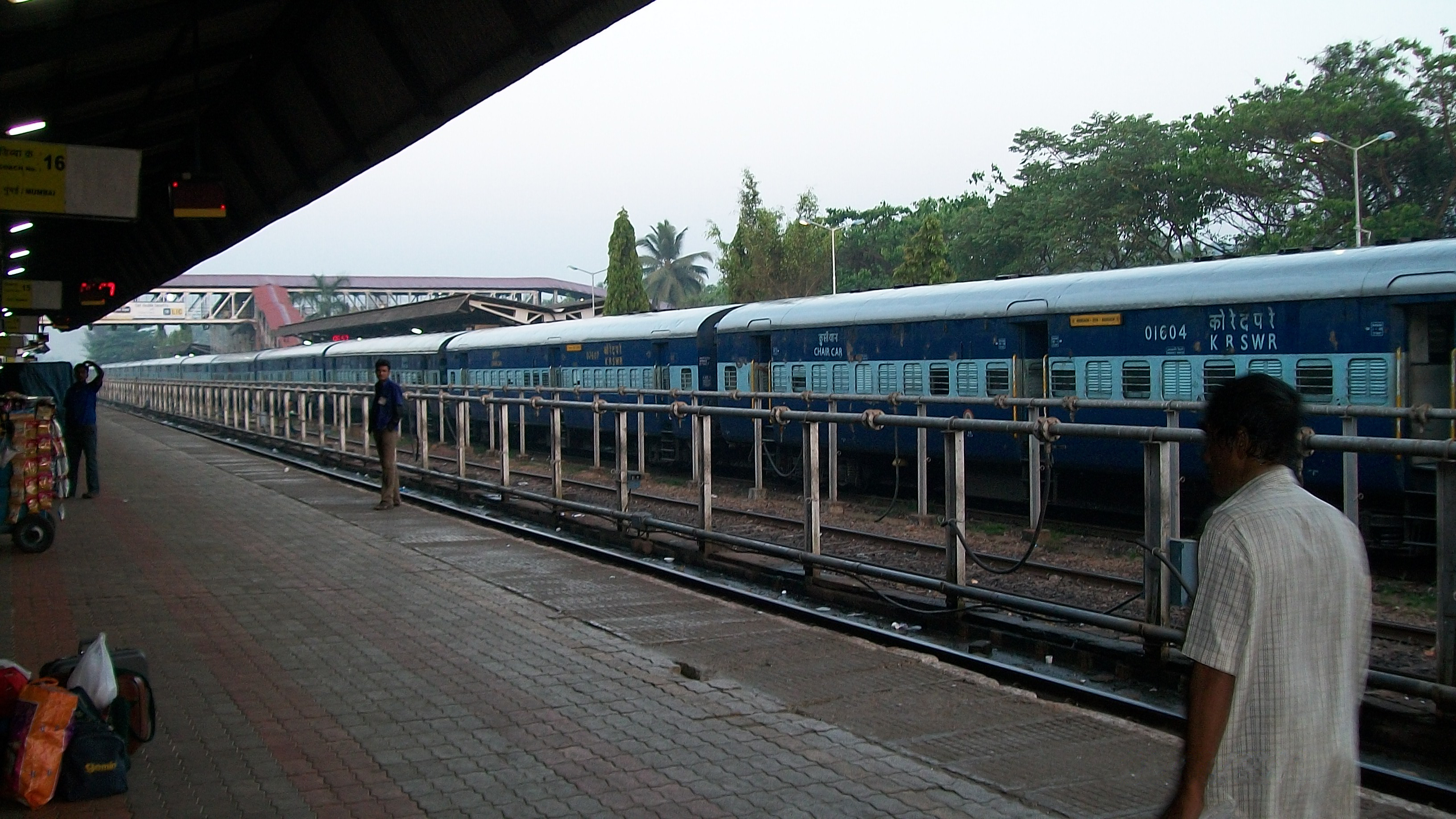
Margao Station Main Platform

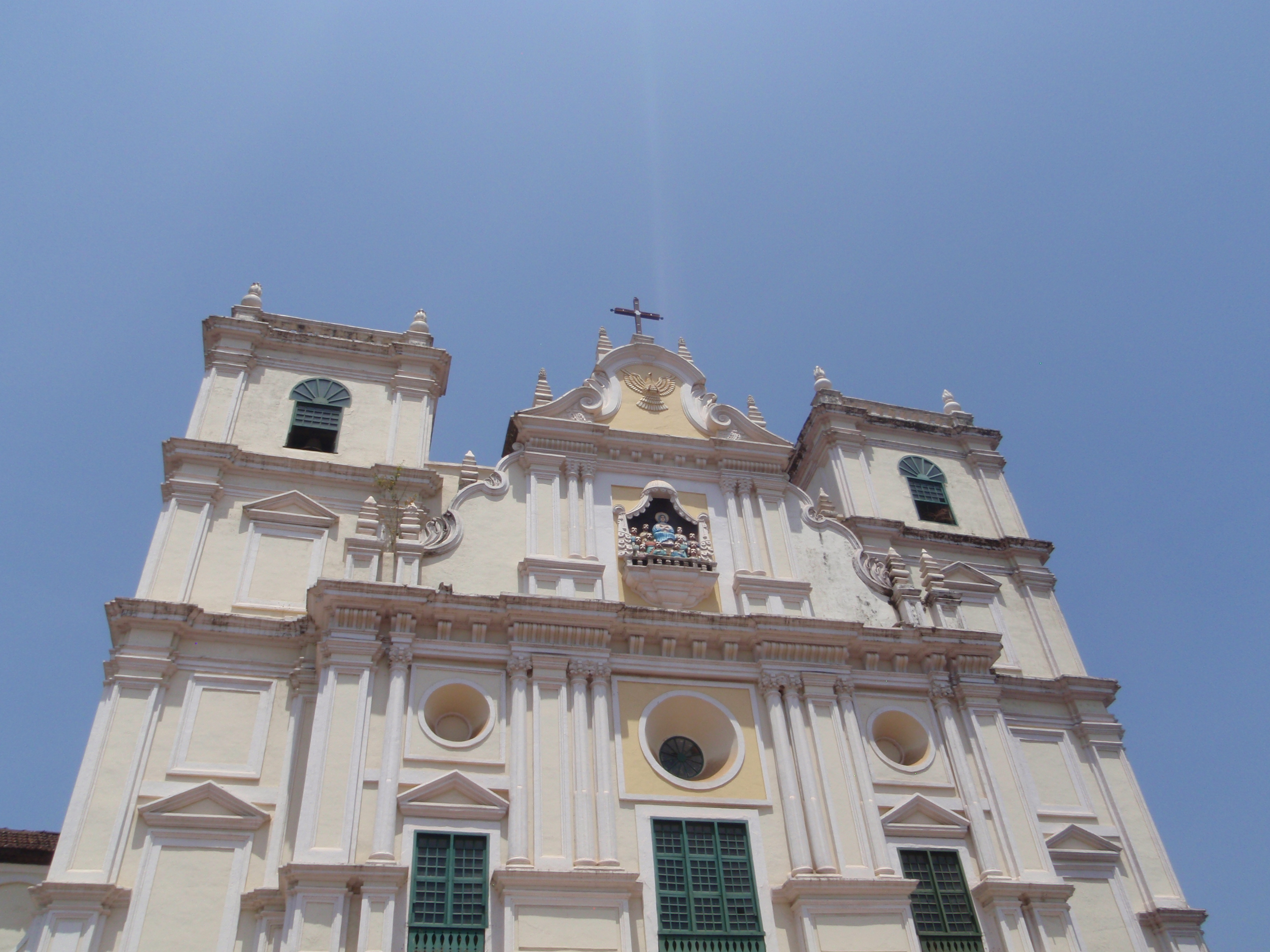
Igreja do Espírito Santo, Holy Spirit Church, Margão

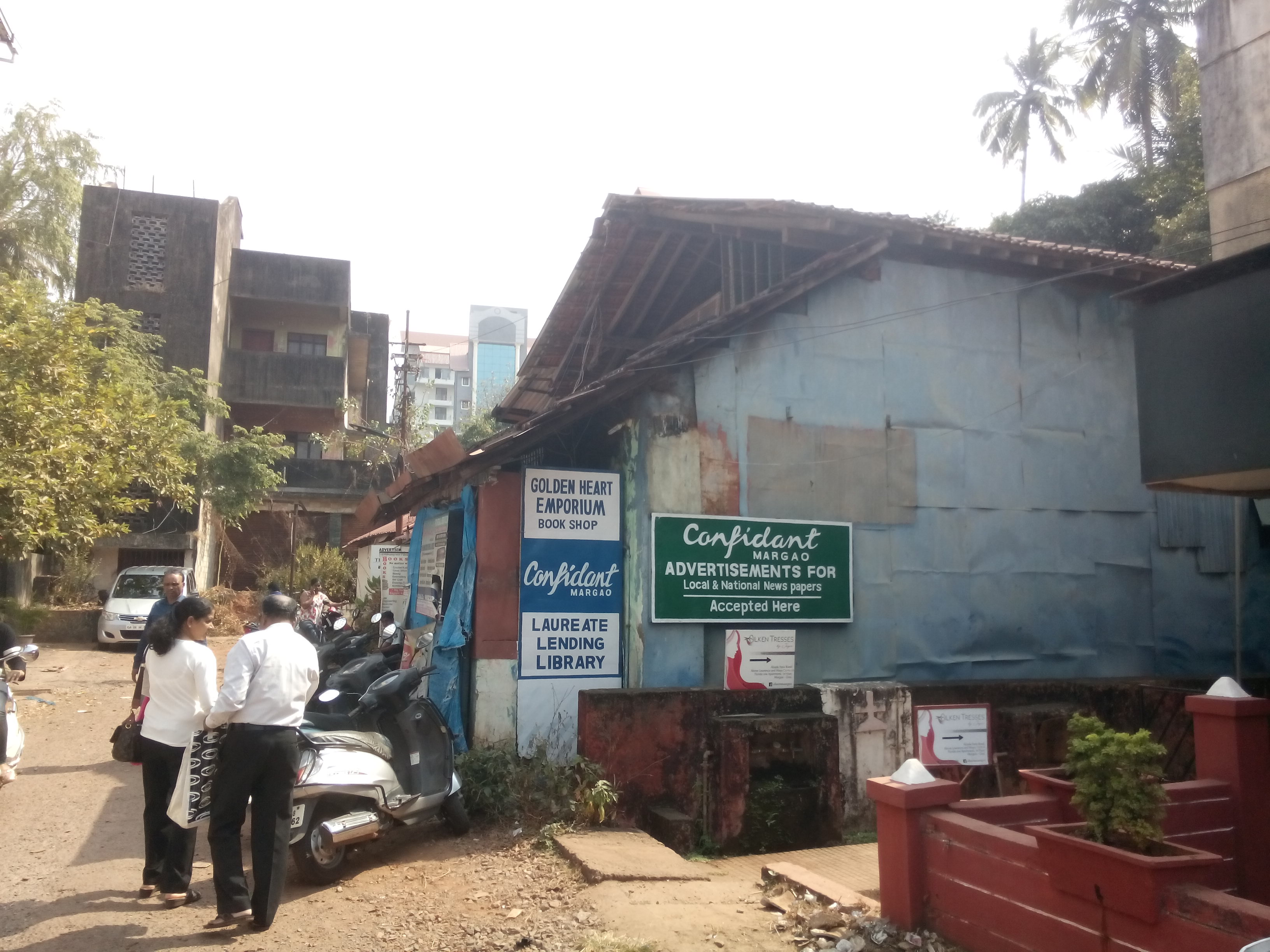
Confidant House, Margao, west elevation. The building contains a library and bookshops.

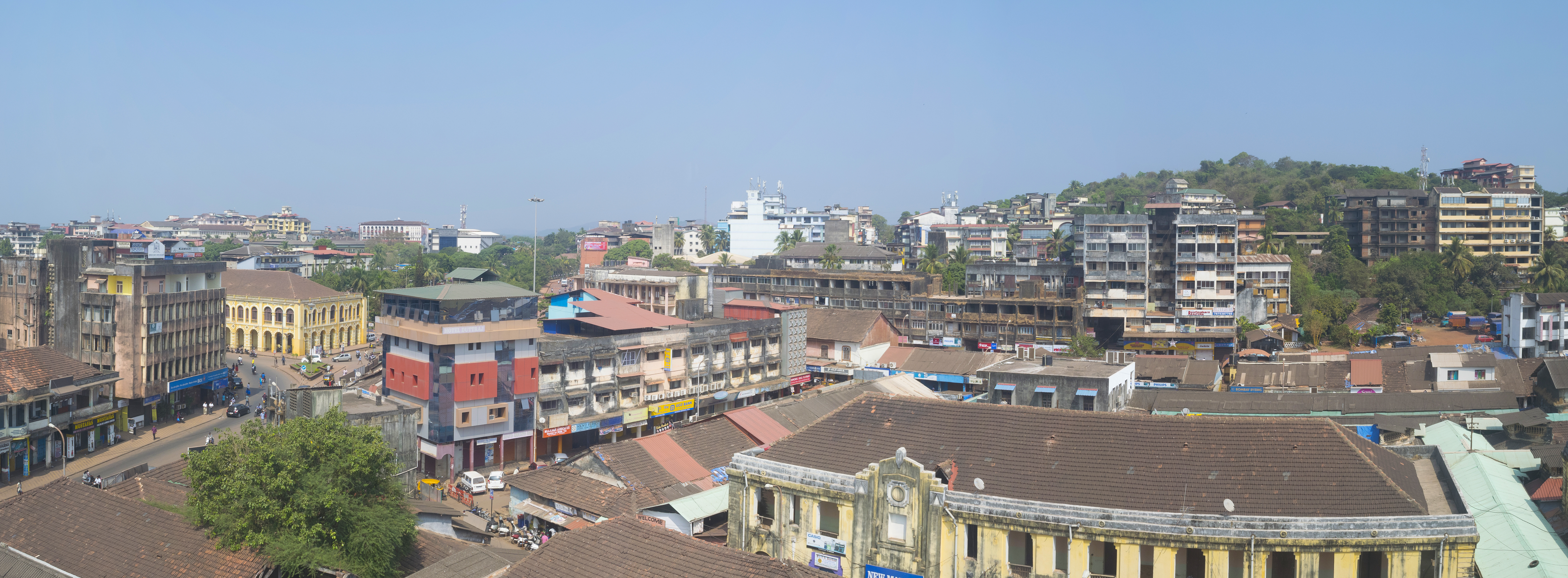
Margao, India

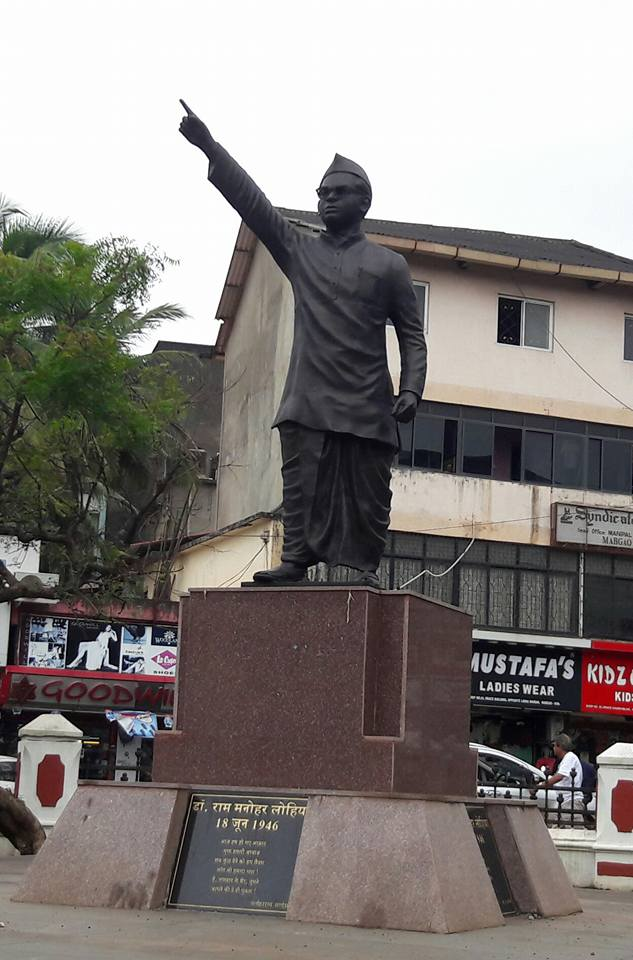
Statue of Ram Manohar Lohia in Lohia Maidan

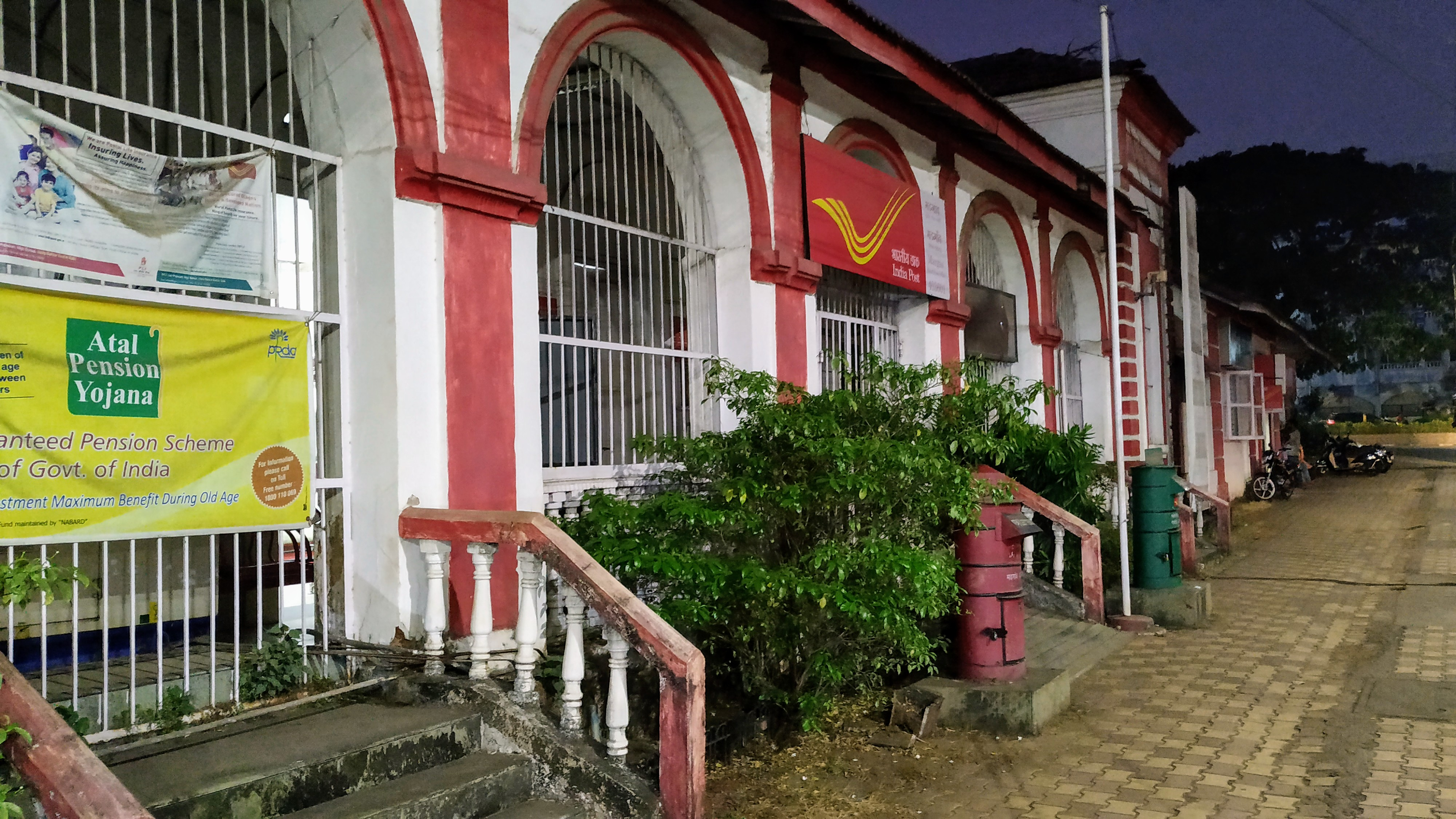
Margao Post Office

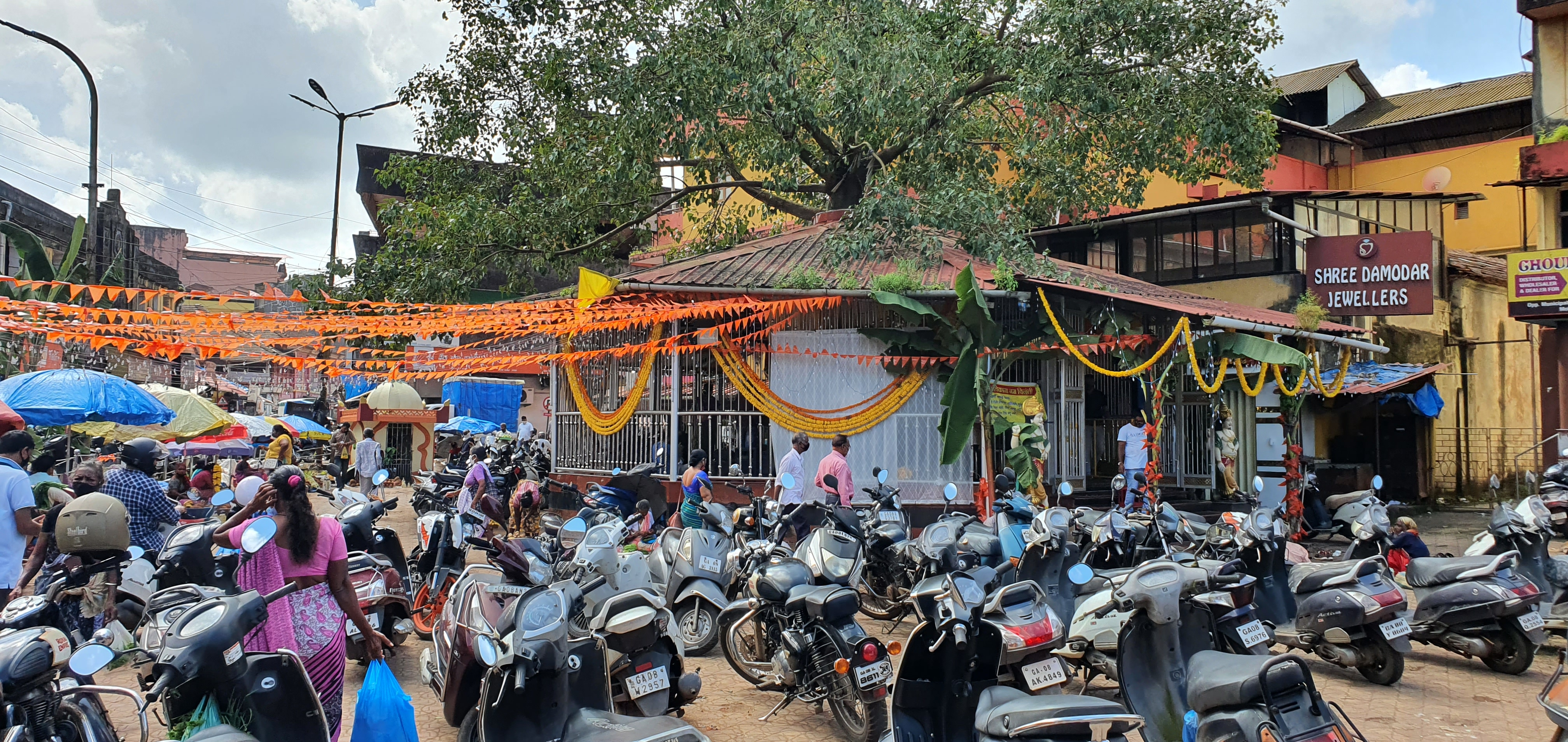
Damodar Temple near Pipal Katta

== See also ==
Madgaon (MAO)
Next 'Small' station towards Mumbai: Majorda	Konkan Railway : Railway (India)	Next 'Small' station from Mangalore: Balli
Next 'Small' station towards Mumbai: Majorda	Distance from Mumbai(CST) = 765 km	Next 'Small' station from Mangalore: Balli
Next 'Main' station towards Mumbai: Kudal	Konkan Railway : Railway (India)	Next 'Main' station from Mangalore; Karwar
