= Comba, Goa =

Comba Komb
- suburb
- Location in Goa, India Comba (India)
- Coordinates: 15.2763°N 73.9544°E
- Country: India
- State: Goa
- District: South Goa
- Sub-district: Salcete

Languages
  - Official: Konkani
- Time zone: UTC+5:30 (IST)
- PIN: 403601
- Vehicle registration: GA

Comba (Komb) is a town and suburb of the city of Margao in South Goa district in the state of Goa, India close to the city of Margao.

Comba is famous for Margao's well-known temple-hall "Dambaab Saal".It has Damodar Temple along with Ram temple. The initial settlement of Margao grew from the site of the ancient Damodar Temple.At the centre of Comba there is a famous Vithal Mandir. Dedicated to the deity - Shree Vithal Rakhumayi Dindi (festival) has been celebrated in Margao since 1909, starting from Kartikein Maha-ekadashi, coinciding with the Pandharpur zatra held in Maharashtra the hometown of the deity. The Dindi festival at the Vithal Rakhumai temple in Comba occurs on the second day after Diwali. The main celebration of Dindi to be held includes the annual procession of the palanquin with the deity, commencing from Shree Hari Mandir Devasthan (Margao) and slowly passing through the entire Margao town, to reach the Shree Vithal-Rakhumayi temple at Comba. The feast of the Holy Spirit Church, Margao (located at Comba), locally known as Purumetache fest occurs just before the monsoons set in. People from all over Goa congregate at the special market to buy spices and dried fish to be used during the oncoming rainy season. Comba has a number of schools such as Mahila and Nutan, Popular, and Damodar higher secondary college.

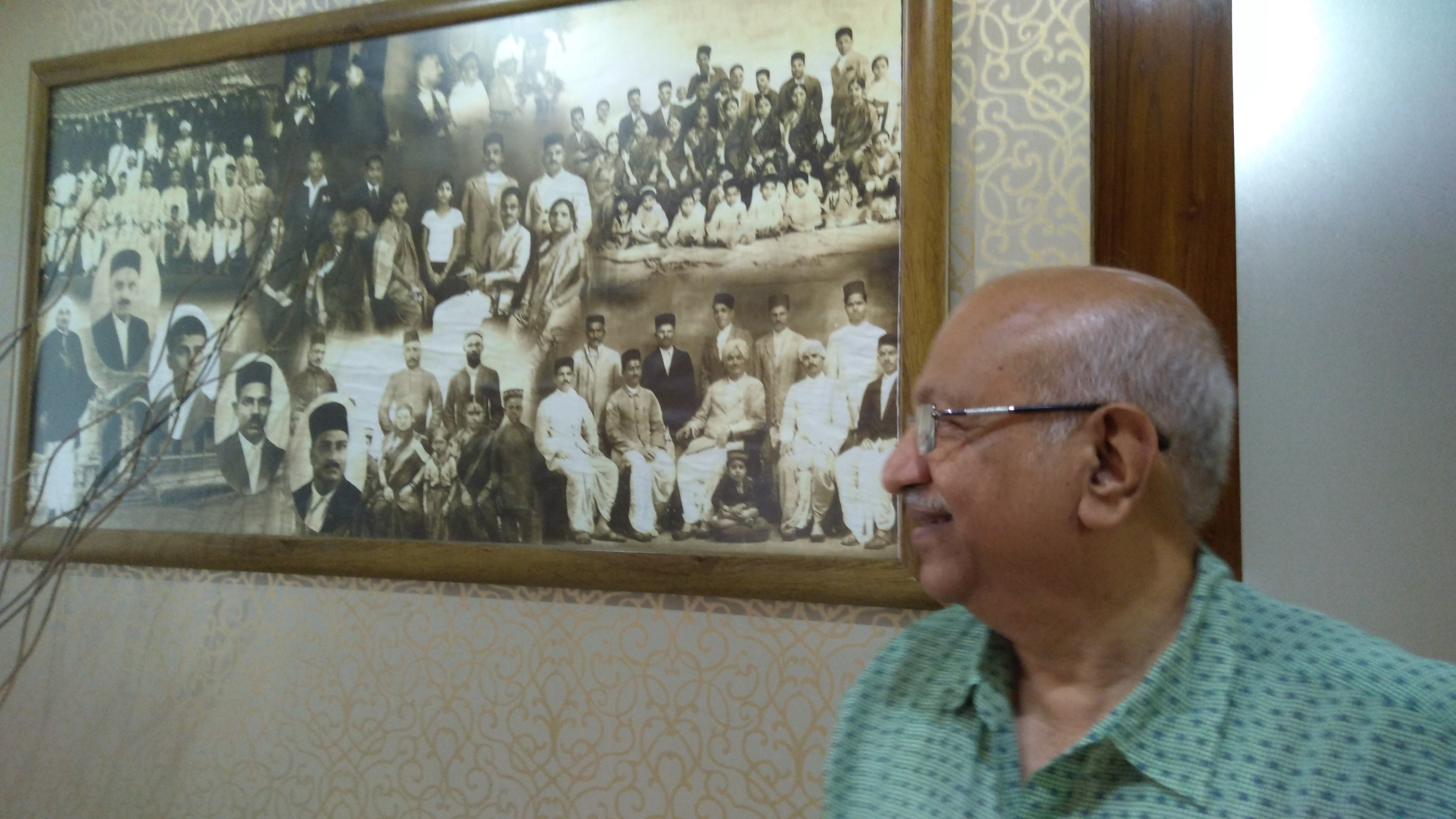
Datta Naik, Comba's Famous author

== Education ==
- Shree Damodar Higher Secondary School of Science
- Vidya Vikas Academy
- Damodar College of Commerce and Economics
- Govind Ramnath Kare College of Law
- Ramacrisna Madeva Salgaocar Higher Secondary School
- Loyola High School
- Mahila and Nutan English High School
- Popular High school
