= Gogol, Goa =

Gogol
- suburb
- Location of Gogol in Goa Gogol (India)
- Coordinates: 15.28795°N 73.96595°E
- Country: India
- State: Goa
- District: South Goa
- Sub-district: Salcete

Languages
  - Official: Konkani
- Time zone: UTC+5:30 (IST)
- PIN: 403 601
- Area code: 0832
- Vehicle registration: GA

Gogol is a town and suburb of the city of Margao in South Goa district in the state of Goa, India. Gogol is a well connected suburb with good infrastructure such as schools, colleges, post office, banks, public transport, shopping areas close to Margao city.

== Education ==
Parvatibai Chowgule College of Arts and Science and Manovikas English Medium School are situated in Gogol.

== Landmarks and Attractions ==
Chinmaya Mission Ashram and Good News Church which is also known as Goa Community Centre are located in Gogol.

== Transport ==
The nearest airport to Gogol is Dabolim Airport which is 26 km away from it. The nearest railway station is around 5 km away from Gogol.

== See also ==
- Margao
- Panaji
