= Portuguese language in Goa =

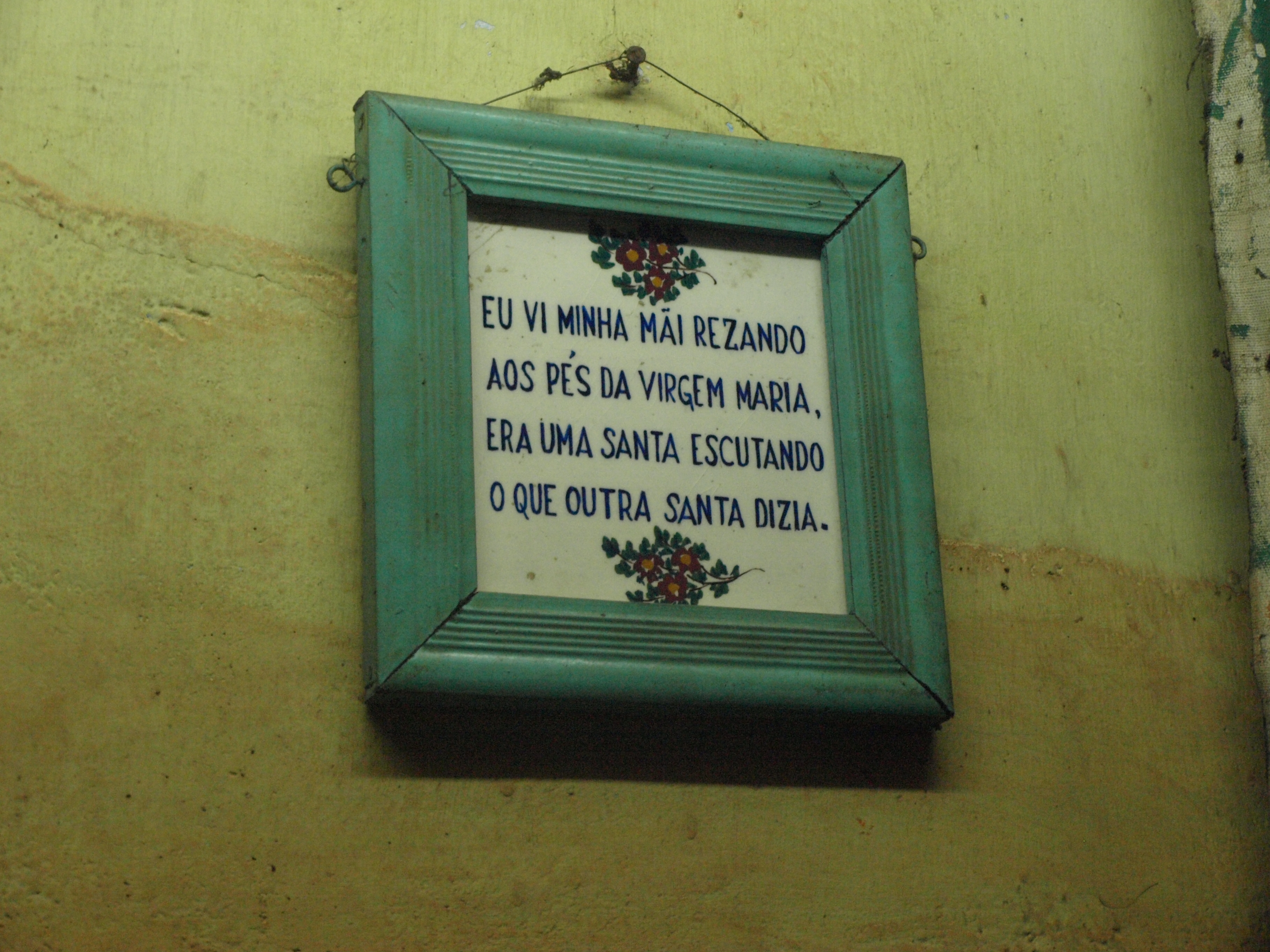
A framed rhyme in old Portuguese orthography, Goa. "I saw my mother praying at the feet of the Virgin Mary. She was a saint listening to what another saint was saying." In modern Portuguese "mãi" would be spelt "mãe".

The Portuguese language has been used in Goa since the early 16th century, following the establishment of Portuguese rule, and continues to be spoken today, although by a small minority of the population. Portuguese administration in Goa continued from 1510 until 1961, when the region was annexed into the Indian Republic. While it retains a role in certain religious contexts, the language is still studied, with around 1,500 students learning Portuguese in Goa in 2015; totaling a number of 10,000 – 12,000 Portuguese speakers in the state. Another informal estimate cites the number at about 8,000 speakers, however there is no formal trustworthy source for the number of Portuguese speakers in Goa.

== History ==
The history of the Portuguese language in Goa dates back to the 15th century, with the arrival of Portuguese explorers and the establishment of Portuguese rule in the region, which lasted for around 450 years. During the period of the Estado Português da Índia (Portuguese State of India), the language was used extensively in both administration and education. Beyond official use, it was also used by religious missionaries, although in everyday life it coexisted alongside other local languages.

== Post-annexation of Goa ==
Portuguese rule in Goa came to an end in 1961 after the Indian annexation of Goa. The language faced a very difficult turning point: Portuguese ceased to be the official language, was no longer mandatory, and largely fell out of use.

O Heraldo, the Portuguese-language daily newspaper in Goa, was renamed to Herald and adopted the use of English in 1983 (the paper has since changed its name back to O Heraldo following its 125 Years anniversary). Portuguese was used along with English in subordinate legislation in the State Gazette until the year 1972, when it was replaced by Marathi and Konkani. Portuguese remained one of the languages of the Subordinate Courts along with Marathi and Konkani until 1969. In 1964, under the aegis of the Bombay High Court, a program was started to retrain Goan judges, lawyers, and court officials, to write and understand pleadings in English, to enable the eventual abolition of Portuguese as language of pleadings in 1969–70.

In 1974, following the Carnation Revolution in Portugal, diplomatic relations between Portugal and India were restored, with the installation the Consulate-General in Panaji in 1992, followed by institutions such as the Fundação Oriente in 1995, and the Instituto Camões a few years later. Because of this, significant institutional support for the Portuguese language in Goa resumed.

== Other legacies ==
The long presence of the language in this Indian state, in addition to a small number of speakers, has left other legacies. These include street names, the name of the most populous Goan city of Vasco da Gama, and family surnames like Mascarenhas and Souza (at times appearing as D'Souza), which are quite common in Goa.

It's debatable whether the Goan territory ever formed an Indo-Portuguese Creole, unlike other regions of India — as well as in Africa, Sri Lanka (formerly Ceylon), Macau, Malacca, Indonesia, and Timor-Leste — where several Portuguese-based creole languages emerged due to the prolonged contact of Portuguese with local languages — creoles that in most cases gradually disappeared centuries after the end of Portuguese rule.

Some authors such as Theban (1985) and Tomás (1995) consider, contrary to Holm (1989) and Clemens (1996, 2000), that the very strong pressure of the Portuguese language, as the official and educational language, would have prevented the formation of a Portuguese creole in Goa. However, according to Rita Marquilhas (1998), in places that remained under Portuguese administration until the mid-20th century, such as Goa, there was a ‘decreolization,’ as various structures of the language gradually came closer to the Portuguese spoken in Portugal, leaving only traces in what is now the variety of Portuguese spoken by some Goan communities.

The very Goan identity itself remains linked to various other legacies left by Portuguese colonization, such as Goa’s distinctive characteristics, with a way of life different from the rest of the country.

In addition, there is the presence of architectural and culinary elements, as well as a large and significant Catholic community, which consists of most native Goans. After 1961 immigration from other parts of India changed the demographics of Goa leading to the native Goans becoming 25-30% of the population and the majority of the state following Hinduism, an estimated 25% to 30% of the 1.4 million living in Goa are Catholic. Although the majority religion in India is Hinduism, 30% of the 1.4 million Goans are Catholic. However, in 1961, at the time of Goa’s annexation by India, Catholics represented 58% of the total population. As of 2011, after 50 years of integration into India, the Catholic community has declined noticeably. Churches, convents, and Portuguese forts are spread throughout the territory of Goa, adding even more diversity to a country that is already rich in contrasts, as is the case in India.

== Current situation ==
Despite centuries of domination exercised by Portugal, unlike what happened in other Portuguese colonies elsewhere, the Portuguese language failed to spread among the vast majority of the population, remaining as the language of administration and a small literate elite. It is estimated that less than 1.5% of the population used it as their mother tongue.

However, many Goans used Portuguese as their second language, compelled by its mandatory use in state administration and religious activities. Today, the situation of Portuguese in Goa is much more critical. With each generation, the number of speakers has declined drastically. Since the end of Portuguese rule in 1961, the Portuguese language has been progressively replaced by Konkani (the official language of Goa), and especially by English (one of the two official languages of India’s federal administration), which became a major medium for education and opportunity, replacing Portuguese as a modernity.

Currently, Portuguese is spoken by a small community in Goa. Although it is uncertain what the exact number of people in Goa who can speak the language is, some estimates suggest this figure is between 3% and 5% of the total population. Recently, there have been attempts to revive the language in Goa, including pilot projects in secondary schools, and initiatives in the arts and tourism sectors. Currently, the Portuguese language is taught in both public and private education.

This started a reversal trend, where Portuguese has been encouraged and offered as an optional language in schools, with the support of Fundação Oriente. Goa University offers a master's degree in Portuguese studies since 1988, being the only university in the Indian subcontinent to offer a BA and MA in Portuguese. There are also many free courses to promote the Portuguese language, such as the Communicare Trust in Dona Paula, Instituto Camões in the capital city of Panjim, Centre for Portuguese Language & Culture (CPLC) at Parvatibai Chowgule College in Margao, and Indo-Portuguese Friendship Society in Altinho, Panjim.

According to the director of Instituto Camões and reader at the Goa University Delfim Correia da Silva, there is a gradual and steady increase in the number of pupils learning Portuguese in Goa, a trend that has been found to have significantly increased over the last eight to ten years. According to Silva, the number of students enrolling in Portuguese in schools grew from around 20 students in 2010 to nearly 200 students in 2017, with a similar upward increase in M.A. Portuguese enrollments as well. This trend is driven mainly by cultural reasons, such as communicating with family, and professional reasons, such as for opportunities in law, historical research, travel and tourism, translation, as well as in business linked to Brazil, Portugal, Mozambique, Angola, and the rest of the CPLP.

In Goa, the small number of Portuguese language speakers are united by a desire to affirm their identity and strengthen the bonds of their long encounter with the Portuguese language. Even today, the language still serves as a marker of prestige and social status: those who speak Portuguese are seen as coming from good families. Currently as of 2026, Portuguese is still taught in Goa-board schools as an optional language from 8th standard to 12th standard.

Although, due to the National Education Policy 2020 (NEP), the language's future in Goa Board schools is uncertain, as the NEP 2020's three-language formula only allows students the option of one "foreign language" slot (with English also being classified as a foreign language here). These norms have been relaxed for 2026-2027 in Goa, allowing the continuation of the Portuguese language as an optional subject in schools, for the time being.

== See also ==
- Instituto Camões
- Goan Catholics
- Archdiocese of Goa and Damaon
- Konkani language agitation
- Konkani language
- India–Portugal relations
- Luso-Indians
- Portuguese language in Asia
- Norteiro Indo-Portuguese languages
- Lusophonia Games
- RTP Internacional (now RTP Mundo)
- Sporting Clube de Goa
- Indians in Portugal
- British Goans
- Fundação Oriente
- Goa State Central Library
- Portuguese East Indies
