= Indians in Portugal =

Ethnic group

Total population
- 104,000 – 120,000

Regions with significant populations
- Lisbon District · Faro District · Beja District · Santarém District · Setúbal District · Leiria District · Porto District

Languages
- Portuguese · Konkani · Gujarati · Punjabi · English · Hindi

Religion
- Christianity (Roman Catholicism) · Hinduism · Sikhism · Islam · Jainism

Related ethnic groups
- Konkani people, Non-resident Indian and person of Indian origin, Desi, Nepali, Indian immigration to Brazil, Indians in Spain

Indians in Portugal, including recent immigrants and people who trace their ancestry back to India, together number around 104,000 (2024 Indian Ministry of External Affairs data) − 120,000 (2021 Indian embassy data). They thus constitute 0.98% – 1.13% of the total population of Portugal.

In the 6 years between 2018 and 2023 around 45,000 Indians have settled the country, mostly in the Lisbon metropolitan area, Porto, the Algarve and the Districts of Beja, Santarém and Leiria.

The majority of Indians in Portugal trace their background to Goa, Daman and Diu, Gujarat and, more recently, from Punjab and Haryana.

== History ==
In sixteenth century southern Portugal, there were Chinese slaves but the number of them was described as "negligible", being outnumbered by East Indian, Mourisco, and African slaves. Amerindians, Chinese, Malays, and Indians were slaves in Portugal but in far fewer number than Turks, Berbers and Arabs. China and Malacca were origins of slaves delivered to Portugal by Portuguese viceroys.

A Portuguese woman, Dona Ana de Ataíde owned an Indian man named António as a slave in Évora. He served as a cook for her. Ana de Ataíde's Indian slave escaped from her in 1587. A large number of slaves were forcibly brought there since the commercial, artisanal, and service sectors all flourished in a regional capital like Évora. Rigorous and demanding tasks were assigned to Mourisco, Chinese, and Indian slaves. Chinese, Mouriscos, and Indians were among the ethnicities of prized slaves and were much more expensive compared to blacks, so high class individuals owned these ethnicities.

A fugitive Indian slave from Evora named António went to Badajoz after leaving his master in 1545. António was among the three most common male names given to male slaves in Evora.

Antão Azedo took an Indian slave named Heitor to Evora, who along with another slave was from Bengal were among the 34 Indian slaves in total who were owned by Tristão Homem, a nobleman in 1544 in Evora. Manuel Gomes previously owned a slave who escaped in 1558 at age 18 and he was said to be from the "land of Prester John of the Indias" named Diogo.

In Evora, men were owned and used as slaves by female establishments like convents for nuns. A capelão do rei, father João Pinto left an Indian man in Porto where he was picked up in 1546 by the Evora-based Santa Marta convent's nuns to serve as their slave. However, female slaves did not serve in male establishments, unlike vice versa.

Japanese Christian Daimyos were mainly responsible for selling to the Portuguese their fellow Japanese. Japanese women and Japanese men, Javanese, Chinese, and Indians were all sold as slaves in Portugal.

Traits such as high intelligence were ascribed to Indians, Chinese, and Japanese slaves.

== Notable people with Indian ancestry ==
- Kalidás Barreto - Former Portuguese politician
- Mariano Barreto - Portuguese football manager
- Otelo Saraiva de Carvalho – Former Portuguese military officer
- Matheus de Castro – First Indian bishop of the Catholic church
- Narana Coissoró- Portuguese Speaker of the House
- Alfredo Bruto da Costa – Former Portuguese politician
- Alfredo Nobre da Costa- Former Prime Minister of Portugal
- Antonio Costa – former Prime Minister of Portugal
- Orlando da Costa – Portuguese writer
- José Pereira Coutinho – Macanese politician
- Ileana D'Cruz – Portuguese actress who predominantly appears in Hindi, Telugu, and Tamil language films
- Mortó Dessai – Portuguese- medical analyst
- Rogério de Faria – Portuguese-Brazilian businessman
- Catarina Furtado – Portuguese television presenter
- André Lacximicant – Footballer for Estoril Praia
- João Leão – Former Finance Minister of Portugal
- André Pereira dos Reis – Portuguese captain, pilot and cartographer
- Gabriel Mithá Ribeiro – Portuguese politician
- Rosendo Ribeiro – Portuguese physician and diplomat
- António de Bettencourt Rodrigues – doctor, Portuguese diplomat and politician
- Manuel António de Sousa – Portuguese merchant
- Sabrina De Sousa – Portuguese-American ex-CIA operative
- Teotónio de Souza – Portuguese historian and the founder-director of the Xavier Centre of Historical Research (XCHR), at Alto Porvorim
- Jorge Barreto Xavier – Portuguese cultural manager, university professor and politician

== See also ==
- Hinduism in Portugal
- Immigration to Portugal
- Indian diaspora
- India–Portugal relations
- Romani people in Portugal
