= Kanji Malam =

Indian sailor

Kanji Malam was an Indian sailor and trader. He was known for his crucial role in helping Portuguese marine navigator and explorer Vasco da Gama to find him the route from Cape of Good Hope to reach Kerala.

== History ==
As per the historical evidences, Kanji Malam hailed from Mandvi, a shipbuilding hub (port town in Gujarat), in the Kutch district of the western Indian state of Gujarat. According to local legend, he had left Gujarat and settled in Africa. According to historians, it was during the time of Kanji Malam's permanent residency in Africa, he had met the Portuguese marine navigator and explorer Vasco da Gama. Eventually, Kanji Malam guided Vasco da Gama to Calicut from Malindi on east African coast. In 1497, Vasco da Gama is said to have discovered the Europe-to-India which changed the course of history, largely due to the support he gained from Kanji Malam, who showed him the route from the East African coasts of Mozambique sailing onwards to Calicut (present day Kozhikode in Kerala) off the Malabar Coast in India. It was believed that Kanji Malam had strong proficiency on the sea navigation routes which had impressed Vasco da Gama.

Portuguese records have mentioned the name of Kanji Malam as Malemo Cana/Malemo Cana, with a description of him being defined as a skilled Gujarati navigator.

== Legacy ==
His little known story of sea navigation has been inscribed as an exhibit at Indian Naval Maritime Museum at INS Dronacharya, Kochi.

During Indian Prime Minister Narendra Modi's official state visit to Portugal in 2017, in a bid to strengthen the bilateral relations between India and Portugal, Modi delivered a keynote speech addressing the Indian diaspora community in Lisbon, where he emphasized and highlighted the role of Kanji Malam who had assisted Vasco da Gama to find a sea route in order to initiate trade activities. Narendra Modi narrated the story insisting that the role of Kanji Malam had turned out to be a catalyst in the cultural exchange between India and Portugal which propelled to build India's trade relations with Portugal.
