= André Pereira =

André Pereira may refer to:

== Sportspeople ==
- André Pereira (swimmer) (born 1993), Brazilian swimmer
- Andre Pereira da Silva (born 1980), Brazilian distance runner at the 1999 South American Cross Country Championships
- André Pereira (basketball) (born 1979), Brazilian basketball player at the 2003 Pan American Games
- André Pereira (footballer), Portuguese football forward
- Andre Pereira (snowboarder), Brazilian snowboarder at the 2014 Winter Paralympics
- André Pereira (steeplechase runner) (born 1995), Portuguese steeplechase runner and competitor at the 2015 European U23 Championships

== Others ==
- André Pereira dos Reis, 17th-century Portuguese captain, pilot, and cartographer
- André Ferreira Pereira, 16th-century governor of Angola
