= Madhav Pandit =

Indian educationist (1935–2017)

Madhav Vaman Pandit
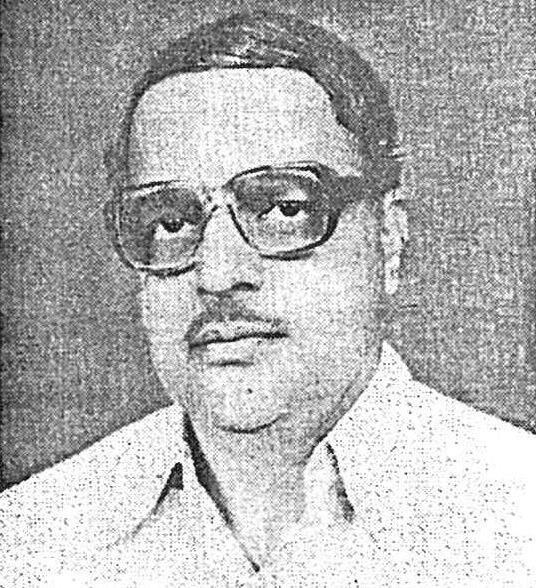
- Born: 24 April 1935; Opa-Khandepar, Portuguese Goa
- Died: 15 February 2017 (aged 81); Margao, Goa, India
- Occupations: Author, historian
- Movement: Goan independence movement
- Awards: National Teacher Award

Madhav Vaman Pandit (24 April 1935 – 15 February 2017) is an Indian educationist, musician, and independence activist from Goa. He worked extensively towards the propagation of the Hindi language in Goa and was a recipient of the National Teacher Award. He also participated actively in the Goan independence movement, for which he was imprisoned by the Portuguese administration.

== Early life and education ==
Madhav Vaman Pandit was born on 24 April 1935 in Opa-Khandepar, located in the Ponda taluka of Goa. Due to a lack of adequate educational infrastructure in his native village at the time, he moved to Pune to pursue his education. He completed his schooling up to matriculation, obtained a Secondary Teachers' Certificate (STC), and undertook studies in the Hindi language.

During his student years, Pandit was active in sports and gained recognition as a skilled school athlete. He also pursued music, receiving guidance from the noted harmonium player and musicologist Dr. Narayanrao Marulkar. He trained in playing the tabla and musical accompaniment under the tutelage of Shankarrao Limaye and Khansaheb Mehbub Khan, earning a reputation as a competent accompanying artist during his youth. In his spare time, he engaged in various community activities to assist the local public.

== Goan independence movement ==
Influenced by the ongoing anti-colonial sentiment in Goa, Pandit joined the freedom movement and served as a member of the 'National Congress Goa' committee from 1955 to 1961. On 15 August 1954, he participated in a mass demonstration organized to raise funds for the liberation movement.

He later traveled to Belgaum, which served as a primary hub for the Goan liberation activities. Alongside prominent freedom fighters Peter Alvares and Sindhutai Deshpande, Pandit visited multiple operational centers of the movement. On 16 September 1954, he took part in a march at the Terekhol Fort to mark 'Terekhol Day', where he was apprehended by the authorities. A Portuguese military court subsequently sentenced him to three years of rigorous imprisonment.

Pandit was initially detained for eight to ten months at the prison ward of the 'Manicom' Hospital in Panaji, before being transferred to the Reis Magos Fort. Following international interventions by Amnesty International, he was released along with other political prisoners on 19 January 1958. Post-release, he was required to report to his local police station once every month.

== Career in education and literature ==
In 1958, Pandit began working as a schoolteacher at the Shri Laxminarayan Vidyalaya in Savoi-Verem. Between 1959 and 1962, he returned to Pune to undergo professional teacher training. Following this, in 1962, he was appointed as a Hindi language teacher at the Mahila and Nutan Marathi Vidyalaya. He later served as a member of the Board of Studies for the Goa Board of Secondary and Higher Secondary Education.

Pandit authored a Marathi book on education titled Govyatil Madhyamik Shikshan (Secondary Education in Goa) in 1984, which received an award from the Gomant Vidya Niketan. He also served as the editor for the quarterly publication Secondary Education in Goa.

== Language promotion and music ==
Pandit worked towards promoting Hindi across Goa. In 1965–66, he was appointed to the governing council of the Maharashtra Rashtrabhasha Sabha. In recognition of his institutional work, the joint recommendations of the central and state governments led to his appointment to the Hindi Advisory Committee of the Government of India in 1977.

As a writer, he contributed several Hindi essays and articles to journals such as Gomanchal (a quarterly by the Gomantak Rashtrabhasha Vidyapeeth), Sangeetkala Vihar, and Delhi (a monthly magazine published by the Delhi Administration). He was also a member of the editorial board for Gomanchal.

In the field of music, Pandit was instrumental in founding the 'Swaramanch' music academy in Margao in 1964. He also contributed to the establishment of the Kala Academy Goa and its affiliated College of Music.

== Awards and accolades ==
- Tamrapatra: Awarded by the Government of India for his contributions to the Indian independence and Goa liberation movements.
- National Teacher Award: Presented to him on 5 September 1989 by the then Vice President of India, Shankar Dayal Sharma.

== Personal life ==
Pandit was married to Hemlata. Together, they had two sons, Gautam and Dattatray.

== Death ==
Pandit died in Margao on 15 February 2017 after a brief illness.
