= Hinduism in Portugal =

Hindus in Portugal
Total population
- 19,471 (2021)▲; 0.22% of total population

Regions with significant populations
- All Over Portugal

Religions
- Hinduism

Related ethnic groups
- Indians in Portugal and Hindus

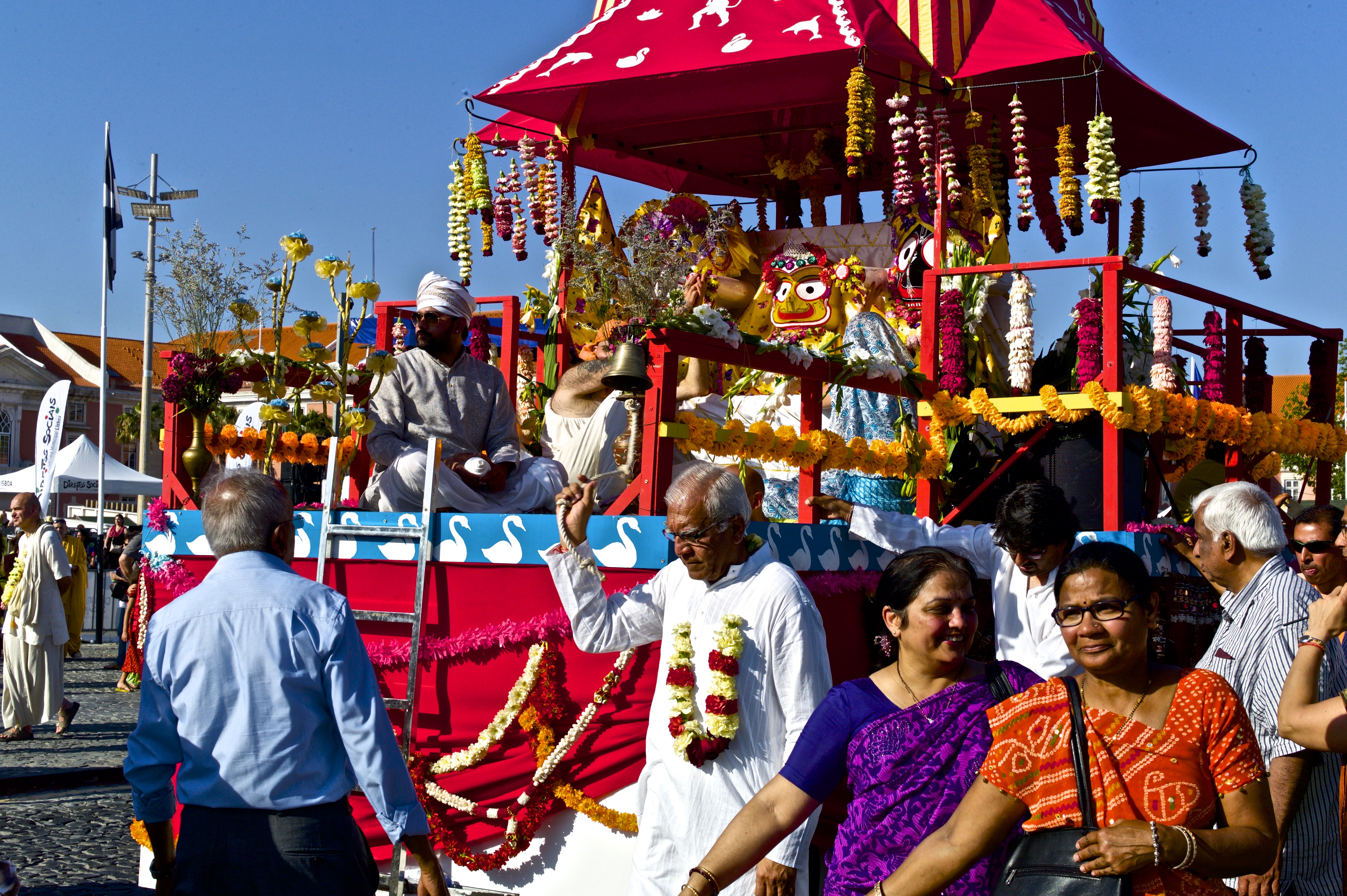
Hindu Rath Yatra festival in Lisbon Portugal

Hinduism is a minority religion in Portugal. The 2021 census recorded 19,471 Hindus among residents aged 15 and over, or roughly 0.2% of that population, making Hinduism one of the larger non-Christian religions in a country where about 80% of the population identifies as Roman Catholic.

The Hindu community's presence is closely tied to Portugal's colonial relationship with India (Estado da Índia). Most Portuguese Hindus descend from Gujaratis who settled in colonial Mozambique and migrated to Portugal after Mozambican independence in 1975, together with smaller groups originating in Goa, Daman and Diu. Since the 1990s, and increasingly from the 2010s, the Hindu population has also been shaped by newer South Asian migration, including Nepali migrant labour to Portugal.

== Historical Background ==
=== Portuguese India ===
Portugal's contact with Hindu communities in India began with the creation of the early modern, Estado da Índia. Vasco da Gama reached Calicut in 1498, and after Afonso de Albuquerque's conquest of Goa in 1510 the city became the main Portuguese base in Asia. Portuguese India later included Goa, Daman and Diu, territories that remained under Portuguese rule until their annexation by India in 1961.

Portuguese rule was closely tied to Catholic missionary policy. Colonial authorities sought to restrict public Hindu worship and encourage conversion to Catholicism. This involved the destruction or closure of temples, as well as restrictions on Hindu practices and celebration of Hindu festivals. Hindu communities resisted colonial restrictions on religious practice by moving murtis and temple institutions beyond Portuguese controlled territory.

== Migration ==
The modern Hindu community in Portugal took shape mainly during the late 1970s and early 1980s. Gujarati trading families, particularly of the Lohana and Vaniya communities with origins in Gujarat and the Portuguese enclave of Diu, had established themselves in Mozambique during the nineteenth century under colonial rule. After Mozambique’s independence in 1975 and amid the civil war that followed, a share of this community moved to Portugal, settling primarily in the Lisbon area. This migration forms the core of the present-day Hindu population. Later migration from Diu and Gujarat continued through family reunification and marriage.

== Demographics ==
The 2021 census recorded 19,471 Hindus among Portugal's residents aged 15 and over, which represents 0.22% of population. The 2021 census was first time Hinduism appeared as a separate category, earlier censuses had grouped it under 'other religions'. Majority of Hindu's recorded in the census lived in the Lisbon region. The census counted 11,085 Hindus in the Lisbon Metropolitan Area, representing 0.46% of its population aged 15 or over and approximately 57% of the national Hindu total. More recent Nepalese migration has expanded the community beyond Lisbon, particularly in agricultural areas of the Alentejo and Algarve.

== Community organisations and temples ==
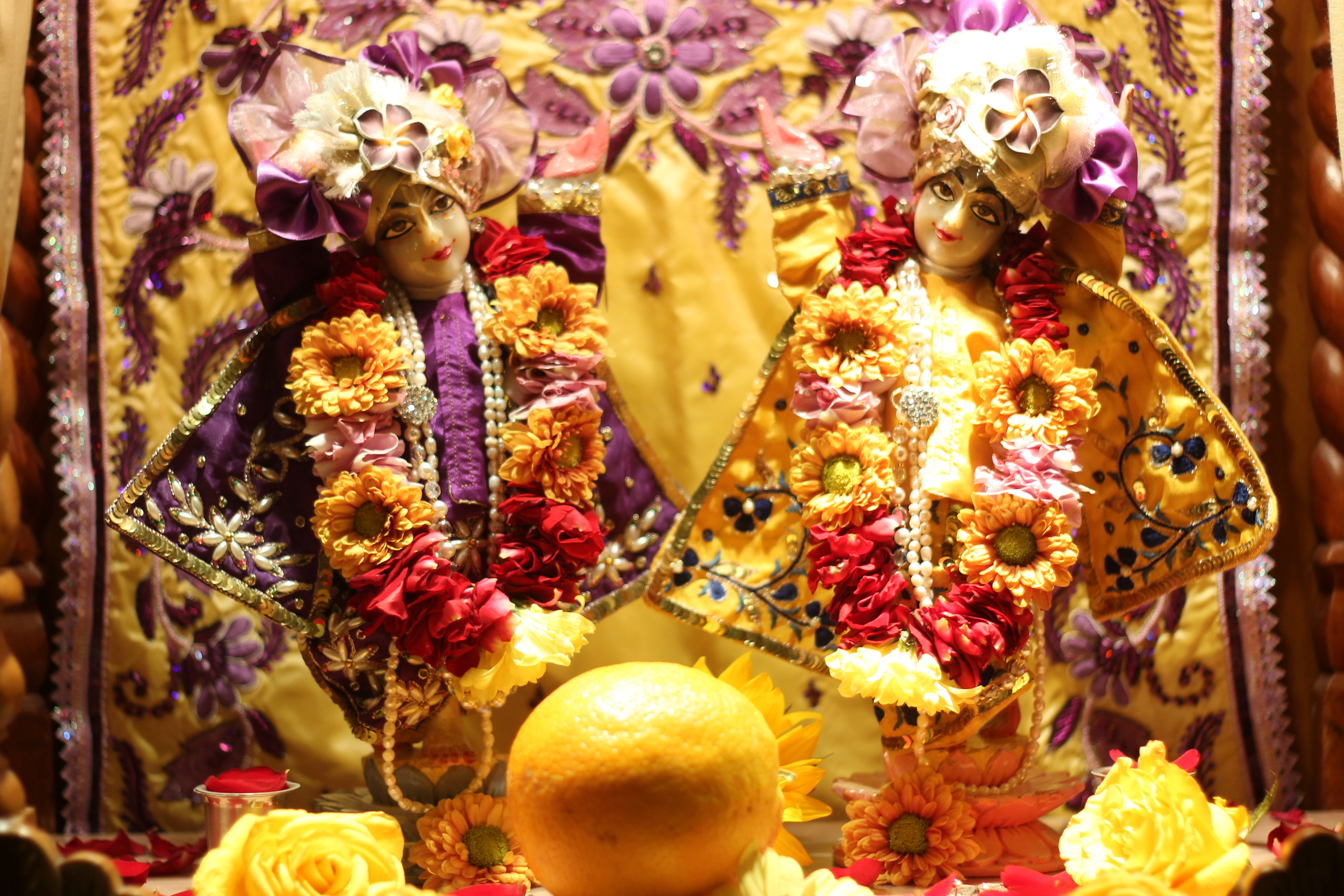
ISKCON Lisbon

One of the main Hindu organizations in Portugal is the 'Comunidade Hindu de Portugal' (Hindu Community of Portugal), formally established in 1982. It is based at the Radha Krishna Mandir in Lumiar, Lisbon, which opened in 1998 and serves Hindu families within the Lisbon metropolitan area. The complex also provides social and cultural services.

Other Hindu movements have also established centres in Lisbon. The International Society for Krishna Consciousness maintains a Lisbon centre, while the BAPS Swaminarayan Sanstha inaugurated a new mandir in the city in 2014.

== Religious and cultural life ==
Religious life takes place both at home and in temples. Household shrines are common, while festivals such as Navaratri and Holi bring the community together, most notably in the Lisbon metropolitan area. Gujarati devotional music has also been maintained in Portugal, including the performance of Kathiyawadi bhajan associated with the Saurashtra region of Gujarat.

Women play a prominent role in maintaining household and communal rituals, as well as passing religious knowledge to younger generations. In some settings they have assumed ritual responsibilities previously associated with male priests. Family and marriage networks also sustain links between the diaspora in Portugal, India, Mozambique and the United Kingdom.

== Legal Status ==
Article 41 of the Portuguese Constitution guarantees freedom of conscience, religion and worship. It also prohibits discrimination on religious grounds and provides for the independence of religious communities from the state. The Religious Freedom Commission (Comissão da Liberdade Religiosa), which was created as part of the Religious Freedom Act of 2001, is an independent consultative body that advises the government on matters relating to the application of the law on religious freedom. Its membership has included specialists in Hinduism. In 2025, Alpesh Kumar Ranchordas was reappointed for his knowledge of Hindu religion and experience in interfaith dialogue.

== See also ==
- Indians in Portugal
- Nepalis in Portugal
- Hinduism in Goa
- Portuguese India
- Hinduism in Europe
