= Best Cultural Institution Award =

Annual awards for Goa-based cultural institutions

- Awarded for: Exemplary achievement by an institution in art and culture
- Country: India
- Presented by: Government of Goa
- Reward: ₹3 lakh (US$3,200)
- First award: 2008
- Final award: 2022 (Note: Awards were not given for the year 2020–2021 due to the COVID-19 pandemic.)

Highlights
- Total awarded: 15
- First winner: Gomant Vidya Niketan, Margao
- Last winner: Pandurang Prasadik Natya Mandal, Sankhali
- Website: www.artandculture.goa.gov.in

The Best Cultural Institution Award, also known as the State Cultural Award for Institution, is an annual award conferred by the Department of Art and Culture of the Government of Goa. This award has been established with the purpose of acknowledging, promoting, and honoring the notable contributions made by cultural institutions in the sphere of art and culture.

By presenting this recognition, the Government of Goa seeks to provide a significant boost to cultural organizations in the region, thereby fostering an environment that nurtures and encourages emerging talents. In recognition of their eligibility, qualifying institutions receive a commemorative item as well as a financial reward amounting to ₹3 lakh (US$3,200)

== Aims ==
The primary objective of this award is to acknowledge, endorse, and value the institution recognized as the foremost Cultural Institution of Goa. By doing so, the aim is to provide impetus to cultural institutions in general, which will subsequently inspire other establishments within the state to actively promote and nurture cultural talents, thereby fostering an exceptional creative output.

Another essential goal is to cultivate a thriving cultural environment within the state. Additionally, this endeavor seeks to honor and commend the outstanding accomplishments of the esteemed institution deserving of such recognition.

== Eligibility ==
The eligibility criteria for the award require that institutions have completed a minimum of 15 years of operation, during which they must have made extraordinary contributions to the realm of Art and Culture. This recognition is reserved for institutions that have showcased exceptional achievements and have significantly influenced the artistic landscape.

Emphasis is placed on institutions engaged in Cultural Education, encompassing the provision of training in various artistic disciplines such as music, dance, drama, and fine arts. These institutions play a pivotal role in nurturing and honing the talents of aspiring artists, facilitating their artistic development.

Furthermore, cultural institutions that receive financial support from Central Government Corporations or Municipalities are also eligible to apply for the award. This provision ensures that institutions with diverse funding sources can be considered for recognition, facilitating a fair and inclusive selection process.

Once an institution has been bestowed with the award, it becomes ineligible for subsequent awards. This policy ensures a balanced and equitable distribution of recognition among different institutions over time, fostering a dynamic and evolving artistic landscape.

Moreover, it is essential for an institution to possess a managing body, with clearly defined powers and duties stipulated in its constitution. Additionally, the institution should relish a commendable reputation within the local community, serving as a testament to its unwavering dedication to promoting and supporting the arts.

== Procedure ==
Annually, the Department of Art and Culture issues a press release or advertisement with the purpose of inviting commendations for the award. This initiative seeks recommendations from esteemed institutions and accomplished individuals who have made significant contributions within the realm of Art & Culture. Notably, the committee responsible for overseeing this endeavor possesses the autonomy to independently acknowledge noteworthy accomplishments and put forth deserving institutions for consideration.

== Recipients ==
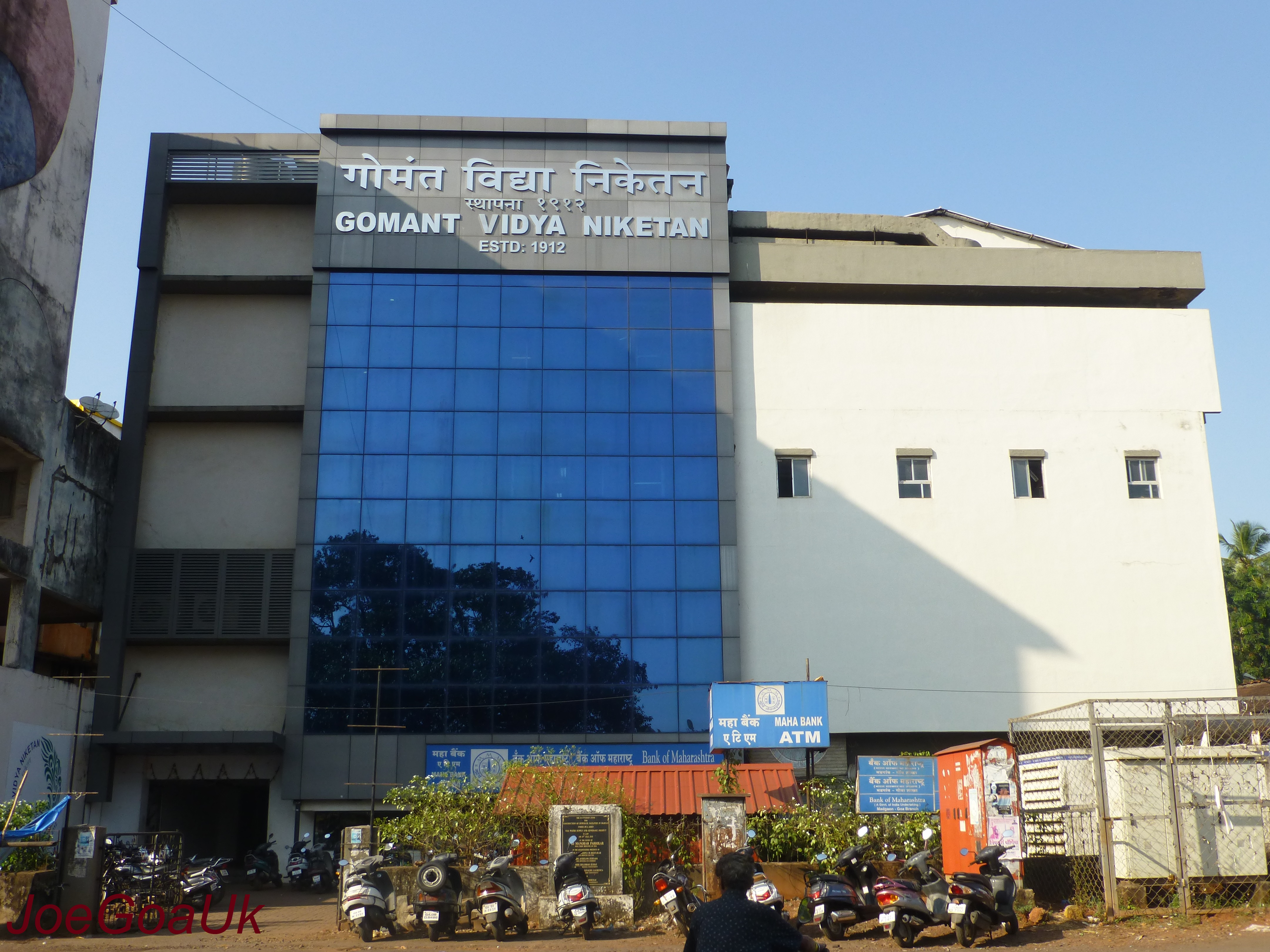
Gomant Vidya Niketan was the first cultural institution to receive the award.

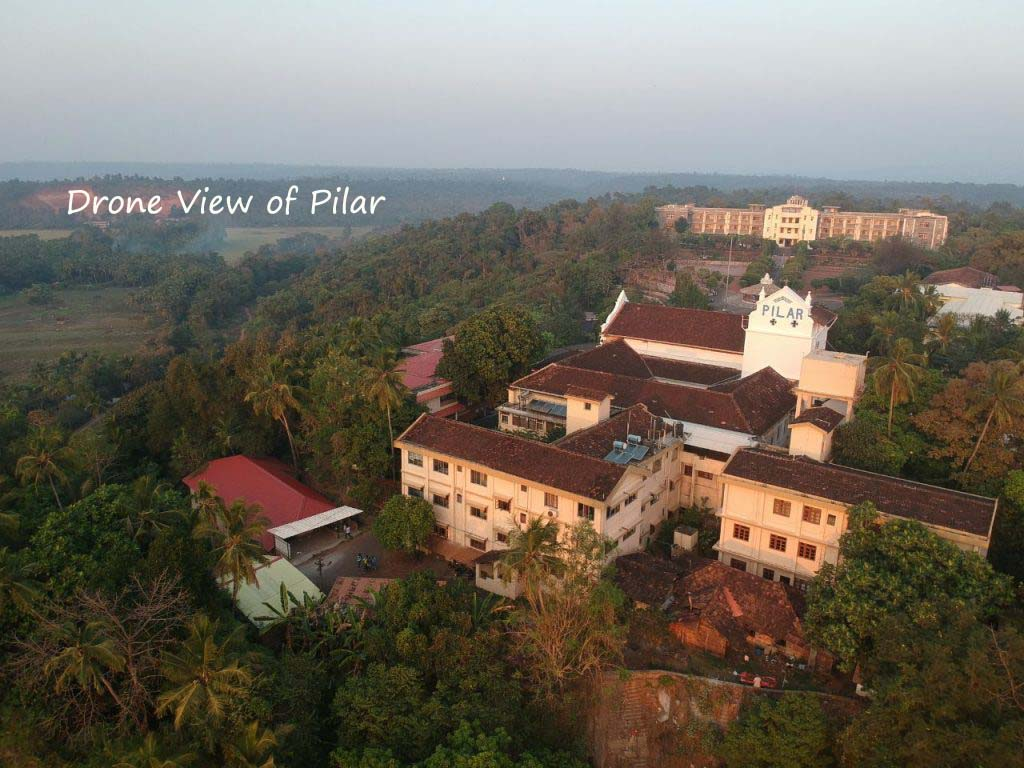
The Society of Pilar was the first and only Roman Catholic society to receive the award.

Year	Name	Ref
2008	Gomant Vidya Niketan, Margao	
2009	Konkani Bhasha Mandal, Margao	
2010	Society of Pilar	
2011	Xavier Centre of Historical Research	
2012	Hauns Sangeet Natya Mandal, Ponda	
2013	Naguesh Mahalaxmi Prasadik Natyasamaj, Bandora	
2014	Goa Cultural & Social Centre, Panaji	
2015	Rudreshwar, Panaji	
2016	Antruz Lalitak, Bandora	
2017	Dayanand Kala Kendra, Curchorem	
2017	Grupo Alegria Social & Cultural Association, Tiswadi	
2018 (Note: The award year differs from two sources; while the official website of the Government of Goa states that these two institutions received the award for the year 2018–2019, the official website of the Directorate of Art and Culture of the Government of Goa states that they were awarded for the year 2019–2020.)	Vardambika Kala Sangh, Curti	
2018	Shree Naguesh Maharudra Bhajani Mandal, Tiswadi	
2021	Mahashala Kala Sangam, Marcel	
2022	Pandurang Prasadik Natya Mandal, Sankhali	
