= Kashinath Damodar Naik =

Indian businessman and scholar (1895–1968)

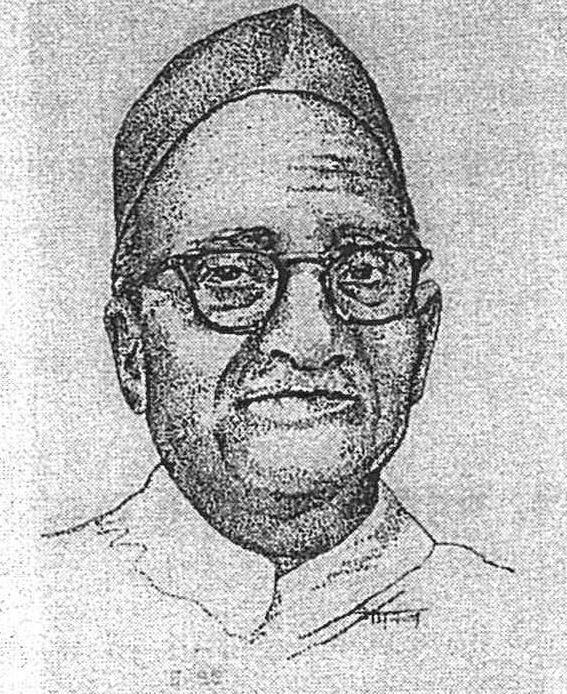
- Born: 26 May 1895; Margao, Portuguese Goa
- Died: 2 February 1968 (aged 72); Margao, Goa, India
- Occupations: Businessman, social worker, scholar
- Known for: Co-founder of Gomant Vidya Niketan

Kashinath Damodar Naik (26 May 1895 – 2 February 1968) was an Indian businessman, social worker, and scholar of prehistoric times from Margao, Goa. He was noted for his contributions to Goan social institutions, vernacular journalism, and his covert support for the Goan independence movement.

== Early life and education ==
Kashinath Damodar Naik was born on 26 May 1895 in Margao. He completed his primary education in Marathi, followed by Portuguese education up to the Segundo Grau (second grade). He also acquired a functional education in English.

== Business career ==
Naik entered the commercial sector in 1908. In 1920, he expanded his business to Bombay, where he established a commission agency firm under his own name. Later in 1939, he launched an independent business venture back in Margao with the cooperation of his brother, Srinivas.

== Social and cultural work ==
In 1912, Naik played a foundational and long-standing role in the establishment and subsequent operations of the Saraswat Brahmin Samaj in Margao, later known as the Gomant Vidya Niketan. He later founded another social institution named Samaj Seva Sangh, through which he operated the Mahila and Nutan Marathi Vidyalaya school, investing significant effort into its management.

Naik was also actively involved in journalism. When the Portuguese daily newspaper A Voz da India was on the verge of shutting down, he took charge of the publication and successfully ran it on cooperative principles despite facing opposition from the government. He also led the launch of the Marathi daily newspaper Gomantavani. In 1938, his prominent social standing led to his appointment as the president of the annual convention of The Goa Hindu Association in Bombay.

== Involvement in Goan independence movement ==
During the 1946 independence movement, Naik provided covert financial support and assisted in maintaining the livelihoods and households of several active independence activists. At the beginning of 1947, the government appointed him to a committee tasked with evaluating internal autonomy for Goa. However, once the authorities discovered his underlying connections with underground nationalist activists, Naik was forced to leave Goa and reside in Mumbai for a period of three to four years.

== Literary pursuits and research ==
Naik was a multilingual individual with a strong command over Marathi, English, Portuguese, Hindi, Bengali, and Gujarati. He was deeply interested in serious literature, ancient history books, and numismatics. Over his lifetime, he built a personal library consisting of approximately four thousand books across various languages, driven by a personal hobby of collecting the literary works of every Goan writer. He later donated this entire collection to the Gomant Vidya Niketan institution, along with a monetary donation of ₹10,000 to construct a dedicated hall for its safe preservation.

As a writer, his first historical research paper appeared around 1953 in the publication Bharatmintra. From 1954 to 1961, he contributed regular articles to the periodical Dudhsagar. His writings were additionally published in several other periodicals, including Deepavali, Archana, Mandavi, Gomantak, and Gomantavani. Compilations of his selected essays were published under the titles Gomantakachi Sanskrutik Ghadan and Gomantakache Antarang (1995).

== Death ==
Naik died on 2 February 1968 in his hometown of Margao.
