= Ravindra Bhavan, Margao =

Cultural center in Fatorda, Goa, India

- The official logo of RBM

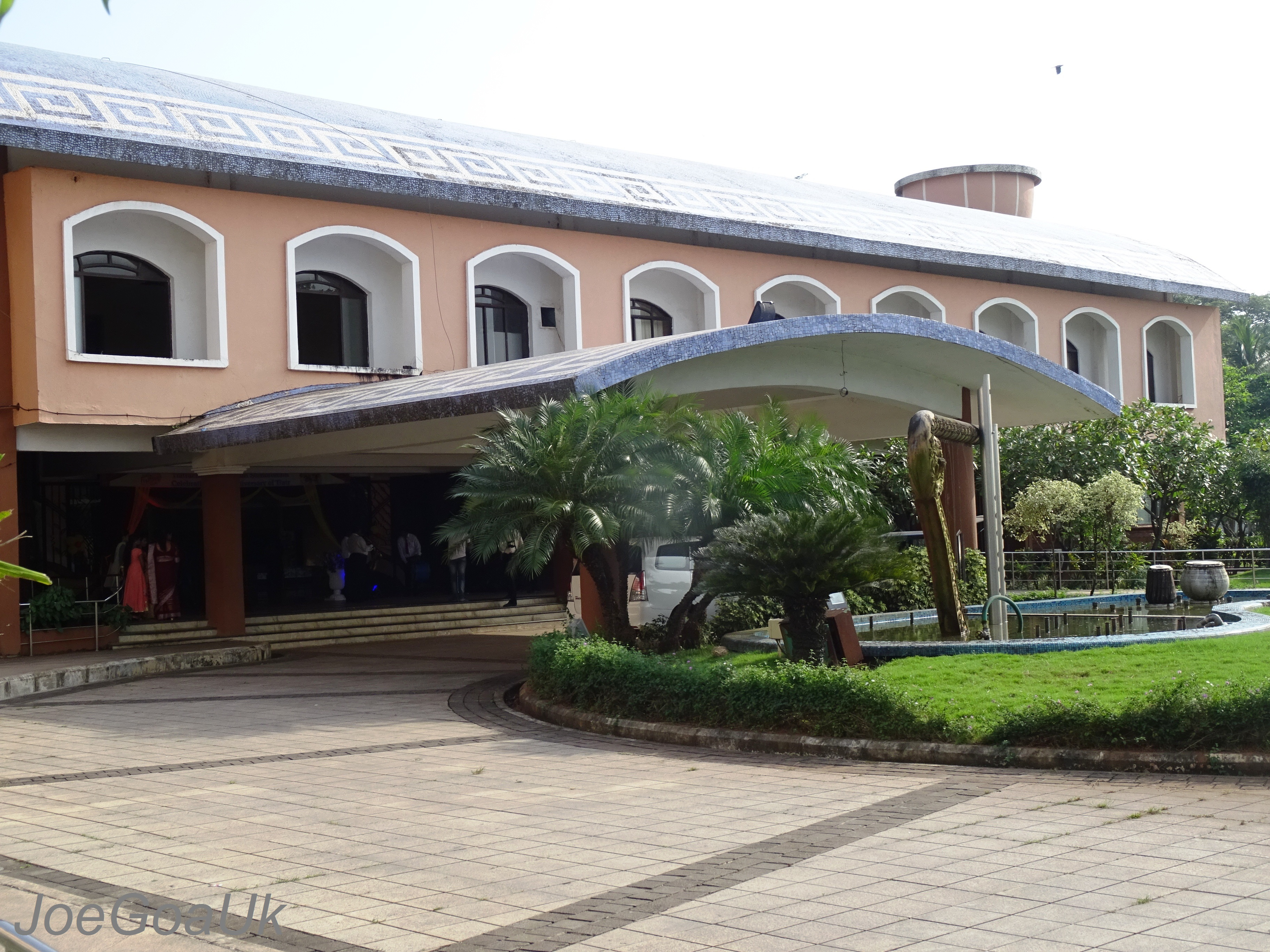
- The main entrance of RBM, 2016
- Interactive map of the Ravindra Bhavan, Margao area

General information
- Status: Completed
- Type: Government-owned cultural center
- Location: Fatorda, Goa, India
- Coordinates: 15°17′7.12″N 73°57′45.04″E
- Inaugurated: 20 July 2008; 17 years ago
- Cost: ₹22 crore (equivalent to ₹61 crore or US$6.4 million in 2023) (first phase)
- Client: Government of Goa
- Owner: Government of Goa

Dimensions
- Other dimensions: Area 30,539 square metres (328,720 sq ft)

Design and construction
- Main contractor: Public Works Department, Goa (renovation)

Other information
- Seating capacity: Pai Tiatrist Joao Agostinho Fernandes auditorium 1,069; Conference hall 275; Black Box 100; Open-air stage 3,000; Mini auditorium 150; Total 4,594
- Parking: Parking lane (150 cars and 400 bikes)

Website
- ravindrabhavanmargao.com

The Ravindra Bhavan, Margao (RBM) is a cultural center situated in Fatorda, Goa, India. It is administered by the Directorate of Art and Culture, which is part of the Government of Goa. The center was founded in July 2008 and was inaugurated under the governance of the Congress party in Goa at the time. It serves as a venue for a diverse range of cultural activities and events, featuring programs and performances in languages such as Konkani, English, Hindi, and Marathi. In addition to hosting local cultural programming, the center serves as a prominent venue that hosts a variety of important national and international events. It functions as a central nexus for a wide range of cultural events and activities within the Salcete taluka district of South Goa.

== History ==
Ravindra Bhavan, Margao (RBM) was inaugurated on 20 July 2008 during the tenure of the Congress party-led government of Goa. The Ravindra Bhavan was established under the auspices of the Directorate of Art and Culture, a department of the Government of Goa. It is officially recognized as an independent organization established according to the regulations set forth in the Societies Registration Act, 1860. The first phase of the center's construction was completed at an estimated cost of ₹22 crore (equivalent to ₹61 crore or US$6.4 million in 2023). Since its inauguration, the Ravindra Bhavan has functioned as a significant location for a wide spectrum of cultural activities and presentations, encompassing the traditional Goan performance style known as tiatrs. The center's auditorium has a seating capacity of 1,069 people.

In July 2009, shortly after the Ravindra Bhavan opened, there were reports of water seepage and damp issues, particularly around the building's joints and walls. The administrative body of the center confirmed that the structural concerns would be rectified during the implementation of the upcoming phase of construction and renovation projects facilitated by the state government. As a cultural hub in Margao, the Ravindra Bhavan plays an important role in promoting and preserving the arts, traditions, and heritage of Goa. The center's establishment by the state government aims to support and develop the state's cultural landscape.

The establishment of Ravindra Bhavan in Margao led to a recognition of the need for similar centers in other parts of Goa, prompting the government to approve the construction of analogous "Bhavans" (buildings) across various talukas (administrative divisions) of the state. Ravindra Bhavan, Margao is located on a spacious area and acts as a primary venue for a wide range of cultural events and initiatives in the Salcete taluka region. Within the center, there is a significant auditorium named in honor of João Agostinho Fernandes, a popular Goan actor, playwright, and influential figure in the Konkani tiatr tradition. Fernandes played a pivotal role in fostering the careers of several leading tiatrists in the area.

== Clubs ==
In November 2023, the cultural center established an affiliated club known as the Ravindra Bhavan Club. The club was founded under the oversight of the Ravindra Bhavan, Margao (RBM) committee, which is chaired by filmmaker Rajendra Talak. The Ravindra Bhavan Club was open to registered members of the organization. These members were given permission to utilize the club's facilities for the purpose of conducting group assemblies and participating in dialogues concerning cultural and societal themes. However, the club prohibited the hosting of business, political, or religious meetings and debates on its premises.

The Ravindra Bhavan Club maintained an open membership policy, welcoming individuals with experience or involvement in theater, music, dance, or cultural pursuits, as well as institutions operating in those domains. Membership required an annual fee of ₹100 (US$1.00) and obligated members to attend the organization's meetings. Members were able to make advance reservations to secure a table for a group of up to 8 individuals for a duration of up to 3 hours at these gatherings, depending on the availability of tables.

In June 2024, a new cinema-focused film club known as the Ravindra Bhavan Film Club was established. The club was founded by chairman Rajendra Talak. Membership in the Ravindra Bhavan Film Club was made available to interested parties upon payment of a ₹1,000 (US$10). As part of the club's programming, members of the club were guaranteed at least 20 film screenings each year. Furthermore, the club agreed to organize an annual international film festival and a separate festival specifically focusing on showcasing Indian films that had won National Film Awards.

At the film screening events hosted by the Ravindra Bhavan Film Club, the objective was to foster engaging discussions and interactions between the audience and film critics and celebrities. The club's intended to provide members with opportunities for engagement and discourse around the selected cinematic works. By offering a regular slate of screenings, festivals, and speaker events, the club sought to create a space for cinephiles to engage with diverse domestic and international films.

== Criticism ==
The establishment of the Ravindra Bhavan Film Club drew criticism from the South Goa MP, Viriato Fernandes. He expressed doubts regarding the choice to give precedence to the film club project instead of addressing what he perceived as the immediate necessity for music, dance, and theatre programs for the local populace. Fernandes raised issues regarding a perceived possible conflict of interest, indicating that Ravindra Bhavan, Margao, the organization managing the film club, might be favoring the concerns of private entities over the wider cultural requirements of the Goan community.

Fernandes recommended that Ravindra Bhavan, Margao to shift its focus towards enhancing arts and culture by providing educational programs and training opportunities specifically tailored for the youth and children within the local community. Fernandes' criticism of the film club initiative was supported by Moreno Rebello, the general secretary of the Goa unit of the Indian National Congress party. Rebello echoed Fernandes' view that the community's needs for music, dance, and theatre education should take precedence over the establishment of a new film club.

== See also ==
- Gomant Vidya Niketan
