= André Lacximicant =

Portuguese footballer (born 2001)

Personal information
- Full name: André Filipe Ferreira Lacximicant
- Date of birth: 19 May 2001 (age 25)
- Place of birth: Lisbon, Portugal
- Height: 1.88 m (6 ft 2 in)
- Position: Winger

Team information
- Current team: Estoril
- Number: 19

Youth career
- 2011–2012: Ponte Frielas
- 2012–2013: Loures
- 2013–2016: Sacavenense
- 2016–2018: Tondela
- 2018–2020: Académico Viseu

Senior career*
Years	Team	Apps	(Gls)
2020–2021	Leixões	3	(1)
2021–2024	Braga B	45	(14)
2024	→ Casa Pia (loan)	13	(1)
2024–	Estoril	49	(8)
- * Club domestic league appearances and goals as of 16:13, 26 May 2026 (UTC)

André Filipe Ferreira Lacximicant (born 19 May 2001) is a Portuguese professional footballer who plays as a winger for Primeira Liga club Estoril.

== Club career ==
=== Leixões ===
Born in Lisbon, Lacximicant played youth football for UD Ponte Frielas, GS Loures, SG Sacavenense, C.D. Tondela and Académico de Viseu FC, beginning his senior career with Leixões SC. Initially a part of the under-23 side, he made his debut in the Liga Portugal 2 with the first team on 9 May 2021, playing 57 minutes of the 2–0 home win against FC Porto B. He scored his first goal 13 days later, but in a 1–2 home loss to Académica de Coimbra.

=== Braga ===
On 6 July 2021, Lacximicant joined S.C. Braga for an undisclosed fee, being assigned to the reserves in the Liga 3. In September 2023, he surpassed Álvaro Djaló to become their all-time scorer in the competition at ten goals.

On 31 January 2024, Lacximicant extended his contract until June 2026, immediately being loaned to Primeira Liga club Casa Pia A.C. until the end of the season. He made his first league appearance on 5 February, as a late substitute in a 0–0 home draw with Boavista FC. His first goal came on 27 April, when he closed the 3–1 home victory over G.D. Chaves in injury time.

=== Estoril ===
Lacximicant signed a four-year deal with top-division G.D. Estoril Praia on 25 July 2024. On 4 April 2025, he scored a hat-trick in a 3–0 away victory over AVS Futebol SAD.

== Personal life ==
Lacximicant is of Indian descent on his father's side.
