= Mortó Dessai =

Portuguese physician of Goan descent (born 1922)

Mortó Sitarama Naique Pratap Rau Sar Dessai (born 4 January 1922) was a Portuguese medical analyst of Goan origin who worked in Goa and Portugal.

== Biography ==
Dessai was born in Goa, Portuguese India. He completed his pharmacy and medicine courses at the Escola Médico-Cirúrgica de Goa, respectively, in 1942 and 1948, and received four honorary awards in pharmacy and eight prizes, five honorifics and three institutional awards in medicine. He was an assistant of the third group of the Goa Medical School and in charge of the Hematology and Hemotherapy Services of Goa.

== Training ==
Dessai also trained at the K.E.M. Hospital of Bombay and Blood Transfusion Services of the Civil Hospitals of Lisbon, from 1953 to 1955.

Dessai also graduated in 1955 at the Faculty of Medicine of the University of Porto.

== Internships in Zürich and Basel ==
Dessai also did internships at laboratories in Zürich and Basel. Dessai was, in 1959, the Biochemist Analyst of the Blood Service of the Civil Hospitals of Lisbon.

== Papers published ==
He published the following papers:

- Filaríase em Goa, 1952
- Amibíase em Goa, 1954, em colecção
- Grupos Sanguíneos dos Goeses, 1954, em colecção
- Hemostase (alguns aspectos da sua Fisiopatologia), 1955, e
- Anemias Hemolíticas, 1957, em colecção
