= Gomant Vidya Niketan =

Private cultural center in Comba, Goa, India

- 100th anniversary logo

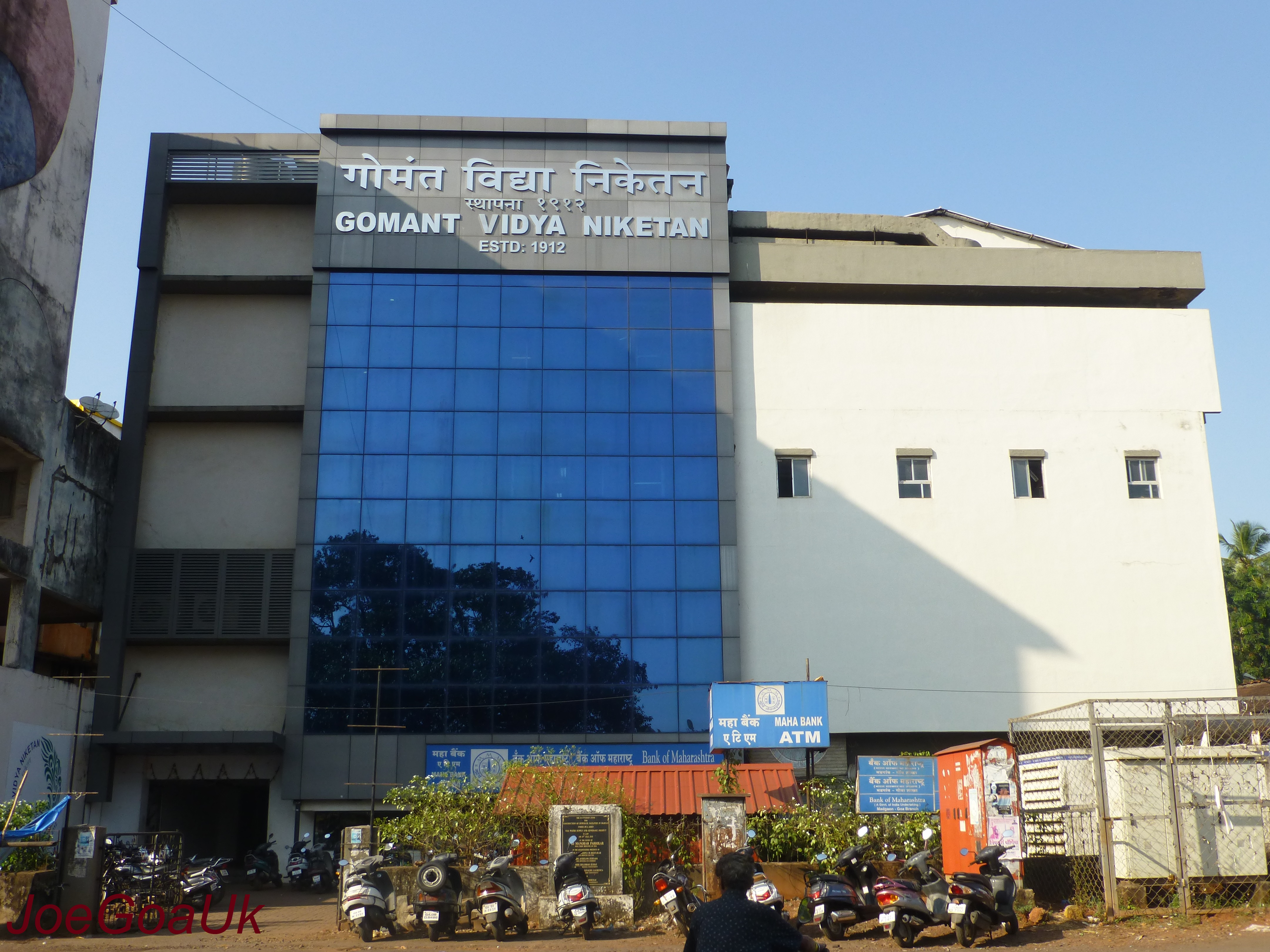
- Façade of Gomant Vidya Niketan, 2016
- Interactive map of the Gomant Vidya Niketan area
- Former names: Saraswat Brahman Samaj

General information
- Type: Private cultural center
- Location: Comba, Goa, India
- Coordinates: 15°16′29.59″N 73°57′25.77″E
- Inaugurated: 19 March 1912; 114 years ago

Design and construction
- Awards: Best Cultural Institution Award

The Gomant Vidya Niketan (GVN) is a private cultural center based in Comba, Goa, India. Established in 1912, it was originally founded as the Saraswat Brahman Samaj, a small library. Over time, the organization has expanded its scope and focus. Following the annexation of Goa, the organization was renamed to its current appellation in 1962. This change in name coincided with an elevation in the center's status, transforming it from a library into a broader cultural hub. The primary activities of the organization revolve around the promotion and hosting of cultural events and programs related to the Konkani and Marathi heritage. Gomant Vidya Niketan stands out as the longest-standing socio-cultural establishment in South Goa.

== History ==
In October 1910, the Portuguese monarchy that had ruled the territory of Portuguese Goa was overthrown, leading to the establishment of a republican government. This political transition marked the end of religious discrimination that had existed under the previous Portuguese regime.

Following these changes, on 19 March 1912, the Saraswat Brahman Samaj was set up by a group of nine prominent residents of the town of Margão, namely Yashwantrao Suryarao Sardesai, Bhikaji Purushottam Pai Bale, Kashinath Damodar Naik, Keshav Anant Nayak, Sadashiv Vasudev Kenkre, Govind Sakharam Panandikar, Ramchandra Venkatesh Nayak, Ramkrishna Narayan Bale, and Keshav Krishna Nayak. The founders were inspired by a shared vision to foster unity among diverse groups within Goan society, aiming to advance social, religious, and cultural initiatives. They thus set up a small library but gradually expanded its activities and programmes over time.

The Saraswat Brahmin society of Goa was responsible for the establishment of the library. The organization initiated a series of lectures featuring prominent speakers from the Bombay Presidency starting from its founding, the region that is now the state of Maharashtra. These lecture series are the Shrinivas Nayak Memorial Lecture Series, the Datta Govind Pai Raiturkar Memorial Lecture Series, and the Prof. Babuso Kamat Memorial Lecture Series.

It thus represented an effort by prominent Goan citizens to leverage the new freedoms that emerged following the end of Portuguese rule. The organization sought to promote unity and cultural advancement across Goan society in the wake of the political transition.

Gomant Vidya Niketan played a significant role in preserving and promoting the history and culture of the region. The institution offered an insight into the history of Goa and played an important role in identifying establishments that have contributed to the evolution of Goa. Over the years, Gomant Vidya Niketan has hosted a diverse range of lecture series and events, reflecting the interests and concerns of the local community. In the 1920s, a large number of academic talks centered on themes related to Hinduism, societal upheavals, and cultural intricacies. This shifted in the 1930s, with an emphasis on economic matters, such as employment and industrial development. The 1940s saw a significant focus on language issues, with discussions and discourses on the Marathi and Konkani languages, the latter being widely spoken in Goa. This linguistic focus continued to be a prominent feature of the institution's programming in the post-annexation era.

After the territories of Goa, Daman, and Diu were annexed in 1961, the institution underwent a renaming to Gomant Vidhya Niketan in 1962. In the latter half of the 20th century, the institution emerged as a center for cultural activities, hosting a wide range of talks, exhibitions, and classical music concerts, primarily focused on the Konkani and Marathi languages and traditions. The institution's facilities included a library on the ground floor and an amphitheater upstairs, which served as hubs for intellectual discourse and artistic expression. Gomant Vidya Niketan played a pivotal role in preserving and promoting the unique cultural identity of Goa and became a significant institution in the educational and cultural landscape of the region.

As of 1999, the library at GVN had around 29,000 books in Marathi, English, and Portuguese languages.

== Renovations ==
Gomant Vidya Niketan underwent renovations and expansions in the years leading up to its 100th anniversary in 2012. The renovations aimed to modernize and enhance the organization's facilities, such as the construction of a new main auditorium. Incorporated into the establishment's facilities are an air-conditioned auditorium designed to accommodate 500 individuals. Additionally, an amphitheater with 175 seats and a conference hall with 150 seats were added to the organization's infrastructure.

The renovations were partially funded through significant donations from prominent individuals associated with the GVN. Industrialist Auduth Timblo, who serves as the Chairman of the Fomento Group, donated ₹7.5 million (equivalent to ₹14 million or US$150,000 in 2023) specifically for the renovation of the 175-seat amphitheater. Timblo was recognized and honored for this contribution. Another major donor was Suresh Kare, the chairman of Indoco Remedies. Kare donated ₹10 million (equivalent to ₹22 million or US$230,000 in 2023) to GVN in December 2010. This donation was made in memory of Kare's father, Govind Ramnath Kare. As a result, the principal auditorium was officially christened the "Govind Kare auditorium" in recognition of his contribution. Suresh holds a position as a life member within the organization.

In November 2022, residents from the city of Margao, called for improvements to the area surrounding Gomant Vidya Niketan. The following year, in September 2023, some areas surrounding the building underwent beautification efforts, such as the entrance of Gomant Vidya Niketan. This project, initiated by local legislator Digambar Kamat and carried out by municipal councillor Shagun Naik, included the addition of a pedestrian walkway that had been designed to mirror the appearance of a musical piano. The entrance area also featured sculptures of a saxophone and guitar.

Following a week, the renovation efforts soon sparked controversy, regarding misuse of allotted funds. A local non-governmental organization, the Shadow Council for Margao (SCM), alleged that the work including musical instrument installations had cost the authorities ₹310,000 (US$3,200), SCM convenor Savio Coutinho claimed the total renovation expenses were estimated at only ₹181,000 (US$1,900). In response, Naik stated that the project was initiated following the required authorizations from GVN, and it was carried out by engineers employed by the Margao Municipal Corporation. The conflicting accounts of the renovation costs and process generated doubts within the community about transparency and accountability in municipal development initiatives.

== Awards ==
In 2008, Gomant Vidya Niketan was awarded the Best Cultural Institution, making it the inaugural recipient of this recognition.

== List of presidents ==
- Ashok Kare (2003 – 2012)
- Janardhan Verlekar (c. 2012 – c. 2025)
- Salil Kare (c. 2025 – present)

== See also ==
- Ravindra Bhavan, Margao
