= India–Portugal relations =

- Portugal: India

Diplomatic mission
- Embassy of Portugal, New Delhi: Embassy of India, Lisbon

Envoy
- Portuguese Ambassador to India Carlos Pereira Marques: Indian Ambassador to Portugal Shri Manish Chauhan

Relations between India and Portugal began amicably in 1947 when the former achieved independence. Relations went into decline after 1950 over Portugal's refusal to surrender its exclaves of Goa, Daman and Diu and Dadra and Nagar Haveli on India's west coast. By 1955, the two nations had cut off diplomatic relations, triggering a crisis that led to a war between two countries which resulted in the Indian annexation of Goa in 1961. Portugal refused to recognise Indian sovereignty over the annexed territories until 1974 when, following the Carnation Revolution, the new government in Lisbon recognised Indian sovereignty and restored diplomatic relations.

== Background ==
Prior to Indian independence Portugal's relations with the British Indian Empire were derived from those with the United Kingdom, set within the framework of the Anglo-Portuguese Treaty of 1373. This treaty, signed between King Edward III of England and Ferdinand I and Queen Eleanor of Portugal, established "perpetual friendships, unions [and] alliances" between the two seafaring nations and is the world's oldest active treaty. This led to amicable relations—especially with regard to trade and transport between British and Portuguese colonies in the India.

== Commencement of relations: 1947–1950 ==
Relations between Portugal and the Indian Union were quite cordial in 1947, particularly in light of Portuguese willingness to terminate the old Padroado treaty with the Holy See, which had traditionally given the Archbishop of Goa 'patriarchal' authority over other parts of India. On 12 August 1948, India and Portugal exchanged diplomatic missions.

== Goa dispute: 1950–61 ==
As of the creation of the Republic of India in January 1950, Portugal held a handful of territories on the Indian subcontinent—the districts of Goa, Daman and Diu and Dadra and Nagar Haveli—collectively known as the Estado da Índia. Goa, Daman and Diu covered an area of around 4,000 square kilometres (1,540 square miles) and had a population of 637,591. The Goan diaspora was estimated at 175,000 (about 100,000 within the Indian Union). Its religious distribution was 61% Hindu, 36.7% Christian (mostly Catholic), 2.2% Muslim. The economy was primarily based on agriculture, although the 1940s and 1950s saw a boom in mining—principally iron ore and some manganese. Portugal's steadfast refusal to cede these territories caused relations with India to decline. Armed conflict commenced in December 1961.

=== Opening of negotiations over Goa ===
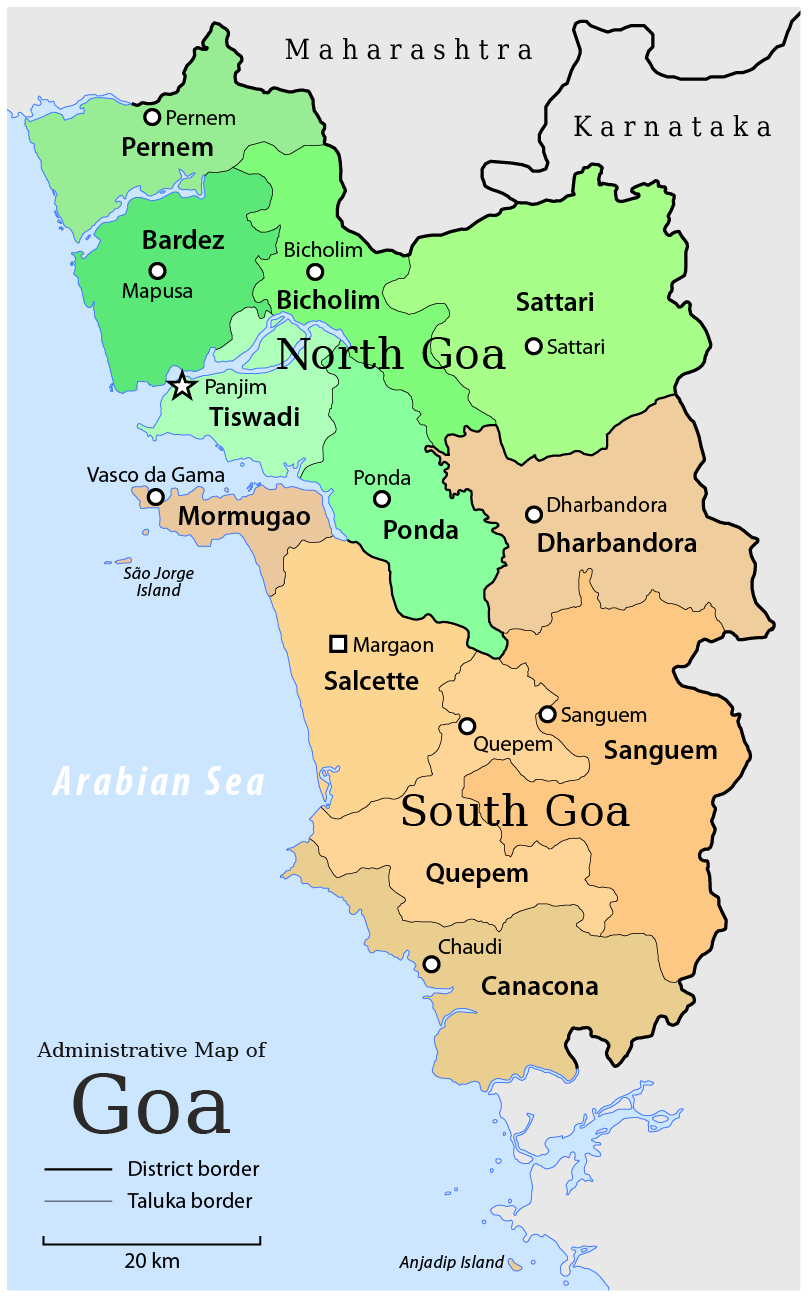
Goa, Western India

On 27 February 1950, the Government of India asked the Portuguese government to open negotiations about the future of these colonies. This followed Indian prime minister Jawaharlal Nehru's statement that "Goa is part of the Indian Union and it shall return." On 15 July 1950, the Portuguese government responded by declaring that the question presented "could not be discussed, much less accept the solution that was proposed."

Portugal asserted that its territory in India was not a colony but part of metropolitan Portugal and hence its transfer was non-negotiable; and that the India had no rights to this territory since the Republic of India did not exist when Goa came under Portuguese rule. The Portuguese constitution, which affirmed that the diplomatic and military defence of sovereignty was imperative, was amended in 1951 to explicitly designate colonies in India and Africa as 'Overseas Colonies' although Goa had been treated as one since 1518.

In January 1953, the Indian government sent an aide memoire to the Portuguese government pointing out that "political barriers artificially created by an accident of history for which no justification existed at the present time can no longer stem the rising tide of the national urge for unity." Further the government assured the Portuguese Government that it would "maintain cultural and other rights, including language, laws and customs of the inhabitants of these territories and make no changes in such and like matters except with their consent." When the Portuguese Government refused to respond to the aides memoirs, the Indian government, on 11 June 1953, withdrew its diplomatic mission from Lisbon.

In the course of 1954, the Portuguese appealed to Great Britain to bring pressure on India. Foreign secretary Alec Douglas-Home made it absolutely clear that the NATO alliance did not extend to Portuguese entanglements overseas, and that they should not expect anything more than a mediating role. He also warned that if Portugal invoked the old Anglo-Portuguese Alliance, Britain's response would be constrained, as she had no intention of engaging in hostilities with a member of the Commonwealth.

India attempted to use its position in the Non-Aligned Movement to gain support for its demands, while Portugal, as a founding member of NATO sought support amongst Western nations, as well as with India's rivals, Pakistan and China.

=== Estrangement ===
By 1954, the government of India instituted visa restrictions on travel from Goa to India which paralysed travel between Goa and other Portuguese exclaves in India. Meanwhile, the Indian union of dock workers had, in 1954, instituted a boycott on shipping to Portuguese India.

Between 22 July and 2 August 1954, armed activists—variously described by some as members of United Front of Goans under the leadership of Mr Francis Mascarenhas supported by regular troops and reserve police forces attacked and forced the surrender of Portuguese forces stationed in Dadra and Nagar Haveli. In anticipation of this operation, India sealed the border on 28 June 1954 and prevented the Portuguese from dispatching armed forces from coastal Damman to the inland enclaves.

On 30 November 1954, António Salazar addressed the Portuguese parliament, laying out the Portuguese position on Goa. Salazar dismissed India's claims to the territories as a 'fantasy', and lauded Goans for their steadfast patriotism in the face of 'Indian provocations'.

=== Satyagraha movement and breakdown of negotiations ===
A 1954 attempt by protesters to storm Tiracol Fort in Goa and hoist the Indian flag on it was suppressed by the Portuguese.

CBS cameraman Arthur Bonner and U.P. correspondent John Hlavacek rescue a satyagraha activist shot by Portuguese police on the Goa border on 15 August 1955.

On 15 August 1954, the Portuguese resisted an attempt by 49 non-violent Satyagrahi activists to march into Goa and hoist the Indian flag on Tiracol Fort resulting in deaths and injuries amongst the activists.

On 15 August 1955, 3–5,000 unarmed Indian activists attempted to enter Goa at six locations and were violently repulsed by Portuguese police officers, resulting in the deaths of between 21 and 30 people. In one incident at Banda, Portuguese and Goan policemen armed with rifles and sten guns and assisted by Portuguese and African soldiers from Mozambique opened fire on a group of 30 unarmed activists wounding one woman and two men in the presence of international journalists. The shooting stopped when CBS cameraman Arthur Bonner and United Press International correspondent John Hlavacek, intervened and rescued the injured activists.

The news of the shooting built public opinion in India against the Portuguese. Communist parties led protests marked by rioting in several locations as well as fomenting strikes in several factories demanding an armed response. Nehru described the Portuguese reaction as "brutal and uncivilized in the extreme." but added: "We will not be forced or hustled into what we consider wrong action. The Portuguese are deliberately trying to provoke us."

The press in India was sharply critical of Nehru's position on Goa. The Times of India attacked him for "vacillation, contradiction and appeasement", while the Bombay Free Press Journal accused him of "obliquely encouraging the satyagrahis with vague, irresponsible statements that satyagraha will solve the problems of Goan freedom." On 25 July 1955 Indian Government declared in Lok Sabha that Portuguese's were asked to close their offices in New Delhi.

Subsequent to the incidents on 15 August 1955, the Government of India imposed restrictions on people going to Goa as satyagrahis. On 1 September 1955, India shut its consulate in Goa.

In August 1955, Portuguese prime minister António de Oliveira Salazar stated that there would be no transfer to sovereignty "by peaceful means." On 17 September 1955, Nehru stated that reliance on peaceful methods to bring Goa into India "is not only a sound policy, but the only possible policy."

In 1956, Portuguese ambassador to France, Marcello Mathias, along with prime minister Salazar, argued in favour of a referendum in Goa to determine its future. This proposal was however rejected by the ministers for defence and foreign affairs. The demand for a referendum was again made by presidential candidate General Humberto Delgado in 1957.

In 1957, the Indian army deployed anti-aircraft missiles near Daman and Diu airfields and threatened to shoot down any aircraft that strayed into Indian airspace whilst taking off or landing at the newly built airports at these locations. On 3 April 1958, the Indian Government partially lifted the 1955 restrictions on Indian nationals and residents, permitting them to come to Goa, Daman and Diu, which they had been deprived of since the removal of the Indian Consulate in that city (Pangim), at the beginning of blockade and closure of the frontiers.

=== UN involvement in Goa crisis ===
On 14 December 1960, the United Nations General Assembly passed Resolution 1514 (XV) urging all countries to take steps to place their colonies and non-self-governing territories on the road to self-determination in accordance with Article 73 of the UN Charter. Portugal claimed this resolution did not apply to them, as her colonies were overseas provinces, constitutionally integral to the nation, and thus exempt. On 15 December 1960, the UNGA passed Resolution 1541 laying out 12 conditions by which the UNGA would determine the definition of a non-self-governing territory. This was immediately followed by Resolution 1542 declaring that nine Portuguese overseas provinces met these conditions and were to be considered "non-self-governing" territories for the purposes of Resolution 1514, even if the Portuguese constitution did not recognise them as such.

=== Indian support to partisan movements in Goa ===
In addition to non-violent protests, armed groups such as Azad Gomantak Dal (Free Goa Party) and the United Front of Goans conducted violent attacks aimed at weakening Portuguese rule in Goa. The Indian government supported the establishment of armed groups such as Azad Gomantak Dal, giving them full financial, logistic and armament support. The armed groups acted from bases situated in Indian territory and under cover of Indian police forces. The Indian government—through these armed groups – attempted to destroy economic targets, telegraph and telephone lines, road, water and rail transport, in order to impede economic activity and create conditions for a general uprising.

Commenting on the armed resistance, Portuguese army officer, Captain Carlos Azaredo stationed with the army in Goa states in Portuguese newspaper O Expresso: "To the contrary to what is being said, the most evolved guerrilla warfare which our Armed Forces encountered was in Goa. I know what I'm talking about, because I also fought in Angola and in Guiné. In 1961 alone, until December, around 80 policemen died. The major part of Azad Gomantak Dal were not Goans. Many had fought in the British Army under General Montgomery, against the Germans."

=== International efforts at reconciliation ===
Portugal's prime minister Salazar, alarmed by India's hints of armed action, first asked the United Kingdom to mediate, then protested through Brazil and eventually asked the United Nations Security Council to intervene. Meanwhile, on 6 December, Mexico offered the Indian government its influence in Latin America to bring pressure on the Portuguese to relieve tensions.

Meanwhile, Krishna Menon, India's defence minister and head of India's UN delegation, stated that India had not "abjured the use of force" in Goa, and went on to link Goa to Angola, condemning Portugal's colonisation policies in both cases. Indian forces were, at the time, serving in Congo as part of a UN operation and had been involved in the fighting.

American diplomatic initiatives to prevent armed conflict had to balance its relationship with India and its NATO alliance with Portugal, and to dispel the idea that such initiatives were being made under pressure from the Portuguese government, while avoiding NATO involvement. The US government stopped short of suggesting self-determination for the people of Goa, unready to apply that policy to all other Portuguese holdings worldwide, and would damage US–Portugal relations.

The American ambassador to India, John Kenneth Galbraith, repeatedly requested the Indian government to resolve the issue peacefully through mediation and consensus rather than armed conflict. Nehru postponed the invasion of Goa and expressed his willingness to negotiate on the condition that Portugal first announce its intentions to withdraw from Goa. This condition was rejected by the Portuguese as contrary to the spirit of a negotiation.

United States President John F. Kennedy, in a message to Nehru, argued that if India used force against Goa, this, along with its military presence in Congo, would make an otherwise Gandhian nation look belligerent.

On 8 December, C. S. Jha, India's delegate at the United Nations Security Council, expressed India's disregard for international pressure by stating: "(The invasion of Goa) is a question of getting rid of the last vestiges of colonialism in India. That is a matter of faith with us. Whatever anyone else may think, Charter or no Charter, Council or no Council, that is our basic faith which we cannot afford to give up at any cost."

On 14 December, Acting UN Secretary-General U Thant addressed identical letters to Nehru and Salazar. He urged them to "ensure that the situation does not deteriorate to the extent that it might constitute a threat to peace and security", and to enter into negotiations to solve the problem.

Eventually, on 10 December, nine days prior to the invasion, Nehru announced that "Continuance of Goa under Portuguese rule is an impossibility". The US response was to warn India that if and when India's armed action in Goa was brought to the UN Security Council, it could expect no support from the US delegation.

=== Attack on the Sabarmati ===
On 24 November 1961, the Sabarmati, a passenger boat passing between the Portuguese-held island of Angediva and the Indian port of Kochi, was fired upon by Portuguese ground troops resulting in injuries to the chief engineer of the boat and the death of a passenger. The action was precipitated by Portuguese fears that the boat carried a military landing team intent on storming the island. A Portuguese investigation into the matter revealed that the boat had also been fired upon seven days earlier, when it accidentally strayed into Goan waters. The incidents fostered widespread support in India for military action.

=== Indian annexation of Goa ===
Following the breakdown of diplomatic efforts, India conducted an armed invasion of Goa, Daman and Diu on 18 December 1961, supported by artillery, air and naval forces. The armed action, codenamed Operation Vijay by the Indian government, involved air, sea and land strikes for over 36 hours. A decisive victory for India, it drove the Portuguese to surrender.

== Aftermath ==
India's liberation of Goa was met with both international support and deploration. In the years following the liberation, Portugal refused to recognize India's sovereignty over Goa. Salazar died in 1970. In 1974 a democratic government took power in Portugal and recognized India's sovereignty in Goa. The two countries signed a treaty in New Delhi on 31 December 1974, re-establishing diplomatic relations. Embassies were reopened, the Indian Embassy in June 1975, and the Portuguese Embassy in July 1975. A bilateral Agreement on Trade, Economic, Industrial and Technical Cooperation was signed in 1977 and a Joint Committee established under this Agreement first met in November 1981.

=== Increasing diplomatic contacts ===
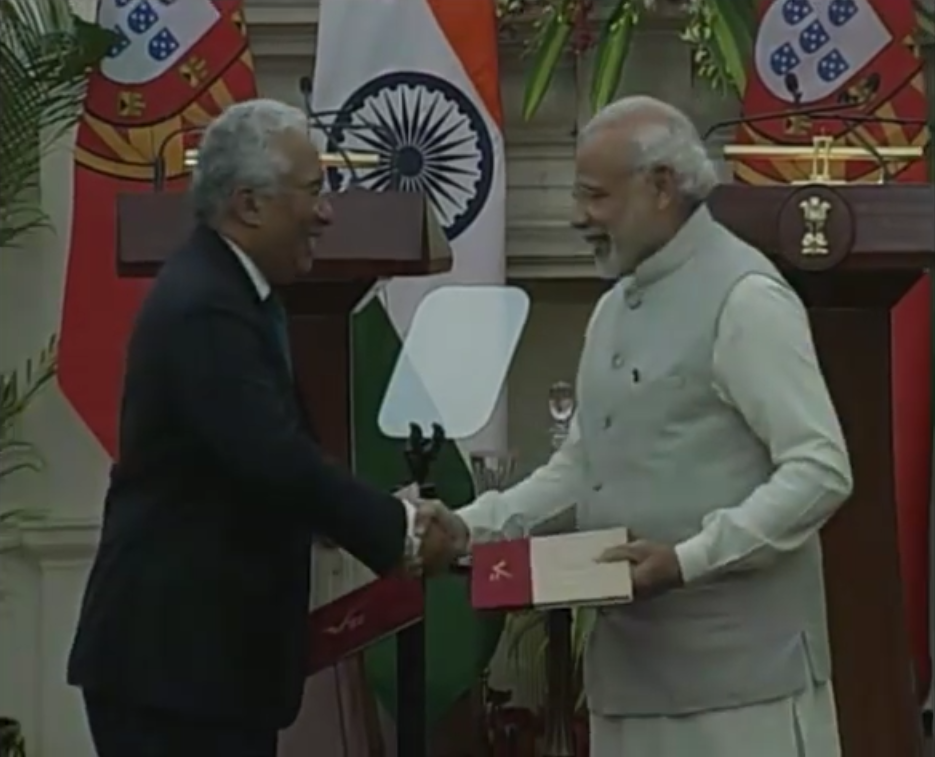
António Costa shakes hands with Narendra Modi in January 2017.

Signs of improved relations included two visits of Mario Soares: one as Prime Minister to attend the 1984 funeral of Indira Gandhi and again President/chief guest at the Republic Day event in New Delhi in 1992. President Venkataraman in 1990 and President KR Narayanan in 1998 made state visits in addition to Prime Minister Atal Bihari Vajpayee for the first India-Portugal Summit in June 2000. Aníbal Cavaco Silva paid a state visit in January 2007 followed by the visit of Prime Minister Jose Socrates in December 2007. Prime Minister António Costa paid yet another visit in January 2017.

Parliamentary exchanges commenced in 1999 with a visit of 9 ministers from Portugal led by Dr. Antonio de Almeida Santos, Speaker of the National Assembly of the Portuguese Republic from 15 to 22 December 1999. Dr. Joao Bosco Mota Amaral, Speaker of Parliament then led a 4-member delegation to the Golden Jubilee celebrations of India's Parliament on 21–25 January 2003. India dispatched a 12-member Parliamentary Delegation led by Manohar Joshi, Speaker of the Lok Sabha to Portugal from 25 to 28 May 2003 and a 16-member Parliamentary Goodwill Delegation led by Minister for Parliamentary Affairs & Information and Broadcasting, Priya Ranjan Dasmunshi visited on 6–7 November 2007.

Ministerial visits included Dr. Joao Cravinho, Secretary of State for Foreign Affairs on 21–22 November 2006, Anand Sharma, Indian Minister of State (MOS) for External Affairs to Lisbon from 10 to 12 June 2007, Luis Amado Foreign, Minister of Portugal to India from 8–11 July 2008 and Shashi Tharoor as MOS to the COD Ministerial in July 2009.

Portuguese President Marcelo Rebelo de Sousa made a four-day visit to India in February 2020, before 2020 the last visit by a Portuguese President to India was in 2007.

=== Treaties and agreements ===
In 1997 India and Portugal split the 1977 agreement into two separate segments— one providing economic and industrial cooperation (signed at Lisbon in April 2000) and the other providing cooperation in science and technology (signed in December 1998). Another Agreement providing for avoidance of double taxation was signed in September 1998. Both these agreements had since entered into force with the completion of ratification procedures.

A Cooperation Agreement was signed in January 1992, between the Federation of Indian Chambers of Commerce and Industry (FICCI) and the Portuguese Institute for Foreign Trade and Investment (ICEP). A Joint Business Council established under this agreement met in 1993, 1995 and 1997. A Cooperation Agreement between Confederation of Indian Industry (CII) and the Portuguese Association of Industries (AIP) was signed in July 1995. A Bilateral Investment Promotion and Protection Agreement (BIPPA) and an Agreement setting up a Joint Working Group on Information Technology were signed in June 2000.

The following agreements were signed in January 2007:

- Cultural Exchange Programme (2007–2010)
- Exchange Programme in the fields of Education, Language, Science, Technology and Higher Education (2007–2010)
- Overarching Agreement in the field of Education, Science, Culture, Sports, Youth and Mass Media (2007–2010)
- Extradition Treaty

=== Trade and economic relations ===
Indo-Portuguese bilateral trade grew from US$69 million in 1991 to US$289.52 million in 2005. India's exports constituted over 70% of the turnover.

Indian exports consisted principally of marine products, cotton and synthetic textiles, leather, footwear, hides and skins, staple fibres, coffee, tea & spices. In the twenty-first century exports diversified to include items such as carpets, gems and jewellery, silk and silk products, tobacco, electrical machinery & parts, iron & steel products, dyeing & tanning products, and organic chemicals. Automobile spares and components, computer software, bicycles, scooters and other two wheelers, and rice have also been exported. Portuguese exports to India were mostly machinery and heavy equipment (44% in 2006) with the remainder consisting mainly of cork and cork products, pulp and paper products, organic chemicals and plastics.

=== Return of gold ornaments by Banco Nacional Ultramarino ===
Following President Venkataraman's 1990 visit, an agreement was reached about the gold ornaments taken away from Goa by the Banco Nacional Ultramarino in 1961. These ornaments, deposited by the people of Goa in the Banco Nacional Ultramarino during Portuguese rule, were returned to the Indian government during the visit of Indian Minister of State for External Affairs, Eduardo Faleiro in July 1991.

== Resident diplomatic missions ==
- India has an embassy in Lisbon.
- Portugal has an embassy in New Delhi and a consulate-general in Panaji.

== See also ==
- Foreign relations of India
- Foreign relations of Portugal
- Luso-Indian
- Indians in Portugal
