= André Pereira dos Reis =

17th-century Portuguese military officer

André Pereira dos Reis was a Portuguese captain, pilot, and cartographer. A native of Goa, he was engaged in the wars against the Arabs, serving in the fleets of fortress of Portuguese India. In 1647, he was knighted. He was blamed for the loss of Muscat (1650).

== Sources ==
- Armando Cortesão; Avelino Teixeira da Mota. Portugaliae monumenta cartographica. 6 vols. (Lisbon: INCM, 1987), Volume V.
