= List of enclaves and exclaves =

In political geography, an enclave is a piece of land belonging to one territory that is totally surrounded by another territory. An exclave is a piece of land that is politically attached to a larger piece but not physically contiguous with it (connected to it) because they are completely separated by an unrelated territory or territories. Many entities are both enclaves and exclaves.

== Enclaves that are also exclaves ==
Each enclave listed in this section has an administrative level equivalent to that of the one other entity that entirely surrounds it. Each enclave is also a part of a main region; hence, it is an exclave of that region.

=== National level ===
Name	Area (km^{2})	Exclave of	Enclaved within	Coordinates	Notes
Apipé Islands (4)	~320	Argentina (Corrientes Province – Ituzaingó Department)	Paraguay (Misiones Department – Ayolas District)	27°31′S 56°51′W	Four adjacent islands (Isla Apipé Grande, Isla Apipé Chico, Isla Los Patos and Isla San Martín) with territorial water borders in the Río Paraná, 39 km east of Isla Entre Rios. Island areas are about 276, 23.8, 11.8 and 3.7 km^{2}, respectively.
Isla Entre Ríos	~36	Argentina (Corrientes Province – Berón de Astrada Department)	Paraguay (Ñeembucú Department – Cerrito District)	27°25′S 57°30′W	Uninhabited island with territorial water border in the Río Paraná, 39 km west of Isla Apipé.
Isla Martín García	1.84	Argentina (Buenos Aires Province – La Plata Partido)	Uruguay	34°10′47″S 58°15′0″W	Territorial water border on the Uruguay side of Río de la Plata. Designated as a nature reserve under the jurisdiction of Argentina in 1973.
Artsvashen	~40	Armenia (Gegharkunik Province)	Azerbaijan	40°38′N 45°30′E	Controlled by Azerbaijan since the First Nagorno-Karabakh War in 1992.
Torres Strait Islands (7)	~2,200 (including water area)	Australia (Queensland – Shire of Torres and Torres Strait Island Region)	Papua New Guinea	9°25′23″S 142°32′10″E	The islands of Anchor Cay, Aubusi Island, Black Rocks, Boigu Island (89.6 km^{2}), Bramble Cay (0.036 km^{2}), Dauan Island (4 km^{2}), Deliverance Island, East Cay, Kaumag Island, Kerr Islet, Moimi Island, Saibai Island (107.9 km^{2}), Turnagain Island (12 km^{2}) and Turu Cay, along with their territorial seas, form seven enclaves within the maritime area of Papua New Guinea under a treaty effective in 1985. The territorial sea of each island does not extend beyond three nautical miles. The mainland of Papua New Guinea is only 6 km from Boigu.
Jungholz	7.05	Austria (Tyrol state – Reutte District)	Germany (Bavaria state – Swabia administrative region)	47°34.3′N 10°27.3′E	Connected at a quadripoint at the summit of the mountain Sorgschrofen (1636 m); accessible only through Germany. Vinokurov (2007) states, "For all purposes, a connection in a single point does not mean anything. It is just like being completely separated. One cannot pass through a single point, nor is it possible to transport goods. It is not even possible to lay a telephone line."
Barkhudarli	~10	Azerbaijan (Qazakh District)	Armenia (Tavush Province)	40°59′36″N 45°13′31″E	Controlled by Armenia since the First Nagorno-Karabakh War in May 1992; west-southwest of the town of Qazax.
Yukhari Askipara	~28	Azerbaijan (Qazakh District)	Armenia (Tavush Province)	41°03′58″N 45°01′24″E	A destroyed village controlled by Armenia since the First Nagorno-Karabakh War in May 1992; west of the town of Qazax.
Karki / Tigranashen	8	Azerbaijan (Nakhchivan Autonomous Republic, Sadarak District)	Armenia (Ararat Province)	39°47.3′N 44°57′E	Controlled by Armenia since the First Nagorno-Karabakh War in May 1992; north of Azerbaijan's exclave of Nakhchivan.
Yaradullu (north and south)	0.12 and 0.06	Azerbaijan (Ağstafa District)	Armenia (Tavush Province)	41°00′51.8″N 45°26′12.2″E	Two farmland enclaves just across the border from the village of Yaradullu (55 m at the closest point). They are 750 m and 1500 m southwest of the municipality of Tatlı on the west bank of the Akhum River; approximately 300x400 m and 300x200 m. The surrounding Armenian territory has been occupied by Azerbaijan since the First Nagorno-Karabakh War in May 1992, so that these two small pockets of land are de facto no longer exclaves.
Dahagram-Angarpota	25.95	Bangladesh (Rangpur Division – Lalmonirhat district)	India (West Bengal state – Cooch Behar district)	26°18′N 88°57′E	Dahagram–Angarpota is a composite enclave of two adjoining chhits. It is separated from the contiguous area of Bangladesh at its closest point by 178 metres (584 ft). The enclave has an estimated population of 20,000. After the exchange of enclaves with India under the Land Boundary Agreement on 31 July 2015, Bangladesh retained it as an exclave. The Tin Bigha Corridor, a strip of Indian territory 85 metres (279 ft) wide running from the enclave to the Bangladesh mainland at its nearest approach, was leased to Bangladesh in perpetuity for access to the enclave.
Baarle-Hertog (22 parcels)	2.3448	Belgium (Antwerp province – Baarle-Hertog municipality)	Netherlands (North Brabant province – Baarle-Nassau municipality)	51°26′13″N 4°55′43″E (H1)	A group of 22 Belgian enclaves in the southern Netherlands. Enclaves H1 and H2 are connected at a single point.
Međurečje	3.9584	Bosnia and Herzegovina (Republika Srpska – Rudo municipality)	Serbia (Zlatibor District – Priboj municipality)	43°33′30″N 19°25′30″E	Homeland of Bosnia-Herzegovina is 1,130 metres (3,710 ft) to the north. Sastavci is the name of the neighbouring village in Serbia.
West Kowloon Port (aka. Mainland Port Area)	0.11	China (Guangdong province – Futian district)	Hong Kong (Yau Tsim Mong district)	22.304°N 114.165°E	China's immigration/customs border crossing that is located within Hong Kong; compartments of operating passenger trains on the rail link in Hong Kong are also considered part of Mainland Port Area. It is not contiguous with the rest of China. Effectively ceded to China in 2018 for a token HK$1,000 per year.
Quitasueño	3,577, including water area	Colombia (San Andrés y Providencia Department)	Nicaragua	14°24′1″N 81°7′47″W (QS32)	On 19 November 2012, the International Court of Justice upheld Colombia's claim to Quitasueño and Serrana, plus a 12-NM territorial zone, and re-defined Nicaragua's exclusive economic zone (EEZ), thus surrounding the island banks. It deemed one of Quitasueño's 54 features to be an island at high tide (elevation 70 cm, area 1 m^{2}) and created enclaves as an equitable solution. The area of Quitasueño, excluding the 12-mile zone, is ~290 km^{2}. The land area of Serrana is ~0.11 km^{2}, and the area of the bank, excluding the 12-mile zone, is ~322 km^{2}. Colombia decried the loss of maritime areas and creation of "'enclaves' around Quitasueño and Serrana that could restrict" access.
Serrana	~2,800, including water area	Colombia (San Andrés y Providencia Department)	Nicaragua	14°17′13″N 80°21′48″W (Southwest Cay)	
Brezovica Žumberačka (2)	0.0183+	Croatia (Karlovac County – Ozalj town)	Slovenia (Metlika municipality)	45°41′22″N 15°18′12″E	The first enclave contains four dwellings surrounded by agricultural land near the Slovenian village of Brezovica pri Metliki. It is about 437 m long and 60 m wide covering 1.83 ha. Confirmed by both Croatian and Slovenian cadaster maps, it lies about 100 metres away from the main border at the closest point. A second enclave lies within 300 metres of the first. It was created on 29 June 2017 when the Permanent Court of Arbitration decided that a disputed 2.4 ha parcel is part of Slovenia and that the border follows Slovenian cadastral limits, thus completing the encirclement of the second Croatian enclave. Croatia has stated that it will ignore the arbitration decision.
Ormidhia	1.694	Cyprus (Larnaca District)	Dhekelia Sovereign Base Area	34°59′33″N 33°46′49″E	Small exclave surrounded by Dhekelia, a British Overseas Territory in southeastern Cyprus. The degree of sovereignty and legitimacy of the Sovereign Base Areas is disputed by the Republic of Cyprus.
Xylotymbou	0.947	Cyprus (Larnaca District)	Dhekelia Sovereign Base Area	35°01′03″N 33°44′37″E	Small exclave surrounded by Dhekelia, a British Overseas Territory.
"Electricity Authority of Cyprus" Refugee Settlement	~0.28	Cyprus (Larnaca District)	Dhekelia Sovereign Base Area	34°59′04″N 33°44′37″E	North of Dhekelia Power Station from which it is separated by a British road; the closest point between the two territories is 21 metres.
Dhekelia Power Station	~0.161	Cyprus (Larnaca District)	Dhekelia Sovereign Base Area	34°58′49″N 33°44′45″E	Partially borders the coast but enclosed by UK land and waters disputed between Cyprus and the UK; the power station is owned by the Electricity Authority of Cyprus (EAC); no permanent population.
Münsterbildchen	1.826	Germany (North Rhine-Westphalia state – Aachen district – Roetgen municipality)	Belgium (Liège province – Raeren municipality)	50°39′36″N 6°11′24″E	West of Vennbahn trackbed; northernmost German enclave, mainly home to industrial and warehouse structures.
Roetgener Wald	9.98	Germany (North Rhine-Westphalia state – Aachen district – Roetgen and Simmerath municipalities)	Belgium (Liège province)	50°38′12″N 6°14′32″E	Western part of Lammersdorf, southern part of Roetgen, and intervening forest (Forst Rötgen); west and south of Vennbahn trackbed. From 1922 to 1958, the center portion (between Grenzweg and a boundary with three turning points west of the Schleebach stream) was Belgian territory. Until 1949, the east–west road that connected the two outer (German) portions was also German territory; therefore, the German land formed one oddly-shaped enclave (that also included the road to Konzen). In 1949, it was split into two enclaves when Germany ceded the roads to Belgium; in 1958, Belgium returned the east–west road and also ceded the centre section of the current enclave to Germany.
Rückschlag	0.016	Germany (North Rhine-Westphalia state – Aachen district – Monschau town)	Belgium (Liège province – Eupen municipality)	50°35′52″N 6°14′53″E	Part of city of Monschau, west of Vennbahn trackbed; smallest German exclave, consisting of a house and a garden.
Mützenich	12.117	Germany (North Rhine-Westphalia state – Aachen district – Monschau town)	Belgium (Liège province)	50°33′54″N 6°13′5″E	West of Belgium's Vennbahn trackbed.
Ruitzhof	0.937	Germany (North Rhine-Westphalia state – Aachen district – Monschau town)	Belgium (Liège province)	50°31′29″N 6°11′39″E	Part of city of Monschau, west of Vennbahn trackbed; southernmost Vennbahn enclave after 1949 (when Belgium annexed the Hemmeres enclave).
Büsingen am Hochrhein	7.62	Germany (Baden-Württemberg state – Konstanz district)	Switzerland	47°42′N 8°42′E	At its closest, less than 700 metres (2,300 ft) from Germany proper (to the east). Part of Swiss customs
Campione d'Italia	1.6	Italy (Lombardy region – Province of Como)	Switzerland (Canton Ticino – Lugano District)	45°58′10″N 8°58′25″E	Uses the Swiss franc. Former part of Swiss customs (until 2020). Separated by less than 1 km, at the shortest distance, from the rest of Italy by Lake Lugano and mountains, but the terrain requires a 14 km road journey to reach the nearest Italian town, Lanzo d'Intelvi.
Likoma Island	130.0 (incl a territorial water area)	Malawi (Northern Region – Likoma District)	Mozambique (Niassa Province – Lago District)	12°04′S 34°44′E	Lacustrine enclave, including smaller islets, with territorial water border in Lake Malawi (Lake Nyasa); only ~5 kilometres from the Mozambique shore; combined land area of Likoma Is. and the smaller Chizumulu Is. is 18 km^{2}.
Chizumulu Island (incl Lundu Is., Papia Is., Ngkyvo Is.)	101.4 (incl 2-NM territorial water area)	Malawi (Northern Region – Likoma District)	Mozambique (Niassa Province – Lago District)	12°01′0″S 34°37′14″E	Lacustrine enclave with territorial water border in Lake Malawi (Lake Nyasa); Malawian mainland is 46 km away.
Baarle-Nassau (8 parcels)	0.150684	Netherlands (North Brabant province – Baarle-Nassau municipality)	Belgium (Antwerp province – Baarle-Hertog municipality)	51°24′43″N 4°52′16″E (N8)	Seven of the eight Dutch enclaves are counter-enclaves inside two Belgian enclaves (H1 and H8); one is in the main body of Belgium (N8).
Laguna Los Portillos (and beach)	~0.46	Nicaragua (Río San Juan Department)	Costa Rica (Limón Province)	10°55′55.1″N 83°40′12.4″W	On 2 Feb 2018, the ICJ rendered a decision in a border dispute between Nicaragua and Costa Rica regarding Isla Portillos. Nicaragua was left with just the Laguna Los Portillos and its short strip of beach. The court also decided that the sea just outside of the lagoon would be Costa Rican waters. The ICJ concluded that the whole beach is Costa Rican except for the part directly between the lagoon and the Caribbean Sea – now a tiny enclave of Nicaraguan territory separated from the rest of the country.
Madha	~75	Oman (Musandam Governorate)	United Arab Emirates	25°17′N 56°17′E	Halfway between the Omani fragment on the Musandam Peninsula and the rest of Oman; surrounds the UAE counter-enclave of Nahwa.
San'kovo-Medvezh'e	4.54	Russia (Bryansk Oblast – Zlynkovsky District)	Belarus (Gomel Region – Dobrush Raion)	52°28′48″N 31°33′51″E	Contains two small villages that have been depopulated since the 1986 Chernobyl disaster in Ukraine.
Llívia	12.84	Spain (Catalonia autonomous community – Province of Girona/Cerdanya comarca)	France (Occitania region – Pyrénées-Orientales department)	42°28′N 1°59′E	To the east of Andorra, separated from the rest of Spain by a corridor about 2 km wide containing the French communes of Ur and Bourg-Madame.
Vorukh	~96.7	Tajikistan (Sughd Province – Isfara District)	Kyrgyzstan (Batken Province – Batken District)	39°51′04″N 70°38′00″E	South of the mountain Ak-Tash; population is 95% Tajik and the rest Kyrgyz.
"Lolazor"	~0.88	Tajikistan (Sughd Province – Isfara District)	Kyrgyzstan (Batken Province – Leilek District)	40°04′05″N 69°32′41″E	Near the railway station of Stantsiya Kayragach, next to the Kyrgyz–Tajik border; also referred to as "Western Qal'acha" due to proximity to the Tajik town of Qal'acha; apparently there is no named settlement.
Sarvan (also Sarvaksoi, Sarvaki-bolo)	8.4	Tajikistan (Sughd Region – Asht District)	Uzbekistan (Namangan Region – Pop district)	40°58′00″N 70°36′56″E	Long, narrow territory located in the Fergana and Isfara valleys region where Kyrgyzstan, Tajikistan and Uzbekistan meet.
Nahwa	~5.2	United Arab Emirates (Sharjah emirate)	Oman (Musandam Governorate)	25°16′N 56°16′E	A counter-enclave surrounded by Madha, reported to consist of around forty houses.
Filomena Islands (5 islands)	~23	Uruguay (Río Negro Department)	Argentina (Entre Ríos Province – Gualeguaychú and Uruguay departments)	32°59′S 58°6′W	Five adjacent islands (Isla Filomena Grande, Isla Filomena Chica, Isla Palma Chica, Isla Bassi, Isla Tres Cruces) with territorial water borders in the Uruguay River. Uninhabited islands that form part of the Esteros de Farrapos National Park.
Sokh	~234	Uzbekistan (Fergana Region – Sokh district)	Kyrgyzstan (Batken Region)	40°02′39″N 71°05′39″E	Large enclave with 99% Tajik population, the rest Kyrgyz and almost no ethnic Uzbeks.
Shakhimardan	~38.2	Uzbekistan (Fergana Region – Fergana district)	Kyrgyzstan (Batken Region – Kadamjay District)	39°58′59″N 71°48′18″E	Located in a narrow valley in the Alay Mountains where the rivers Ok-su and Kok-su meet to form the Shakhimardan-sai.
High Seas	~180,000	International waters	Japan	26°19′N 135°52′E	Surrounded by Japan's EEZ; it lies between the territorial zones of Honshu, Shikoku, the Bonin Islands, Okino-tori-shima and Okinawa Island
High Seas	~1,300	International waters	New Zealand	44°19′S 178°12′E	Surrounded by New Zealand's EEZ; it lies between the territorial zones of the Chatham Islands, North Island and the Bounty Islands
High Seas	~14,000	International waters	New Zealand	49°32′S 173°6′E	Surrounded by New Zealand's EEZ; it lies between the territorial zones of Campbell Island, South Island and the Antipodes Islands
High Seas	~3,700	International waters	French Polynesia	24.2°S 143.3°W	Surrounded by France's EEZ; it lies between the territorial zones of the Bass Islands, Raivavae, Nukutepipi, and Tematagi
Peanut Hole, High Seas	~46,000	International waters	Russia	53.3°N 149.6°E	Surrounded by Russia's EEZ in the Sea of Okhotsk, lying between the territorial zones of the Kamchatka Peninsula, Kuril Islands and Sakhalin Island. In March 2014, the area became a part of Russia's continental shelf. (Note: EEZs are not areas of sovereignty, but rather of sovereign rights and functional jurisdiction.)

=== First-order subnational level ===
Name	Area (km^{2})	Parent Country	Exclave of	Enclaved within	Coordinates	Notes
Qobu	~87	Azerbaijan	Absheron Rayon	Baku	40°24′N 49°42′E	Map showing Absheron rayon and Qobu; another showing Çeyildağ also
(south of Şərədil)	~9.7	Azerbaijan	Agsu District	Shamakhi District	40°35.8′N 48°29′E	
Çeyildağ	~21	Azerbaijan	Baku	Absheron Rayon	40°16′57″N 49°16′45″E	Çeyildağ at GEOnet Names Server
• Divanalılar and • Yuxarı Veysəlli	~1.3 and ~4.3	Azerbaijan	Füzuli Rayon	Xocavənd Rayon	39°41′32.03″N 47°2′11.83″E, 39°44′24.6″N 47°5′22.6″E	(Yuxarı Veysəlli at GEOnet Names Server)
Yuxarı Məzrə	~3.1	Azerbaijan	Jabrayil District	Khojavend District	39°27.5′N 46°57.4′E	
• Yeni Qaralar and • (near Muğanlı)	~0.25 and ~1.7	Azerbaijan	Khojaly District	Aghdam District	40°2′9″N 46°45′37″E, 39°55.9′N 46°57.5′E	
Ağbaş	~17	Azerbaijan	Shabran District	Siyazan District	41°6.8′N 49°5.7′E	
de jure • (includes Aşağı Quşçular, Yuxarı Quşçular, Malıbəyli) and • (southeast of Khojaly)	~9.3 and ~3.6	Azerbaijan	Şuşa Rayon	Xocalı Rayon	39°49′52.7″N 46°48′7.2″E, 39°52.5′N 46°47.9′E	Located near Xankəndi (Stepanakert), which includes parts of Şuşa and Xocalı Rayons. (Aşağı Quşçular at GEOnet Names Server, Yuxarı Quşçular at GEOnet Names Server, Malıbəyli at GEOnet Names Server)
• (northeast of Deşdahat, north of Başarat)	~5.3	Azerbaijan	Xocavənd Rayon	Qubadlı Rayon	39°31′40″N 46°43′54″E	Map showing exclave.
• (main part of the city) • Minsk National Airport • Sokol	409.5	Belarus	Minsk	Minsk Region (Minsk and Smalyavichy Raions)	53°54′N 27°34′E, 53°53.5′N 28°2.8′E, 53°52.6′N 27°53.9′E	
• (1 parcel)	~0.11	Belarus	Minsk Region (Minsk Raion)	Minsk (Maskowski District)	53°50′24″N 27°28′17″E	
(south of Arjo village)	~17	Ethiopia	Benishangul-Gumuz Region (Kamashi Zone – Belo Jegonfoy)	Oromia Region	8°58.6′N 36°12.8′E	
(northeast of Uke) (2 parcels)		Ethiopia	Benishangul-Gumuz Region (Kamashi Zone – Belo Jegonfoy)	Oromia Region (East Welega Zone – Guto Gida district)	9°23.2′N 36°33.5′E, 9°24.2′N 36°36.2′E	
• (includes Gardères, Luquet) and • (includes Séron, Escaunets, Villenave-près-Béarn)	42.02	France	Occitania (Hautes-Pyrénées – Arrondissement of Tarbes – Canton of Ossun and Canton of Vic-en-Bigorre)	Nouvelle-Aquitaine (Pyrénées-Atlantiques – Arrondissement of Pau)	43°16′N 0°7′W, 43°20′N 0°5′W	Séron is less than 300 metres from the neighbouring enclave to its south that includes Gardères and Luquet; they, along with Séron, are part of Canton d'Ossun. Escaunets and Villenave-près-Béarn are in the same enclave with Séron, but unlike Séron, they are part of Canton de Vic-en-Bigorre.
Canton of Valréas	124.91	France	Provence-Alpes-Côte d'Azur (Vaucluse – Arrondissement of Avignon)	Auvergne-Rhône-Alpes (Drôme – Arrondissement of Nyons)	44°21′N 4°58′E	Known as the Enclave des Papes, it was part of the possessions of the Pope in France near Avignon; it was attached to Vaucluse when annexed after the départements were created (see Comtat Venaissin).
(2 parcels)	~0.043	Germany	Baden-Württemberg (Karlsruhe — Rhein-Neckar-Kreis — Laudenbach)	Hesse (Darmstadt — Bergstraße — Heppenheim)	49°37′08.8″N 8°40′58.3″E; 49°36′31.9″N 8°40′44.5″E	One of these is a counter enclave.
• Hansestadt Bremen (south) and • Hansestadt Bremen (north)	408	Germany	Freie Hansestadt Bremen	Lower Saxony	53°7′N 8°45′E 53°34.5′N 8°34′E	Bremerhaven and Überseehafengebiet comprise Bremen's northern part, which is 60 km downstream of Bremen's larger southern part on the River Weser. Both parts of Hansestadt Bremen are enclaves within Lower Saxony, as well as exclaves of each other.
Fehrmoor (part)	~0.57	Germany	Freie Hansestadt Bremen (Bremerhaven Stadt – Nord Stadtbezirk – Leherheide Stadtteil – Fehrmoor Ortsteil)	Lower Saxony (Cuxhaven)	53°36.4′N 8°39.1′E	Fehrmoor is a part of Leherheide, which is a sub-division of Bremerhaven. Part of Fehrmoor is separated by a narrow strip of Lower Saxony from the rest of Bremerhaven, making it an exclave of the city and of the state.
Ober-Laudenbach (part)	~0.58	Germany	Hesse (Darmstadt — Bergstraße — Heppenheim)	Baden-Württemberg (Karlsruhe — Rhein-Neckar-Kreis — Laudenbach)	49°37′02.3″N 8°40′39.6″E	Contains a counter enclave.
Choto Pokalagi	0.549	India	Assam (Dhubri district)	West Bengal (Cooch Behar district)	26°18.5′N 89°44.1′E	National level enclaves prior to the incorporation of Cooch Behar into India in 1949
Gobrarkuthi	0.149	India	Assam (Dhubri district)	West Bengal (Cooch Behar district)	26°14.5′N 89°42.5′E	National level enclaves prior to the incorporation of Cooch Behar into India in 1949
Ramrayerkuthi	0.084	India	Assam (Dhubri district)	West Bengal (Cooch Behar district)	26°9.7′N 89°42.4′E	National level enclaves prior to the incorporation of Cooch Behar into India in 1949
Dadra	~26	India	Dadra and Nagar Haveli and Daman and Diu (Dadra and Nagar Haveli district)	Gujarat (Valsad district)	20°19′N 72°58′E	Dadra was part of the former Portuguese India.
Maghval		India	Gujarat (Valsad district — Kaparada Taluka)	Dadra and Nagar Haveli and Daman and Diu (Dadra and Nagar Haveli district – Nagar Haveli taluka)	20°13′N 73°2′E	Formerly "Bombay Enclave," Maghval was a British counter-enclave within the Portuguese enclave within British India until independence.
Yanam district	20	India	Puducherry	Andhra Pradesh (East Godavari district)	16°43′N 82°16′E	The four districts of Puducherry (Pondicherry, Mahe, Yanam and Karaikal) constituted a French colony until 1954.
• Cherukallayi and • (includes Palloor, Chalakkara, Pandakkal)		India	Puducherry (Mahe district)	Kerala (Kannur district)	11°42′44″N 75°32′1″E, 11°44′N 75°32.5′E	Mahe district consists of these two true enclaves and Mahé municipality.
• Bahour PS-Karaiyambuthur OP (3 enclaves), • Dhanvantry Nagar PS-Alankuppam OP, • Thirubuvanai PS/Thirukkanur PS (part), • Kattery Kuppam PS/Thirukkanur PS (part), • Nettapakkam PS (west), • Mangalam PS (part), • Thirukkanur PS (part)		India	Puducherry (Pondicherry district)	Tamil Nadu (Cuddalore and Viluppuram districts)	11°57′N 79°38′E (the largest part)	These 9 parcels along with three coastal pene-exclaves comprise all of Pondicherry district.
Kilinjikuppam and Singirikudi (part)	~7.4	India	Tamil Nadu (Cuddalore district — Cuddalore taluk)	Puducherry (Pondicherry district)	11°53.3′N 79°47.3′E	This enclave is surrounded by one of the three coastal pene-exclaves in Pondicherry district.
Bara Lowkuthi	5.47	India	West Bengal (Cooch Behar district)	Assam (Kokrajhar district)	26°20.5′N 89°48′E	A national level enclave prior to the incorporation of Cooch Behar into India in 1949
Ca' Raffaello (includes Santa Sofia Marecchia and Ortale)	~15	Italy	Tuscany (Province of Arezzo – Badia Tedalda)	Emilia-Romagna (Province of Rimini)	43°47.4′N 12°12.2′E	One enclave
Monte Ruperto	2.7	Italy	Umbria (Province of Perugia – Città di Castello)	Marche (Province of Pesaro and Urbino)	43°36.1′N 12°25.4′E	This enclave consists of hills, cropland and few structures.
Lama Superiore and Valle Inferiore	~0.29 and ~0.11	Italy	Emilia-Romagna (Province of Piacenza – Corte Brugnatella)	Lombardy (Province of Pavia)	44.70344°N 9.29495°E, 44.69374°N 9.30190°E	Two tiny rural enclaves very close to each other. There is just one house in Valle Inferiore and none in Lama.
San Pellegrino in Alpe		Italy	Emilia-Romagna (Province of Modena – Frassinoro)	Tuscany (Province of Lucca – Castiglione di Garfagnana)	44.18990°N 10.48074°E	Enclave including part of the village of San Pellegrino in Alpe. map
San Pio (1 parcel)	~0.18	Italy	Lombardy (Province of Pavia – Pieve del Cairo)	Piedmont (Province of Alessandria)	45.018488°N 8.813027°E	Small plots of cropland
Iesce		Italy	Basilicata (Province of Matera – Matera)	Apulia (Province of Bari – Altamura)	40.7556°N 16.6407°E	Small plots of cropland
(1 parcel)		Japan	Saitama Prefecture (Fukaya)	Gunma Prefecture (Isesaki)	36.2444°N 139.2628°E	
(2 parcels)		Japan	Tokyo (Machida)	Kanagawa Prefecture (Sagamihara)	35.5989°N 139.3565°E; 35.5984°N 139.3637°E	
Nishiōizumimachi	0.002	Japan	Tokyo (Nerima Ward)	Saitama Prefecture (Niiza)	35.7634°N 139.5669°E	The enclave is a small street.
Wes		Liechtenstein	Planken	Schaan	47°11′3″N 9°32′1″E	One of the 4 exclaves of Planken (map)
Brunnenegg		Liechtenstein	Schaan	Planken	47°10′44″N 9°33′1″E	One of the 4 exclaves of Schaan (map)
Rüttistein		Liechtenstein	Vaduz	Planken	47°11′13″N 9°33′2″E	Two of the 6 exclaves of Vaduz (map)
Forst		Liechtenstein	Vaduz	Schaan	47°10′34″N 9°31′34″E	Two of the 6 exclaves of Vaduz (map)
(2 parcels)		Moldova	Dubăsari District	Transnistrian-controlled Dubăsari District	47°20.2′N 29°12.5′E, 47°22′9″N 29°17′42″E	Transnistria is de facto independent, but not recognised by any member states of the United Nations. Control of two highways (east of Roghi, west of Vasilievca) by Transnistria in this frozen conflict created these two neighbouring enclaves.
Condrița		Moldova	Chișinău municipality	Strășeni District (Scoreni commune)	47°03′20.4″N 28°34′13.6″E	
Văduleni		Moldova	Chișinău municipality	Criuleni district	47°4′12″N 29°4′53″E	
	~0.24	Moldova	Călărași District (Bahmut commune)	Ungheni District (Hîrcești commune)	47°20′21″N 28°6′44″E	
	~0.96	Moldova	Ocnița District (Unguri commune)	Dondușeni District	48°20′13″N 27°45′40″E	
	~0.45	Moldova	Călărași District (Vărzăreștii Noi commune)	Strășeni District	47°11′10″N 28°28′58″E	
	~2.1	Moldova	Orhei District (Peresecina commune)	Criuleni District	47°11′33″N 28°51′01″E	
Central Ulaanbaatar	3944	Mongolia	Ulaanbaatar	Töv Province	47°57′N 107°0′E	Ulaanbaatar is divided into three sections, of which two are enclaves
Bagakhangai	140	Mongolia	Ulaanbaatar	Töv Province	47°21′N 107°29′E	Ulaanbaatar is divided into three sections, of which two are enclaves
Sambú	1296.4	Panama	Comarca Emberá-Wounaan	Darién Province (Chepigana District)	7°51′N 78°8′W	
El Bale		Panama	Ngäbe-Buglé Comarca (Ñürüm)	Veraguas Province (Cañazas District)	8°21′N 81°22′W	
• Cerro Pelado and • (near El Piro)		Panama	Ngäbe-Buglé Comarca (Müna)	Veraguas Province (Las Palmas District)	8°10′N 81°32′W, 8°13′30″N 81°31′22.37″W	The unnamed parcel is a crescent-shaped forested area bordered by streams.
• Bakama and • (includes Trinidad)		Panama	Ngäbe-Buglé Comarca (Müna)	Chiriquí Province (Tolé District)	8°15.5′N 81°36′W, 8°13.9′N 81°34.7′W	The village of Trinidad appears to be the only population center in the unnamed parcel.
Lomopog		Philippines	Soccsksargen (Cotabato — Midsayap)	Bangsamoro	7°05.27′N 124°27.21′E	A barangay that became enclaved when its neighboring barangays seceded from Midsayap to join Bangsamoro as the new municipalities of Kadayangan and Nabalawag.
Southwestern Pikit		Philippines	Soccsksargen (Cotabato — Pikit)	Bangsamoro	7°01.15′N 124°35.29′E	Consists of barangays Damalasak, Katilacan, Kolambog, Paidu Pulangi, Pamalian, Punol, and Silik that became enclaved when their neighboring barangays seceded from Cotabato to join Bangsamoro as the new municipality of Tugunan.
Northeast Kapalawan-Old Kaabakan		Philippines	Bangsamoro (Special Geographic Area)	Soccsksargen (Cotabato)	7°14.08′N 124°49.29′E	Consists of barangays Buluan, Kitulaan, Langogan, Manarapan, Nanga-an, Pebpoloan, Pedtad, Simbuhay, Simone, and Tamped that seceded from Cotabato to join Bangsamoro. Some of these barangays are now the northeastern part of the new municipality of Kapalawan, while the rest are almost all the barangays of the new municipality of Old Kaabakan.
Sanggadong		Philippines	Bangsamoro (Special Geographic Area)	Soccsksargen (Cotabato)	7°8.16′N 124°52.90′E	A barangay that seceded from Kabacan, Cotabato to join Bangsamoro. It is now part of the new municipality of Old Kaabakan.
Zelenogradsky Administrative Okrug	37.22	Russia	Moscow	Moscow Oblast	55°59.3′N 37°11.7′E	
Vostochny (2 parcels)	3.20	Russia	Moscow (Eastern Administrative Okrug – Vostochny District)	Moscow Oblast (Balashikha Urban Okrug)	55°48.9′N 37°52.1′E, 55°49′27″N 37°52′19″E	These two enclaves within Moscow Oblast are separated only by the width of the road between them.
Akulovo (2 parcels)	~0.16 and ~0.024	Russia	Moscow (Eastern Administrative Okrug – Vostochny District)	Moscow Oblast	56°0.42′N 37°47.74′E, 56°0.2′N 37°47.6′E	Two small enclaves
Machikhino		Russia	Moscow (Troitsky Administrative Okrug – Kiyevsky Settlement)	Moscow Oblast (Naro-Fominsky District – Naro-Fominsky Urban Settlement)	55°19.2′N 36°54.9′E	Machikhino became part of "New Moscow" on 1 July 2012.
Arkhangelsky (2 parcels)		Russia	Moscow (Western Administrative Okrug – Kuntsevo District)	Moscow Oblast (Krasnogorsky District)	55°48′N 37°17.9′E, 55°47′N 37°20′E	Arkhangelsky became part of "New Moscow" on 1 July 2012. The smaller parcel has an area of 2.33 km^{2}.
Konezavod, VTB (i.e., "Stud Farm, VTB")	27.18	Russia	Moscow (Western Administrative Okrug – Kuntsevo District)	Moscow Oblast (Odintsovsky District)	55°43.8′N 37°0.8′E	This enclave became part of "New Moscow" on 1 July 2012, with bizarrely twisting borders that touch Krasnogorsky and Odintsovsky Districts and Zvenigorod Urban Okrug. Two landowners, MKZ "Moscow Stud Farm N1" (about 1100 hectares) and VTB Bank with 1,082 hectares, own nearly all of it.
(2 parcels)	~1.7	Russia	Tatarstan (Agryzsky District)	Udmurtia (Kiyasovsky District – Mushakovskoye rural settlement)	56°11.574′N 53°4.29′E, 56°11.826′N 53°5.418′E	Two enclaves
Novaya Kokshan	~3.0	Russia	Tatarstan (Mendeleyevsky District – Monashevskoye rural settlement)	Udmurtia (Grakhovsky District – Novogorskoye rural settlement)	56°3.6′N 52°12.96′E	Lies on the Kokshanka River
(4 parcels)		Russia	Tatarstan (Drozhzhanovsky District)	Chuvashia (Shemurshinsky District – Shemurshinskoye rural settlement)	54°52.854′N 47°18.36′E, 54°50.91′N 47°18.732′E, 54°52.344′N 47°20.858′E, 54°50′44″N 47°14′32″E	Four enclaves
upper Inesh valley	~2.4	Russia	Tatarstan (Kaybitsky District)	Chuvashia (Yantikovsky District)	55°22.908′N 47°43.11′E	
Novoye Bayderyakovo	~10	Russia	Chuvashia (Yalchiksky District – Lashch-Tayabinskoye rural settlement)	Tatarstan (Buinsky District)	55°0.972′N 48°6.18′E	
Chuvashskiye Entugany – Maksim Gorkiy	~1.2	Russia	Chuvashia (Shemurshinsky District – Chepkas-Nikolskoye rural settlement)	Tatarstan (Buinsky District)	54°54.66′N 47°50.1′E	
Kanash		Russia	Chuvashia (Shemurshinsky District – Chepkas-Nikolskoye rural settlement)	Tatarstan (Drozhzhanovsky District)	54°45.648′N 47°50.76′E	west of Malaya Tsilna
(3 parcels)		Russia	Chuvashia (Krasnochetaysky District – Atnarskoye rural settlement)	Nizhny Novgorod Oblast (Pilninsky District)	55°34.104′N 46°8.178′E, 55°34′2″N 46°7′16″E, 55°34′15″N 46°7′24″E	Three enclaves
(4 parcels)		Russia	Nizhny Novgorod Oblast (Pilninsky District)	Chuvashia (Krasnochetaysky District – Atnarskoye rural settlement)	55°31.584′N 46°8.55′E, 55°33.102′N 46°8.922′E, 55°32.484′N 46°7.4184′E, 55°32′47″N 46°6′3″E	Four enclaves
(3 parcels)	~55	Russia	Omsk Oblast (Krutinskiy District)	Tyumen Oblast (Abatskiy District)	56°0′54.97″N 70°46′36.01″E, 55°56′37.75″N 70°45′51.52″E, 56°22′40.08″N 70°47′35.34″E	Three enclaves
(2 parcels)	~13	Russia	Tyumen Oblast (Abatskiy District – Konevskoye rural settlement)	Omsk Oblast (Krutinskiy District)	56°20′36.85″N 71°3′18.4″E, 56°18′32.8″N 71°13′31.44″E	Two enclaves
(1 parcel)		Russia	Kemerovo Oblast (Novokuznetskiy District)	Altai Krai (Yeltsovsky District – Pushtulim village council)	53°21′N 86°47′E	One enclave
(1 parcel)		Russia	Tatarstan (Arsky District – Novokinerskoye rural settlement)	Mari El Republic (Morkinsky District – Shorunzhinskoye rural settlement)	56°29′32″N 49°32′29″E	One enclave
(1 parcel)		Russia	Tyumen Oblast (Nizhnetavdinsky District)	Sverdlovsk Oblast (Slobodo-Turinsky District – Slobodo-Turinsky Rural Settlement)	57°34.5′N 64°51.8′E	One enclave
(1 parcel)	~1.0	Russia	Penza Oblast (Mokshansky District)	Mordovia (Insarsky District – Sialeevsko-Pyatienskoye rural settlement)	53°41′09″N 44°28′12″E	One enclave
(1 parcel)		Russia	Mordovia (Kovylkinsky District)	Penza Oblast (Narovchatsky District – Novopichursky village council)	53°49′45.3″N 43°52′8.5″E	One enclave
(1 parcel)		Russia	Mordovia (Tengushevsky District – Dachnoye rural settlement)	Ryazan Oblast (Kadomsky District – Kushchapinskoye rural settlement)	54°31′47.6″N 42°36′8″E	One enclave
Mukhanov		Russia	Ryazan Oblast (Kadomsky District – Kushchapinskoye rural settlement)	Mordovia (Tengushevsky District – Dachnoye rural settlement)	54°33.4′N 42°38.9′E	One enclave
(1 parcel)		Russia	Kaluga Oblast (Mosalsky District – Derevnya Lyudkovo rural settlement)	Smolensk Oblast (Ugransky District – Vskhodskoye rural settlement)	54°41′7″N 34°25′24.5″E	One enclave
Porzhala tract		Russia	Arkhangelsk Oblast (Kargopolsky District – Ukhotskoye rural settlement)	Vologda Oblast (Vytegorsky District – Kemsky Rural Settlement)	61°2′31″N 38°4′0″E	One enclave
(1 parcel)		Russia	Sverdlovsk Oblast (Achitsky District)	Perm Krai (Suksunsky District)	57°4′0″N 57°52′3″E	One enclave
(3 parcels)		Russia	Kirov Oblast (Verkhnekamsky District – Lesnoye urban settlement)	Perm Krai (Gaynsky District)	60°48′N 52°22′E, 60°43.5′N 52°2.5′E, 60°38′N 51°59′E	
Chursya	~0.8	Russia	Kirov Oblast (Oparinsky District – Oparinskoye urban settlement)	Komi Republic (Priluzsky District – Noshul rural settlement)	60°1′N 48°37′E	
Khoseda-Khardsky	5.12	Russia	Nenets Autonomous Okrug (Zapolyarny District)	Komi Republic (Inta urban district)	66°50′N 59°32′E	
Khvoyny		Russia	Saint Petersburg (Krasnoselsky District – Krasnoye Selo)	Leningrad Oblast (Gatchinsky District – Taitskoye urban settlement)	59°40.5′N 30°4.4′E	
(1 parcel)	~31	Russia	Samara Oblast (Kinel-Cherkassky District)	Orenburg Oblast (Buguruslansky District – Pilyuginsky village council)	53°22′N 52°16′E	
(1 parcel)	~1.5	Russia	Ulyanovsk Oblast (Starokulatkinsky District – Starokulatkinskoye urban settlement)	Saratov Oblast (Khvalynsky District – Yelshanskoye municipal formation)	52°37′N 47°50′E	
(1 parcel)		Russia	Udmurtia (Sarapulsky District – Oktyabrskoye rural settlement)	Perm Krai (Chaykovsky urban district)	56°37′N 53°58′E	
• Kirgisul and • Yuferovskoye		Russia	Krasnoyarsk Krai (Sharypovsky District)	Khakassia (Ordzhonikidzevsky District – Ordzhonikidze village council)	55°23.4′N 88°34.9′E, 55°17.6′N 88°39.4′E	
(1 parcel)		Russia	Astrakhan Oblast (Limansky District)	Kalmykia	45°30′N 46°41′E	
(2 parcels)		Russia	Kalmykia (Chernozemelsky District – Narynkhuduk rural municipal formation)	Astrakhan Oblast (Limansky District)	45°46′N 46°58′E, 46°5′N 47°5′E	
Cerca de Villaño	0.0036	Spain	Basque Country (Biscay – Orduña-Urduña)	Castile and León (Province of Burgos – Valle de Losa)	42°58′09″N 3°07′21″W	
Cezura; Lastrilla	~1.7; ~5.0	Spain	Castile and León (Province of Palencia – Pomar de Valdivia)	Cantabria (Valderredible)	42°49′N 4°10.2′W, 42°48.7′N 4°5.9′W	Two enclaves
Dehesa de la Cepeda	~14	Spain	Community of Madrid (Santa María de la Alameda)	Castile and León	40°39.8′N 4°17.3′W	On the northern slopes of Sierra de Guadarrama
Los Barrancos	1.26	Spain	Castile-La Mancha (Province of Guadalajara – Torrejón del Rey)	Community of Madrid	40°38′N 3°22.3′W	
Petilla de Aragón; Los Bastanes	27.55	Spain	Navarre	Aragon (Province of Zaragoza)	42°27.5′N 1°5.5′W, 42°25.3′N 1°10′W	Petilla de Aragón is a municipality in northern Spain formed by these two enclaves.
Sajuela; El Ternero	3.5	Spain	Castile and León (Province of Burgos – Miranda de Ebro)	La Rioja	42°36.6′N 2°59.4′W, 42°36.1′N 2°56.1′W	Two enclaves
Treviño	279.58	Spain	Castile and León (Province of Burgos)	Basque Country (Álava)	42°44′N 2°42′W	
Valle de Villaverde	19.53	Spain	Cantabria	Basque Country (Biscay)	43°14′N 3°17′W	
Fahr Abbey	0.0148	Switzerland	Aargau (Baden District – Würenlos)	Canton of Zurich (Dietikon District – Unterengstringen)	47°24′30″N 8°26′21″E	From 1803 through 2007 this Benedictine convent was not part of a municipality.
Grimmenstein monastery		Switzerland	Appenzell Innerrhoden (Oberegg District)	Appenzell Ausserrhoden (Walzenhausen)	47°26′36″N 9°36′46″E	
Wonnenstein Friary		Switzerland	Appenzell Innerrhoden (Schlatt-Haslen)	Appenzell Ausserrhoden (Teufen)	47°23′11″N 9°21′45″E	
Münchenwiler	2.5	Switzerland	Canton of Bern (Bern-Mittelland)	Canton of Fribourg (See District)	46°54.7′N 7°7.5′E	
• Surpierre and • Vuissens	10.43	Switzerland	Canton of Fribourg (Broye District)	Vaud	46°44.7′N 6°50.5′E, 46°44.1′N 6°46.2′E	Surpierre includes the villages of Surpierre, Villeneuve, Cheiry and Prèvond-avaux.
Wallenbuch	1.4	Switzerland	Canton of Fribourg (See District – Gurmels)	Canton of Bern (Bern-Mittelland)	46°55.9′N 7°13.5′E	
La Grande/La Petite Coudre (Céligny)		Switzerland	Canton of Geneva (Céligny)	Vaud (Nyon District)	46°20′54″N 6°10′24″E	The municipality of Céligny consists of two exclaves of the Canton of Geneva within the Canton of Vaud. The smaller of the two is enclaved within Vaud. The larger one also has a water border with France and thus is not an enclave.
Steinhof	1.64	Switzerland	Canton of Solothurn (Wasseramt District – Aeschi)	Canton of Bern (Oberaargau)	47°9.5′N 7°41.2′E	
Slavutych	2.53	Ukraine	Kyiv Oblast	Chernihiv Oblast	51°31.8′N 30°43.5′E	
Kotsiubynske	0.87	Ukraine	Kyiv Oblast (Irpin)	Kyiv (Sviatoshyn)	50°29.3′N 30°20′E	
• the above-water part of Liberty Island and • the original portion of Ellis Island not created by landfill	0.0785	United States	New York (New York City – Manhattan)	New Jersey (Hudson County – Jersey City)	40°41.4′N 74°2.7′W, 40°41′59″N 74°2′22″W	The size of the original portion of Ellis Island and its environs is 4.68 acres (0.0189 km^{2} ) of the overall area of 27.5 acres. From a 1998 U.S. Supreme Court decision it follows that a seawall that was completed in 1914 made the original Ellis Island a true enclave within New Jersey.
• (main part of city), • Ulugbek	334.8	Uzbekistan	Tashkent	Tashkent Province	41°18′N 69°16′E, 41°24′10″N 69°27′14″E	
• (includes Khanabad and others)		Uzbekistan	Tashkent Province (Zangiata District)	Tashkent	41°13′56″N 69°15′56″E	

=== Other subnational ===
- In Australia:
  - The larger of the two parts of the Aboriginal Shire of Doomadgee in Queensland is surrounded by the Shire of Burke. Except for the ocean, the smaller part is nearly surrounded also by the Shire of Burke.
- In China:
  - Chaoyang District has one exclave that comprises Terminals 1 and 2 of Beijing Capital International Airport and the immediately surrounding service area. It is an enclave of Shunyi that used to be Shunyi Subdistrict of Chaoyang District. The main reason for the existence of this exclave is because the financing for the building of these Terminals was largely carried by Chaoyang District and this political organisation ensures that they continue to pay taxes to Chaoyang District. Note: Terminal 3 is not a part of this exclave as it was built for the 2008 Summer Olympics and was built after the formation of Shunyi District. See a map of the exclave, not including Terminal 3, on Google Maps.
- In Croatia:
  - In Osijek-Baranja County, the municipality of Bilje has one exclave (Zlatna Greda) inside the municipality of Kneževi Vinogradi.
- In Estonia:
  - In Ida-Viru County, the town of Kohtla-Järve consists of five separated areas within a distance of 22 km. Of these exclaves, Kukruse and Oru districts are also enclaves, since they are surrounded by Toila Parish.
  - Kudruküla and Olgina districts of Narva town are surrounded by the town of Narva-Jõesuu.
- In France (départements):
  - Meurthe-et-Moselle has one exclave inside Meuse.
  - Nord has one exclave in Pas-de-Calais.
  - Oise has three exclaves in Aisne: one comprises the village of Chavres, while the other two are uninhabited parcels of land in the Forest of Retz.
- In Germany: Brunn is an exclave of Nuremberg, Middle Franconia, Bavaria.
- In Indonesia:
  - The district of Mulyorejo in Surabaya has an exclave inside the neighbouring Sukolilo district.
  - In Kutai Kartanegara Regency, the village of Sumber Sari is an enclave of Kota Bangun Darat district, located inside Kota Bangun.
- In India, the district of Kangpokpi in Manipur state has an exclave that is an enclave within Imphal East district.
- In Italy:
  - In Aosta Valley: the municipality of La Magdeleine has an exclave within the municipality of Antey-Saint-André.
  - In Apulia: the Metropolitan City of Bari (the municipality of Locorotondo) has three exclaves inside the Province of Taranto;
    - In the Metropolitan City of Bari: Castellana Grotte has an exclave within Alberobello and one within Conversano; Polignano a Mare has two exclaves inside Conversano; Santeramo in Colle has an exclave within Cassano delle Murge; Terlizzi has an exclave inside Ruvo di Puglia.
    - In the Province of Taranto: Massafra has five exclaves inside Crispiano; Taranto has an exclave inside Grottaglie.
    - In the Province of Foggia: San Marco in Lamis has an exclave inside San Giovanni Rotondo; Manfredonia has one exclave inside San Giovanni Rotondo, and San Giovanni Rotondo has one inside Manfredonia; San Severo has two exclaves inside Foggia; Pietramontecorvino has four exclaves inside Lucera; Stornara has two exclaves inside Orta Nova.
  - In Basilicata: the Province of Matera has an exclave inside the Province of Potenza.
  - In Campania: Pannarano is an exclave of the Province of Benevento inside the Province of Avellino.
    - In the Province of Caserta: Caserta has three exclaves inside Capua.
    - In the Metropolitan City of Naples: Ottaviano has two small exclaves within Nola.
  - In Friuli-Venezia Giulia: Grimacco has an enclave within Drenchia, and Drenchia has one in Grimacco.
  - In Lombardy
    - In the Province of Pavia: Pieve del Cairo has enclave inside Mezzana Bigli.
  - In Marche: the Province of Pesaro and Urbino (the municipality of Monte Porzio) has two small exclaves within the Province of Ancona.
  - In Molise:
    - In the Province of Campobasso: Montenero di Bisaccia has an exclave inside Tavenna.
  - In Piedmont, the Province of Cuneo has an enclave (Carutti in the municipality of Barge) inside the Metropolitan City of Turin.
    - In the Province of Asti, Soglio has two and Cinaglio one exclave inside Camerano Casasco.
    - In the Metropolitan City of Turin, Carignano has three exclaves inside Carmagnola.
  - In Sicily, the Metropolitan City of Palermo has an enclave within Agrigento (San Biagio); the province of Caltanissetta has an enclave within Palermo (Resuttano); and the province of Enna has an enclave within Caltanissetta.
    - In the Metropolitan City of Palermo: Roccapalumba has an exclave within Caccamo.
    - In the Province of Trapani: Gibellina has a small exclave within Santa Ninfa.
    - In the Province of Enna: Piazza Armerina has one exclave within Enna and another one within Aidone.
    - In the Province of Caltanissetta: Serradifalco has an exclave inside Caltanissetta.
  - In Trentino-Alto Adige/Südtirol:
    - In the Autonomous Province of Trentino: Pellizzano has an exclave within Peio; Calliano has an exclave inside Besenello.
- In Japan:
  - The Aichi Prefecture town and city on Kōta, has an exclave surrounded by Nishio.
  - The ward of Nagoya has an enclave, also known Honjigaoka, that is surrounded by Owariasahi.
  - The city of Fujiyoshida and town of Fujikawaguchiko in Yamanashi Prefecture have enclaves within each other:
    - Fujiyoshida in has two exclaves within Fujikawaguchiko.
    - Fujikawaguchiko has three exclaves within Fujiyoshida, one being a Shinto Shrine on Mount Fuji.
  - The city of Funabashi, Chiba Prefecture, has an enclave surrounded by Kamagaya
  - The town of Kasagi, Kyoto has an exclave surrounded by the city of Kizugawa
  - The city of Ide, Kyoto has an exclave surrounded by Kizugawa.
  - The town of Kumiyama, Kyoto has an exclave surrounded by Uji
- In Norway
  - Sandefjord Municipality has one exclave, Himberg, located inside the neighbouring Larvik Municipality.
  - Malvik Municipality includes three farmsteads, Øvre Jøsås, Store Jøsås and Lille Jøsås, forming two separate enclaves that are surrounded by Stjørdal Municipality. The eastern enclave at 63°20′52″N 10°52′37″E consists of Øvre Jøsås and Store Jøsås, while Lille Jøsås is the western enclave at 63°20′48″N 10°51′44″E. The closest distance between the two enclaves was only about 8 metres (26 ft).
- In the Philippines:
  - Manila South Cemetery is an exclave of the district of San Andres, located in the capital city of Manila. It is divided and surrounded by Makati.
- In Poland:
  - Two fragments of the village of Jaworze in the municipality of Jaworze, which belong to Bielsko County, Silesian Voivodeship, are surrounded by the municipality of Brena in Cieszyn County, Silesian Voivodeship. One exclave has an area of c. 2 ha and lies around 10 m from the rest of the county, while the other exclave has an area of c. 5 ha and lies around 50 m from the rest of the county. Both exclaves lie around 80 m from each other.
  - A plot of land, No. 2056, which belongs to the city-county of Gdynia is an exclave surrounded by the municipality of Kosakowo in Puck County, Pomeranian Voivodeship.
  - A small portion of the municipality of Goczałkowice-Zdrój, which belongs to Pszczyna County, Silesian Voivodeship, is an exclave surrounded by the municipality of Chybie in Cieszyn County, Silesian Voivodeship. It is separated from the rest of the county by a narrow strip of land, with a width of around 35 m, which contains the railway tracks owned by Cieszyn County.
  - Two small fragments of the village of Koźminiec in the municipality of Dobrzyca in Pleszew County, Greater Poland Voivodeship, are exclaves surrounded by the municipality of Rozdrażew in Krotoszyn County, Greater Poland Voivodeship.
  - The village of Lisek, which belongs to the municipality of Fabianki, in Włocławek County, Kuyavian–Pomeranian Voivodeship, is separated from the rest of the county by the municipalities of Lipno and Bobrowniki in Lipno County, Kuyavian-Pomeranian Voivodeship. The enclave has an area of c. 5 km² and is located about 1.5 km from the rest of municipality.
  - A small portion of the village of Chyża located within Zamość County, Lublin Voivodeship, is an enclave, which is an exclave separated from the rest of the village by a strip of land that belongs to the city-county of Zamość. The exclave has an area of c. 10.5 ha, while the strip of land separating it has a width of 90 m.
  - A small portion of the municipality of Zduńska Wola, which belongs to Zduńska Wola County, Łódź Voivodeship, is an exclave surrounded by the municipality of Sieradz in Sieradz County, Łódź Voivodeship. The exclave has an area of c. 1.2 km² and is located about 100 m from the main portion of the county.
- In Portugal, as a consequence of administrative reforms during the 19th century (in the 1830s, then again in the 1850s, and to a much lesser extent in the 1890s), as well as more recent legislation forbidding the creation of territorial discontinuities, there are almost no sub-national exclaves or enclaves, and the few that persist are on the municipal or civil parish level:
  - In the Coimbra municipality, the civil parish of Taveiro has an exclave that is enclaved within the civil parish of Ribeira de Frades.
  - In the Vila Real de Santo António municipality, the entire civil parish of Vila Nova de Cacela is an exclave that is enclaved within the Castro Marim municipality.
- In Russia, within the city of Moscow, the Western Administrative Okrug has three exclaves that are not exclaves of Moscow itself. Two of them make up Vnukovo District, and one of these is enclaved by the Novomoskovsky Administrative Okrug. Vnukovo was an exclave of Moscow until the 2012 creation of "New Moscow".
- In Spain the following provincial level exclaves that are also enclaves exist:
  - In Andalusia, Villar is an exclave of the province of Córdoba within the province of Seville.
  - In Castile and León:
    - Dehesa de San Llorente is an exclave of the province of Valladolid within the province of León.
    - Villodrigo and Aguanares are exclaves of the province of Palencia within the province of Burgos.
    - La Rebolleda is an exclave of the province of Burgos within the province of Palencia.
  - In Catalonia:
    - Can Vies is an exclave of the province of Tarragona within the province of Barcelona.
    - Malagarriga is an exclave of the province of Lleida within the province of Barcelona.
    - Rovira de Baix is an exclave of the province of Girona within the province of Barcelona.
    - Valielles and Sant Pere de Graudescales are exclaves of the province of Barcelona within the province of Lleida.
- In Sweden many municipalities have exclaves (most notably the municipalities of Dalarna County).
- In the United States of America:
  - In Alaska, the community of Klukwan is surrounded by Haines Borough, even though the community is part of the Hoonah-Angoon Census Area, which is in turn part of the Unorganized Borough.
  - In California
    - San Jose has eight exclaves surrounded by unincorporated Santa Clara County, one of which is connected at a quadripoint.
    - Vacaville has two exclaves, both surrounded by unincorporated Solano County. One is separated from the main city limits by the unincorporated village of Elmira.
    - Adelanto has three exclaves, surrounded by incorporated Victorville.
    - San Bernardino has two exclaves, surrounded by unincorporated San Bernardino County.
    - Loma Linda has three exclaves, surrounded by the city of San Bernardino
    - Redlands has four exclaves. One surrounded by the city of San Bernardino, and three surrounded by unincorporated San Bernardino county
  - In Colorado, Arapahoe County has seven exclaves within the City and County of Denver, including the city of Glendale and the unincorporated neighborhood of Holly Hills. In turn, Denver has a counter-exclave surrounded by Glendale. Jefferson County also has five exclaves, three of which are surrounded by Denver. Additionally, Boulder and Weld counties both have an exclave within the City and County of Broomfield, and Broomfield has an exclave in Boulder County.
  - In Georgia, Bibb County has an exclave within Monroe County. This boundary is disputed, however.
  - In Kentucky, following the merger of the Louisville and Jefferson County governments in 2003, the new Louisville Metro has several disjoint parcels of land throughout the county, of which some are enclaves in other cities.
  - In Minnesota, Mendota Heights has an exclave that is surrounded by Lilydale.
  - In New Jersey, Middletown Township in Monmouth County has an exclave surrounded by the borough of Keansburg.
  - In Ohio:
    - In Montgomery County, there are several cities with enclaves and exclaves. Dayton has one exclave, consisting of Dayton International Airport. Dayton also surrounds several enclaves that belong to the cities of Trotwood and Riverside. Riverside also has several exclaves that border more than one city as well as additional parcels that are connected to the city only by a roadway. Clayton contains several enclaves surrounded by Englewood and one that is completely surrounded by Union. Other than Dayton's exclave, these enclaves and exclaves were formed by municipality-township mergers in the 1990s.
    - In Summit County:
      - The city of Cuyahoga Falls has four small enclave/exclaves along its border with the city of Akron. Several houses along Smith Road are legally in the Falls, while neighbors and municipal lands on all sides of the properties are legally within Akron.
      - Bath Township has four exclaves, of which one is an enclave of Akron.
      - Springfield Township has six exclaves, of which two are enclaves in Akron.
      - Coventry Township has six exclaves, of which five are enclaves in Akron. Two of these are joined at a quadripoint.
      - Twinsburg Township has seven exclaves, of which four are enclaves in the city of Twinsburg. The city in turn has one piece connected by only a quadripoint, otherwise surrounded by the township.
  - In Oregon, the location of several businesses, including the world headquarters of Nike, Inc., is surrounded by the city of Beaverton, but is within unincorporated Washington County.
  - In Pennsylvania, Cumru Township in Berks County has two exclaves, both separated by the city of Reading, and one of them is an enclave in Reading.
  - In Tennessee:
    - Loudon County, Tennessee has two exclaves, one of which is surrounded by Monroe County. There is a third parcel connected at a quadripoint, but otherwise surrounded by Roane County.
    - Dickson County has an exclave surrounded by Cheatham County.
    - Davidson County has an exclave surrounded by Wilson County.
  - In Virginia, Fairfax County has an exclave within the City of Fairfax that houses the county courthouse and some other county governmental offices. Prince William County has an exclave within the City of Manassas that houses the county courthouse and some other county governmental offices. Montgomery County has a small exclave consisting of two houses inside the independent city of Radford. Note that in Virginia, communities that are incorporated as cities are completely separate from counties; see Political subdivisions of Virginia.

== Enclaves that are not exclaves ==
Lesotho (shown in red) is completely surrounded by South Africa

Each enclave listed in this section has a legal status equivalent to the one other entity that entirely surrounds it. None of the enclaves has a separate main region of which it is a part.

=== National level ===
Some enclaves are sovereign states, completely surrounded by another one, and therefore not exclaves. Three such sovereign countries exist:

The same logic applies to many of the sub-national enclaves listed immediately following.

Country	Area (km^{2})	Enclaved within	Coordinates	Notes
Lesotho	30,355	South Africa	29.6°S 28.3°E	
San Marino	61.2	Italy	43°56′30″N 12°27′30″E	
Vatican City	0.44	Italy (Metropolitan City of Rome Capital – Rome)	41°54.2′N 12°27.2′E	

=== First-order subnational level ===
Name	Area (km^{2})	Parent Country	Enclaved within	Coordinates	Notes
Australian Capital Territory	2358	Australia	New South Wales	35.5°S 149°E	
Vienna	414.65	Austria	Lower Austria	48°13′N 16°24′E	Vienna was the capital of Lower Austria until 1922, when it became a state of its own. Between 1922 and 1986, Lower Austria did not have its own capital, and the state's administration had its seat in Vienna.
Mingachevir	47	Azerbaijan	Yevlakh District	40°45′N 46°59′E	
Naftalan	3.57263	Azerbaijan	Goranboy District	40°30.5′N 46°49′E	
Shaki	9	Azerbaijan	Shaki District	41°12′N 47°10.1′E	
Khankendi/Stepanakert	29.12	Azerbaijan	Khojaly District/Askeran Province	39°49.3′N 46°45.3′E	
Yevlakh	95	Azerbaijan	Yevlakh District	40°36.8′N 47°8.5′E	
Brussels	161.38	Belgium	Flemish Region (Flemish Brabant)	50°50′N 4°22′E	
Phnom Penh	678.46	Cambodia	Kandal Province	11°33.5′N 104°52.5′E	
Prague	496	Czech Republic	Central Bohemian Region	50°4′N 14°28′E	City serves as Region's capital
Frederiksberg	8.7	Denmark	Copenhagen	55°40.9′N 12°31.5′E	
Addis Ababa	527	Ethiopia	Oromia Region (Oromia Special Zone Surrounding Finfinne)	8°59′N 38°47.5′E	
Harari Region	334	Ethiopia	Oromia Region (East Hararghe Zone)	9°17′N 42°11′E	
Berlin	891.7	Germany	Brandenburg	52.5°N 13.4°E	
Budapest	525.2	Hungary	Pest County	47.5°N 19.1°E	City serves as County's capital.
Almaty	682	Kazakhstan	Almaty Province	43°17′N 76°56′E	
Astana	710.2	Kazakhstan	Akmola Province	51°11.3′N 71°26.2′E	
Baikonur	57	Kazakhstan	Kyzylorda Province	45°52′N 63°20′E	
Bishkek	127	Kyrgyzstan	Chüy Region	42°53′N 74°36′E	
Daugavpils	72.48	Latvia	Augšdaugava Municipality	55°53.4′N 26°32.9′E	City serves as Municipality's capital
Jelgava	60.56	Latvia	Jelgava Municipality	56°38′54″N 23°42′50″E	City serves as Municipality's capital
Rēzekne	17.48	Latvia	Rēzekne Municipality	56°30.6′N 27°20.5′E	City serves as Municipality's capital
Kuala Lumpur	243	Malaysia	Selangor	3°8.6′N 101°41′E	
Putrajaya	49	Malaysia	Selangor (Sepang District)	2°55.8′N 101°41.5′E	
Bamako	245	Mali	Koulikoro Region (Kati Cercle)	12°37′N 7°59′W	
Darkhan-Uul Province	3275	Mongolia	Selenge Province	49°22′N 106°18′E	
Niamey	239.3	Niger	Tillabéri Region	13°31.2′N 2°6.5′E	
Taipei	271.8	Taiwan	New Taipei City	25°5′N 121°33′E	
Bucharest	228	Romania	Ilfov County	44°26′N 26°6′E	
Adygea	7600	Russia	Krasnodar Krai	44.6°N 40°E	
Gwangju	501.24	South Korea	South Jeolla Province	35°9′N 126°50′E	
Damascus Governorate	1599	Syria	Rif Dimashq Governorate	33°30′N 36°22′E	
Dushanbe	124.6	Tajikistan	Districts of Republican Subordination	38°33.6′N 68°45.9′E	City serves as Region's capital
Arima	12	Trinidad and Tobago	Tunapuna–Piarco	10°37.9′N 61°16.6′W	
Kyiv	839	Ukraine	Kyiv Oblast	50°26′N 30°32′E	City serves as Oblast's capital
Sanaa	126	Yemen	Sanaa Governorate	15°25′N 44°14′E	City of Sanaa serves as capital of both Governorates

=== Other subnational ===
- In Australia:
  - In New South Wales, the City of Broken Hill is surrounded by the Unincorporated Far West Region.
  - In South Australia:
    - The District Council of Coober Pedy is surrounded by the Outback Communities Authority.
    - The City of Mount Gambier is surrounded by the District Council of Grant.
    - The Municipal Council of Roxby Downs is surrounded by the Outback Communities Authority.
  - In Queensland
    - The Cherbourg Aboriginal Shire Council is surrounded by the South Burnett Regional Council.
  - In the Northern Territory
    - The Town of Alice Springs is surrounded by the MacDonnell Regional Council.
  - In Victoria, a few unincorporated areas for ski resorts form enclaves within the surrounding shires: Falls Creek and Mount Hotham within Alpine Shire and Mount Baw Baw in Baw Baw Shire. In addition, Mount Buller and Mount Stirling share a border with each other, but are surrounded by Mansfield Shire.
- In Austria: In Tyrol, Innsbruck-Land District completely surrounds the district of Innsbruck.
- In Brazil:
  - In Goiás: Portelândia is surrounded by Mineiros.
  - In Mato Grosso do Sul: Ladário is surrounded by Corumbá.
  - In Rio Grande do Sul: Arroio do Padre is surrounded by Pelotas.
  - In São Paulo: Águas de São Pedro is surrounded by São Pedro.
- In Canada:
  - In Quebec, the city of Westmount, the town of Mount Royal, and, collectively, the municipalities of Hampstead, Côte Saint-Luc and Montreal West (Montréal-Ouest) are all enclaves in the city of Montreal. Similarly, the city of L'Ancienne-Lorette is an enclave in Quebec City after the demerger on 1 January 2006.
- In the People's Republic of China: In the Xinjiang autonomous region, the prefecture-level city of Karamay (that has two non-contiguous parts) and the county-level city of Kuytun (a part of the Ili Kazakh Autonomous Prefecture) are completely surrounded by the Tacheng Prefecture (that is also technically part of the Ili Kazakh Autonomous Prefecture).
- In Colombia, in the Capital District, La Candelaria locality is an enclave within Santa Fe locality.
- In Estonia, two towns are enclaves, surrounded by a single parish:
  - Viljandi town is surrounded by Viljandi Parish
  - Võru town is surrounded by Võru Parish
- In Ethiopia:
  - The town and woreda of Debre Berhan is an enclave inside Basona Werana ("Baso and Werana") woreda, located in the Semien Shewa Zone in the Amhara Region.
  - The city and separate woreda of Gambela is surrounded by Gambela Zuria ("Greater Gambela") woreda, located in the Anuak Zone in the Gambela Region.
  - The city and special zone of Mek'ele (comprising two woredas) is an enclave within Enderta woreda, located in the Debub Misraqawi (Southeastern) Zone in the Tigray Region.
  - The town and woreda of Weldiya is an enclave inside Guba Lafto woreda, located in the Semien Wollo Zone in the Amhara Region.
  - The town and woreda of Debre Marqos is an enclave inside Guzamn woreda, located in the Misraq Gojjam Zone in the Amhara Region.
- In Finland:
  - The town of Kauniainen is enclosed by the city of Espoo. The two are located west of Helsinki, in the Helsinki Metropolitan Area.
  - The municipality of Enonkoski is encircled by the city of Savonlinna.
- In Iceland, the municipality of Hveragerði is an enclave in Sveitarfélagið Ölfus.
- In Indonesia:
  - In North Sumatra:
    - Padang Sidempuan City is surrounded by South Tapanuli Regency.
    - Pematangsiantar City is surrounded by Simalungun Regency.
    - Tanjungbalai City is surrounded by Asahan Regency.
    - Tebing Tinggi City is surrounded by Serdang Bedagai Regency.
  - In West Sumatra:
    - Bukittinggi City is surrounded by Agam Regency.
    - Payakumbuh City is surrounded by Lima Puluh Kota Regency.
  - In Jambi, Jambi City is surrounded by Muaro Jambi Regency.
  - In West Java:
    - Bogor City is surrounded by Bogor Regency.
    - Sukabumi City is surrounded by Sukabumi Regency.
  - In Central Java:
    - Magelang City is surrounded by Magelang Regency.
    - Salatiga City is surrounded by Semarang Regency.
  - In East Java:
    - Blitar City is surrounded by Blitar Regency.
    - Kediri City is surrounded by Kediri Regency.
    - Malang City is surrounded by Malang Regency.
  - In East Kalimantan, Samarinda City is surrounded by Kutai Kartanegara Regency.
  - In North Sulawesi, Tomohon City is surrounded by Minahasa Regency.
- In Ireland:
  - In Kildare County Council, Naas Urban Electoral division is surrounded by Naas Rural ED.
- In Italy:
  - In Apulia, in the Province of Lecce, the municipality of Surbo is an enclave inside the municipality of Lecce.
  - In Sicily:
    - In the Province of Agrigento: San Giovanni Gemini is an enclave inside Cammarata.
    - In the Province of Catania: Maletto is an enclave within Bronte and meets Bronte and eight other municipalities (Adrano, Belpasso, Biancavilla, Castiglione di Sicilia, Nicolosi, Randazzo, Sant'Alfio, Zafferana Etnea) at one point at the top of Mount Etna.
  - In Trentino-Alto Adige/Südtirol:
    - In the Autonomous Province of Trentino: Samone is an enclave inside Castel Ivano.
- In Israel, the political system where regional councils are distinct from city councils leads to a plethora of subnational enclaves. For instance,
  - Sderot is an enclave within the Sha'ar HaNegev Regional Council.
  - The Bedouin towns of Rahat and Laqiya, as well as the suburb of Lehavim, are enclaves within the Bnei Shimon Regional Council.
  - Yeruham and Mitzpe Ramon are enclaves in Ramat HaNegev Regional Council.
  - Beit She'an is an enclave within the Emek HaMaayanot Regional Council.
- In Lithuania, a few city municipalities are enclaved in the district municipalities of the same names, including Šiauliai, Panevėžys, and Alytus.
- In Mexico, in the state of Nuevo León, the municipality of Hualahuises is surrounded by the municipality of Linares.
- In New Zealand, the Kawerau District territorial authority is completely surrounded by the Whakatāne District.
- In North Korea, in South Pyongan province, Ch'ŏngnam district is an enclave in Mundŏk county.
- In Poland, the municipal neighbourhood of Etap, in the city of Warsaw, within the district of Ursynów, is an enclave surrounded by the municipal neighbourhood of Jeziorki. Both were established in 1996.
- In the Republic of China (Taiwan): Chiayi City is an enclave of Chiayi County.
- In Romania, București – Ilfov development region is enclaved within the Sud (South) development region.
- In Togo, in Centrale Region, the prefecture of Blitta is surrounded by the prefecture of Sotouboua.
- In the United Kingdom:
  - The English unitary authorities of Nottingham, Derby, Stoke-on-Trent, and Leicester are enclaves in the administrative counties of Nottinghamshire, Derbyshire, Staffordshire, and Leicestershire, respectively.
  - In Cambridgeshire: the City of Cambridge is a local government district completely surrounded by the district of South Cambridgeshire.
  - In Cheshire: the unpopulated civil parish of Chester Castle is completely surrounded by the unparished area of Chester. Both form part of the borough of Cheshire West and Chester.
  - In Staffordshire the civil parish of Stone is an enclave of the civil parish of Stone Rural.
  - The City of London is a ceremonial county enclaved within, and distinct from, that of Greater London.
  - Two parliamentary constituencies in the United Kingdom may also be described as enclaves: the constituencies of Bath and York Central are completely surrounded by the constituencies of North East Somerset and York Outer, respectively.
- In the United States of America:
  - In Arizona:
    - The Hopi Reservation is surrounded by the Navajo Reservation.
    - The city of South Tucson is an enclave in the city of Tucson.
  - In Arkansas, the City of Cammack Village is an enclave of Little Rock.
  - In California:
    - In 1956, Newark withdrew from the incorporation of the communities of Washington Township as the city of Fremont and is now surrounded by Fremont.
    - Piedmont incorporated in 1907 to avoid annexation by Oakland and is now surrounded by Oakland.
    - San Pablo, along with two small unincorporated areas, is completely surrounded by Richmond
    - The city of San Fernando is an enclave in the city of Los Angeles. Beverly Hills and West Hollywood together form another. Culver City and the unincorporated community of Ladera Heights form a third enclave.
    - The city of Signal Hill is entirely surrounded by the city of Long Beach.
    - The city of Villa Park is an enclave of the city of Orange.
    - The unincorporated area of Broadmoor is surrounded by Daly City.
    - The unincorporated area of Fig Garden is surrounded by Fresno.
    - Many other California cities have small enclaves of unincorporated area.
  - In Florida, the town of Baldwin is an enclave within the city of Jacksonville. The Village of Lazy Lake is contained entirely within the borders of the city of Wilton Manors.
  - In Georgia, Remerton is an enclave of Valdosta; similarly, Payne City was an enclave within the city of Macon until it was dissolved in 2015.
  - In Idaho, Garden City is an enclave in the city of Boise.
  - In Illinois, Norridge and Harwood Heights together form an enclave in the city of Chicago.
  - In Indiana, after the passage of Unigov in 1970 by the state legislature that merged the government of Indianapolis and Marion County, four cities remained independent and did not merge with Indianapolis – three of those cities Beech Grove, Southport, and Speedway became enclaves of Indianapolis.
  - In Iowa, the city of University Heights is entirely surrounded by Iowa City.
  - In Kansas, the city of Eastborough is entirely surrounded by Wichita.
  - In Kentucky, when the governments of Louisville and Jefferson County merged in 2003, a bewildering array of enclaves was created, as all other incorporated cities in Jefferson County retained their status as separate cities. Note that the entire Ohio River between the northern and southern low-water marks is now part of Louisville Metro.
    - Three other cities were, and still are, enclaved in cities other than Louisville:
      - Norbourne Estates and Richlawn are enclaves of St. Matthews.
      - Woodland Hills is an enclave of Middletown.
    - The merger created many other enclaves within the portion of Louisville Metro that includes pre-merger Louisville but excludes all other pre-existing cities, an entity defined by the United States Census Bureau as the "Louisville-Jefferson County balance". As municipalities, these enclaves are not parts of the "balance," but rather, they are surrounded by the "balance."
      - These individual enclaves: Creekside, Fincastle, Glenview Hills, Hickory Hill, Hills and Dales, Hollow Creek, Hollyvilla, Lynnview, Minor Lane Heights, Shively, South Park View, Spring Mill, and Thornhill.
      - The combination of Cambridge, Houston Acres, Lincolnshire, and St. Regis Park.
      - The combination of Poplar Hills, Watterson Park, and West Buechel.
      - The aforementioned cities of Middletown, Norbourne Estates, Richlawn, St. Matthews, and Woodland Hills, along with 46 other municipalities are part of a large composite enclave within the "balance."
  - In Michigan:
    - The city of Center Line is completely surrounded by Warren.
    - Highland Park and Hamtramck border each other, but the two together are completely surrounded by Detroit.
    - The city of Lathrup Village is completely surrounded by Southfield.
    - The city of Springfield is completely surrounded by Battle Creek.
  - In Minnesota:
    - The city of Centerville is completely surrounded by Lino Lakes.
    - The city of Hilltop is completely surrounded by Columbia Heights.
    - The city of Landfall is completely surrounded by Oakdale.
    - The city of Long Lake is completely surrounded by Orono.
    - The city of Loretto is completely surrounded by Medina.
    - The city of Medicine Lake is completely surrounded by Plymouth.
    - The city of Peterson is completely surrounded by Rushford Village.
    - The city of Rushford is completely surrounded by Rushford Village.
    - The city of St. Bonifacius is completely surrounded by Minnetrista.
    - The city of Willernie is completely surrounded by Mahtomedi.
  - In Missouri, the cities of Gladstone and North Kansas City are separately surrounded by Kansas City.
  - In Montana, when the governments of Butte and Silver Bow County merged in 1977, the town of Walkerville voted not to join the consolidated government, thus becoming an enclave.
  - In New Jersey:

County	Enclaved borough	Enclaved within	County	Enclaved borough	Enclaved within
Burlington	Fieldsboro	Bordentown Township	Monmouth	Freehold Borough	Freehold Township
Burlington	Medford Lakes	Medford Township	Morris	Morristown	Morris Township
Burlington	Pemberton	Pemberton Township	Morris	Chester Borough	Chester Township
Gloucester	Swedesboro	Woolwich Township	Ocean	Lakehurst	Manchester Township
Hunterdon	Flemington	Raritan Township	Ocean	Lavallette	Toms River Township
Hunterdon	Lebanon	Clinton Township	Ocean	Ocean Gate	Berkeley Township
Mercer	Hopewell	Hopewell Township	Ocean	Tuckerton	Little Egg Harbor Township
Mercer	Pennington	Hopewell Township	Salem	Woodstown	Pilesgrove Township
Mercer	Hightstown	East Windsor Township	Sussex	Branchville	Frankford Township
Middlesex	Jamesburg	Monroe Township	Sussex	Sussex	Wantage Township
Middlesex	Metuchen	Edison Township	Warren	Alpha	Pohatcong Township
Monmouth	Englishtown	Manalapan Township	Warren	Washington	Washington Township
Monmouth	Farmingdale	Howell Township	Warren	Washington	Washington Township

- In New York, the city of Cortland, New York, seat of Cortland County, is entirely surrounded by the town of Cortlandville, from which it is legally separate. Likewise, the city of Beacon is surrounded by the Town of Fishkill.
- In North Dakota, the city of Prairie Rose is an enclave of Fargo.
- In Ohio:
  - The cities of Brice, Bexley, and Whitehall are all enclaves of Columbus.
  - The city of Norwood is an enclave of Cincinnati. The cities of Elmwood Place, to the north, and St. Bernard, to the south, together form another enclave of Cincinnati.
  - In Stark County, the village of Hills & Dales is enclaved within Jackson Township.
  - In Summit County, the village of Lakemore is surrounded by Springfield Township.
- In Oregon, the city of Maywood Park is surrounded by Portland.
- In Pennsylvania, every county in the state other than the counties of Fulton, Philadelphia, Pike and Union contains at least one municipality in another municipality. There are at least 338 enclaves in the state comprising incorporated places and census-designated places within other county subdivisions. Usually, the enclave takes the form of a borough that is surrounded by the township of which it was originally a part, but other scenarios are possible (e.g., the Borough of Mount Oliver is an enclave of Pittsburgh; Pitcairn borough, of Monroeville; Dale borough, of Johnstown; and the Lackawanna County township of Elmhurst, of Roaring Brook Township). While Pennsylvania's urban counties contain few enclaves due to municipal fragmentation, rural areas feature numerous enclaved municipalities. Many resulted from small town centers separating from their rural surrounding areas.
- In Tennessee:
  - The cities of Red Bank and Ridgeside are enclaves in the city of Chattanooga.
  - The city of Berry Hill is an enclave of the city of Nashville.
  - The cities of Belle Meade, Forest Hills and Oak Hill together form an enclave of the city of Nashville.
  - Ooltewah is an enclave of Collegedale.
- In Texas:
  - The cities of Alamo Heights, Balcones Heights, Castle Hills, Hill Country Village, Hollywood Park, Kirby, Leon Valley, Olmos Park, Shavano Park, and Terrell Hills are all enclaves of San Antonio.
  - The cities of Bellaire, West University Place, and Southside Place together form an enclave of Houston. The cities of Bunker Hill Village, Hedwig Village, Hilshire Village, Hunters Creek Village, Piney Point Village, and Spring Valley Village together form another enclave of Houston.
  - The cities of Highland Park and University Park, collectively known locally as the "Park Cities", together form an enclave of Dallas. In addition, the city of Cockrell Hill is also an enclave of Dallas.
  - The city of Sunset Valley is enclave of Austin.
  - The cities of Blue Mound, Edgecliff Village, Haslet, Lake Worth, River Oaks, Saginaw, Sansom Park, Westover Hills, Westworth Village, and White Settlement are enclaves of Fort Worth
  - The cities of Dalworthington Gardens and Pantego together form an enclave of Arlington.
  - The city of Beverly Hills is an enclave of Waco.
- In Vermont:
  - The city of Rutland is an enclave of the town of Rutland.
  - The city of St. Albans is an enclave of the town of St. Albans.
- In Virginia, under Virginia law, all municipalities that are incorporated as cities are legally independent of any county. Fifteen such enclaves — thirteen individual cities, plus two pairs of adjoining cities — exist within the state; some of the cities that form these enclaves serve as county seat of the surrounding county:
  - Bedford, enclaved within and the county seat of Bedford County
  - Buena Vista, enclaved within Rockbridge County
  - Charlottesville, enclaved within and the county seat of Albemarle County
  - Covington, enclaved within and the county seat of Alleghany County
  - Emporia, enclaved within and the county seat of Greensville County
  - Fairfax, enclaved within and the county seat of Fairfax County. As noted above, the county courthouse is located in an unincorporated portion of Fairfax County that is completely surrounded by the city.
  - Harrisonburg, enclaved within and the county seat of Rockingham County
  - Lexington, enclaved within and the county seat of Rockbridge County
  - Manassas and Manassas Park together form an enclave within Prince William County. Manassas is the county seat; as noted above, the county courthouse is located in an unincorporated portion of Prince William County that is completely surrounded by the city.
  - Martinsville, enclaved within and the county seat of Henry County
  - Norton, enclaved within Wise County
  - Roanoke and Salem together form an enclave within Roanoke County. The Roanoke County Courthouse is located in Salem, but the rest of the county government is located in the unincorporated community of Cave Spring.
  - Staunton, enclaved within and the county seat of Augusta County
  - Waynesboro, enclaved within Augusta County
  - Winchester, enclaved within and the county seat of Frederick County
- In Wisconsin, the village of Thiensville is an enclave of the city of Mequon in Ozaukee County.

== Exclaves that are not enclaves ==
An exclave must always be grouped with a main region of which it is a legal part. In the case of international waters, the main region consists of all international waters not in EEZs. All potential paths of travel from the exclave to its main region must cross one or more different administrative-territorial regions having the equivalent legal level. Each exclave listed in this section borders on more than one other region.

=== National level ===
Name	Area (km^{2})	Exclave of	Coordinates	Notes
Nakhchivan Autonomous Republic	5,500	Azerbaijan	39°20′N 45°30′E	Bounded by Armenia, Iran, and Turkey
Strovilia (de facto)		Cyprus	35.095°N 33.900°E	Borders the British Sovereign Base Area (SBA) of Dhekelia and the de facto independent Turkish Republic of Northern Cyprus (TRNC), which is unrecognised internationally. The TRNC has occupied and controlled the exclave; on 30 June 2000 the TRNC unilaterally absorbed it, despite United Nations condemnation and lack of recognition.
Gulf of Fonseca outer tridominium	~190	Honduras	13°5′N 87°46′W	Honduras, El Salvador and Nicaragua border the Gulf of Fonseca, a closed sea under international law. Each enjoys a 3-nautical mile littoral zone of sovereignty along its shores and islands in the gulf. The remaining water area in the gulf comprises a tridominium that is shared in common among all three nations. The littoral zones (territorial waters) abut each other in a way that forms two separate areas of tridominium waters in the gulf. The outer area opens directly to the Pacific Ocean and is separated from the inner area by the territorial waters of Salvadoran and Nicaraguan islets. The inner area is bordered by the waters of all three countries. The larger outer area is bordered only by the waters of El Salvador and Nicaragua and the closing line of the gulf, such that one cannot travel within the gulf from Honduras to the outer area except by passing through El Salvadoran and Nicaraguan waters. Therefore, the outer water area is an exclave of Honduras that is shared territorially with two other countries. All three nations are "entitled outside the closing line to territorial sea, continental shelf and exclusive economic zone. Whether this situation should remain in being or be replaced by a division and delimitation into three separate zones is, as inside the Gulf also, a matter for the three States to decide."
Gaza Strip (de jure)	360	State of Palestine	31°25′N 34°20′E	Bounded by Israel, Egypt and the Mediterranean Sea, where the territorial sea and contiguous zone of Palestine are surrounded by those of Israel (the waters of Palestine and Egypt are separated by an Israeli corridor).
"Donut Hole", High Seas	~190,000	International waters	57°6′N 179°4′W	Surrounded by the EEZs of Russia and the United States (Alaska).
"Banana Hole", High Seas	~310,000	International waters	71°38′N 3°40′E	Surrounded by the EEZs of Norway (including Svalbard), Faeroe Islands, Greenland, Jan Mayen (Norway) and Iceland
"Eastern Gap", High Seas	~20,000	International waters	25°41′N 87°01′W	Surrounded by the EEZs of Mexico (EEZ defined by Cape Catoche and Scorpion Reef in the Gulf of Mexico), the United States (EEZ defined by Loggerhead Key and the Gulf coast) and Cuba (EEZ extends northwest from Cayo Ines de Soto)
High Seas		International waters	12°31′S 53°46′E	Surrounded by the EEZs of Mauritius (Agalega Islands), Tromelin Island (France), Madagascar and Seychelles (Farquhar Atoll)
High Seas		International waters	16°4′N 116°14′E	In the South China Sea, the EEZs that are defined by Taiwan (Pratas Reef), the Philippines (Luzon Island and Cabra I.), the Spratly Islands of Dao Dinh Ba and Flat Island, and the Paracel Island of Dao Hoang Sa enclose an exclave. National sovereignty over many of the Spratly and Paracel Islands in the South China Sea is disputed. Hence, depending upon the claims involved, this exclave may be considered as being created by the EEZs of Taiwan and the Philippines, or by the EEZs of Taiwan, the Philippines and Viet Nam, or by the EEZs of Taiwan and mainland China, or by the EEZ of mainland China alone.
High Seas	~100,000	International waters	14°7′S 158°35′W	Surrounded by the EEZs of French Polynesia, Cook Islands and Kiribati
High Seas	~77,000	International waters	15°16′S 173°0′E	Surrounded by the EEZs of Vanuatu, Solomon Islands and Fiji
High Seas	~380,000	International waters	2°43′N 142°53′E	Surrounded by the EEZs of Palau, Micronesia, Indonesia and Papua-New Guinea
High Seas	~1,400,000	International waters	15°26′N 133°0′E	Surrounded by the EEZs of Japan (outer islands, including Okino-tori-shima), Palau, the Philippines, Northern Marianas Islands and Micronesia
High Seas	~800,000	International waters	5°0′S 166°10′E	Surrounded by the EEZs of Nauru, Tuvalu, Micronesia, Northern Marianas Islands, Papua-New Guinea, Fiji, Kiribati and the Solomon Islands
"Western Gap", High Seas	17,467	International waters	25°39′N 92°46′W	Surrounded by the EEZs of Mexico (EEZ defined by Scorpion Reef and Cayo Arenas in the Gulf of Mexico) and the United States (EEZ defined by the Gulf of Mexico coast, including Wolf Island (south of Freeport, Texas, and Raccoon Island, Louisiana)) – This exclave no longer exists per se. In areas with natural resource deposits on the continental shelf, the UNCLOS allows nations to claim territory beyond the EEZ to a maximum of 350 NM. On 9 June 2000, the U.S. and Mexico divided the Western Gap by a line equidistant from both countries' coastlines. The new boundary divided the Western Gap, giving 38% of the area (6562 km^{2}) to the U.S. and 62% to Mexico (10,905 km^{2}).

=== First-order subnational level ===
Name	Area (km^{2})	Parent Country	Exclave of	Coordinates	Notes
Lienz District	2,016.41	Austria	Tyrol	46°54′06.2″N 12°32′47.2″E	The transfer of Trentino-Alto Adige/Südtirol to Italy after World War I left the county of Tyrol in two parts.
includes Birinci Dördyol and İkinci Dördyol	~17	Azerbaijan	Aghdam District	40°15′N 47°5.5′E	surrounded by Barda District and Tartar District
Zöhrabkənd	~4.0	Azerbaijan	Quba Rayon	40°58.9′N 48°51.3′E	Surrounded by Şabran Rayon and Siyəzən Rayon.
includes Yalavanc	~25	Azerbaijan	Quba Rayon	41°15′N 49°4.5′E	Surrounded by Şabran Rayon and Siyəzən Rayon.
north end of Tahtakorpu reservoir (including dam and power station)	~3.3	Azerbaijan	Quba Rayon	41°10′N 49°59.8′E	Surrounded by Şabran Rayon and Siyəzən Rayon.
south end of Tahtakorpu reservoir	~4.1	Azerbaijan	Quba Rayon	41°7.5′N 48°58.6′E	Surrounded by Şabran Rayon and Siyəzən Rayon.
includes the villages of Vladimirovka and Astraxanovka	~36	Azerbaijan	Oğuz Rayon	40°46′19″N 47°34′45″E	Surrounded by Şəki Rayon, Ağdaş Rayon and Qəbələ Rayon.
Voeren (Fourons)	50.63	Belgium	Flemish Region and Flemish Community (province of Limburg — Arrondissement of Tongeren)	50°44′53.4″N 5°48′19.8″E	
Comines-Warneton (Komen-Waasten)	61.09	Belgium	Wallonia and French Community (province of Hainaut — Arrondissement of Mouscron)	50°44′59.3″N 2°55′44.4″E	
• Belgian Eifel and • Land of Eupen	628.84 and 224.80	Belgium	German Speaking Community	50°20′25.7″N 6°11′58.7″E; 50°38′48.1″N 6°06′02.8″E	The two parts are separated by a part of the French Community.
Odžak	118	Bosnia and Herzegovina	Federation of Bosnia and Herzegovina (Posavina Canton)	45°04′07.0″N 18°19′35.5″E	Sandwiched between Republika Srpska and Croatia. The rest of Posavina Canton also borders Brčko District, which is a condominium of FBiH and Republika Srpska.
contains Xianghe County, Sanhe City, and Dachang Hui Autonomous County	1,277	China	Hebei province — (prefecture-level city of Langfang)	39°52′10.7″N 117°02′30.5″E	Lodged between the municipalities of Beijing and Tianjin.
contains Xylofagou		Cyprus	Larnaca District	34°58′44″N 33°51′1″E	
Gedeo Zone	1,352	Ethiopia	South Ethiopia Regional State	6°10′N 38°20′E	Between Sidama Region and Oromia Region. Part of Southern Nations, Nationalities, and Peoples' Region until the split of that region on 19 August 2023.
		Iceland	Ásahreppur	63°52′11.1″N 20°35′51.7″W	
(2 parcels)		Iceland	Kópavogur	64°00′49.2″N 21°42′39.0″W; 64°03′24.8″N 21°35′41.2″W	
Kitayama Village	48.21	Japan	Wakayama Prefecture	33°57′46.0″N 135°57′09.0″E	in the border between Mie and Nara prefectures
Kumanogawa Town	175.47	Japan	Wakayama Prefecture	33°53′34.9″N 135°52′42.9″E	in the border between Mie and Nara prefectures
	~60	Latvia	Olaine Municipality (Olaine parish)	56°42′13.1″N 24°07′59.3″E	
• Gapfahl and • Guschgfiel/Matta/Güschgle		Liechtenstein	Balzers	47°04′46.9″N 9°34′26.6″E; 47°08′32.1″N 9°36′46.3″E	
Rheinau–Tentscha		Liechtenstein	Eschen	47°11′32.4″N 9°29′34.3″E	
Nendler Berg		Liechtenstein	Gamprin	47°11′46.7″N 9°33′24.5″E	
• Riet, • Plankner Neugrütt (western part), and • Plankner Garselli		Liechtenstein	Planken	47°11′27.3″N 9°31′52.0″E; 47°11′10.2″N 9°33′25.6″E; 47°09′56.2″N 9°34′43.2″E	A fourth exclave is also an enclave (listed above)
• Plankner Neugrütt (eastern part), • Gritsch, and • Guschg		Liechtenstein	Schaan	47°11′10.2″N 9°33′37.2″E; 47°04′35.0″N 9°36′15.8″E; 47°07′29.5″N 9°35′50.4″E	A fourth exclave is also an enclave (listed above)
Turna und Sareis	~6.6	Liechtenstein	Triesenberg	47°05′48.5″N 9°37′19.4″E	
• Vaduzer Riet, • Dachsegg, • Hindervalorsch, and • Pradamee-Hahnenspiel		Liechtenstein	Vaduz	47°11′16.6″N 9°30′41.9″E; 47°11′20.5″N 9°33′17.2″E; 47°08′01.9″N 9°36′06.2″E; 47°05′57.7″N 9°35′52.9″E	An additional two exclaves are also enclaves (listed above)
Alexandru Ioan Cuza	~59	Moldova	Cahul District	45°37′26.6″N 28°29′12.9″E	
contains Tvardița and Valea Perjei	~170	Moldova	Taraclia District	46°06′28.5″N 28°56′37.3″E	
• Vulcănești, • Copceac and • Carbalia		Moldova	Gagauzia	45°37′32.4″N 28°23′16.4″E; 45°50′41.7″N 28°39′42.7″E; 45°52′48.7″N 28°26′43.5″E	
(comprising five communes)		Moldova	Criuleni District	47°03′48.0″N 29°08′31.7″E	
(2 parcels)		Moldova	Dubăsari District	47°09′19.0″N 29°09′28.6″E; 47°13′44.0″N 29°15′55.4″E	Separated by the Transnistrian controlled Dubăsari District. Transnistria is de facto independent, but not recognised by any member states of the United Nations.
Baganuur	620	Mongolia	Ulaanbaatar	47°47′N 108°22′E	Surrounded by Töv Province and Khentii Province
Viguí corregimiento	59.6	Panama	Veraguas Province (Las Palmas District)	8.3000°N 81.5000°W	Surrounded by Müna and Ñürüm districts of Ngöbe-Buglé Comarca, Tolé District of Chiriquí Province, and Cañazas District of Veraguas Province
Justo Fidel Palacios corregimiento	25.8	Panama	Chiriquí Province (Tolé District)	8°20′26.8″N 81°31′52.0″W	Bounded by Ngöbe-Buglé Comarca (Müna) and Veraguas Province (Las Palmas District)
Yablonovka	~20	Russia	Chuvashia (Shemurshinsky District – Chukalskoye rural settlement)	54°40′40.1″N 47°19′58.8″E	bordering on Tatarstan and Ulyanovsk Oblast
		Russia	Mordovia (Tengushevsky District – Shokshinskoye rural settlement)	54°52′N 42°27′E	bounded by Ryazan Oblast and Nizhny Novgorod Oblast
	~16	Russia	Ryazan Oblast (Yermishinsky District – Nadezhkinskoye rural settlement)	54°46′27″N 42°28′20″E	bounded by Mordovia and Nizhny Novgorod Oblast.
Rincón de Ademuz	370.22	Spain	Valencian Community (Province of Valencia)	40.0802°N 1.2854°W	between the provinces of Teruel in Aragon and Cuenca in Castile-La Mancha
Oberegg District (2 parcels)	14.67	Switzerland	Appenzell Innerrhoden	47°24′52.5″N 9°32′30.4″E; 47°25′37.3″N 9°34′59.4″E	bounded by Appenzell Ausserrhoden and St. Gallen
Engelberg	74.85	Switzerland	Obwalden	46°49′17.8″N 8°25′56.2″E	separated by Nidwalden and Bern
• Stein District and • part of Schaffhausen District	31.25 and 11.53	Switzerland	Canton of Schaffhausen	47°34′51.8″N 8°33′31.7″E; 47°41′33.0″N 8°49′44.9″E	The only canton lying mostly on the north bank of the Rhine, it is cut into three parts by German corridors to the Rhine. The middle part is the largest and embraces the German enclave of Büsingen. The upper and middle parts border on Thurgau, the middle and lower parts on Zürich.
• Kleinlützel, Thierstein District and • part of Dorneck District	16.34 and 25.69	Switzerland	Canton of Solothurn	47°25′34.2″N 7°25′02.5″E; 47°28′29.7″N 7°29′23.2″E	both bounded on the south by Basel-Landschaft and on the north by France
the former Avenches District	59.91	Switzerland	Vaud (Broye-Vully District)	46°55′21.6″N 7°01′36.7″E	separated by the Canton of Fribourg
Hatta	140	United Arab Emirates	Emirate of Dubai	24°47′53.9″N 56°08′47.6″E	
Masfout	86.59	United Arab Emirates	Emirate of Ajman	24°49′36.4″N 56°03′32.5″E	
Manama	25.73	United Arab Emirates	Emirate of Ajman	25°18′48.5″N 55°59′22.9″E	
the southerly of the emirate's two non-contiguous sections		United Arab Emirates	Ras al-Khaimah	25°02′48.8″N 56°04′44.2″E	
Kentucky Bend	69.6	United States	Kentucky (Fulton County)	36.529502°N 89.503555°W	Located inside a loop of the Mississippi River. The only road in the area goes south into Tennessee. This exclave exists because the Mississippi, which forms the boundary between Missouri (right bank) and Kentucky/Tennessee (left bank), crosses latitude 36°30', which defines part of the border between Kentucky and Tennessee, three times.

=== Other subnational ===
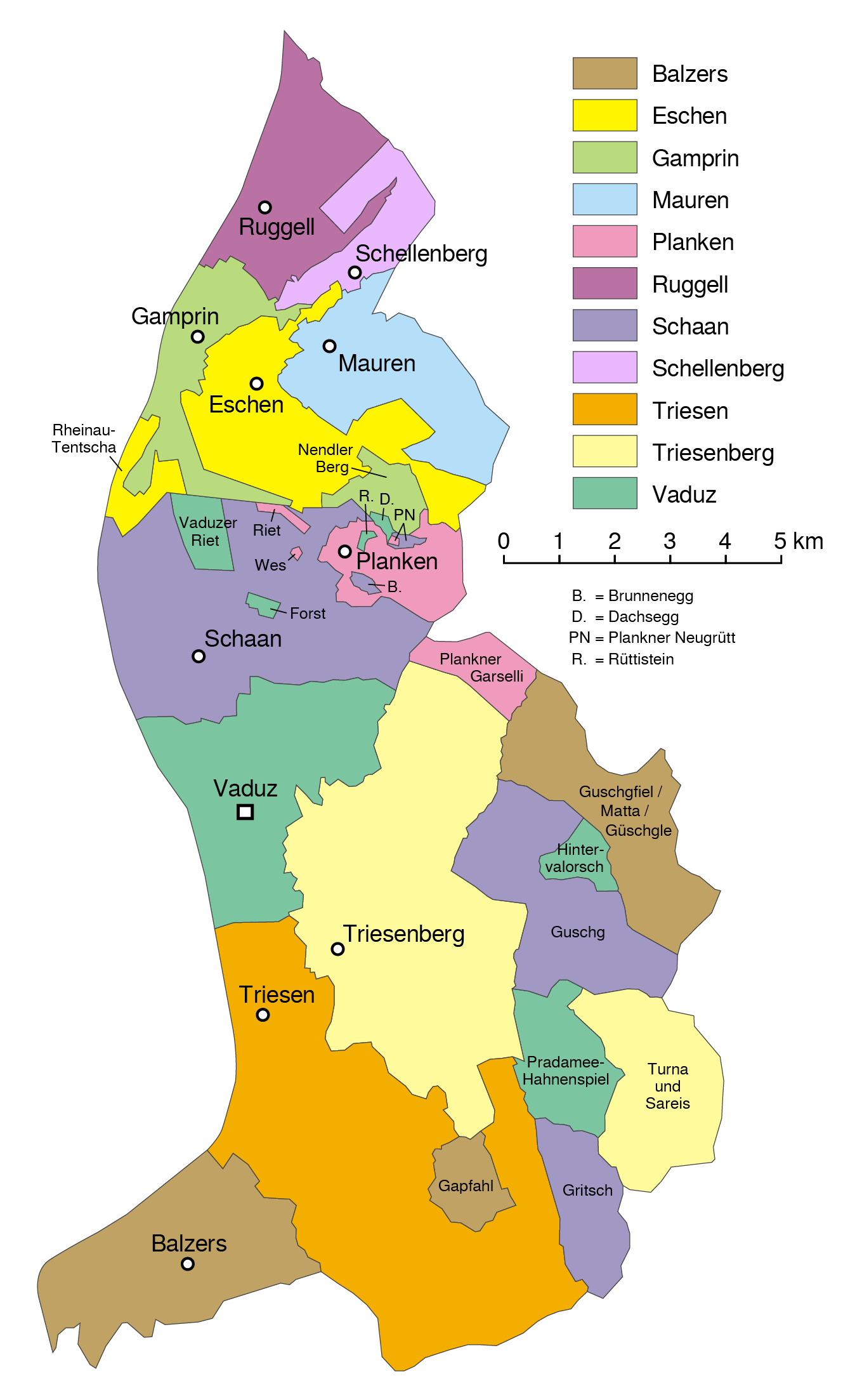
Administrative divisions of Liechtenstein

St. Martin Parish in the U.S. state of Louisiana, shown here, is divided into two non-contiguous areas separated by Iberia Parish.

- In Australia:
  - The state of Victoria's Murrindindi Shire has an exclave along the border with Shire of Yarra Ranges. It is separated from the rest of Murrindindi Shire by the Lake Mountain unincorporated area, which was originally a part of the shire.
  - The Aboriginal Shire of Woorabinda consists of five non-contiguous pieces; four are sub-parts of their four communities. Three are in the Central Highlands Region (previously excised from the Shire of Duaringa), and two are in the Rockhampton Region (previously excised from the Shire of Fitzroy), meaning the main settlement of Woorabinda itself has four exclaves.
- In Belgium:
  - Apart from Baarle-Hertog, there are three municipalities consisting of non-contiguous parts: Ixelles (Elsene) and Saint-Gilles (Sint-Gillis) in the Brussels Capital Region and Mesen in West Flanders.
- In Brazil:
  - In Goiás: Sítio d'Abadia was cut in two as a result of the expansion of Alvorada do Norte.
  - In Mato Grosso: Barra do Bugres was cut in two as a result of the expansion of Salto do Céu and Reserva do Cabaçal.
  - In Pará: the town of Senador José Porfírio was cut in two as a result of the formation of Anapu.
- In Canada:
  - The Caniapiscau Regional County Municipality in Quebec is separated into multiple sections including the exclaves of Lac-Vacher and Lac-Juillet surrounded by Labrador and Nunavik.
  - Greenstone, Ontario has a large principal section and two exclaved townsites, Nakina and Caramat.
- In China:
  - In Qinghai province, Tanggulashan town is an exclave of the city of Golmud and the Haixi Mongol and Tibetan Autonomous Prefecture that Golmud is part of, separated from the rest of the prefecture by a "panhandle" of Yushu Tibetan Autonomous Prefecture.
- In Croatia:
  - In Koprivnica-Križevci County, the municipality of Legrad is split in two, separated by the municipality of Đelekovec.
  - In Osijek-Baranja County:
    - The villages of Palača and Silaš form an exclave of the municipality of Šodolovci. The main road between the two portions goes through Vukovar-Srijem County.
    - The village of Široko Polje belongs to the city of Đakovo from which it is separated by the municipalities of Gorjani and Viškovci.
- In Estonia:
  - In Harju County, Harku small borough is an exclave of Harku Parish.
  - In Ida-Viru County, the town of Kohtla-Järve is divided into five separated districts. Of these exclaves, Ahtme, Järve and Sompa districts are not enclaves.
  - In Tartu County, Piirissaar island in Lake Peipus is an exclave of Tartu Parish, which otherwise doesn't have a coastline at the lake.
  - In Võru County, sixteen villages form an exclave of Setomaa Parish.
- In Finland:
  - In Ostrobothnia, the former municipality of Vähäkyrö is now an exclave of the city of Vaasa.
  - In Kymenlaakso, the municipality of Iitti has a small exclave called Supinkulma, which is surrounded by Lahti and Heinola, both located in Päijät-Häme.
- In France:
  - The commune of Ménessaire is an exclave of the department of Côte-d'Or between Nièvre and Saône-et-Loire.
- In Germany:
  - The Samtgemeinde Baddeckenstedt is separated from the greater part of the district Wolfenbüttel by the urban district of Salzgitter.
- In Greece:
  - Part of the municipal unit of Kallithea is an exclave of the municipality of Oraiokastro surrounded by the municipalities of Delta and Chalkidona.
  - The settlements of Saronida and Vlachaiika are an exclave of the municipality of Troizinia-Methana surrounded by the municipalites of Poros and Ermionida.
- In India:
  - In Madhya Pradesh in central India, Datia district has an exclave surrounded by Shivpuri district of Madhya Pradesh and Jhansi district of Uttar Pradesh.
  - The districts of Kapurthala (in Punjab state), Tumakuru (in Karnataka state), and Imphal East in Manipur state each has an exclave.
- In Indonesia:
  - In North Sumatra, three subdistricts of Nias Regency, namely Botumuzoi, Hiliduho and Hili Serangkai, are separated from the rest of the regency by the city of Gunungsitoli and West Nias Regency.
  - In South Sumatra, six subdistricts of Muara Enim Regency, namely Muara Belida, Gelumbang, Sungai Rotan, Kelekar, Lembak, and Belida Darat, are separated from the rest of the regency by the city of Prabumulih and the Penukal Abab Lematang Ilir Regency (both are split from Muara Enim).
  - In Central Java, the subdistrict of Colomadu is cut from other parts of the Karanganyar Regency by land that belongs to the regencies and cities of Boyolali, Surakarta, and Sukoharjo.
- In Italy:
  - In Abruzzo:
    - In the Province of L'Aquila: the municipality of L'Aquila has an exclave between the municipalities of Lucoli, Rocca di Mezzo, Magliano de' Marsi and the region of Lazio; Carapelle Calvisio and Castelvecchio Calvisio have two adjoining exclaves between Santo Stefano di Sessanio, Calascio and the Province of Teramo; Ofena consists of two parts separated by Castel del Monte and Villa Santa Lucia degli Abruzzi; Sulmona has an exclave between Pratola Peligna and Prezza; Cerchio has an exclave between Aielli, Collarmele and Celano; Celano consists of two non-contiguous parts separated by Aielli and Ovindoli.
    - In the Province of Chieti: Atessa has an exclave separated from the rest of the municipality by Tornareccio and is bordering six other municipalities; San Buono has an exclave between Furci and Fresagrandinaria.
  - In Apulia:
    - In the Metropolitan City of Bari: Castellana Grotte has an exclave between Alberobello and Monopoli; Monopoli has an exclave between Castellana Grotte and Alberobello; Acquaviva delle Fonti has an exclave between Gioia del Colle and Santeramo in Colle; Putignano has an exclave between Gioia del Colle and Turi; Binetto has an exclave between Toritto, Palo del Colle and Bitonto.
    - In the Province of Foggia: San Marco in Lamis has three exclaves between Foggia and San Giovanni Rotondo and one between Foggia, San Giovanni Rotondo and Manfredonia; San Severo has an exclave between Foggia, San Marco in Lamis and Rignano Garganico; Manfredonia has an exclave between Foggia and Carapelle; Poggio Imperiale has two non-contiguous parts separated by Lesina; Castelnuovo della Daunia has an exclave between Torremaggiore and Casalvecchio di Puglia and another one between Torremaggiore, Casalvecchio di Puglia, Casalnuovo Monterotaro and Santa Croce di Magliano in the region of Molise.
    - In the Province of Lecce: Leverano has an exclave between Arnesano and Copertino; Squinzano has an exclave between Lecce and Torchiarolo in the Province of Brindisi.
  - In Basilicata:
    - In the Province of Matera: Tricarico has an exclave between Grottole and Grassano.
    - In the Province of Potenza: Fardella has four exclaves; Chiaromonte has three; Atella and Noepoli have two each; Tito has one.
  - In Calabria:
    - In the Province of Catanzaro: Feroleto Antico has an exclave between Pianopoli and Serrastretta; Fossato Serralta has an exclave between Cicala, Gimigliano and Sorbo San Basile.
    - In the Province of Cosenza: Bianchi has an exclave between Panettieri and the Province of Catanzaro; Oriolo has an exclave between Albidona, Alessandria del Carretto and Castroregio; Castroregio has an exclave between Oriolo, Alessandria del Carretto and the Province of Potenza; Cerchiara di Calabria has an exclave between San Lorenzo Bellizzi, Castrovillari and the Province of Potenza; Mormanno has an exclave between Laino Castello and Papasidero; Mongrassano has an exclave between Cervicati, San Marco Argentano, Cerzeto and Bisignano; Cervicati has an exclave between Mongrassano and San Marco Argentano; Acquappesa has an exclave between Mongrassano, Fagnano Castello, Cetraro and Guardia Piemontese.
    - In the Metropolitan City of Reggio Calabria: the seat of the municipality of Roghudi is an enclave within Melito di Porto Salvo and the other, larger part of the municipality is about 40 km away and is an exclave surrounded by 6 other municipalities. Similarly, the seat of the municipality of Africo is a semi-exclave in Bianco with the larger part being an exclave between 7 other municipalities.
  - In Emilia-Romagna:
    - In the Metropolitan City of Bologna: Castello d'Argile has an exclave between Sala Bolognese and Argelato.
    - In the Province of Forlì-Cesena: Sarsina consists of three non-contiguous parts, the larger two separated by Bagno di Romagna and Mercato Saraceno and the smallest one separated by Verghereto.
    - In the Province of Modena: Modena has two exclaves between Carpi and Soliera.
    - In the Province of Rimini: Verucchio has an exclave between San Leo and the Republic of San Marino.
  - In Friuli-Venezia Giulia: Dogna has an exclave between Moggio Udinese and Pontebba; Tramonti di Sopra has an exclave between Meduno and Tramonti di Sotto.
  - In Lazio, the Province of Viterbo (the municipality of Gallese) has an exclave between Umbria and the Province of Rieti.
    - In the Province of Rieti: Rieti has an exclave between Colli sul Velino, Contigliano, Greccio and the Province of Terni; Concerviano has an exclave between Rieti and Longone Sabino; Longone Sabino consists of two non-contiguous parts separated by southern part of Concerviano; Rocca Sinibalda consists of two non-contiguous parts separated by southern exclave of Longone Sabino and northern exclave of Ascrea; Ascrea consists of three non-contiguous parts separated by Castel di Tora (north and south part) and Paganico Sabino (south and east).
    - In the Metropolitan City of Rome Capital: Polline Martignano is an exclave of Rome between Anguillara Sabazia, Campagnano di Roma and Trevignano Romano; Monte Compatri consists of three non-contiguous parts; Grottaferrata has an exclave between Marino, Rocca di Papa and Castel Gandolfo; Artena has an exclave between Lariano, Velletri and the Province of Latina; Rocca Priora has an exclave between Artena, Lariano and Rocca di Papa.
    - In the Province of Viterbo: Viterbo has an exclave between Ronciglione and Vetralla; Vejano has an exclave between Blera and the Metropolitan City of Rome Capital.
  - In Lombardy: Comune di San Colombano (named after the Irish missionary Saint Columbanus) is an exclave of the Metropolitan City of Milan between the provinces of Lodi and Pavia
    - In the Province of Pavia: Cornale e Bastida has an exclave between Sannazzaro de' Burgondi, Corana and an exclave of Silvano Pietra; Silvano Pietra has an exclave between Sannazzaro de' Burgondi, Corana and an exclave of Cornale e Bastida; Casei Gerola has three exclaves (between Mezzana Bigli, Cornale e Bastida, Silvano Pietra and the region of Piedmont); Pancarana has an exclave between Mezzana Rabattone, Zinasco and Bastida Pancarana; Santa Maria della Versa has an exclave between Golferenzo and Montecalvo Versiggia.
  - In Marche:
    - In the Province of Ascoli Piceno: Ascoli Piceno has an exclave (Piana della Forcella) between Acquasanta Terme, Roccafluvione and Forcella (an exclave of Roccafluvione), itself between Acquasanta Terme and Piana della Forcella (Ascoli Piceno).
    - In the Province of Fermo: Fermo has one exclave between Francavilla d'Ete, Montegiorgio, Massa Fermana and the Province of Macerata, and another one between Montegiorgio, Grottazzolina and Magliano di Tenna.
    - In the Province of Pesaro and Urbino: Sassofeltrio has an exclave between Monte Grimano Terme and the Republic of San Marino.
  - In Molise:
    - In the Province of Campobasso: Campobasso has an exclave between Oratino, Castropignano and Ripalimosani; Montenero di Bisaccia has an exclave between San Felice del Molise and Tavenna, and another one between Mafalda and Tavenna.
  - In Piedmont:
    - In the Province of Asti: Camerano Casasco has two exclaves between Chiusano d'Asti and Montechiaro d'Asti; Pino d'Asti has one between Castelnuovo Don Bosco and Passerano Marmorito; Monastero Bormida has an exclave between Roccaverano, Bubbio and Loazzolo.
    - In the Province of Biella: Callabiana, Pettinengo, Tavigliano, Valdilana, Bioglio, Veglio, Vallanzengo, Valle San Nicolao, Caprile and Ailoche have mountain exclaves in the northern part of the province, between the Province of Vercelli and the region of Aosta Valley; Valle San Nicolao has another exclave between Pettinengo, Bioglio and Valdilana; Muzzano has an exclave between Graglia and Sordevolo; Andorno Micca and Sagliano Micca have adjoining exclaves between Piedicavallo, Rosazza, Campiglia Cervo, Biella and the region of Aosta Valley; Pollone has an exclave between Biella, Sordevolo and the region of Aosta Valley; Magnano has an exclave between Zimone and the Metropolitan City of Turin.
    - In the Metropolitan City of Turin: Carignano has an exclave between Castagnole Piemonte and Osasio; Carmagnola has an exclave between Carignano and Lombriasco; Claviere consists of two exclaves between Cesana Torinese and France; Traversella has an exclave between Quincinetto and Aosta Valley region; Brosso has an exclave between Traversella and Valchiusa; Castelnuovo Nigra has two exclaves between Cintano and Colleretto Castelnuovo; Castellamonte, Valchiusa, Vistrorio and Val di Chy have exclaves, some bordering each other, between Traversella, Castelnuovo Nigra, Rueglio and Lessolo. Castellamonte has another one between San Martino Canavese, Torre Canavese, Quagliuzzo and Parella; Vistrorio has two more between Issiglio and Rueglio; Prascorsano has one between Canischio and Pratiglione; Rivara has one between Pratiglione and Forno Canavese; and Pertusio has one between Valperga and Prascorsano (connected at a quadripoint).
    - In the Province of Vercelli: Cigliano has an exclave between Moncrivello and the Metropolitan City of Turin.
  - In Sardinia:
    - In the Metropolitan City of Cagliari: Assemini consists of two non-contiguous parts of approximately same sizes separated by Uta; Decimomannu also has two non-contiguous parts separated by Uta; Quartucciu has two non-contiguous parts separated by Maracalagonis and Quartu Sant'Elena.
    - In the Province of Nuoro: Triei has an exclave between Urzulei, Talana and Baunei; Arzana has an exclave (Acetorri) between Contissa (exclave of Jerzu), Quirra (exclave of Lanusei) and the Province of South Sardinia; Loceri has an exclave (Bacu Orca) between Sa Tuvada (exclave of Osini), Quirra (exclave of Lanusei) and Tertenia; Osini consists of four non-contiguous exclaves; Lanusei has an exclave (Quirra) between Sa Tuvuda (exclave of Osini), Acetorri (exclave of Arzana) and Bacu Orca (exclave of Loceri); Jerzu has an exclave (Contissa) between Ulassai, Acetorri (exclave of Arzana), Sa Tuvuda (exclave of Osini) and the Province of South Sardinia; Elini has an exclave between Ilbono, Arzana and Lanusei; Gairo has an exclave (Su Sirboni) between Tertenia and Cardedu.
    - In the Province of Sassari: Cheremule has an exclave between Giave and Thiesi; Tempio Pausania has an exclave between Palau, Santa Teresa Gallura, Aglientu, Luogosanto and Arzachena.
    - In the Province of South Sardinia: Iglesias has an exclave separated by Domusnovas; Gonnosfanadiga has an exclave between Guspini and Arbus.
  - In Sicily:
    - In the Province of Caltanissetta: Mazzarino consists of three non-contiguous parts, all three separated by Riesi.
    - In the Metropolitan City of Catania: Motta Sant'Anastasia has an exclave between Catania and Belpasso; Tremestieri Etneo has an exclave between Catania, Sant'Agata li Battiati, San Giovanni la Punta and San Gregorio di Catania.
    - In the Province of Enna: Piazza Armerina has an exclave between five municipalities; Assoro has three exclaves between various other municipalities.
    - In the Metropolitan City of Palermo: Bisacquino has an exclave between Monreale, Contessa Entellina and Roccamena.
    - In the Province of Trapani: Gibellina has an exclave (Nuova Gibellina) surrounded by Santa Ninfa except for a quadripoint with Salemi, and Santa Ninfa has an exclave between Nuova Gibellina and Salemi.
  - In Trentino-Alto Adige/Südtirol:
    - In the Autonomous Province of Trentino: Canal San Bovo, Carisolo, Cimego, Cinte Tesino, Comano Terme, Giustino, Imèr, Malosco, Massimeno, Pellizzano, Pergine Valsugana, Pieve Tesino, Ronzone, Spiazzo, Stenico, Tione di Trento, Tre Ville consist of two or three non-contiguous parts separated by other municipalities
  - In Tuscany:
    - In the Province of Arezzo: Poppi has one exclave between Bibbiena, Chiusi della Verna and the region of Emilia-Romagna, and another one between Bibbiena, Ortignano Raggiolo and Castel Focognano.
    - In the Province of Lucca: Gallicano has an exclave between Barga, Fosciandora, Castelnuovo di Garfagnana and Molazzana.
- In Japan:
  - In Kanagawa Prefecture
    - The city of Kawasaki has an exclave surrounded by Yokohama and Machida, Tokyo. The exclave is part of Asao ward.
  - In Kyoto
    - The city of Kumiyama has an exclave surrounded by Uji, Ujitawara and Jōyō. The exclave contains the Kyoto Prefectural Sports Square.
    - The city of Yawata has four exclaves. 3 of these are surrounded by Kumiyama and Fushimi Ward, Kyoto City. The fourth is surrounded by Kyōtanabe and Hirakata, Osaka
- In South Korea, Dasa region is an exclave of Dalseong County, Daegu and Iseo-myeon is an exclave of Wanju, North Jeolla Province.
- In Mexico, Torreón Municipality in the state of Coahuila consists of two segments, both touching the neighboring state of Durango.
- In the Netherlands, Amsterdam Zuidoost is cut from other parts of the municipality of Amsterdam by land that belongs to the municipalities of Ouder-Amstel and Diemen.
- In the Philippines:
  - Caloocan is divided in two by Quezon City.
  - In Cotabato province, the municipality of President Roxas is divided in two by Antipas municipality.
  - In Nueva Ecija, the municipality of Talavera is divided in two by Santo Domingo.
- In Poland:
  - The main portion of the municipality of Fabianki, which belongs to the Włocławek County, Kuyavian–Pomeranian Voivodeship, is separated from the rest of the county by the city-county of Włocławek.
  - The municipality of Igołomia-Wawrzeńczyce, which belongs to Kraków County, is separated from the rest of the county by Proszowice County and the city-county of Kraków.
  - Sławków is an exclave of Będzin County. Sławków is separated from the rest of the county by the cities of Dąbrowa Górnicza and Sosnowiec. All of these are within the Silesian Voivodeship.
  - Rybnik County is split into three disjoint parts, separated by the city of Rybnik. The three parts are the municipalities of Czerwionka-Leszczyny, Świerklany, and the combined area of Lyski, Gaszowice and Jejkowice. All of these are within the Silesian Voivodeship.
  - The city-county of Żory, Silesian Voivodeship, has a small exclave located between the city-county of Rybnik, Silesian Voivodeship, and the municipality of Świerklany in Rybnik County, Silesian Voivodeship. The exclave has an area of c. 13.5 ha and lies around 50 m from the rest of the city.
- In Portugal, as a consequence of administrative reforms during the 19th century (in the 1830s, then again in the 1850s, and to a much lesser extent in the 1890s), as well as more recent legislation forbidding the creation of territorial discontinuities, there are almost no subnational exclaves or enclaves, and the few that persist are on the municipal or civil parish level:
  - Municipalities with exclave civil parishes (at least one civil parish is separated from the main body): Montijo and Oliveira de Frades.
  - Municipalities with sub-civil parish level exclaves (at least one civil parish is itself territorially discontinuous, creating an exclave also at the municipal level): Soure.
  - Exclaves that are sub-parts of civil parishes and that yet remain within the municipal-level boundary are located in the following municipalities: Ansião, Belmonte, Coimbra, Oliveira de Frades, Penela.
- In Russia, Khabarovsky District in Khabarovsk Krai is separated into two parts by Amursky District
- In Spain, the following provincial level exclaves that are not enclaves exist. Many other exclaves exist at municipal level.
  - Anchuras is an exclave of the province of Ciudad Real between the provinces of Toledo and Badajoz.
  - Berzosilla is an exclave of the province of Palencia between Cantabria and the province of Burgos.
  - Orduña is an exclave of Biscay between the Álava and the province of Burgos.
  - Roales de Campos and Quintanilla del Molar constitute an exclave of the province of Valladolid between the provinces of León and Zamora.
  - In Comarca de Guadix, the Aldeire municipality has an exclave to the north called "Cortijo Ramos", surrounded by the Valle del Zalabi and La Calahorra municipalities.

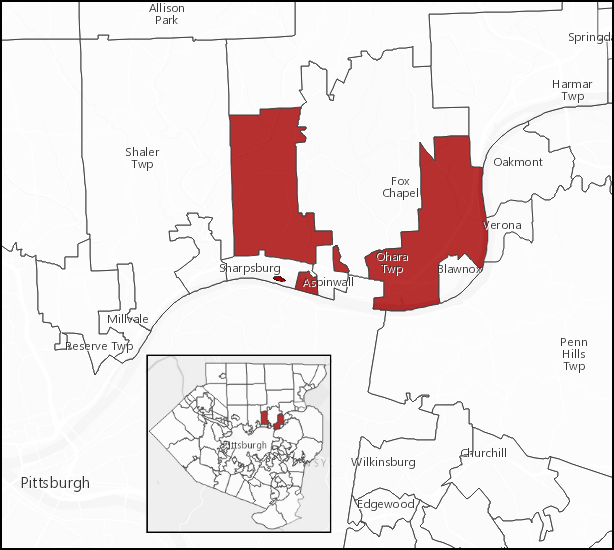
O'Hara Township, Pennsylvania is divided into five non-contiguous areas.

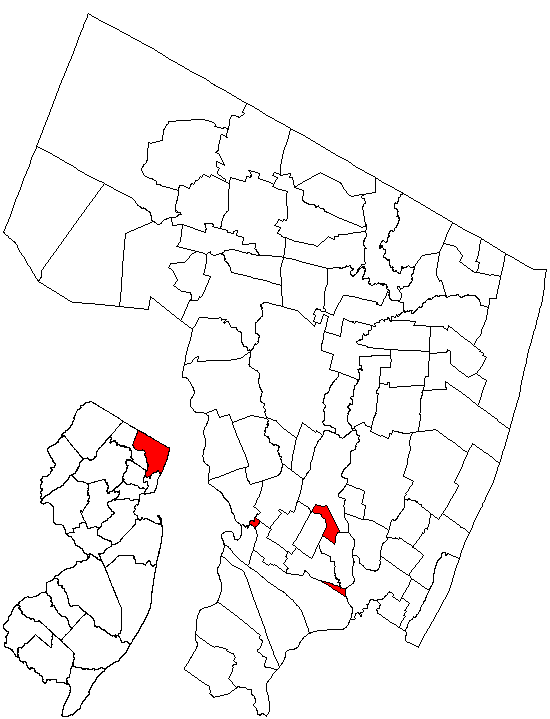
South Hackensack, New Jersey is divided into three non-contiguous areas.

Brownstown Charter Township, Michigan is divided into three non-contiguous areas.

- In the United States of America:
  - In Alaska, the Unorganized Borough is separated into multiple sections; however, the only true exclave that is not an enclave is the town of Hyder, which belongs to Prince of Wales – Hyder Census Area.
  - In Georgia, Brooks County has a small portion separated by Lowndes County and Madison County, Florida.
  - In Louisiana, a portion of St. Martin Parish is separated by Iberia Parish. A portion of West Feliciana Parish is separated by Concordia Parish. A portion of Madison Parish is separated by Warren County, Mississippi.
  - In Massachusetts, Norfolk County has two exclaves: Brookline between Middlesex and Suffolk counties, and Cohasset on the coast of Plymouth County.
  - In Michigan:
    - In Houghton County: The city of Houghton divides Portage and Adams townships into two sections apiece, and the city of Hancock divides Quincy Township in two as well.
    - Brownstown Township, Wayne County is separated into three parts. The two smaller parts are separated from the main portion of the township by Woodhaven. Both smaller parts are further separated by Rockwood and Gibraltar.
  - In New Jersey:
    - In Atlantic County, Egg Harbor Township is split into three parts.
    - In Bergen County, the township of South Hackensack is divided into three separate parts as a result of other municipalities withdrawing from it.
    - In Burlington County, the borough of Wrightstown has two sections.
    - In Camden County, Haddon Township is split into three parts, of which two are joined at a quadripoint.
    - In Monmouth County, Aberdeen Township is divided into two pieces.
    - In Morris County, the township of Randolph has a tiny exclave, and Rockaway Township has a small portion that is joined by only a quadripoint.
  - In New Mexico, Sandoval County has an exclave. During World War II, Los Alamos County was created out of parts of Sandoval and Santa Fe Counties, for the convenience of the Manhattan Project. That portion of Sandoval County that is within the San Ildefonso Indian Reservation, about 3 km^{2}, became an exclave bounded by Los Alamos County on the southwest, Santa Fe County on the east and Rio Arriba County on the north.
  - In New York: In Westchester County, Rye Town has an exclave separated by Harrison and Rye City.
  - In Pennsylvania:
    - In Allegheny County, O'Hara Township consists of five non-contiguous areas, with Sharpsburg, Aspinwall and Fox Chapel separating them. One area (Sixmile Island) is enclaved within Sharpsburg.
    - In Berks County, in addition to the two exclaves of Cumru Township mentioned above, Lower Alsace Township has an exclave separated from the rest of the township by the borough of Mount Penn.
    - In Chester County, Schuylkill Township has a small exclave separated by Phoenixville. In addition, Valley Township has an exclave created by a narrow strip of land that is part of Coatesville.
    - Three municipalities in Delaware County have exclaves. Springfield Township has an exclave separated from the main body of the township by the village of Swarthmore; Darby Township consists of two non-contiguous areas; and part of Upper Darby is separated from the main body of the township by Aldan and Lansdowne.
    - In Lackawanna County, South Abington Township has an exclave along Glenburn Road bordered by Clarks Summit borough and Waverly Township. The township itself is oddly shaped and borders the collective area of Clarks Summit, Clarks Green, and Waverly Township on three sides.
    - There are four sets of exclaves in Schuylkill County. Norwegian Township has a small exclave separated by the city of Pottsville, and West Mahanoy Township is split into two sections, separated by the borough of Gilberton. In addition, the borough of Auburn creates exclaves of both South Manheim Township and West Brunswick Township.
    - In York County, Spring Garden Township has an exclave separated from the rest of the township by the city of York.
  - In South Carolina, Pickens County has two exclaves separated by Oconee County and Anderson County.
  - In Tennessee:
    - White County has a small portion separated by Cumberland County and Van Buren County.
    - Tipton County has a small portion separated by Shelby County and Mississippi County, Arkansas.
  - The lands within numerous Indian reservations have been fragmented, with privately owned real estate intermixed with tribal, city, county, state, and federal authorities in a bewildering array of jurisdictional geographies.
    - Red Lake Indian Reservation has one large exclave bordering Canada (itself containing enclaves of non-reservation land) and numerous other small exclaves.
    - Rosebud Indian Reservation also has numerous small exclaves.

== Semi-enclaves and semi-exclaves ==
Semi-enclaves and semi-exclaves are areas that, except for possessing an unsurrounded sea border, would otherwise be enclaves or exclaves. Semi-enclaves can exist as independent states that border only one other state. Vinokurov (2007) declares, "Technically, Portugal, Denmark, and Canada also border only one foreign state, but they are not enclosed in the geographical, political, or economic sense. They have vast access to international waters. At the same time, there are states that, although in possession of sea access, are still enclosed by the territories of a foreign state." (At the time of publication, Canada and Denmark did not share a border. Portugal is not considered a semi-enclave.) Therefore, Vinokurov applies a quantitative principle: the land boundary must be longer than the coastline. Thus he classifies a state as a sovereign semi-enclave if it borders on just one state, and its land boundary is longer than its sea coastline. Vinokurov affirms that "no similar quantitative criterion is needed to define the scope of non-sovereign semi-enclaves/exclaves."

=== Semi-enclaves that are not semi-exclaves ===
==== National level ====
- Brunei: Surrounded by Malaysia and the South China Sea
- Gambia: Surrounded by Senegal and the Atlantic Ocean
- Monaco: Surrounded by France and the Mediterranean Sea

==== Subnational level ====
- In Canada: In Newfoundland and Labrador, the town of Petty Harbour–Maddox Cove is a semi-enclave in the city of St. John's.
- In Japan: The village of Hiezu, Tottori is surrounded by the city of Yonago and Miho Bay (Sea of Japan).
- In the United Kingdom: In Scotland, Aberdeen City is a semi-enclave surrounded by the council area of Aberdeenshire on land and by the North Sea.
- In the United States of America: In California, the city of Santa Monica borders the Pacific Ocean on one side and is otherwise completely surrounded by the city of Los Angeles.

=== Semi-enclaves that are also semi-exclaves ===
==== National level ====
- Brunei: Temburong District is bounded by Malaysia and Brunei Bay. The Temburong Bridge connects Temburong to the Brunei mainland, bypassing the need to traverse through Malaysian territory.
- Cyprus (de facto): The de facto independent Turkish Republic of Northern Cyprus (TRNC), which is unrecognised internationally, has a semi-enclave in the island's Northwest, Kokkina/Erenköy, which is bounded by the U.N. buffer zone and the Mediterranean Sea.
- East Timor: Oecusse is bounded by Indonesia and the Savu Sea.
- Eritrea: The southeasternmost point of Eritrea (12°42′38.3″N 43°7′52.9″E) is surrounded by Djibouti and Bab-el-Mandeb.
- Oman: Musandam is bounded by the United Arab Emirates and the Strait of Hormuz.
- Spain: Ceuta, Melilla, and Peñón de Vélez de la Gomera are bounded by the Mediterranean Sea and by either a neutral zone or Morocco itself.
- United Kingdom:
  - The overseas territory of Gibraltar is on the south coast of Spain. A neutral zone had existed at one time but appears no longer to be observed.
  - Akrotiri and Dhekelia – British Overseas Territory on the island of Cyprus, administered as two Sovereign Base Areas, an Eastern Sovereign Base Area (ESBA) and a Western Sovereign Base Area (WSBA). The bases were retained by the UK following the independence of Cyprus in 1960. The Western Sovereign Base Area includes Akrotiri and Episkopi Cantonment, while the Eastern Sovereign Base Area includes Dhekelia Cantonment and Ayios Nikolaos.
- United States of America: Alaska is bounded by Canada, the Arctic Ocean, the Bering Sea and the Pacific Ocean. Alaska is the world's largest semi-enclave.

=== Other subnational ===
- Poland: Międzyodrze-Wyspa Pucka, a neighborhood of Szczecin, while mostly consisting of islands on the Oder river, possesses several thin strips of land on the west bank of the river, as well as in the northern portion of Ustowskie Mokradła islands.

=== Semi-exclaves that are not semi-enclaves ===
==== National level ====
- Angola: Cabinda is bounded by the Democratic Republic of the Congo, the Republic of the Congo and the Atlantic Ocean.
- Croatia: The southern portion of Dubrovnik-Neretva County, including the historic city of Dubrovnik, is bounded by Bosnia and Herzegovina, Montenegro, and the Adriatic Sea. Neum, Bosnia and Herzegovina's only sea access, is sandwiched between the two portions of this county. This semi-exclave relies on national territorial waters as its only alternative connection to the rest of the country. It is accessible to Croatia's much larger region to the north by an 8 km road a short distance from and parallel to the Adriatic coastline, crossing Bosnia via Neum. The Pelješac Bridge, which opened July 2022, is a 2.3 km bridge to a Croatian peninsula that bypasses the Bosnian transit.
- Cyprus (de facto): The Greek Cypriot-controlled portion of Famagusta District, along with the easternmost exclave of Larnaca District, together are a semi-exclave, bounded by the U.N. buffer zone, Dhekelia Sovereign Base Area and the Mediterranean Sea.
- France: French Guiana (an Overseas Department), in South America, is bounded by Suriname, Brazil and the Atlantic Ocean.
- Russia: Kaliningrad Oblast is bounded by Lithuania, Poland and the Baltic Sea.

== Pene-enclaves/exclaves (including inaccessible districts) ==
A pene-exclave is a part of the territory of one country that can be approached conveniently — in particular by wheeled traffic — only through the territory of another country. Such areas are enclaves or exclaves for practical purposes, without meeting the strict definition; hence they are also called functional enclaves or practical enclaves. Many pene-exclaves partially border their own territorial waters (i.e., they are not surrounded by other nations' territorial waters). A pene-enclave can also exist entirely on land, such as when intervening mountains render a territory inaccessible from other parts of a country except through alien territory. Thus, a pene-exclave has land borders with other territory but is not completely surrounded by the other's land or territorial waters. They can exhibit continuity of state territory across territorial waters but, nevertheless, a discontinuity on land, such as in the case of Point Roberts. Along rivers that change course, pene-enclaves can be observed as complexes comprising many small pene-enclaves. Attribution of a pene-enclave status to a territory can sometimes be disputed, depending on whether the territory is considered to be practically inaccessible from the mainland or not.

=== National level ===
- Austria:
  - The municipality of Jungholz is connected to the rest of Austria at a quadripoint at the summit of the mountain Sorgschrofen (1636 m). Road access is only via German land. However, Vinokurov (2007) states, "For all purposes, a connection in a single point does not mean anything. It is just like being completely separated. One cannot pass through a single point, nor is it possible to transport goods. It is not even possible to lay a telephone line." (See above: Enclaves that are also exclaves.)
  - The Kleinwalsertal, a valley part of Vorarlberg, can only be reached by road from Oberstdorf, Germany.
  - Hinterriß and Eng (parts of the communes of Vomp and Eben am Achensee in Tyrol, Austria) are functional exclaves accessible by road only from Germany.
- Belgium/France: Along the river Leie (Lys in French) between Halluin and Armentières, where the river forms the border, there are 7 small pene-exclaves of Belgium (province of Hainaut) on the southern side of the river and 7 small pene-exclaves of France (department of Nord) on the northern side of the river. This is due to minor changes in the course of the river since the border was fixed in 1830.
- Belgium/Luxembourg: An Aldi supermarket located at Schmëtt, at the northernmost point of Luxembourg, is only accessible by road from Luxembourg by briefly driving into Belgium.
- Belgium/Netherlands: On the Dutch side of the Meuse River, between the Belgian municipality of Visé and its neighbouring Dutch municipalities of Maastricht and Eijsden-Margraten, Belgium has two pene-exclaves, Presqu'ile de L'Ilal and Presqu'ile d'Eijsden. A Dutch pene-exclave, Presqu'ile Petit-Gravier, lies on the Belgian side. The states signed a treaty in 2016 to swap these plots of land, which are the result of river straightening prior to 1980.
  - The Zeelandic Flanders (733 km^{2}/283 sq mi) is a part of the Netherlands, but has land access only from Belgium, and through the Western Scheldt undersea tunnel built 2003.
- Belize: Ambergris Caye is an island in Belize located south of the Mexican state of Quintana Roo. It is separated from the rest of the country and has a land border with Mexico though there is no road crossing through mangrove and multiple rivers .
- Bolivia: Copacabana and the surrounding promontory are separated from the rest of Bolivia by Lake Titicaca, only joining by land to Peruvian territory. Access to Bolivia is only available via ferry.
- Cambodia: Preah Vihear, 11th-century Hindu temple, can only be reached by traveling through Thailand.
- Canada:
  - St. Regis, Quebec: Part of the Akwesasne Mohawk Nation, on the south shore of the Saint Lawrence River, has a land border with St. Regis Mohawk Reservation in New York State; road access to the rest of Canada is only available through New York State.
  - Campobello Island, New Brunswick can be reached by road only by driving through the United States, across the border bridge to Maine. Connection with the rest of Canada is by ferry.
  - The entrance to Aroostook Valley Country Club near Fort Fairfield, Maine, is in the U.S., but most of the club's golf course and its clubhouse are in Canada. Members and their guests, as long as they remain on the club's property, are not required to clear Canadian customs. Although a shorter route to Canada exists, members coming from Canada must do a 33 kilometres (21 mi) detour to report to U.S. border inspection before proceeding to the golf club.
  - The Haskell Free Library and Opera House straddles the border. The Canadian part of the building is a practical exclave of Canada, as most of the building is physically in Stanstead, Quebec, but the only public access to the building is via the front door on Caswell Avenue in Derby Line, Vermont, in the United States. (Emergency exits from the second floor open to Canada.) People in Canada may not enter or exit the building except by travelling into the U.S. A special exception allows library and opera house patrons to cross the border to enter and move about in the building, but they must return to their home country (or see the Customs office) to avoid being charged with illegally entering the other country.
  - The Salmon Glacier and Granduc Mine in Premier, British Columbia can only be reached by road through Hyder, Alaska.
- Chile: Magallanes Region of Chile, the southernmost portion of the Chilean mainland, is a practical exclave. The southernmost location that can be reached by road from the core of Chile is Villa O'Higgins in Aysén Region. Before the construction of the Carretera Austral, and its side-routes, the practical exclave included the Aysén Region and other locations such as Futaleufú.
- Croatia:
  - Croatia/Bosnia and Herzegovina: A few houses and the castle Zrinski, belonging to the municipality of Hrvatska Kostajnica, lie on the right bank of the Una river, and are connected to the municipality by a bridge. The border crosses the FK Partizan Kostajnica football club's pitch, leaving approximately 1/3 of the pitch on the Croatian territory.
  - Croatia/Serbia: The Croatian village of Kenđija is a pene-exclave on the left bank of the Danube, and can be reached by road only through Serbia (See Croatia–Serbia border dispute).
  - Croatia/Hungary: The Croatian village of Križnica lies on the left bank of the river Drava, and is connected to the rest of the country by a pedestrian bridge.
  - Croatia/Slovenia: A small portion of the Croatian village of Mali Tabor lies on the right bank of the river Sutla and can be reached only through Slovenian territory.
- Denmark/Germany: Several farms on the border, e.g. Vilmkærgård (similar situation as Canada's Haskell Free Library, immediately above). Between 1920 and 1927, the popular German tourist island Sylt was accessible only by boat from Højer, ceded to Denmark in 1920. A direct German route was built in 1927.
- Finland/Sweden: The city centre of the Finnish city of Tornio is a pene-enclave unreachable directly by land from Finnish territory, although connected to the rest of Finland by a pair of bridges. The neighbouring Swedish municipality of Haparanda has two similar pene-enclaves unreachable directly from Swedish territory. One is an islet crossed by the international border at a golf course on the line between Tornio and Haparanda.
- France: The territorial water of Canada completely surrounds that of the French territorial collectivity of St Pierre and Miquelon except for an EEZ corridor 10.5 NM (19.4 km) wide stretching 200 NM (370 km) to the south. This corridor is wholly enclosed within the EEZ of Canada due to the EEZ of Sable Island to the southeast of Nova Scotia.
- Germany/Switzerland:
  - The smaller part of the German city of Konstanz, which includes the Altstadt (old town), lies to the south of the Rhine and has no land border with Germany, being otherwise surrounded by Switzerland; it is linked to the rest of Konstanz, and by extension to the rest of Germany, by a bridge.
  - The Swiss town of Stein am Rhein has only a bridge over the Rhine connecting it to the rest of Switzerland, which it does not border on land, and is otherwise surrounded by Germany.
- Guatemala/Mexico: The changing course of the Río Suchiate has created pene-exclaves on both banks of the river.
- Guyana/Venezuela: The coastal border runs in a straight, northwest–southeast line next to the beach, producing a pene-exclave of Guyana on Isla Corocoro 12 miles long and 300 feet wide at its narrowest.
- Hong Kong: Shenzhen Bay Control Point (aka Hong Kong Port Area) (0.50 km^{2}, 22.5039°N 113.9447°E), Hong Kong's immigration/customs control point that is surrounded by China (Guangdong province – Nanshan district), is located at the northern terminus of the Hong Kong–Shenzhen Western Corridor. It is contiguous with the rest of Hong Kong only by the road surface of the motorway (the sea, including the clearance between the sea and the bridge, and the airspace remain under Chinese jurisdiction). The Hong Kong Government must pay rent to the Shenzhen municipal government for the use of the port area, amounting to CN¥ 6 million per year until 2018, when a deal was reached to slash it to CN¥ 1,000 starting from 2019. The rental agreement lasts until 30 June 2047.
- Ireland/United Kingdom: The westernmost region of County Monaghan in Ireland contains a pene-enclave jutting into County Fermanagh, United Kingdom, known as the Drummully Polyp or Salient (also locally as Coleman Island after the name of its northernmost townland, Coleman). There are two inaccessible districts: Drumard in the 'polyp' itself, belongs to Ireland and is inaccessible directly by road from any other part of Ireland; the village of Summerhill, County Fermanagh in the United Kingdom is similarly inaccessible from the rest of the United Kingdom. The A3 (UK) and N54 (Ireland) road, known as the Concession Road, crosses the border here 4 times in a short distance.
- Italy:
  - The Livigno valley near the Swiss border was at one time accessible only from Switzerland and was exempt from Italian customs, an exemption that continues today even though road access to the rest of Italy has been established. It is therefore excluded from EU VAT area.
  - The village of Bagni di Craveggia can only be reached by travelling through the Canton of Ticino in Switzerland. The village never became part of Switzerland, as the pastures surrounding it were owned by the people of Vigezzo Valley, rather than the people of the Swiss Onsernone Valley, at the end of which the village is situated. Consequently, the Swiss franc is commonly used.
  - On the San Marino/Italy border, there is Italian land east of the River San Marino that does not join to any other part of 'dry' Italian territory. This area is only a few metres wide, and follows the river's course for around 500 metres, and is close to the Strada del Lavoro.
- Lithuania: Curonian Spit's northern part in the Klaipėda District is bounded by Russia and the Baltic Sea, but has the common territorial waters of Lithuania.
- Mexico/United States of America: Shifts in the meandering course of the lower Rio Bravo del Norte (Rio Grande) have created numerous pene-exclaves. Under the Boundary Treaty of 1970 and earlier treaties, the two nations have maintained the actual course of the river as the international boundary, but both must approve proposed changes. From 1989 to 2009, there were 128 locations where the river changed course, causing land that had been on one side of the river to then occupy the opposite bank. Until the boundary is officially changed, there are 60 small pene-exclaves of the state of Texas now lying on the southern side of the river, as well as 68 such pene-exclaves of Mexico on the northern side of the river. The last such exchange (of pre-1989 river cuts) occurred in 2009, after languishing as a proposal for 20 years.
- Malaysia: In the state of Sarawak on the island of Borneo, the Limbang Division is completely cut off from the rest of the state's road network. The Limbang District in the division is only accessible by road through Brunei, as it is located between Brunei's main portion and the Temburong District. The Lawas District, on the other hand, lies between Temburong and the state of Sabah. As Sabah and Sarawak have autonomy in immigration affairs, immigration checks are required when travelling into or out of the Limbang Division by road.
- Namibia: Mpalila Island can only be reached from the rest of the country by travelling through Botswana.
- Netherlands: Part of the province of Zeeland, namely Zeelandic Flanders is accessible by land only through the country of Belgium, although it is accessible by sea from the rest of the province of Zeeland. There is a tunnel, the Westerscheldetunnel, which also links Zeelandic Flanders to the rest of the province.
- Norway/Sweden: Properties 79/3 and 79/4 (59°39′17″N 11°51′50″E) at Trosterud in Aurskog-Høland Municipality, Norway, are only accessible by a road that follows the Norwegian–Swedish boundary. Some nearby houses in Sweden are only accessible from that road that is connected to a larger road only in Norway.
- Portugal: An area north of Tourém is cut off from the rest of Portuguese territory by the lake Encoro de Salas, being surrounded by Spanish territory. It is accessible by a road bridge, but otherwise does not border the rest of Portugal.
- Russia:
  - Dubki area is bounded by Estonia and Lake Peipsi-Pihkva.
  - The settlement of Maloje Kulisko is separated from the rest of the country by the Kuuleski River; the village is otherwise surrounded by Estonian territory, although as it is a bog island, it is not accessible from Estonia either.
  - Vistula Spit's eastern part in the Kaliningrad Area is bounded by Poland and the Baltic Sea, but has the common territorial waters of Russia.
- Senegal: An area of marshy land, approximately 1-mile (1.6 km) south of Tiong, Mauritania is owned by Senegal, but is inaccessible from any other part of Senegal. Coastal waters, however, are contiguous.
- Serbia/Bosnia and Herzegovina: In the vicinity of Međurečje a salient belonging to Serbia is connected by a 30-metre-wide, 660-metre-long land corridor. It has road access only by passing through Bosnia and Herzegovina (43°36'10.3"N 19°15'49.5"E).
- Slovenia: A farmhouse and a few other buildings in the village of Rigonce on the left bank of the river Sotla/Sutla can only be reached through Croatia.
- Spain: Os de Civís is inaccessible via any other part of Spanish territory, as one has to travel via Andorra.
- Sweden: The settlements Naimakka, Keinovuopio and some few more farms located on the Swedish side of the Könkämäeno river have road access only on the Finnish side.
- Togo: A territory in the northwestern end of Togo is only accessible through Burkina Faso.
- Turkey:
  - The European section of Turkey is bounded by Greece and Bulgaria. Despite that the European section and the Asian section of Turkey are not geographically conterminous and are separated by the Turkish Straits, there are three connecting bridges, one highway and one railway tunnel in Istanbul and one bridge in Çanakkale.
  - The valley of Macahel, which includes five villages in northeastern Turkey, can only be reached by vehicle via Batumi in Georgia. In winter, as the snow shuts the paths that are completely within the borders of Turkey, the road via Batumi is the only way to travel there.
  - Turkey has a pene-exclave west of the Maritsa River opposite Edirne (Adrianople), with a land boundary of 10.8 km with Greece.
- Uganda: The extreme tip of Tanzania's Kanyiragwa peninsula is a very small pene-exclave of Uganda on the shore of Lake Victoria, created by the parallel of latitude that defines most of the border between Uganda and Tanzania.
- United Kingdom: Northern Ireland is bounded by Ireland, the Irish Sea and the Atlantic Ocean.
- United States of America/Canada:
  - Although Alaska is itself a pene-exclave (road access is primarily via the Alaska Highway), much of the Alaska Panhandle consists of mountainous peninsulas; many communities along the coast lack road connection to other parts of Alaska directly, such as the state capital, Juneau. Three communities are connected by road to Canada with no road to any other point in Alaska: Haines via the Haines Highway; Skagway via the Klondike Highway; and Hyder to Stewart, British Columbia. The distance between Haines and Skagway is about 16 miles (26 km) by the Alaska Marine Highway car ferry but 350 miles (560 km) by road through Canada. Hyder is the only point in the U.S. that can be entered legally without reporting for border inspection; while Canada maintains a border post on the road to Stewart, the U.S. border post was closed in the 1970s. Hyder is connected to the rest of Alaska only by a seaplane service to Ketchikan, with customs inspection done on arrival in Ketchikan.
  - Point Roberts, Washington, is bounded by British Columbia, Canada, the Strait of Georgia, and Boundary Bay. It can be reached from the rest of Washington State only via road through two border crossings.
  - A slice of land on the edge of Lake Metigoshe lies in North Dakota's Roland Township bordering Winchester, Canada.
  - A peninsula juts into North Dakota within the Osthus Lake in Rolette County, North Dakota, 500 meters south of Gunnville Lake and 700 meters east of Wakopa Creek, in the Wakopa Wildlife Management Area.
  - The Northwest Angle – the northernmost part of Lake of the Woods County, Minnesota, and the northernmost part of the contiguous 48 states – is bounded by Manitoba, Canada and Lake of the Woods. Access to the rest of Minnesota is only via boat or by a pair of vehicular border crossings.
  - Elm Point, Minnesota and two small pieces of uninhabited land just to its west (Buffalo Bay Point) are also bounded by Manitoba and Lake of the Woods.
  - The Alburgh Tongue in Lake Champlain, location of the town of Alburgh, Vermont, is bounded by Quebec, Canada to the north. The community can be reached via road bridges from Vermont or New York.
  - Province Point, the small end of a peninsula east of Alburgh, Vermont, is bounded by Quebec and Lake Champlain.
  - Estcourt Station, Maine, does not have public road access to the rest of Maine. Instead, Estcourt Station's houses, store and gas station access Rue Frontiere, a street on the Canadian side of the border in Pohenegamook, Quebec.

==== Divided islands ====
- Argentina/Chile:
  - Isla Grande de Tierra del Fuego is a shared island; the eastern section is part of Argentina's Tierra del Fuego province and the western is part of Chile. The island is surrounded by the Beagle Channel, the Strait of Magellan, and the Atlantic and Pacific Oceans.
  - Isla Dos Hitos in Lago General Carrera/Lago Buenos Aires is shared.
  - The border divides an island formed by branches of the Río Mayer.
- Bahrain/Saudi Arabia: Middle East Causeway Embankment No. 4 is an island situated on the King Fahd Causeway in the Persian Gulf. On this small hourglass-shaped island is the border between the two nations, each connected to the island by a bridge. The border station was designed as two connected islands, with the west side designated as Saudi Arabian and the east as Bahraini.
- Belarus and Latvia's international border divides an island in Lake Rychy; hence, each has a pene-exclave there.
- Belarus/Lithuania: Sosnovec Island and another nameless island in Lake Drūkšiai are each divided by the two nations; hence, they are pene-exclaves.
- Bolivia and Chile share an island formed by the Río Putani and its branch, Quebrado Coipacoipani.
- Brunei/Indonesia/Malaysia: Borneo's subdivisions include a part of Malaysia (the states of Sabah and Sarawak), the nation of Brunei, and a part of Indonesia that are conterminous.
- Canada and Denmark share Hans Island in Nunavut and Greenland respectively.
- Djibouti and Ethiopia each have a pene-exclave on an island off Cape Aleilou in Lake Abbe. Only the eastern tip of the island belongs to Djibouti.
- Finland and Norway each have pene-exclaves on two divided lake islands and one divided river islet on their international border.
- Finland/Sweden:
  - The Finnish municipality of Tornio and the neighbouring Swedish municipality of Haparanda share an islet crossed by the international border at a golf course on the line between the two.
  - Märket is a small 3.3-hectare (8.2-acre) uninhabited island in the Baltic Sea, which has been divided between the two nations since the Treaty of Fredrikshamn of 1809. The unusual border consists of eight line segments and takes the form of an inverted 'S', with the island's lighthouse connected to the rest of Finland only by a short stretch of land.
  - Kataja Island (Inakari in Finnish) is divided into two pene-exclaves, one of each nation. It was formed by the merger of two smaller islands due to post-glacial rebound.
- Finland/Russia:
  - Koiluoto Island, located in the Gulf of Finland in the Baltic Sea, is divided by the two nations; hence, it consists of a pene-exclave of each.
  - The two also divide Vanhasaari/Maly Pogranichny), Jähi, and an island southeast of Peräluoto.
  - The two nations also each have pene-exclaves on ten divided islands in lakes on their international border.
- Indonesia/Malaysia: Sebatik Island, a satellite island of Borneo, is divided between the two nations.
- Indonesia/Papua New Guinea: On the island of New Guinea, West Papua is surrounded by Papua New Guinea, the Arafura Sea and the Pacific Ocean.
- Indonesia/Timor-Leste: Timor island is divided between the two nations.
- Ireland/United Kingdom: The islet of Pollatawny 54°32′40″N 8°0′25″W in Lough Vearty lies on the international border; hence, each nation has a pene-exclave there.
- Lithuania/Russia: An island in the Šešupė River is divided between Lithuania and the Kaliningrad Oblast of Russia.
- North Korea/South Korea:
  - A small lake island is divided between North Korea and Songsan-ri, Paju-si, Gyeonggi-do, South Korea at 37°55′28.68″N 126°40′31.65″E.
  - A river island at 38°2′28.81″N 126°51′18.70″E is split between them.
- Norway and Russia each have pene-exclaves on two divided islands and one divided islet in two lakes on their international border.
- Norway/Sweden: On their international border, Norway and Sweden divide 16 lake islands and one river islet into pene-exclaves of each nation.
- Poland and Germany divide Usedom Island, in the northern part of the Szczecin Lagoon.
- St. Martin/Sint Maarten in the Caribbean Sea are pene-exclaves of France and the Kingdom of the Netherlands, respectively.
- Turkey:
  - The tripoint junction (41°42′40″N 26°21′28″E) of the borders of Turkey, Greece and Bulgaria is on an island in the Maritsa River known as Kavak Ada or Évros Alpha. Thus it contains three pene-exclaves.
  - Turkey and Greece divide an island in the Maritsa River known as island Q located at 41°20′10″N 26°36′50″E, thus each nation has a pene-exclave there.
- United States of America/Canada: The two nations share extremely long borders defined by two meridians of longitude and the 49th parallel of north latitude, crossing many lakes and rivers and, in at least 46 locations, dividing many islands. Each divided island contains a pene-exclave of each nation:
  - Canada and the U.S. divide an island in the Columbia River at 49°0.04′N 117°38.01′W near the Waneta border crossing of Washington and British Columbia.
  - Salt Lake in northeastern Montana, known as Alkali Lake in Saskatchewan, contains an island that is crossed by the international border at its southern tip (49°0′0″N 104°18′39.4″W). When the lake is not dry, the island forms pene-exclaves of each nation.
  - The two nations also divide two islands on their international border in Boundary Lake, North Dakota and Manitoba. The larger eastern island lies at 48°59′57″N 100°12′47″W; the tiny western island is at 48°59′57″N 100°13′1.5″W.
  - Each nation has a pene-exclave on the 77-acre Province Island at 45.00491°N 72.23131°W in Lake Memphremagog, Vermont and Quebec. The small southern tip is on the U.S. side; the remaining 90% of the island is Canadian.
  - The two nations divide Pine and Curry Island in Lake of the Woods on the Minnesota/Ontario border at 48.876967°N 94.683964°W
  - In addition to the above, the two nations share a border on approximately 17 other lake islands (5 are in Alaska/Yukon) and approximately 50 other river islands (37 in Alaska/Yukon, including at least 18 among greatly bifurcated flows). The 13 river islands outside of Alaska and Yukon border the states of Washington, Montana, North Dakota and Maine (1, 7, 1 and 4, respectively) and the Canadian provinces of British Columbia, Alberta, Saskatchewan, Manitoba, Quebec and New Brunswick (1, 5, 2, 1, 1 and 3, respectively). The 17 lake islands at lower latitudes are shared by the states of Washington, Montana, North Dakota, Minnesota, Michigan, Vermont and Maine (2, 2, 9, 1, 1, 1 and 1, respectively), and the Canadian provinces of British Columbia, Alberta, Saskatchewan, Manitoba, Ontario, Quebec and New Brunswick (2, 1, 2, 8, 2, 1 and 1, respectively).

=== Subnational pene-enclaves/exclaves (inaccessible districts) ===
- In Australia:
  - The sparsely-inhabited Jervis Bay Territory occupies a coastal peninsula. It is not part of the Australian Capital Territory (ACT), but the laws of the ACT do apply to it. The Jervis Bay Territory is administered by the government of the ACT and thus it is a pene-exclave, accessible only by travel through New South Wales.
  - The border between Victoria and New South Wales runs along the top of the south bank of the Murray River as far east as the source, thus the entire bank between the source and South Australian border technically constitutes a pene-enclave of New South Wales, accessible by crossing the river by road only through Victoria.
- In Brazil:
  - The village of Paranapiacaba, a district of Santo André municipality, is only accessible by road through the Rio Grande da Serra municipality.
- In Canada:
  - The village of Atlin, British Columbia, is only accessible by road through the Yukon Territory.
  - The village of Tungsten, Northwest Territories is only accessible by road through the Yukon.
  - Similarly, to reach the towns of Fort McPherson, Tsiigehtchic and Inuvik in the Inuvik Region by road from elsewhere in the Northwest Territories, it is necessary to drive into Yukon and take the Dempster Highway.
  - Cold Lake, a large C-shaped lake, straddles the border between Alberta and Saskatchewan in such a way that a peninsula in Albertan territory can only be reached overland by passing through Saskatchewan's Meadow Lake Provincial Park.
  - All islands in Hudson Bay, including those within James Bay, and islands in Ungava Bay and Hudson Strait, are part of the territory of Nunavut; many of those along the Ontario or Québec coasts are accessible from those provinces over frozen ice at times rather than the rest of the territory.
  - North Shore communities in eastern Québec are accessible by road only through Labrador, separated by a gap in Route 138.
- In China:
  - Most of Chongming Island at the mouth of the Yangtze is administered as Chongming County of Shanghai municipality. However, a long swath of the northern side of the island was added to the island in the 1970s from the formerly separate island of Yonglongsha. It is divided between Haiyong and Qilong townships, which are administered as pene-exclaves of Nantong's county-level cities of Haimen and Qidong, respectively. Formerly connected only by ferry, they joined the mainland's road network with the completion of the Chongqi Bridge, although all routes now pass through Shanghai's territory
- In Colombia, the municipality of Tumaco (Nariño) has a pene-exclave (San Juan de la Costa) between the Pacific Ocean and the municipalities of Francisco Pizarro and Mosquera.
- In Croatia:
  - Slatine on the island of Čiovo is a pene-enclave of the city of Split, as it can be reached by road only via three other municipalities (Solin, Kaštela and Trogir).
  - The north-western part of the municipality of Tisno is separated from the rest of the municipality by the municipality of Pirovac.
  - The villages of Vlašići and Smokvica belong to the town of Pag, but are separated from it by the municipality of Povljana.
- In Estonia:
  - Haapsalu urban municipality is a coastal pene-enclave of Lääne-Nigula Parish;
  - Loksa is a coastal pene-enclave of Kuusalu Parish;
  - Aegna island subdistrict of Tallinn lies on the coast of Viimsi Parish, while Naissaar island of Viimsi Parish lies closer to Tallinn and Harku Parish.
  - Kõinastu islet village of Saaremaa Parish is accessible both by sea from Saaremaa island and on land and shallow water from the insular Muhu Parish;
- In Finland, the South Karelian municipality of Taipalsaari is spread across several islands and peninsulas in Lake Saimaa; many are only accessible by road from its neighbouring municipalities. For example, the village of Merenlahti is located on a small peninsula, and the only way to get there by road is through Lappeenranta.
- In France, the village of Montfroc (Drôme) is a pene-exclave surrounded by Alpes-de-Haute-Provence and the salient of Drôme.
- In Germany, the North Sea islands of Neuwerk, Scharhörn and Nigehörn off the Lower Saxon coast are pene-exclaves of the federal state of Hamburg. During low tide, one can reach the tidal island of Neuwerk on foot or by horse carriages.
- In Hong Kong:
  - 9 and 11 Anderson Road and Anderson Road Service Reservoir within Sai Kung District of the New Territories are only accessible from On Sau Road which lies within Wong Tai Sin District of New Kowloon, after this part of Anderson Road was demolished in 2014.
  - Northernmost part of Chek Lap Kok island, part of the third runway of the Chek Lap Kok Airport, which has a land border with Islands District while itself being part of Tuen Mun District, has no direct access overland or by road with the rest of its district.
  - Southern part of Hong Kong Disneyland Resort in Penny's Bay, part of Islands District, is only accessible over land through Tsuen Wan District.
  - The southeastern end of the Kai Tak Development Area, itself within Kowloon City District, is only accessible by road from Kwun Tong District via Cheung Yip Street, Shing Cheong Road, Kai Tak Bridge and Shing Fung Road.
  - Ma Wan is part of Tsuen Wan District, but only has land access with the rest of the district through Tsing Yi, which is part of Kwai Tsing District.
  - The northern part of Sai Kung Peninsula, known collectively as Sai Kung North, is a part of Tai Po District, not Sai Kung District. There is no direct road link between the two areas.
  - Southern tip of the west breakwater of the naval base on the southern part of Stonecutters Island, which crosses the southern edge of Sham Shui Po District into Kwai Tsing District, is only accessible from the rest of Kwai Tsing District by traveling through Sham Shui Po District.
  - Tsing Chau Tsai Peninsula, which is located in the northeastern part of Lantau Island, is not a part of Islands District, but rather Tsuen Wan District.
- In Iceland:
  - Hafnarfjörður municipality is divided into two sections, on opposite sides of a peninsula.
  - Skagabyggð municipality has two noncontiguous pieces with sea access.
  - The municipality of Grímsnes- og Grafningshreppur has three sections. Two sections are connected at a quadripoint, and the third is effectively separate, although administrative boundaries are undetermined. If this section is in fact connected, then the municipality of Bláskógabyggð would be divided in two (although still connected at the aforementioned quadripoint).
- In India:
  - The Union Territory of Dadra and Nagar Haveli and Daman and Diu includes two coastal exclaves in the state of Gujarat: Diu Island and Daman district
  - In Tamil Nadu State, the Kalakkad Mundanthurai Tiger Reserve contains 27 exclaves of the two districts of Kanyakumari and Tirunelveli.
- In Indonesia:
  - The province of Yogyakarta is a coastal enclave of Central Java province with access to the Indian Ocean in the south.
  - In North Sumatra, the city of Medan is a coastal enclave of Deli Serdang regency with access to the Strait of Malacca in the north.
  - In South Sumatra, the districts of Tanjung Sakti Pumi and Tanjung Sakti Pumu in Lahat Regency, which lies west of Pagar Alam City, is only accessible by road to the rest of the regency through Pagar Alam City.
  - In East Java, the districts of Kasembon, Ngantang, and Pujon in Malang Regency, which lies west of Batu City, is only accessible by road to the rest of the Regency through Batu City.
  - In Central Sulawesi, eleven of the sixteen districts of Donggala Regency are collectively separated from the rest of the regency by the city of Palu, Sigi Regency and Palu Bay.
  - In South Sulawesi, six districts of Luwu Regency, namely Walenrang, East Walenrang, West Walenrang, North Walenrang, Lamasi, and East Lamasi, are separated from the rest of the regency by the city of Palopo.
  - In West Nusa Tenggara, two districts of Bima Regency, namely Tambora, and Sanggar, are separated from the rest of the regency by the Dompu Regency.
- In Ireland:
  - The townland of Aughinish in the parish of Oughtmama is a coastal pene-exclave of County Clare, from where it can be accessed by land only by travelling through County Galway.
  - Sheanbeg is a townland east of Lismore, County Waterford that can only be accessed by road by passing through County Cork. Similarly, the adjacent townland of Marshtown in County Cork can only be accessed by passing through County Waterford.
- In Isle of Man, the parish of Rushen is split into two sections by Port Erin and Port St. Mary.
- In Italy:
  - The southern part of the Province of Venice, Veneto, can be reached by land only by travelling through the Province of Padua.
  - The municipality of Oliveto Lario on the shore of Lake Como belongs to the Province of Lecco, Lombardy, but can be reached by land only through the Province of Como.
  - The village of Santa Margherita on the shore of Lake Lugano belongs to the municipality of Valsolda (Province of Como), but can be reached by land only by travelling through the municipalities of Claino con Osteno and Porlezza.
- In Macau:
  - The campus of the University of Macau is defined to be part of the statutory definition of Taipa and part of Freguesia de Nossa Senhora do Carmo but is only accessible through an undersea tunnel connected to Cotai.
- In Malaysia:
  - Cape Rachado is an exclave of state of Malacca, which lies on the coast of Negeri Sembilan.
  - Cameron Highlands lies in the state of Pahang, but for many years the only road access was from Tapah in the state of Perak. A second route to Simpang Pulai in Perak and Gua Musang in Kelantan was opened in 2004. It was not until 2010 when the Malaysia Federal Route 102 was completed, connecting the highlands to the rest of Pahang.
- In Mexico, Calica and Xel-Há are two polygons of land belonging to the municipality of Cozumel in the state of Quintana Roo which are bounded by the municipalities of Solidaridad and Tulum, respectively. Both polygons possess a coastline.
- In Moldova, Tiraspol, the capital city of the breakaway territory of Transnistria, lies on the left bank of the Dniester River but has two pene-exclaves on the right bank inside an oxbow bend, which must be accessed on land through the Căuşeni district.
- In Montenegro, the southern portion of the municipality of Herceg Novi can be accessed by land only through the municipalities of Kotor and Tivat.
- In the Netherlands, the province of Overijssel has two pene-exclaves on the Gelderland bank of the IJssel river opposite the towns of Olst and Wijhe, in which the villages of Marle (northerly), Welsum and Welsumerveld (southerly) are situated. There are cable ferries between Olst and Welsum and between Wijhe and Vorchten in the municipality of Heerde (there is no direct connection between Marle and the rest of Overijssel).
- In Norway, Asker Municipality and Bærum Municipality in Akershus county are separated from the rest of the county by land that belongs to the counties of Oslo and Buskerud and the Oslofjorden. However, these municipalities border on the bay of Oslofjord.
- In the Philippines:
  - In Soccsksargen, Sarangani province is divided by General Santos and Sarangani Bay.
  - In Zamboanga Peninsula:
    - Isabela City is part of this region (although it is the capital of the Bangsamoro province of Basilan), but it is separated from it by Basilan Strait.
    - Zamboanga del Sur – Zamboanga City, a chartered city, is unofficially part of this province but is separated from it by Zamboanga Sibugay.
  - In Romblon Province, the exclave of the municipality of Looc is separated by the Looc Bay forming a peninsula with neighboring municipality of Santa Fe.
- In Portugal, Vila Real de Santo António is divided into 3 freguesias, with one a few kilometres west of the other two. The "main," eastern part of its territory (where the municipal seat stands and where most of its inhabitants live) is more than three times smaller than the "secondary" part. To go from the eastern part to the western, one must pass through territory belonging to the municipality of Castro Marim, or go by sea, as all 3 freguesias face the Atlantic Ocean to the South.
- In the Republic of China (Taiwan), Keelung City (part of Taiwan Province) faces East China Sea on one side and borders New Taipei City (a special municipality not a part of Taiwan Province) on all other sides.
- In Romania, the village of Nămoloasa (Galați County) can be accessed only through Vrancea County (where there is a bridge over the Siret) because it is separated by the Siret from the rest of Galați county.
- In Russia:
  - Adjacent to the northwestern boundary of Moscow, there is a small exclave of the Krasnogorsk administrative district located at the 65-km mark outside of the 137-km Moscow Ring Road (Moskovskaya Koltsevaya Avtomobilnaya Doroga or MKAD), within which the administrative center and regional court are located. This area lacks access to the nearby Moscow River.
- In Samoa, A'ana, Palauli, Satupa'itea, and Va'a-o-Fonoti districts each have one exclave, and Gaga'emauga district has two. All parts of each district have sea access.
- In South Korea:
  - Incheon Metropolitan City: Ganghwa Island is administered by Incheon, but is connected by bridges to Gyeonggi Province.
  - Yeongjong Island, where Incheon International Airport is located, is administered by Jung-gu, but is connected by bridges to Seo-gu and Yeonsu-gu. (A "gu" is a geo-political subdivision of S. Korea's metropolitan cities).
- In Switzerland:
  - Lucerne has two pieces separated from the main territory by Lake Lucerne; one borders Schwyz, the other Nidwalden.
  - Bern has a municipitality named La Scheulte that has only a 12-metre border with the rest of the Canton of Bern, which can be reached only through the Canton of Jura or through the Canton of Solothurn. 47°20'01.9"N 7°33'08.2"E
  - Nidwalden's district of Hergiswil is separated by an arm of Lake Lucerne.
  - One of the pieces of Fribourg is a large exclave bounded by Vaud and Lake Neuchâtel.
  - Vaud has one exclave, Avenches, bordered by Lake Neuchâtel and Fribourg. Neuchâtel also has one small pene-exclave, Tour romande, on the opposite shore of Lake Neuchâtel, bordering Bern, Fribourg, and Vaud (Avenches exclave). The coast of Lake Neuchâtel is thus separated into eight pieces belonging to four cantons: clockwise from the north they are Neuchâtel (main), Bern (main), Neuchâtel (pene-exclave), Vaud (exclave), Fribourg (main), Vaud (main), Fribourg (exclave), Vaud (main).
  - Within Vaud, Geneva has a pene-exclave on the shoreline on Lake Geneva. It is one of the two separate parts of the commune of Céligny.
- In Ukraine, Kinburn peninsula is administratively a part of Mykolaiv Oblast but can be reached by land only from Kherson Oblast, as it is surrounded by sea from the main part of Mykolaiv Oblast.
- In the United Arab Emirates:
  - The emirate of Sharjah has three pene-exclaves on the Gulf of Oman: Dibba Al-Hisn, Khor Fakkan and Kalbā. Kalbā has two separate parts (east and west) connected by a middle zone that is administered jointly with Fujairah. Al 'Ayn al Ghumūr, Samāḩ and Waḩlah are located in this middle zone. Western Kalbā contains Zārūb, Maskūnah, Falaj, Ḩarrah, Mazārī', Fayyāᶁ, Wādī La'ili, Wādī Muᶁayq, Minazif and Dhabābiḩah.
  - The emirate of Fujairah comprises two noncontiguous sections on the Gulf of Oman. The southerly of these two sections itself has two separate parts (north and south) connected by the aforementioned middle zone that is administered jointly with Sharjah. Wādī Umm al Ghāt, Wādī al Qūr and Wādī 'Abd al 'Aram are in the southernmost part.
- In the United Kingdom:
  - England:
    - The village of Pentreheyling in Shropshire, near the Welsh border and south-east of Montgomery, is disconnected from the rest of England by road. (see map).
    - On the English side of the English/Scottish border, the hamlet of High Cocklaw is not accessible directly from any other part of England except via footpath.
    - Newmarket is part of the County of Suffolk, but has only a small strip of land connecting it to the rest of the county and is otherwise entirely surrounded by Cambridgeshire.
  - Scotland: There are two parts inaccessible from anywhere else other than by travelling through England: these are Edrington Castle and the village of Cawderstanes, which is accessible to the rest of Scotland by footbridge only. There is also a small area of land adjacent to a weir on the River Tweed, north of the B6350 road, due south of Coldstream and due south west of Cornhill on Tweed, from where one can reach the rest of Scotland directly only by crossing the weir.
  - Wales:
    - In Flintshire, on the Dee estuary, there are several bits of marshland that are separated from other bits of Wales.
    - There is also a small area of land south of Wyastone Leys that is inaccessible from any other area of Wales directly by road, being separated by land and the River Wye.
    - Several small uninhabited areas near the hamlet of Part-Y-Seal or Pant-Y-Seal near Grosmont, Monmouthshire are inaccessible from Wales directly; these include one farm, two river banks and a small island in the River Monnow. These appear to be due to shifts in the course of the river.
- In the United States of America:
  - Shifts in the meandering course of the lower Mississippi River have created numerous pene-exclaves.
    - Arkansas has territory at 35.65°N 89.87°W across the Mississippi River on the northwest edge of Tennessee's Fort Pillow State Park, north of the Corona/Reverie, Tennessee irregularity (see below).
    - Illinois' Kaskaskia, Missouri's Grand Tower Island and other Illinois and Missouri territory on each other's side of the Mississippi River.
    - The state of Mississippi controls at least 11 exclaves on the west bank of the Mississippi River in Louisiana, while Louisiana owns 8 exclaves on Mississippi's side.
    - Mississippi state also owns 14 exclaves on the bank in Arkansas, while Arkansas has 15 of its own on Mississippi's side.
  - In California:
    - Coast Guard Island in the Oakland estuary is part of the city of Alameda but it is accessible only via a bridge from Oakland.
    - The seaport of San Pedro is part of the City of Los Angeles but is connected to the rest of the city only by a narrow strip of land known as the Harbor Gateway, four city blocks wide and several miles long.
    - The City of San Diego has a significantly large exclave. It includes the communities of San Ysidro, Otay Mesa, Palm, and other neighborhoods considered as parts of San Diego. This piece of San Diego is separated from the main portion of San Diego by 7 miles, divided by the cities of National City and Chula Vista. Technically, it is connected to the rest of San Diego by a seven-mile-long, two-inch-wide strip of land on the bottom of San Diego Bay. Hence, it is essentially an exclave, and it is commonly referred to as "South San Diego".
    - The city of Coronado, nearly encircled by San Diego Bay, can be reached by land only via a narrow isthmus connected to Imperial Beach. A bridge also connects it to San Diego. Four other small pene-exclaves occupy the same peninsula. Coastal lands that are north of Wright Ave., at the northern end of First St., part of Coronado Ferry Landing Park, and that surround most of Naval Air Station North Island (island before 1945) are part of the city of San Diego and are accessible on land only through the city of Coronado. A large portion of the famous Coronado beach is in the City of San Diego.
    - Redwood Shores on the San Francisco Peninsula is part of Redwood City, but is only connected with the rest of the city by an area of wetland in San Francisco Bay. It is accessible only via the cities of San Carlos and Belmont.
    - Devils Postpile National Monument in eastern Madera County, California, is inaccessible from the remainder of the county due to wilderness areas of the Sierra Nevada mountain range. It can be reached only via Mono County near Mammoth Lakes.
    - The General Grant Grove is an isolated, noncontiguous section of Kings Canyon National Park.
  - Delaware – At least two parcels of land on the eastern (New Jersey) side of the Delaware River belong to the state of Delaware (the bulk of which is west of the river) and not to New Jersey. This is because within the "Twelve Mile Circle", the entire Delaware River, to the low water mark, is the territory of Delaware and not New Jersey (unlike many other river borders where the border is at some intermediate point in the river itself). As a result, certain areas (including the Killcohook National Wildlife Refuge and a portion of the Salem Nuclear Power Plant) on the New Jersey side of the river that have been expanded by adding fill into areas that were historically below the low water mark are considered part of New Castle County, Delaware, and not Salem County, New Jersey. Both of these areas are accessible by land only by traveling through New Jersey.
  - Kentucky – Ellis Park Race Course, a Thoroughbred horse racing track in Henderson, Kentucky, actually lies to the north of the Ohio River that forms the border between Kentucky and Indiana. The border is based on the river's course when Kentucky achieved statehood in 1792; a change in course to the south left the land that would later house Ellis Park cut off from the rest of Kentucky by the river. A pair of bridges across the Ohio connect the track to the rest of Kentucky.
  - Iowa – The town of Carter Lake, Iowa, occupied a meander on the left bank of the Missouri River, until 1877 when flooding caused the river to jump its banks, shortening the main stream. The meander became an oxbow lake and Carter Lake now found itself on the right bank, attached to Nebraska. A lengthy court case ensued; the Supreme Court of the United States finally held that the sudden change in the river's course did not change the original boundary, and Carter Lake was still part of Iowa. (Nebraska v. Iowa, 143 U.S. 359 (1892)). The Court delayed a final decree to allow Nebraska and Iowa to reach an agreement consistent with its holding, which the states did. (145 U.S. 519 (1892)). All of the roads into Carter Lake run through Omaha, Nebraska.
  - For similar geographic reasons several portions of Nebraska lie east of the Missouri River, mainly due to flooding and changes in the river's path:
    - DeSoto National Wildlife Refuge near Blair, which borders Iowa. A portion of Iowa is also on the Nebraska side in the same area.
    - McKissick Island near Peru, which borders Missouri.
    - A section of land that borders Iowa, Sloan.
    - Onawa Materials Yard Wildlife Area and Middle Decatur Bend State Wildlife Management Area near Onawa, Iowa.
  - Louisiana – The island of Grand Isle is part of Jefferson Parish but can be reached on land only via a bridge from Lafourche Parish.
  - In Massachusetts:
    - Acoaxet is a portion of the town of Westport that borders the Massachusetts–Rhode Island state line on its west, Buzzards Bay on its south, and the west branch of the Westport River on its east; it can only be accessed by road from Little Compton, Rhode Island.
    - There is a narrow salient of Fall River that borders the Massachusetts–Rhode Island state line on its west and the west shores of South Watuppa Pond, Stony Brook and Sawdy Pond on its east; several homes and streets located within this salient can only be accessed by road from Tiverton, Rhode Island.
    - Humarock, legally part of Scituate, was separated from the rest of the town in the Blizzard of 1898, in which the mouth of the North River shifted. The village is only accessible via a bridge that connects it to Marshfield, but has a peninsular connection to the mainland to the south at the old mouth of the North River, now Rexhame Beach.
    - Long Island, situated in Boston Harbor, is part of the City of Boston (Suffolk County) yet remains accessible by road only from Quincy (Norfolk County).
    - The town of Sandwich is partially separated in its northern portion by the Cape Cod Canal and is only accessible by road through the neighboring town of Bourne.
    - A neighborhood in Webster that lies on the south shore of Lake Chaubunagungamaug (or Webster Lake) that is detached from the rest of the town's road network and can only be accessed by roads from neighboring Thompson, Connecticut.
  - Michigan –
    - The "Lost Peninsula" in Monroe County, Michigan, can only be reached via Toledo, Ohio. It is otherwise surrounded by Maumee Bay in Lake Erie. (Map)
    - The Upper Peninsula is attached by land to Wisconsin. It is connected to the rest of Michigan via the 5 miles (8 km) Mackinac Bridge on I-75.
  - Missouri – St. Joseph Rosecrans Memorial Airport is separated from St. Joseph and Buchanan County by the Missouri River. The airport, which lies on the west bank of the river, was once on the east bank along with the remainder of the city and county. Shifts in the course of the river put it on the west bank; part of the former course of the river became Browning Lake, an oxbow lake to the south of the airport. The only land access to the airport from Missouri is via Kansas Route 238 through Elwood.
  - New Hampshire:
    - Chatham is only accessible by road through Maine.
    - In Rindge, there is a small peninsula in Lake Monomonac that is only accessible by road from Winchendon, Massachusetts.
    - Similarly, in Wakefield, a peninsula that juts out into Great East Lake can only be accessed by road from Acton, Maine.
  - In New Jersey:
    - In Ocean County, Long Beach Township is split into four parts, each with sea access.
    - Elsewhere in Ocean County, Ortley Beach and some other small sections of Toms River, otherwise inland, are located on Barnegat Peninsula.
    - In Monmouth County, the Sandy Hook peninsula is within Middletown Township, though it is not connected to the rest of the township by land.
    - The northernmost land in the state, just south of the Tri-States Monument in Sussex County's Montague Township, is the end of the point bar at the confluence of the Delaware and Neversink rivers. It can only be reached by roads that go through Port Jervis, New York.
  - In New York:
    - The construction in 1895 of the Harlem River Ship Canal isolated Marble Hill, a small portion of the northern tip of Manhattan (New York County). Initially an island, it was later physically connected to the Bronx by the filling of Spuyten Duyvil Creek. It remains politically part of Manhattan, to which it is connected by the Broadway Bridge. Thus, it is part of the Borough of Manhattan and New York County, but not the island of Manhattan.
    - Rockaway Peninsula, part of Queens, is connected to the rest of New York City only by two causeways across Jamaica Bay, or through Nassau County.
    - Riker's Island, the jail complex of the City of New York, is considered to be in the borough of The Bronx, but is only accessible via the Riker's Island Bridge, which terminates in the Borough of Queens.
    - Manhattan's borders often extend to the shorelines of the other boroughs so that, for example, certain piers extending from the Brooklyn waterfront are part of Manhattan but accessible only from Brooklyn. Manhattan (New York County) claims the entire East River bed.
    - A 250-foot-wide (76 m) strip of the Bronx is separated from the rest of the borough by Pelham Bay Park as a result of a past error in drawing the border. The only residential street in this pene-exclave, Park Drive, is accessible by car only via the town of Pelham, in Westchester County.
    - A small part of the city of Mount Vernon is cut off from the rest of the city by the Cross County Parkway. The three streets of Alta Drive, Alta Parkway and Labelle Road can only be accessed by car via the town of Eastchester.
    - The geography of the Catskill Mountains in upstate New York creates pene-exclaves in two counties. Halcott, at the southwestern corner of Greene County, and Hardenburgh, at the western corner of Ulster County, have extensive borders with neighboring towns in their respective counties. But those are along mountain ridgelines directly crossed only by hiking trails, or (in Halcott's case) poor-quality unpaved roads, and vehicles traveling to those towns from the rest of the county must take roads through neighboring counties to do so.
    - The town of Hardenbergh is also an exclave of itself. The only road directly connecting its southern half, along the upper Beaver Kill, and the northern half along Dry Brook, now runs through state-owned Forest Preserve lands and is closed to vehicle traffic. To get between those two halves, cars must travel through neighboring Delaware County.
  - In North Carolina:
    - Knotts Island in Currituck County is only accessible by road through Virginia Beach, Virginia via a narrow strip of land from the west. A 45-minute ferry connects the island to the rest of Currituck.
    - On the north shore of Lake Gaston lie several small areas connected only by land to Virginia. Most of these have road and bridge connections to North Carolina, but one small area south of Joyceville, Virginia has road connections only to Virginia.
  - In Pennsylvania, the westernmost section of the city of Allentown is a pene-en(ex)clave connected at a quadripoint with the rest of the city; it is surrounded by South Whitehall Township.
    - Also in Pennsylvania, Pond Eddy, an unincorporated area along the Delaware River in Pike County's Shohola Township, is not connected by road to anywhere else in the town, county, or state. It can only be reached by driving to the Pond Eddy Bridge via roads in New York.
  - In Rhode Island, the city of Warwick has an exclave called Potowomut separated from the main body of the city by Greenwich Bay on the north and the town of East Greenwich on the west.
    - Elsewhere in Rhode Island, Newport County consists of three islands and one mainland portion, connected to Aquidneck, by a bridge.
  - In Tennessee, over a period of about 24 hours on 7 March 1876, the Mississippi River abandoned its former channel that defined the Tennessee-Arkansas border, and established a new channel east of the town of Reverie, Tennessee. This places Reverie on the Arkansas side, while most of the area of Tipton County is located east of the Mississippi River, the Tennessee side. The direct distance between Reverie and the county seat, Covington, Tennessee, is only 18 miles (29 km), but the road trip to Covington requires the driver to cross the Mississippi River at Memphis, and it is longer than 83 miles (134 km).
  - In South Carolina, small parts of Horry County lie on the north shore of the Little River or the nearby Intracoastal Waterway and can only be reached by land connection from neighboring North Carolina. The land is unpopulated and no roads exist in the area.
  - Grand Isle County, Vermont, in that state's northwest corner, consists of the Alburgh Tongue (see above) and several islands in Lake Champlain. It is only connected to the rest of the state via bridges.
  - In Virginia:
    - The Eastern Shore, comprising Accomack County and Northampton County, is located at the southern tip of the Delmarva Peninsula, conterminous only with Maryland on its north. It is connected to the rest of Virginia by the 23-mile-long (37 km) Chesapeake Bay Bridge-Tunnel.
    - Several pieces of land along the shores of Kerr Lake and Lake Gaston can only be accessed by land from North Carolina. Some areas are undeveloped, but others, especially along the south shore of Kerr Lake, have state highways and settlement.
    - Henrico County has a small parcel across the James River from the contiguous part of the county, completely surrounded by Chesterfield County and the James River.
  - In Washington, Camano Island is part of Island County. Although Camano is contiguous with Island County via the Saratoga Passage, its residents can only drive to the rest of the county via road and bridge by traveling north through Snohomish County and Skagit County on State Route 20, or by traveling south through Snohomish County and then to Clinton via the Mukilteo-Clinton ferry on State Route 525.
  - West Virginia – A peninsula in Monongalia County bounded by Cheat Lake and Rubles Run (39°43′2″N 79°50′44″W), except for a walking trail over a dam, is only accessible by land from Fayette County, Pennsylvania, more specifically Springhill Township.
  - Wisconsin – The Mont du Lac resort and the area to its north are accessible only by a 0.8-mile (1.3 km) section of Minnesota State Highway 23 that runs through a sliver of the town of Superior in Douglas County, in Wisconsin's northwest corner. Several local dead-end roads run off it; there is no way to reach this part of the county or state by vehicle from anywhere else in Wisconsin.
  - Washington, D.C. – Theodore Roosevelt Island in the Potomac River is part of Washington, D.C., but only accessible by a footbridge from Virginia. Although the Theodore Roosevelt Bridge from Washington to Virginia passes over the island, one cannot exit from the bridge onto the island.
- In Venezuela: eastern part of the state of Zulia is connected with the rest of the state by a bridge over Lake Maracaibo, and the northeastern part of the municipality of Sucre in the state of Zulia is separated from the rest of the state by the state of Mérida.

==== Divided islands ====
- In Australia: Boundary Islet, historically known as North East Islet, is a Hogan Group islet of less than two hectares (4.9 acres) that straddles the border of the Australian states of Victoria and Tasmania. The islet is Tasmania's only land boundary, and at 85 metres (279 ft) long, it is the shortest land border between any Australian state or territory.
- In Canada:
  - Killiniq Island is shared between Nunavut and the province of Newfoundland and Labrador.
  - Nunavut and the Northwest Territories (NWT) share four islands that are split by the 110° W meridian: Borden Island, Mackenzie King Island, Melville Island and Victoria Island. Excluding lake crossings, Melville Island contains three separate land boundaries between Nunavut and NWT due to coastal undulation, while Victoria Island contains six such land boundaries, of which one is on a small island.
- In the People's Republic of China:
  - Zhongshan Dao is divided between Guangdong Province and the Special Administrative Region and former Portuguese overseas province of Macau.
  - Part of Hengqin Island in Zhuhai, Guangdong Province is leased to Macau until 2049 to house the new campus of the University of Macau. The university campus is sealed off from the rest of the island by a fence, and access to the area is provided by an underwater tunnel to Macau.
- In Croatia:
  - Pag is divided between Lika-Senj County and Zadar County.
- In Indonesia:
  - Belitung is divided between Belitung and East Belitung regencies.
  - Buru is divided between Buru and South Buru regencies in Maluku province.
  - Salawati is divided between Sorong and Raja Ampat regencies in West Papua province.
- In the United States:
  - The City and County of San Francisco has four pene-enclaves on three islands in San Francisco Bay, which it shares with neighboring counties:
    - On Alameda Island adjoining Alameda County, artificial fill on the border between the two counties to build the Naval Air Station Alameda (now decommissioned) created the pene-enclave. This small piece of open space can be reached on land only by passing through Oakland and Alameda.
    - There are two small (5.37 acres) pieces of land on the eastern end of Angel Island (Quarry Point and the tip of Point Blunt) that belong to San Francisco. The rest (99.3%) of Angel Island lies in the town of Tiburon, which is in Marin County.
    - San Francisco and Contra Costa County share Red Rock Island. A tripoint with Marin County may sometimes be exposed at low tide.
  - Bellows Falls, Vermont and Walpole, New Hampshire share an island in the Connecticut River.
  - Rhode Island and Connecticut share Sandy Point Island in Little Narragansett Bay.
  - New Jersey and New York share Shooter's Island, a bird sanctuary located in the south end of Newark Bay off the north shore of Staten Island. (The small portion in New Jersey is further divided between two counties.)
  - Delaware and Maryland share Fenwick Island.
  - Maryland and Virginia share Smith Island in Chesapeake Bay, as well as Assateague Island on the Atlantic coast.
  - Virginia and North Carolina share Knotts Island, Mon Island and Simon Island, separated from the Atlantic by an intracoastal waterway.
  - North Carolina and South Carolina share Bird Island on the Atlantic coast.
  - Florida and Alabama share Perdido Key in the Gulf of Mexico.
  - Alabama and Mississippi share South Rigolets Island in the Gulf of Mexico, as well as an unnamed coastal island at the mouth of Bayou Heron.
  - Minnesota and Wisconsin share Interstate Island State Wildlife Management Area in Saint Louis Bay between Duluth, Minnesota, and Superior, Wisconsin.
  - Michigan and Ohio share Turtle Island in Lake Erie.
  - At the mouth of the Columbia River, Oregon and Washington share Sand Island Dike and Rice Island.

== Historic enclaves/exclaves ==
=== National level ===
Name	Area (km^{2})	Exclave of	Enclaved within	Coordinates	Notes	Existed
Indo-Bangladesh enclaves (91 parcels)	21.8	Bangladesh (Rangpur Division – Panchagarh, Nilphamari, Lalmonirhat, and Kurigram districts)	India (West Bengal state – Cooch Behar and Jalpaiguri districts)	approx. 26°18′N 88°57′E	All parcels were both enclaves and exclaves. 21 of the 91 former Bangladeshi exclaves were counter-enclaves. These 91 Bangladeshi enclaves were extinguished on 31 July 2015, when the long-delayed Land Boundary Agreement with India was implemented, leaving Dahagram-Angarpota as the only extant enclave.	1949 – 2015
Indo-Bangladesh enclaves (106 parcels)	69.5	India (West Bengal state – Cooch Behar and Jalpaiguri districts)	Bangladesh (Rangpur Division – Panchagarh, Nilphamari, Lalmonirhat, and Kurigram districts)	26°9′0″N 88°45′44″E (former third-order enclave)	All parcels were both enclaves and exclaves. Three of the 106 former Indian exclaves were counter-enclaves and one was the world's only counter-counter enclave. All of the 106 Indian exclaves were extinguished on 31 July 2015, when the long-delayed Land Boundary Agreement with Bangladesh was implemented.	1949 – 2015
Barak (de facto)	2.07	Kyrgyzstan (Kara-Suu District – Osh Region)	Uzbekistan (Andijan Region)	40°40′N 72°46′E	Kyrgyzstan's 1991 pre-independence border is the de jure international border, but much of it is hotly disputed with its neighbors. In August 1999, the area around Barak was occupied by Uzbekistan, cutting it off from Kyrgyz territory. Uzbek forces dug up and blockaded the road to Ak-Tash while also allegedly seizing large areas of Kyrgyz land that had been loaned in the Soviet era but never returned. They entrenched themselves within much of Kyrgyz border territory and refused to leave. Barak became a de facto enclave only 1.5 km from the shifted main border. Four Uzbek enclaves and Barak were major sticking points in delimitation talks, and disputes centered on the areas of Barak, Sokh, Gava and Gavasay (stream). (Map) In August 2018 Kyrgyz and Uzbek authorities agreed to a land swap that would eliminate the enclave. The land swap became permanent in April 2024, when the Barak enclave was absorbed by Uzbekistan.	1999 – 2024
Chon-Qora or Qalacha (the 2 Uzbek villages in the enclave)	~3	Uzbekistan (Fergana Region – Sokh district)	Kyrgyzstan (Batken Region)	40°14′37″N 71°02′14″E	Tiny enclave lying on the Sokh River, immediately north of Sokh; measures about 3 km long by 1 km wide, with the Uzbek villages of Chon-Qora (or Chongara 40°15′03″N 71°02′15″E) and Qalacha (40°14′10″N 71°02′12″E) at either end; the Kyrgyz village of Chong-Kara (or Chon-Kara 40°15′37″N 71°00′41″E) lies 2 km northwest. [Note: The Kyrgyz Cyrillic alphabet contains three characters not present in the Uzbek alphabet. One of these characters is romanised from Kyrgyz as the digraph ng, which is not present in romanised Uzbek words.]	1991–2026
Jangail (also Jangy-ayyl) or "Tash-Dobo"	~0.8	Uzbekistan (Fergana Region – Fergana district)	Kyrgyzstan (Batken Region – Kadamjay District)	40°12′09″N 71°39′58″E	Tiny enclave north-northwest of the Shakhimardan enclave; within 1 km of the Uzbek main border; the Kyrgyz towns of Jangy-Ayyl (40°10′56″N 71°40′49″E) and Khalmion (40°12′44″N 71°37′58″E) lie outside opposite edges of this enclave.	1991–2026
Tarchen, Cherkip Gompa, Dho, Dungmar, Gesur, Gezon, Itse Gompa, Khochar, Nyanri, Ringung, Sanmar and Zuthulphuk		Bhutan	Tibet			1640s –1959

- Belgium:
  - Belgium had a counter-enclave located near Fringshaus from 6 November 1922 until 23 April 1949, while Germany owned the connecting roads that were part of the Roetgener Wald enclave. These roads met at a traffic island north of Fringshaus, with the 2279 m^{2} island itself being a part of Belgium. This counter-enclave was extinguished in 1949 when Belgium annexed the German roads that intersected at the traffic island. In 1958, when Belgium returned the east–west road to Germany, this traffic island also became part of the Roetgener Wald enclave.
- China:
  - Forbidden City – The Xinhai Revolution led to the overthrow of the Qing dynasty and the establishment of the Republic of China (ROC) in 1912. In exchange for the abdication of the last Qing emperor Puyi, the Qing court and the ROC government signed an agreement for the favourable treatment of the abdicated emperor. Puyi was allowed to retain his title as emperor and was accorded the courtesies as a foreign monarch by the ROC government, and the imperial court remained at the Forbidden City. The Dragon Flag of the Qing Dynasty remained hoisted inside the Forbidden City, certain government organs such as the Imperial Household Department, Imperial Clan Court and Ministry of Justice continued to exist within the palace walls, and the emperor continued to hold court, appoint officials and grant titles of nobility. Following the Beijing coup in 1924, the warlord Feng Yuxiang unilaterally revised the agreement, abolishing Puyi's title of emperor, his right to live in the Forbidden City and other related arrangements.
  - Unlike Hong Kong Island, the Kowloon Peninsula and the New Territories that were added later constituted a pene-exclave of the United Kingdom from 1860/1898 until 1997. Kowloon south of Boundary Street was ceded in perpetuity, whereas the New Territories was turned over under a 99-year lease.
  - Kowloon Walled City was a counter-enclave belonging to China on the Kowloon Peninsula of Hong Kong from 1898 to 1993. The question of jurisdiction led to a hands-off approach by Chinese and British authorities over the years until the quality of life became intolerable. A mutual decision to demolish the 2.6 hectares of structures was announced in 1987 and completed in 1994.
  - Kwang-Chou-Wan was a pene-exclave of France on the south coast of China from 1898, upon its lease to France by Qing China, until its return by France in 1946; its territory included the islands in the bay and land on both banks of the Maxie River, covering 1300 km^{2} of land.
  - Kwantung was a pene-exclave of Russia and later Japan in the southern part of the Liaodong Peninsula in Manchuria that existed from 1898 to 1945 and included the ports of Port Arthur (or Ryojun) and Dal'niy (or Dairen), the latter founded in 1899. It was leased to Russia from 1898 until 1905, when Japan replaced Russia as leaseholder. After World War II, the Soviet Union occupied the territory in 1945, jointly administering it with the Chinese before turning it over to the People's Republic of China in 1955.
  - Jinzhou walled central city remained an enclave of Chinese territory within Kwantung under the lease with Russia. This provision was substantially ignored by Japan after it replaced Russia.
  - Jiangxi, officially the Chinese Soviet Republic (CSR), was an unrecognised proto-state within the territory of China's Jiangxi (Kiangsi) province. The state was proclaimed on 7 November 1931 by future Chinese Communist Party leaders and comprised discontiguous territories that included 18 provinces and 4 counties under CSR control within areas controlled by the Nationalist government.
  - Macao was a pene-exclave of Portugal on the coast of the South China Sea from 1557 until 1999.
  - Zhongshan Dao island in the Pearl River Delta was divided between China and Macao as a pair of pene-exclaves dating from ratification of the Treaty of Tientsin in 1862 through the 1999 return of Macao to China.
  - Qingdao, with an area of 552 km^{2}, was a pene-exclave of Germany (also known as the Kiautschou Bay concession), and later Japan, from 1898 to 1922, adjacent to Jiaozhou Bay on the southern coast of the Shandong Peninsula in East China. The village of Qingdao became the German colony of Tsingtau. In 1914, with the outbreak of World War I, the Republic of China canceled the lease with Germany. Japan then occupied the city and province until December 1922, when it reverted to Chinese rule.
  - Shanghai was the location of British (from 1846) and American (from 1848) Concessions (later Shanghai International Settlement from 1863 to 1943) and the Shanghai French Concession from 1849 to 1946. Unlike the British sovereign colonies of Hong Kong Island and Wei-hai-wei, these foreign concessions always remained Chinese sovereign territory.
  - Wei-hai-wei was a pene-exclave of the United Kingdom that bordered the Yellow Sea in eastern Shantung province of China. The city was a British colony, known also as the Weihai Garrison and sometimes as Port Edward, from 1898 to 1 October 1930, when it was returned to China. Its current name is Weihai.
  - Wei-hai-wei walled central city was excluded from the leased territory and remained an enclave of Chinese territory within Wei-hai-wei.
- France:
  - The island of Mont-Saint-Michel at the mouth of the Couesnon River prior to 1879 was a pene-exclave of Normandy, but only during low tide, when it was connected by a tidal causeway to the neighbouring coast. The raised causeway that was then built was replaced with a light bridge opened in 2014, thus making Mont-Saint-Michel an island again.
  - Saint Pierre and Miquelon, a French territorial collectivity, was completely surrounded from 1763 until 1992 by the waters of Canada (what would otherwise today be considered Canada's contiguous zone), when an EEZ corridor 10.5 NM (19.4 km) wide was created, stretching 200 NM (370 km) to the south, terminating within and surrounded by Canada's EEZ.
- Germany
  - East Prussia (1919–1939), a large German semi-exclave during the Weimar Republic, was separated from Germany after World War I, when Poland regained access to the Baltic Sea (Polish corridor). The territory of East Prussia (essentially the old Duchy of Prussia) is now divided into Kaliningrad Oblast in Russia, the Warmian-Masurian Voivodship in Poland, and Klaipėda County in Lithuania.
  - Hemmeres, (1922–1949), surrounded by Belgian territory, was the sixth and southernmost of the Vennbahn enclaves created in 1922; it contained five households. The railway suffered severe damage during World War II and was not rebuilt. It ceased being an enclave when Belgium annexed the entirety in 1949. Hemmeres was reintegrated into West Germany on 28 August 1958, by an agreement with Belgium.
  - Jestetten is a German town in the district of Waldshut in Baden-Württemberg that was inaccessible except by travelling through Switzerland, until a connecting road was constructed.
  - Roetgener Wald was two enclaves from 1949 to 1958. Unlike its present configuration, the German enclave in 1922 was smaller in area because the central portion (between Grenzweg and a boundary with three turning points west of the Schleebach stream) was Belgian territory. Because the road connecting the two outer German portions (Highways 258/399) was German territory until 1949, the German land formed one enclave. The intersecting north–south road from Fringshaus to Konzen (now Highway B258, which has no connection to the Belgian road network) was also part of the oddly shaped enclave. In 1949 Belgium annexed these roads, thus separating the enclave into two enclaves for the next nine years. In 1958 Belgium ceded the center section of territory to West Germany, in addition to returning the adjacent east–west connecting road. This created one larger enclave in its present form. Highway B258 is the only portion of land that, once having been a part of the Roetgener Wald enclave, is now not within the enclave.
  - Selfkant: Between 1963 and 2002, the N274 road between Roermond and Heerlen, which was part of sovereign Dutch territory, passed through the German Selfkant, which had been annexed by the Netherlands in 1949. Selfkant, except for the road, was returned to Germany in 1963. Until the road was also returned to Germany in 2002, the western portion of Selfkant was an exclave of Germany.
  - Verenahof was a German exclave within Switzerland until 1967, at which time its border became attached to Germany through a treaty implementing a land swap of a total of just under 1.06 km^{2} in equal shares.
  - West Berlin, upon the division of Berlin after World War II and before the reunification of Germany in 1990, was de facto a West German exclave within East Germany. Twelve small West Berlin land areas, such as Steinstücken, were in turn separated from the main body of West Berlin, some by only a few metres. In addition, there were several small areas of East Berlin that were surrounded by West Berlin. All of Berlin was ruled "de jure" by the four Allied powers; this meant that West Berlin could not send voting members to the German Parliament and that its citizens were exempt from conscription. West Berlin exclaves were:
    - Böttcherberg (N) (1949–1971) to East Germany
    - Böttcherberg (SE) (1949–1971) to East Germany
    - Böttcherberg (SW) (1949–1971) to East Germany
    - Erlengrund (1949–1988) land connection to West Berlin established
    - Falkenhagener Wiese (1949–1971) to East Germany
    - Fichtewiese (1949–1988) land connection to West Berlin established
    - Finkenkrug (1949–1971) inhabited, to East Germany
    - Große Kuhlake (1949–1971) to East Germany
    - Laßzins-Wiesen (1949–1988) to East Germany
    - Nuthewiesen (1949–1971) to East Germany
    - Steinstücken (1949–1971) inhabited, land connection to West Berlin established
    - Wüste Mark (1949–1988) to East Germany
  - East Berlin exclaves:
    - Eiskeller (E) (1949–1990) dis-enclaved at re-unification
    - Eiskeller (N) (1949–1990) dis-enclaved at re-unification
    - Eiskeller (S) (1949–1990) dis-enclaved at re-unification
    - West-Staaken – de jure part of Soviet sector but de facto administered by Spandau Borough in the British sector; seized by East Germany in 1951 and made an exclave of East Berlin's Borough of Mitte, which it remained officially until being incorporated in 1961 by the neighbouring town of Falkensee in non-Berlin East Germany.
- Greece:
  - Despotate of the Morea on the Peloponnesos peninsula of present-day Greece was a geographically detached province of the Byzantine Empire from 1349 to 1460; during much of that time, in addition to the Mediterranean Sea, it was surrounded by "states under Latin rule."
  - During the occupation of Smyrna after World War I, İzmir (known as Smyrna in Greek) and its region were Greek exclaves, not connected to mainland Greece by land.
- Hungary:
  - Between 1412 and 1772, Spiš Castle in Spišské Podhradie was an exclave of the Kingdom of Hungary, surrounded by the Eldership of Spisz.
- India:
  - Dadra and Nagar Haveli were enclaves inland from the Arabian Sea coast covering an area of 487 km^{2}. After invasion by pro-Indian Union forces in 1954, they achieved de facto independence from Portugal. They and three Portuguese pene-exclaves, the city of Goa and the two small coastal exclaves of Daman and Diu, were the last remnants of Portuguese India, which existed from 1505 until military conquest by India on 19 December 1961. (A 1956 map also shows a counter-enclave within Nagar Haveli belonging to Bombay, approximately corresponding to the village of Maghval – this village was not ceded to Portugal because of its inhabitants' caste's sacrosanctity).
  - French India – Pondicherry and the other exclaves of Karaikal, Mahé and Yanaon were absorbed into India de facto in 1954 and de jure in 1962 after the Algerian War. In 1761 the British captured all of them from the French (and also Chandannagar), but the Treaty of Paris (1763) returned them to France. Those possessions passed again to British control before finally being handed over to the French in 1816/1817 under the 1814 Treaty of Paris. Pondicherry, Karaikal, Mahé and Yanaon came to be administered as the Union Territory of Puducherry in 1963. All four are now sub-national ex(en)claves within India.
    - Pondicherry was the site of a trading center set up by the French East India Company in 1674, which eventually became the chief French settlement in India, after passing several times between Dutch, British and French control. It comprised 12 non-contiguous parts: three pene-exclaves on the Bay of Bengal and nine nearby true enclaves. Inside the main Pondicherry exclave was a small counter-enclave belonging to India straddling the Chunnambar River.
    - Mahé (or Mayyazhi), a small (9 km^{2}) town, was a pene-exclave on the Malabar Coast of the Arabian Sea from 1721. Mahé was composed of three non-contiguous parts, including Mahé town and two true enclaves: Cherukallayi and one consisting of Palloor, Chalakkara and Pandakkal.
    - Yanaon (or Yanam), a 30 km^{2} pene-exclave in the delta of Godavari River, nine kilometres from the Coromandel Coast and Bay of Bengal. It was a Dutch colony before France overtook it in 1723 and made it a French colony.
    - Karaikal was a small coastal pene-exclave on the Bay of Bengal acquired by France in 1739 from the regime of Raja Pratap Singh of Tanjore. By 1760 it included 81 villages around Karaikal town.
    - Chandannagar was a small true enclave established as a French colony in 1673, located on the right bank of the Hooghly River 30 kilometres north of Kolkata. Bengal was then a province of the Mughal Empire. The British returned the city to France in 1816, along with a 7.8 km^{2} nearby enclave. In May 1950, with French approval, India assumed de facto control, with the de jure transfer in June 1952. In 1955 it was integrated into West Bengal state.
    - Trincomalee was in present-day Sri Lanka (then a part of India) located on the Indian Ocean east coast of the island. By September 1782 it was occupied by the French after the Battle of Trincomalee with the British, only to be ceded back to the British in 1783.
- Israel:
  - Mount Scopus (in Jerusalem) was an Israeli exclave in Jordan-controlled East Jerusalem following the 1949 Armistice Agreements, until being reunited with West Jerusalem following the Six-Day War in 1967, though most of the international community does not recognize Israel's claim to the city. Similarly, Ein Gev, located on the eastern shore of the Sea of Galilee, was a pene-exclave in Syria until Israel took over the Golan Heights territory during the Six-Day War.

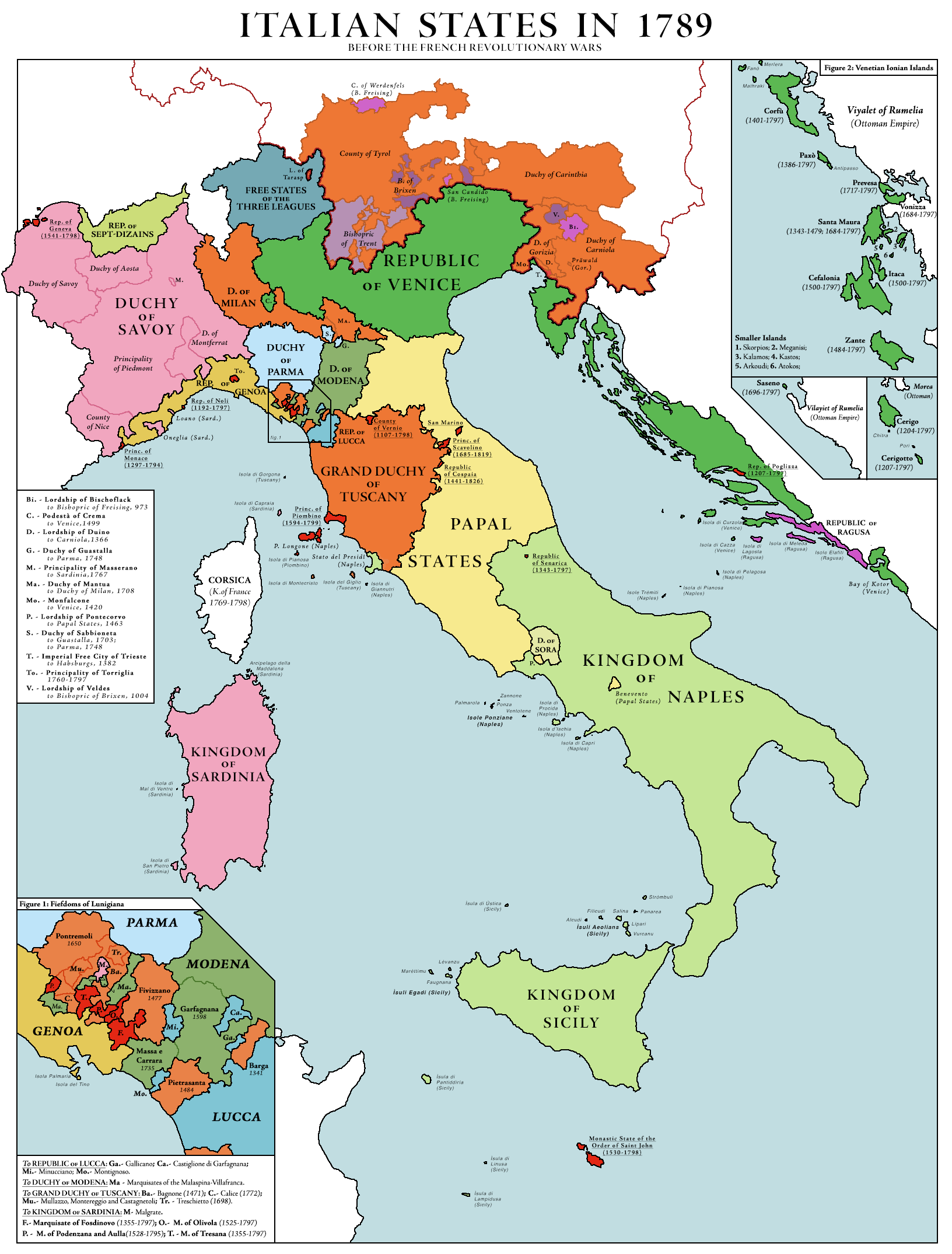
Italy in 1789 before the French Revolutionary Wars

- Italy:
  - In Italy in 1789 before the French Revolutionary Wars, the following states possessed or were true enclaves:
    - Lordship of Tarasp was surrounded by the Free States of the Three Leagues.
    - An exclave of the Republic of Geneva (1541–1798) was surrounded by the Duchy of Savoy.
    - Principality of Torriglia (1760–1797) was surrounded by the Republic of Genoa.
    - Republic of Senarica (1343–1797) was surrounded by the Kingdom of Naples.
- Latvia:
  - The former Rauna Municipality was composed of Drusti parish and Rauna parish, which are non-contiguous. In 2021 Rauna Municipality was merged into Smiltene Municipality.
- Lithuania:
  - Pogiriai (Pogiry) was a Lithuanian exclave of 1.7 km^{2} that was ceded to Belarus in 1996.
- Oman:
  - Gwadar was an Omani pene-exclave on the Arabian Sea coast of present-day Pakistan from 1784 until 1958.
- Pakistan:
  - East Pakistan (1947–1971), was a pene-exclave of Pakistan (if one considers West Pakistan, site of the capital, Islamabad, as the mainland) that bordered the Bay of Bengal, India and Burma. East Pakistan, with a distance of 1,600 km separating it from West Pakistan, accounted for 70% of the country's exports and was more populous than West Pakistan.
- Panama:
  - Colón, an exclave of Panama from 1903 to July 27, 1939, was surrounded by the U.S. Panama Canal Zone, until a treaty provision connected it to the main part of Panama via a corridor.
  - Panama City and the tip of Paitilla Point from 1903 to February 11, 1915, were pene-enclaves surrounded by the U.S. Panama Canal Zone and the Pacific Ocean. Maps of the Canal Zone dated before 1923 clearly show these borders. Maps dated 1924 and later show a changed border that re-connected Panama City with eastern Panama.
  - When Madden Road was ceded to the U.S. by treaty on July 27, 1939, a Vennbahn-type Panamanian enclave was created that was bounded by Madden Road, the main Canal Zone boundary, and a contour line above Rio Chagres and Rio Chilibre. Another treaty that took effect on April 11, 1955, de-enclaved it.
  - Panama had a water enclave in Limon Bay from 1979 to December 31, 1999. It also had jurisdiction over one building within the U.S. Summit Naval Station from October 1991 until the transfer of the station to Panama on December 31, 1999.
- Papal States:
  - Comtat Venaissin was an exclave of Papal territory within France from 1348 to 1791. It contained an enclave of another Papal territory, the city of Avignon, and had a small exclave around the nearby town of Valréas.
  - Pontecorvo and Benevento were exclaves of Papal territory in Southern Italy until 1860 when they were absorbed into the Kingdom of Italy

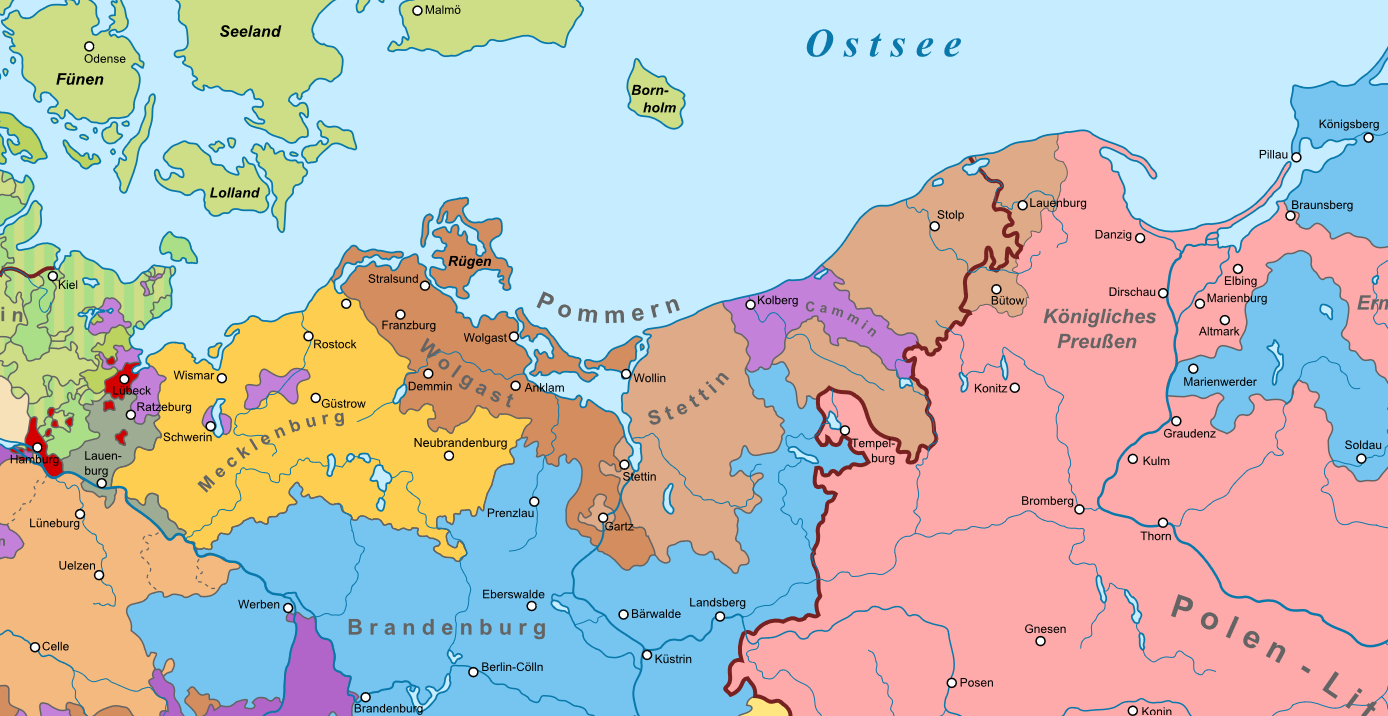
The territory of Duchy of Pomerania-Stettin in 1618, consisting of four exclaves.

- Poland:
  - In the 1280s, the Duchy of Pomerania lost the town of Świdwin, together with the surrounding area, to the Margraviate of Brandenburg. It became a salient of Neumark which, together with the Bishopric of Cammin, separated the southeastern portion of the state from the rest of its territories. Since 1317, it controlled the Lands of Schlawe and Stolp, which were separated from the rest of its territory by the Bishopric of Cammin.
  - From between 1227 and 1233, to between 1248 and 1264, the area around the town of Świecie was an exclave of the Duchy of Gdańsk.
  - The Province of 13 Spisz Towns, located within the Eldership of Spisz, was a territory of the Kingdom of Poland from 1412 (Treaty of Lubowla) to 1569 and the Polish–Lithuanian Commonwealth from 1569 to 1772, formally held as a pawn from the Kingdom of Hungary. It consisted of a salient connected to the rest of the Kingdom of Poland and 5 exclaves. Events of the centuries following the treaty meant these exclaves were variously enclaves of Habsburg Royal Hungary and Ottoman Hungary. The Eldership returned to Hungary (then part of the Habsburg monarchy) in the First Partition of Poland.
  - Between 1772 and 1793, the city of Gdańsk, together with the surrounding area, were an exclave of the Polish–Lithuanian Commonwealth, surrounded by the territory of the Kingdom of Prussia.
  - Westerplatte peninsula was a pene-exclave of Poland in Free City of Danzig from 1920 to 1939, ended its existence after the Battle of Westerplatte and annexation to Germany together with the Polish coast.
  - The Enclave of Police was an enclave within Poland from 5 October 1945 to 25 September 1946 centered around the town of Police. It was a military occupation of the Soviet Union, administered as part of the Randow District, Soviet occupation zone in Germany, though legally not part of its territory.
- Portugal:
  - Fort of São João Baptista de Ajudá was a Portuguese exclave (initially around 1 km^{2} in the area and reduced to only 2 ha by 1961) within Dahomey/Benin from 1680 until 1961 (de facto annexation by Dahomey) or 1975 (Portuguese recognition).
- Slovakia: Part of the settlement Sidónia was once reached by road only from the Czech Republic. After the dissolution of Czechoslovakia at the end of 1992, the new state border was originally along the Vlárka River. Several houses in the central part of the village, inhabited by nine families, stand on the left bank, which fell to Slovakia. On 25 July 1997, the Czech–Slovak state border was modified and the small area on the left bank with a few houses in the centre of Sidónia became part of the Czech Republic (exchanged for the settlement of U Sabotů). The state border has also been drawn since then along the centre of the road from the Vlára Pass.
- Spain:
  - Ifni was a pene-exclave of Spain on the Atlantic coast of Morocco from 1859 to 1969.
- South Africa:
  - Bophuthatswana was a bantustan or "black homeland" that was granted nominal independence by apartheid South Africa from 1977 until being re-absorbed in April 1994, but it remained unrecognised internationally. It consisted of a scattered patchwork of individual enclaves, six that were true enclaves within South Africa and two that bordered Botswana and South Africa.
- Yemen:
  - Cheikh Saïd is a rocky peninsula in present-day Yemen between the Gulf of Aden and the Red Sea. Although as late as 1970, the Petit Larousse described it as having been a "French colony from 1868 to 1936," France never claimed formal jurisdiction or sovereignty over it.
- The southern section of the Emirate of Ras al-Khaimah was a national-level exclave surrounded by other emirates of the UAE and Oman for three months after UAE independence in 1971 until it joined the UAE in 1972.
- Between 1991 and 2003, Russia had three tiny pene-exclaves on tips of the lakeshore that bordered the Lithuanian side of Lake Vištytis. Before a new border treaty went into force on 12 August 2003, the border ran along most of the waterline of the beaches on the Lithuanian side, so anyone paddling in the water was technically crossing into Russia.
- Schirgiswalde – In accordance with terms of the 1635 Peace of Prague, Austria transferred land (Upper and Lower Lusatia) to the Electorate of Saxony, at the time both states of the Holy Roman Empire. However, because of religious affiliation with Austria, Schirgiswalde and five other towns (Günthersdorf, Gerlachsheim, Winkel, Taubentränke and Neuleutersdorf, now part of Leutersdorf) within the transferred land remained with Austria, becoming Austrian enclaves within Saxony. During the Napoleonic Wars, in 1806, the Holy Roman Empire was dissolved and its states became independent. The 1809 Treaty of Schönbrunn mandated the transfer of these six enclaves from what was now the Austrian Empire to the Kingdom of Saxony. However, the transfer did not occur until 1845 because of the need to correct mistakes in the names of the villages stated in the treaty and subsequent neglect. During that time, Schirgiswalde was de facto independent until economic reasons compelled the final transfer of the enclaves, thus extinguishing them. In 1815 Lower and part of Upper Lusatia, along with some of these enclaves, had become part of the Kingdom of Prussia by the Final Act of the Congress of Vienna.
- Sikkim – Dopta and Chumbi were exclaves of Sikkim within Tibet until China occupied them in 1958.
- Sweden – The Peace of Westphalia in 1648 granted certain possessions of the Holy Roman Empire to the Swedish Empire (extant 1611–1721) to be held as fiefs of the Holy Roman Empire:

- Bremen-Verden – states of the Holy Roman Empire bordering the North Sea; in "personal union with Sweden" until 1712, when they fell under Danish occupation in wartime.
- Swedish Pomerania – a state on the Baltic coast in present-day Germany and Poland; a small part was ceded to Prussia following war in 1720 and the entirety in 1815 during the Congress of Vienna.
- town of Wismar – town in northern Germany on the Baltic Sea; transferred to Germany in 1903 when Sweden renounced its claim.

Map of the heavily partitioned black homelands in South Africa at the end of apartheid in 1994

- Syria was a pene-exclave of the United Arab Republic from 1958 to 1961 (if one considers Egypt as the UAR main land), bordering the Mediterranean Sea, Turkey, Iraq, Lebanon, Israel and Jordan.
- Transkei was a bantustan or "black homeland" that was granted nominal independence by apartheid South Africa from 1976 until being re-absorbed in April 1994, but it remained unrecognised internationally. It had two exclaves within South Africa that were true enclaves.
- Taebong and Goryeo – The southwest coast of South Jeolla Province in Korea was an exclave of Taebong or Goryeo, between 903 and 936.
- Turkey –

- The tomb of Suleyman Shah (b. ca. 1178–d. 1236) was located in or near Qal'at Ja'bar in modern-day Syria; in accordance with the 1921 Treaty of Ankara, the tomb "shall remain, with its appurtenances, the property of Turkey, who may appoint guardians for it and may hoist the Turkish flag there." The treaty is silent regarding sovereignty of the 6.3 hectares of land where the tomb rests. The tomb was relocated in 1973 prior to the creation of Euphrates Lake.
- Ada Kaleh – Prior to the creation of modern Turkey, the Ottoman Empire de jure held a small island in the Danube River surrounded by the waters of Romania (which de facto controlled the island), from the Berlin Treaty of 1878 until 1923 when, under the Treaty of Lausanne, Romania obtained formal sovereignty over it. It was submerged in 1970 by the construction of a hydroelectric plant, displacing up to 1000 residents.

- United Kingdom –

- Following the establishment of the Irish Free State, three deep water Treaty Ports at Berehaven, Queenstown (modern Cobh) and Lough Swilly were retained by the United Kingdom in accordance with the Anglo-Irish Treaty of 6 December 1921. As part of the settlement of the Anglo-Irish Trade War in the 1930s, the ports were transferred to Ireland (the Free State's successor) in 1938 following agreements reached between the British and Irish Governments.
- In 1625, King Charles I instituted the Order of the Baronets of Nova Scotia in an effort to colonize New Scotland, by offering the hereditary title, land ownership and power over new baronetcies in exchange for financing and materially supporting new settlements. Under Scots Law, Baronets "took seisin" by receiving symbolic "earth and stone" on the actual land, which was the feudal legal form of taking possession. However, to avoid a trans-Atlantic trip (and thus encourage applicants), the royal charter stated that "the realm of Nova Scotia, and original infeftment thereof, is holden of the kingdom of Scotland, and forms part of the County of Edinburgh." By royal decree, land in the courtyard at Edinburgh Castle was declared to be an integral part of Nova Scotia; thus, seisin at the castle was equivalent to seisin on the lands themselves. The ceremony of seisin was performed in the following years for 64 of the original Baronets. This decree has never been annulled, which fuels a belief that this enclave still exists as a tiny enclave of Canada within the grounds of the famous Scottish castle.

- United States –

- Horseshoe Reef (1850–1908) in Lake Erie consisted of underwater ledges of sunken rock near Buffalo, New York. Great Britain ceded a fraction of an acre of underwater land that was entirely surrounded by Canadian waters to the United States to construct a lighthouse. A 1908 treaty mandated a new survey in order to shift the boundary to include the reef in U.S. waters.
- The Captain Cook Monument at Kealakekua Bay and about 25 square feet (2.3 m^{2}) of land around it in Hawaii, United States, the place where James Cook was killed in 1779, is owned by the United Kingdom. An historian on the occasion of the 50th anniversary recorded in 1928 that the white stone "obelisk monument [was] erected to the memory of Captain Cook, about 1876, and on land deeded outright to the British Government by Princess Likelike, sister of King Kalakaua, about the same year, so that that square is absolute British Territory." Hawaii was a sovereign nation at the time. According to a recent writer, "The land under the monument was deeded to the United Kingdom in 1877 and is considered as sovereign non-embassy land owned by the British Embassy in Washington DC. ... the Hawaiian State Parks agency maintained that as sovereign British territory it was the responsibility of the UK to maintain the site."
- Lake of the Woods – the American border with present-day Canada as defined under the 1783 Treaty of Paris and the Anglo-American Convention of 1818 inadvertently created two small maritime exclaves of the U.S. in Angle Inlet. The border depended on determining the northwesternmost point of the Lake of the Woods. Johann Tiarks' survey in 1825 placed its location at the edge of a pond on the Angle Inlet. (A 1940 academic study documented the location of Tiarks' point, which is in the immediate vicinity of 49°23′51.324″N 95°9′12.20783″W (NAD83).) In accordance with the 1818 treaty, the border ran south from this point to the 49th parallel. However, this line was "intersected at five points by the winding course of the boundary in the channel of the Northwest Angle Inlet; thus there were anomalously left two small areas of waters totaling two and a half acres belonging to the United States, yet entirely surrounded by Canadian waters." They were centered at 49°23′10.7514″N 95°09′10.8″W and 49°23′17.5914″N 95°09′11.6994″W. By treaty in 1925, the southernmost of these five intersecting points, 4785 ft. farther south than Tiarks' point, was adopted instead, which eliminated these exclaves.
- Panama Canal Zone, surrounded by Panama, the Caribbean Sea and the Pacific Ocean, was an American pene-exclave from 1903 to 1 October 1979, when the entity was extinguished by treaty with Panama. After that date, the former Canal Zone land remaining under U.S. sovereignty, greatly reduced in area, was a pene-exclave until 31 December 1999, when total transfer to Panama was complete.
- At El Cerro de Doscientos Pies ("200-Foot Hill"), 3.19 hectares of land in Panama near Las Minas Bay were annexed by the U.S. on 24 September 1928 and added to the Canal Zone. This true enclave apparently existed until 1 October 1979.
- On 1 October 1979, the day the Panama Canal Treaty of 1977 took effect, most of the land within the former Canal Zone transferred to Panama. However, the treaty set aside many Canal Zone areas and facilities for transfer during the following 20 years. The treaty specifically categorized areas and facilities by name as "Military Areas of Coordination", "Defense Sites" and "Areas Subject to Separate Bilateral Agreement". These were to be transferred by the U.S. to Panama during certain time windows or simply by the end of the 243-month treaty period. On 1 October 1979, among the many such parcels so designated in the treaty, 35 emerged as true enclaves (surrounded entirely by land solely under Panamanian jurisdiction). In later years as other areas were turned over to Panama, nine more true enclaves emerged. Of these 44 true enclaves, 14 were related to military logistics, 7 were military communications sites, 5 Federal Aviation Administration facilities, 5 military housing enclaves, 3 military base areas, 2 military research facilities, 2 parts of a bombing range, 4 secondary school parcels, 1 elementary school, and 1 hospital. At least 13 other parcels each were enclosed partly by land under the absolute jurisdiction of Panama and partly by an "Area of Civil Coordination" (housing), which under the treaty was subject to elements of both U.S. and Panamanian public law. In addition, the 1977 treaty designated numerous areas and individual facilities as "Canal Operating Areas" for joint U.S.-Panama ongoing operations by a commission. On the effective date of the treaty, many of these Canal Operating Areas, including Madden Dam, became newly surrounded by the territory of Panama. Just after noon local time on 31 December 1999, all former Canal Zone parcels of all types had come under the exclusive jurisdiction of Panama.

- The Val d'Aran is a valley in the Pyrenees mountains and a comarca in northwestern Catalonia, northern Spain. Most of it comprises the only part of Catalonia that is on the northern side of the Pyrenees. The Val d'Aran had been without direct access to the south side of the mountains, until the Vielha tunnel was opened in 1948.
- Venda was a bantustan or "black homeland" that was granted nominal independence by apartheid South Africa from 1979 until being re-absorbed in April 1994, but it remained unrecognised internationally. It was an enclave that was not an exclave, bordering only South Africa and separated narrowly from Zimbabwe by the Madimbo corridor to the north. Venda itself also had a small exclave that was a true enclave in South Africa.
- Walvis Bay was a South African pene-exclave bordered by the Atlantic Ocean and Namibia, before being incorporated with Namibia in 1994, four years after that country's independence.
- Zadar (Zara) was a 104 km^{2} pene-exclave of Italy, bordering the Adriatic Sea and Croatia, from 1920 to 1944 (de facto due to abandonment by the Italian civilian administration) or 1947 (de jure under treaty).
- Various other historical foreign concessions
- Innumerable medieval enclaves within Europe

=== Subnational historic enclaves and exclaves ===
- Austria-Hungary – The former Kingdom of Dalmatia was an exclave of Cisleithania.
- Azerbaijan – The former Nagorno-Karabakh Autonomous Oblast was an enclave in Azerbaijan.
- In Canada, East York became an exclave of York in 1922, when the township of North York was established, causing East York to be sandwiched between North York, Leaside, and Old Toronto. East York became its own township in 1924, ending its status as an exclave. All of these municipalities are part of Toronto since the 1998 amalgamation.
- In Central Finland, the former municipality of Säynätsalo was an exclave of the city of Jyväskylä from 1993 to 2009.
- Denmark
  - A number of enclaves of the Kingdom of Denmark in the Duchy of Slesvig existed until 1864.
  - The municipality og Glostrup had an exclave consisting of Avedøre until it was transferred to Hvidovre municipality in 1974.
- Germany –
  - The Palatinate was an exclave of Bavaria until the end of the Weimar republic
  - The former municipality of Hinterhermsdorf in Saxony was an exclave of the town of Sebnitz, being separated from it by the municipality of Kirnitzschtal, until Kirnitzschtal also became a part of Sebnitz.
  - The former Prussian province Hohenzollern was an exclave in present-day Baden-Württemberg, being surrounded by the Grand Duchy, later Republic of Baden and the Kingdom, later Free People's State of Württemberg.
  - Königsberg, located in the Lower Franconia region of present-day Bavaria, was an enclave within that state, along with two small nearby enclaves, belonging to the Ernestine Duchy of Saxe-Coburg and Gotha (which after 1825 also had five exclaves in Thuringia). In 1918 the post-monarchy duchy was split into two states, making Königsberg an exclave of the Free State of Saxe-Coburg. In 1920, the residents of that state voted to merge with the Free State of Bavaria, thus eliminating the three Bavarian enclaves.
  - Schmalkalden and Suhl – this Prussian exclave was made up of two parts which together formed a composite exclave. Landkreis Herrschaft Schmalkalden was an exclave of the province of Hesse-Nassau and Regierungsbezirk Kassel. It had previously been an exclave of the Electorate of Hesse (the Lordship of Schmalkalden) until its annexation by Prussia in 1866. Schmalkalden itself also had a small exclave: Barchfeld (now part of Barchfeld-Immelborn). Kreis Schleusingen (Suhl) was an exclave of the Province of Saxony and Regierungsbezirk Erfurt. In 1920, shortly after World War 1, the Thuringian states unified into a single state, making the two territories a composite enclave of the new State of Thuringia. Both of these exclaves, and thus also the composite enclave, ceased to exist in 1944 when they were transferred to Thuringia.
  - Kreis Ziegenrück was a collection of exclaves of Prussia, of the Province of Saxony and of Regierungsbezirk Erfurt. Gefell was an enclave of Reuss-Gera while Blintendorf was a condominium with it. Most of these became enclaves of Thuringia upon its formation in 1920, but Blankenberg and Sparnberg also shared their southern border with Bavaria. Ziegenrück passed to Thuringia in 1944.
  - The Principality of Waldeck-Pyrmont consisted of two detached parts. Waldeck was enclaved entirely by Prussia, lying between Hesse-Nassau and Westphalia. Pyrmont lay between the Duchy of Brunswick, two separate parts of the Prussian Province of Hanover, an exclave of Westphalia (Lügde) and the Principality of Lippe.
  - The two parts of the former County of Schaumburg:
    - When the county of Schaumburg was partitioned in 1640 one part became an exclave of the Landgraviate of Hesse-Kassel, which later became the Electorate of Hesse. When the Electorate of Hesse was annexed by Prussia in 1866 this became an exclave of Hesse-Nassau as Kreis Rinteln, later renamed Kreis Grafschaft Schaumburg.
    - Following Prussia's annexation of the Kingdom of Hanover and Electorate of Hesse the Principality of Schaumburg-Lippe became an enclave of Prussia, lying between the Hessian part (i.e. Hesse-Nassau), Hanover and Westphalia.
  - Saxe-Altenburg was separated into two areas, the Ostkreis and Westkreis.
  - The Grand Duchy of Oldenburg (Free State of Oldenburg from 1918) had two substantial exclaves:
    - The Principality of Lübeck (Region of Lübeck after 1919), centred on Eutin, was located between the Free City of Lübeck and the Prussian Province of Schleswig-Holstein. Until 1867 (Treaty of Kiel), when Prussia ceded Ahrensbök to it, it consisted of two detached parts. It became part of Schleswig-Holstein in the 1937 Greater Hamburg Act.
    - The Principality of Birkenfeld (Region of Birkenfeld from 1919). Following the Congress of Vienna in 1815 Birkenfeld bordered several territories – the Prussian Grand Duchy of the Lower Rhine (Rhine Province from 1822), the Saxe-Coburg-Saalfeld exclave Principality of Lichtenberg and the Hesse-Homburg Meisenheim exclave. Lichtenberg was sold to Prussia in 1834. When Meisenheim was annexed by Prussia in 1866 Birkenfeld became an enclave of Prussia, the Rhine Province and Regierungsbezirk Trier. It became part of the Rhine Province in the 1937 Greater Hamburg Act.
  - The Duchy of Anhalt was composed of several detached parts. The main part and most of its small exclaves were entirely enclaved by Prussia. Its second-largest part had a short border with one of the detached parts of the Duchy of Brunswick. Its main territory also enclosed several small Prussian exclaves.
  - The Duchy of Brunswick was composed of several detached parts. Its core territory and most of its small exclaves were entirely enclaved by Prussia. Its second-largest territory had a short border with Pyrmont (an exclave of Waldeck and Pyrmont) and also enclaved Bodenwerder and Pegestorf, which formed an exclave of the Prussian Province of Hanover. Another part had a short border with a detached part of Anhalt.
  - Innumerable medieval and early-modern enclaves.
  - The Free Cities of Hamburg and Lübeck both had numerous small exclaves. In the 1937 Greater Hamburg Act Hamburg gained substantial territory in its vicinity which connected most of its exclaves to the city proper while Geesthacht and the more distant Landherrenschaft Ritzebüttel (Cuxhaven) were annexed to Schleswig-Holstein and Hanover respectively; Lübeck was dissolved and mostly absorbed into Schleswig-Holstein.
  - The Principality of Ratzeburg, centered on Schönberg, was an exclave of the Grand Duchy of Mecklenburg-Strelitz and its successor the Free State of Mecklenburg-Strelitz until it was merged with Mecklenburg-Schwerin in 1934.
  - Kreis Wetzlar was an exclave of the Rhine Province. Until 1866 it lay between the Grand Duchy of Hesse and the Duchy of Nassau and so was also an exclave of Prussia. In 1866 Nassau and part of the Grand Duchy of Hesse were annexed by Prussia, becoming part of Hesse-Nassau so it was no longer a Prussian exclave but remained an exclave of the Rhine Province until 1932. Wetzlar itself had an exclave separated from the main territory by at thin sliver of land along the road between Heuchelheim and Rodheim (Biebertal). Prior to 1866 this connected the Hessian Kreis Biedenkopf to the rest of Upper Hesse, forming a large salient; after 1866 Biedenkopf was part of Hesse-Nassau.
  - The Province of Upper Hesse was a large exclave of the Grand Duchy of Hesse. From 1866 it was also an enclave of Prussia, being surrounded by Hesse-Nassau and the Wetzlar exclave of the Rhine Province
- In India, until 1952, France maintained Chandannagar, which reported to the Governor of Pondichéry, and was an enclave in Bengal, just upriver from Calcutta.
- In Indonesia:
  - Special Capital Region of Jakarta was a coastal enclave surrounded by West Java and Java Sea until 2000, when the neighbouring Banten became a new province.
  - Bandung city in West Java was an enclave surrounded by Bandung Regency until 1976, when the adjacent Cimahi became an administrative city.
  - Bandar Lampung city in Lampung province was a coastal enclave surrounded by South Lampung Regency until 2007, when Pesawaran became a new regency.
- In Ireland:
  - Until 1842, Durrow was an exclave of County Kilkenny surrounded by Queen's County.
  - Until 1836, Ballymore Eustace and two other smaller pockets of land were exclaves of County Dublin, surrounded by County Kildare.
  - Formerly, a tiny portion of County Kerry, known as the "East Fractions," (including the village of Ballydaly) was surrounded by County Cork; the East Fractions were transferred to County Cork in 1843.
- In Korea:

- Siheung County, South Korea, had an exclave (nowadays Gwacheon, Gunpo, and Uiwang) since Anyang was separated from Siheung in 1973. In 1989, the old county of Siheung was divided into the cities of Gunpo, Uiwang, and Siheung, thereby dissolving the enclave.
- Seoul was an enclave of Gyeonggi Province until neighbouring Incheon was declared a special city in 1981.

- In Poland:

- From 1345 to 1351, the Duchy of Wizna, a fiefdom within the United Kingdom of Poland, was a duchy with a personal union with the Duchy of Płock, forming the royal domain of duke Bolesław III of Płock. Both duchies were separated from each other by the Duchy of Warsaw.
- Between 1412 and 1778, the Spiskie Podgrodzie District, the district within the Province of 13 Szepes Towns, Eldership of Spisz, Poland, consisted of two enclaves, of areas of Spišské Podhradie and Spišské Vlachy. The two enclaves were separated from each other, and the rest of Polish territory, by the Kingdom of Hungary.
- From 1434 to 1772, the Chełm Land was an exclave of the Ruthenian Voivodeship, within the Kingdom of Poland.
- From 1585 to 1620, the District of Pilten, an autonomous region within the Polish–Lithuanian Commonwealth, was an area composed of three exclaves separated from each other by the Duchy of Courland and Semigallia. The southeastern enclave bordered the Duchy of Samogitia, other region in the Polish–Lithuanian Commonwealth, while the two other exclaves, had access to the Baltic Sea. Until 1620, it was an exclave of the Duchy of Livonia, and from 1598 to 1620, it was part of smaller subdivision of Wenden Voivodeship. From 1621 to 1772, it was an exclave within the Inflanty Voivodeship.
- In the 18th century, the town of Bielino was composed of two rectangular strips of land, both located about 1 km (0.62 miles) apart from each other, and with other towns located between them. The northern area was established in 1757, and the southern, in 1766. The town formally existed until it was incorporated into the city of Warsaw in 1794.
- From 14 August 1919 to 28 September 1939, the city of Warsaw was an independent city with voivodeship status, surrounded by the Warsaw Voivodeship.
- From 1944 to 1975, Poland at various times had from one to five independent cities with voivodeship status. Warsaw was surrounded by Warsaw Voivodeship from 22 June 1944 to 31 May 1975, and Łódź was surrounded by Łódź Voivodeship from 18 August 1945 to 31 May 1975. From 1 January 1957 to 31 May 1975, another three cities held voivodeship status. They were Kraków surrounded by Kraków Voivodeship, Poznań surrounded by Poznań Voivodeship, and Wrocław surrounded by Wrocław Voivodeship. Additionally, Poznań was surrounded by Poznań County.
- From 1 June 1975 to 31 December 1998, the village of Zabieżki was an exclave of Warsaw Voivodeship surrounded by the Siedlce Voivodeship.
- From 1 January 2010 to 31 December 2012, the town of Tychowo, located in the municipality of Tychowo in Białogard County, West Pomeranian Voivodeship, consisted of 10 exclaves separated, sometimes by the width of a street, and surrounded by the rural area of the municipality. Additionally, there was one small exclave of the rural area surrounded by the city. The boundaries were changed on 1 January 2013 to extinguish the exclaves.

- In Portugal until 2013, two civil parishes comprised the city of Estremoz. The parish of Santa Maria (the new town and its rural environs) surrounded an enclave, the walled old town of the parish of Santo Andre. The citadel inside Santo Andre was also a counter-enclave that belonged to Santa Maria. The two parishes were united to form a new parish called Union of the Parishes of Estremoz (Santa Maria and Santo André), thus ending the only counter-enclave in Portugal.
- In Russia:
  - Sheremetyevo is the location of the primary airport for Moscow. From 1995 to 2011 it was officially an enclave of the city of Moscow, but there was ambiguity regarding its association with Moscow Oblast. In 2011, the enclave was returned to Moscow Oblast, thus extinguishing it.
  - Vnukovo consisted of two enclaves of the city of Moscow to its southwest. On 1 July 2012, "New Moscow" was created by annexing additional land to the city, including the land that surrounded Vnukovo. The two are now exclaves of a Moscow city subdivision, and one is also an enclave.
  - Ust-Orda Buryat Autonomous Okrug was an enclave (not exclave) within Irkutsk Oblast and was merged into it on 1 January 2008.
  - Agin-Buryat Autonomous Okrug was an enclave (not exclave) within Zabaykalsky Krai and was merged into it on 3 January 2008.
- In South Africa, the Eastern Cape Province had an exclave that was surrounded by KwaZulu-Natal Province, containing the town of Umzimkulu. KwaZulu-Natal had an exclave, Mount Currie, that was surrounded by the Eastern Cape. Both were extinguished in 2006.
- Switzerland –
  - The village of Samnaun could initially only be reached by road from Austria. Thus, in 1892 the village was excluded from the Swiss customs territory. The exemption was maintained even when a road was built to the Engadin valley in 1907–1912.
  - Before 1597, the two present-day cantons of Appenzell Ausserrhoden and Appenzell Innerrhoden were one canton, Appenzell, which was an enclave completely surrounded by the Canton of St. Gallen.
  - The secession of the new canton of Jura in 1979 left Bern temporarily with an exclave, Laufental, bounded by Jura, Solothurn, Basel-Landschaft, and France. Laufental joined Basel-Landschaft in 1994.
  - The village of Clavaleyres was an exclave of Bern surrounded by Fribourg and Vaud until it merged with Murten in the Canton of Fribourg on 1 January 2022.
- Turkey –

- Yalova was an exclave of Istanbul until it gained provincial status in 1995.
- The Istanbul boroughs of Maslak, Ayazağa, and Huzur (part of Ayazağa until 1989) together formed an exclave of Şişli district after the split of Kağıthane from Şişli resulting from a law passed by TBMM on 19 June 1987. They were surrounded by Sarıyer to the north and east, Beşiktaş to the southeast, Kağıthane to the southwest, and Eyüp to the west. Finally, they were given to the district of Sarıyer after passing a law on 12 November 2012. Note that Maslak and Ayazağa were part of Sarıyer between 1930 and 1954 before passing to Şişli due to the split of Şişli from Beyoğlu in 1954.

- United Kingdom –
  - Cumbernauld and Kirkintilloch formed an exclave at county level, as a part of the Scottish county of Dunbartonshire sandwiched between Stirlingshire and Lanarkshire. The exclave was dissolved after the municipal reforms of 1975.
  - Ardnamurchan, Morvern and the surrounding area also formed an exclave at county level, as a part of the Scottish county of Argyllshire bordered by Inverness-shire, separated from the rest of Argyllshire by Loch Linnhe. The exclave was dissolved in 1975 following the municipal reforms of that year.
  - Dudley in the West Midlands, England, was an exclave at municipal level, being in a part of the county of Worcestershire surrounded by Staffordshire. Upon the local government reforms of 1974, the exclave was dissolved.
  - Furness in England was an exclave of the county of Lancashire, known as "Lancashire-beyond-the-Sands" until 1974, when it became part of Cumbria.
  - Tetworth, historically part of Huntingdonshire, included an exclave at county level, as part of Huntingdonshire separated from the rest of the county by Cambridgeshire. The exclave was dissolved in 1974, when the whole of Huntingdonshire became part of Cambridgeshire.
  - Flintshire in Wales had, until its abolition in 1974, two exclaves: Marford and Hoseley and Maelor Saesneg (or English Maelor). The former was an enclave of Denbighshire; the latter bordered Denbighshire to the north-west, Shropshire to the south and Cheshire to the north-east. In 1974 they became part of Wrexham Maelor; today they are part of Wrexham.
  - Domesday Hundreds of Cheshire map in 1086 displays an enclave of Hamestan surrounded entirely by Middlewich.
  - The counties of Scotland before reorganisation in 1889 included dozens of exclaves. This was especially notable in the case of Cromartyshire, which was split into at least nine parts spread across Ross-shire.
  - Wales once had a third-order sub-national semi-exclave of its county of Caernarfonshire. This county had a semi-exclave consisting of the parishes of Llysfaen and Eirias and including the town of Old Colwyn, which was transferred to the surrounding county of Denbighshire in 1923. In turn it surrounded a counter-semi-exclave of Denbighshire including the east part of Old Colwyn, which had very complex borders. This counter-semi-exclave in turn contained a counter-counter-semi-exclave of Caernarvonshire, that of "Coed-coch Cottage" covering 1.6 acres (0.65 ha). The counter-semi-exclave was annexed to the semi-exclave in 1879.
  - Before 1974, and especially before 1844, there were many exclaves of counties in England and Wales.
- United States –

- Maine was a pene-exclave of Massachusetts between 1652 and 1820.
- The Western Reserve in present-day Ohio was a pene-exclave of Connecticut from 13 September 1786 to 1800, when it reverted to the Northwest Territory.
- The following from pre-merger Louisville, Kentucky, no longer exist as enclaves: Audubon Park, Meadowview Estates, Parkway Village, Seneca Gardens, Wellington, and the combination of Kingsley, Strathmoor Manor, and Strathmoor Village.
- District of Columbia – Washington National Airport was built on reclaimed land on the south side of the Potomac River, where the river's high-water line marked the District's boundary with Virginia. Therefore, until 1945, the site was a pene-exclave of the District. Since then, the airport has been officially deemed a part of Arlington County, Virginia, but it is under exclusive federal jurisdiction and is administered as if still part of the District.
- Boston Corner was a pene-exclave of the town of Mount Washington, Massachusetts, and ceded to New York on January 11, 1855, because its geographical isolation from the rest of Massachusetts (as part of the Taconic range) made maintaining law and order difficult.
- Princeton Township surrounded the Borough of Princeton, home of Princeton University, until the two municipalities merged in 2013 to form Princeton, New Jersey.
- Town Line, New York voted 85 to 40 to secede from the United States in 1861, with no legal effect and no well-defined borders, to become an exclave of the Confederate States of America, unrecognized by either side (there are no written records); ceremonially voted to "rejoin" the Union in 1946.

- In France, in Côtes-d'Armor département, the former commune of Plessix-Balisson is surrounded by the former commune of Ploubalay. In 2017, both communes were merged into the new Beaussais-sur-Mer commune.

=== Temporary enclaves or exclaves ===
Sometimes land is ceded temporarily to another country as a form of legal fiction.

- Suite 212 at Claridges Hotel in London was ceded by the United Kingdom to Yugoslavia on 17 June 1945 to allow Crown Prince Alexander, whose parents were in exile, to be born on Yugoslav soil, though the story may be apocryphal, as there exists no documentary record of this.
- To establish jurisdiction, Camp Zeist, a former United States Air Force base in the Netherlands, was, in 2000, temporarily declared sovereign territory of the United Kingdom, in order to allow the Pan Am Flight 103 bombing trial to take place.
- In 1943, the maternity ward at the Ottawa Civic Hospital in Canada was temporarily extraterritorial so that Princess Juliana's daughter Princess Margriet would only have Dutch (by parents' nationality) and not dual nationality, because of her potential birth on Canadian soil. Dual nationality would have excluded her from the royal succession.
- In 1979, at Sender Zehlendorf, East Germany, an area of 300 metres in radius around a radio tower construction site was made an exclave of the Soviet Union. After a Soviet fighter plane had earlier collided with a radio transmission mast at the facility, causing it to collapse, the Soviet Union agreed to rebuild the mast. So that the stricter German safety regulations would not slow the construction progress, the area was declared a Soviet exclave for the duration of the work.

== Potential exclaves pending international resolution ==
- Crimea – after the 2014 invasion of the peninsula and a controversial referendum on the territory's ascension to the Russian Federation as the federal subjects of the Republic of Crimea and Sevastopol, Crimea became a de facto pene-exclave of the country separated by both Ukraine and the Kerch Strait. Most countries still internationally recognise the peninsula as fully part of Ukraine.
- Palanca Marshes – potential Vennbahn-type enclave of Moldova surrounded by Ukraine: Under a 2001 treaty between the two nations, Moldova is to transfer to Ukraine not only the asphalt (as it has already done), but also the real property under 7.7 kilometres of road (a portion of the 300 km road between Odesa and Reni), and to clarify the sovereignty of that land, which under that treaty is to be transferred to Ukraine.

== See also ==
- Overseas territory
- Road § Global connectivity
