= Bangladesh–India enclaves =

Enclaves along the Bangladesh–India border

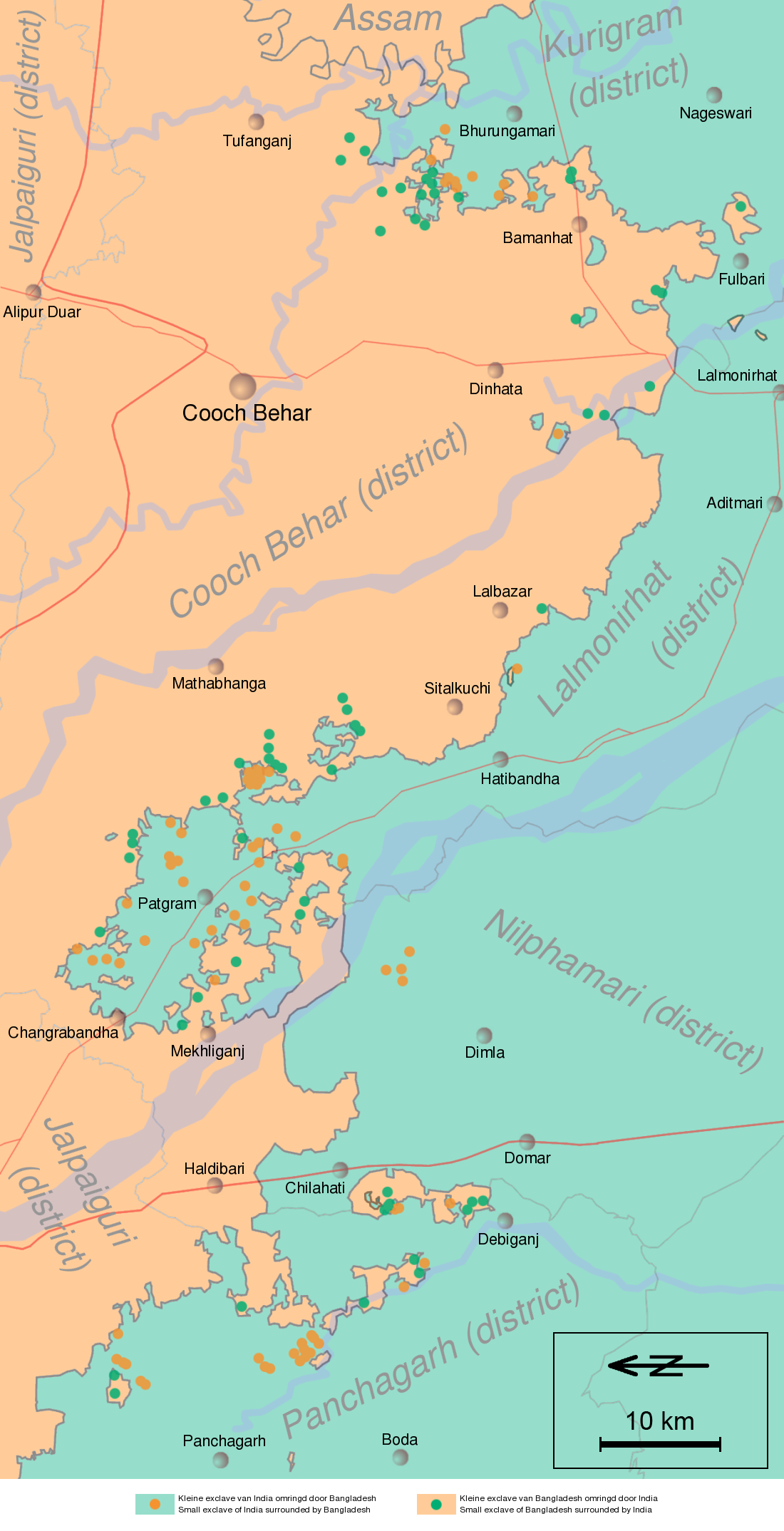
On this map of the various enclaves, east is at the top of the map. India is shown in orange, and Bangladesh is cyan.

The India–Bangladesh enclaves, also known as the Chiṭmahals (Bengali: ছিটমহল chiṭmôhôl) and sometimes called Pasha enclaves, were the enclaves along the Bangladesh–India border, in Bangladesh and the Indian states of West Bengal, Tripura, Assam and Meghalaya. The main body of Bangladesh contained 102 Indian enclaves, which in turn contained 21 Bangladeshi counter-enclaves, one of which contained Dahala Khagrabari, an Indian counter-counter-enclave, the world's only third-order enclave when it existed. The Indian mainland contained 71 Bangladeshi enclaves, which in turn contained 3 Indian counter-enclaves. A joint census in 2010 found 51,549 people who were residing in these enclaves: 37,334 in Indian enclaves within Bangladesh and 14,215 in Bangladeshi enclaves within India.

The Prime Ministers of India and Bangladesh signed the Land Boundary Agreement in 1974 to exchange enclaves and simplify their international border. A revised version of the agreement was adopted by the two countries on 7 May 2015, when the Parliament of India passed the 100th Amendment to the Constitution of India. Under this agreement, which was ratified on 6 June 2015, India received 51 Bangladeshi enclaves (covering 7,110 acres (2,880 ha)) in the Indian mainland, while Bangladesh received 111 Indian enclaves (covering 17,160 acres (6,940 ha)) in the Bangladeshi mainland. The enclave residents were allowed to either continue residing at their present location or move to the country of their choice. The exchange of enclaves was to be implemented in phases between 31 July 2015 and 30 June 2016. The enclaves were exchanged at midnight on 31 July 2015 and the transfer of enclave residents was completed on 30 November 2015. After the Land Boundary Agreement, India lost around 40 square kilometres (15 sq mi) to Bangladesh.

Since the exchange of territory took place, the only remaining enclave is Dahagram–Angarpota, an exclave of Bangladesh.

== History ==
According to a popular legend, the enclaves were used as stakes in card or chess games centuries ago between two regional kings, the Raja of Koch Bihar and the Maharaja of Rangpur. As far as historical records are concerned, the little territories were apparently the result of a confused outcome of a 1713 treaty between the Kingdom of Koch Bihar and the Mughal Empire. Possibly, the Kingdom and the Mughals ended a war without determining a boundary for what territories had been gained or lost.

After the partition of India in 1947, Rangpur was joined to East Pakistan. Cooch Behar State, with its exclaves and holes, was a native state, whose Raja had the option of joining either India or Pakistan. Cooch Behar district was merged in 1949 with India. The desire to "de-enclave" most of the enclaves was manifested in a 1958 agreement between Jawaharlal Nehru and Feroz Khan Noon, the respective Prime Ministers, for an exchange between India and Pakistan without considering loss or gain of territory. But the matter then worked into a Supreme Court case in India, and the Supreme Court ruled that a constitutional amendment was required to transfer the land, so the ninth amendment was introduced to facilitate the implementation of the agreement. The amendment could not be passed because of objections to the transfer of the southern Berubari enclave. Because of India's deteriorated relations with Pakistan, the issue remained unsolved. Negotiations restarted after East Pakistan became independent as Bangladesh in 1971 following the Bangladesh Liberation War.

=== Agreement ===
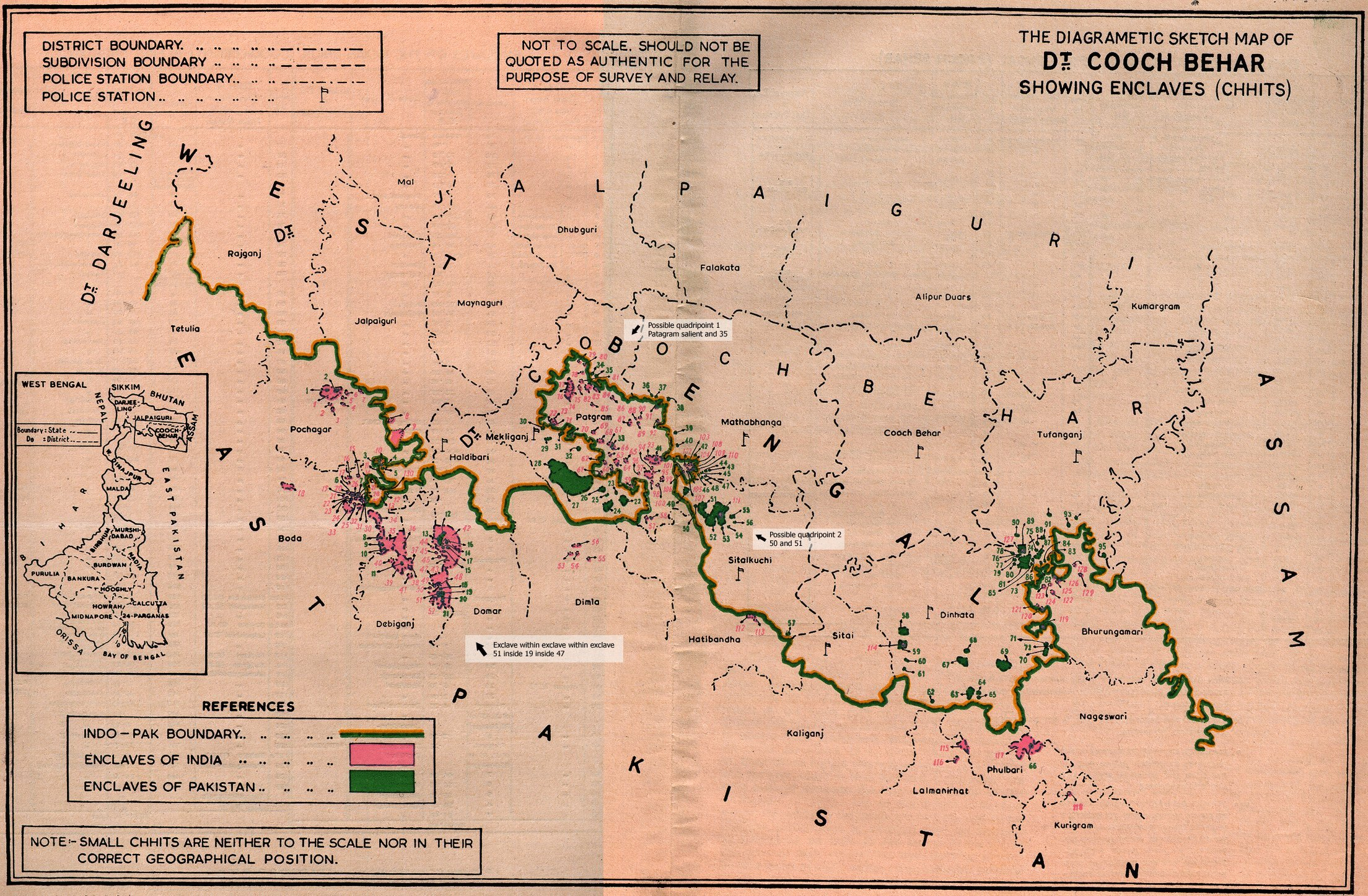
The diagramatic sketch of Cooch Behar district of West Bengal marking enclaves

The Land Boundary Agreement was signed on 16 May 1974 between Indira Gandhi and Sheikh Mujibur Rahman which provided for the exchange of enclaves and the surrender of adverse possessions. Under the agreement, India retained the Berubari Union No. 12 enclave while Bangladesh retained the Dahagram-Angorpota exclaves with India providing access to it by giving a 178-by-85-metre (584 ft × 279 ft) corridor, called the Tin Bigha Corridor. Bangladesh quickly ratified the agreement in 1974 but India failed to do so. The issue of the undemarcated land boundary of approximately 6.1 kilometres (3.8 mi) in three sectors — Daikhata-56 in West Bengal, Muhuri River-Belonia in Tripura and Lathitila-Dumabari in Assam — also remained unsolved. The Tin Bigha Corridor was leased to Bangladesh in 1992 amid local opposition.

The list of enclaves was prepared in 1997 by the two countries. Two Joint Boundary Working Groups were formed to work out the details of enclaves in 2001. A joint census was carried out in May 2007. In September 2011, India signed the Additional Protocol for the 1974 Land Boundary Agreement with Bangladesh. Both nations announced an intention to swap 162 enclaves, giving residents a choice of nationality.

Under the agreement, India received 51 of the 71 Bangladeshi enclaves (from 51 to 54 of the 74 chhits) that were inside India proper (7,110.2 acres, 2,877.4 ha), while Bangladesh received 95 to 101 of the 103 Indian enclaves (111 out of 119 chhits) that were inside Bangladesh proper (17,160.63 acres, 6,944.66 ha). Bangladesh retained the 4,617 acres (1,868 ha) of its Dahagram-Angarpota exclave. India acquired 2,777.038 acres (1,123.827 ha) adverse possession areas and transferred 2,267.682 acres (917.698 ha) adverse possession areas to Bangladesh. After the exchange of enclaves, India lost around 40 km^{2} (10,000 acres) to Bangladesh. According to July 2010 joint census, there were 14,215 people residing in Bangladeshi enclaves in India and 37,269 people residing in Indian enclaves in Bangladesh. The people living in these enclaves without a nationality were allowed to choose their nationality.

The Constitution (119th Amendment) Bill, 2013 was introduced in the Rajya Sabha, the upper house of the Parliament of India, on 18 December 2013. Nationalist groups in Assam strongly opposed the bill, which would cause India to lose 40 km^{2} (10,000 acres) of land, but Indian Prime Minister Narendra Modi supported it because it would make the border with Bangladesh easier to manage. The parliament panel, Standing Committee on External Affairs, approved the bill in November 2014. The Rajya Sabha approved the constitutional amendment on 6 May 2015, and the Lok Sabha approved it the following day. President of India Pranab Mukherjee gave his assent to the Act on 28 May 2015.

On 6 June 2015, Modi ratified the agreement during his visit to the Bangladesh capital Dhaka. In the presence of Modi and Bangladeshi Prime Minister Sheikh Hasina, the foreign secretaries of the two countries signed the instruments of the land exchange. The exchange of enclaves and land parcels in adverse possession, and the boundary demarcation, was implemented in phases between 31 July 2015 and 30 June 2016. The enclaves were to be exchanged at midnight on 31 July 2015 and the boundary demarcation was to be completed by 30 June 2016 by Survey Departments of the respective countries. The transfer of enclave residents was expected to be completed by 30 November 2015.

Indian and Bangladeshi officials conducted a field survey of enclave residents between 6 July 2015 and 16 July 2015. Seventy-five teams, made up of one Indian and one Bangladeshi member each, were tasked with conducting the enumeration. Twenty-five teams surveyed the Bangladeshi enclaves which would be transferred to India, while 50 worked on the Indian enclaves that would be transferred to Bangladesh. As the enclave residents were allowed to choose citizenship of either nation, by 13 July 2015, 100 families residing in the Indian enclaves applied for Indian citizenship, while none of the residents of the Bangladeshi enclaves chose to go to Bangladesh. New citizenship, if chosen, took effect from 1 August 2015. Nearly 14,000 people living in the former Bangladeshi enclaves became Indian citizens, while about 36,000 people living in the former Indian enclaves became Bangladeshi citizens. Some 1,000 people in the former Indian enclaves chose Indian citizenship and were to be relocated to India by December 2015.

== Notable enclaves ==
Dahala Khagrabari was the world's only third-order enclave. It was a piece of India within Bangladesh, within India, within Bangladesh. It was less than 0.70 hectares (1.7 acres) in area, and contained a field. (Maps)

=== Bangladesh ===
Dahagram–Angarpota: The largest Bangladeshi composite enclave (combining the first- and third-largest Bangladeshi chhits by area), administered as part of Patgram Upazila in Lalmonirhat Zila, lies within the Indian province of West Bengal. It is separated from the contiguous area of Bangladesh at its closest point by 178 metres (584 ft). The enclave has an area of 25.95 km^{2} (10.02 sq mi) with a resident population of 20,000 people. The enclave lacks basic facilities. The lone health complex remains virtually useless because of lack of power supply, as India refused to allow Bangladesh to run power lines to the enclave. After the exchange of enclaves in July 2015, Bangladesh retained it as an exclave.

The Tin Bigha Corridor, a strip of Indian territory 85 metres (279 ft) wide running from the Dahagram–Angarpota composite enclave to the Bangladeshi mainland at their nearest approach, was leased by India in perpetuity to Bangladesh for access to the enclave. It is available for use by the residents of Dahagram–Angarpota.

=== India ===
Dasiar Chhara, the fourth largest Indian chhit by area, was the largest stand-alone Indian enclave (i.e., not a composite of adjoining chhits). It lay 3 km (1.9 mi) from the main part of India and had an area of 6.65 km^{2} (2.57 sq mi).

Dahala Khagrabari, enclave #51, was the world's only third-order enclave, being a piece of India within Bangladesh, within India, within Bangladesh. It was the site of a jute field, owned by a Bangladeshi farmer living in the Bangladeshi second-order enclave surrounding Dahala Khagrabari. As part of the 2015 border agreement, India ceded it to Bangladesh.

== List of former enclaves and exclaves ==
Schematic overview:

Bangladesh 102 enclaves of India (69.5 km^{2}) 21 counter-enclaves of Bangladesh (2.1 km^{2}) 1 counter-counter enclave of India (0.007 km^{2})	India 71 enclaves of Bangladesh (47.7 km^{2}) 7 counter-enclaves of India (0.17 km^{2})

Some individual enclaves were composed of several administrative units (chhits and/or mauzas). These administrative units must be differentiated from the enclave as a whole. "This is particularly important for the Cooch Behar enclaves, where the several administrative units which together form some of the larger enclaves are commonly, but wrongly, termed enclaves themselves, or where one component unit commonly lends its name to the whole enclave. ... [T]he official Indo–Bangladesh Boundary Commission figure of 111 Indian and 51 Bangladeshi exchangeable enclaves would appear to count only individual mauzas, even when these consisted of more than one enclave." There is not a one-to-one relationship between enclaves, chhits and mauzas.

All of the information shown in the following two tables has been assembled from Brendan R. Whyte.

=== Bangladesh ===
In order to distinguish chhits having the same names, serial numbers established by Banerjee (1966) are shown in parentheses, as (#). The Bangladesh series is separate from the India series.

With 4 exceptions (Chhat Tilai, Baikunthapur Teldhar (#3, #4, #5)), the first-order enclaves, including the 3 composite enclaves, lay entirely within the Cooch Behar District of West Bengal state, India. All 21 counter-enclaves lay within the Rangpur Division of Bangladesh. The Bangladeshi enclaves had an estimated population of 14,215 in 2015.

Bangladeshi chhits within Indian territory	Area (km^{2})	Area (mi^{2})	Notes
Dahagram-Angarpota	18.684	7.214	Largest composite exclave of Bangladesh within India, comprises the contiguous Dahagram and Angarpota chhits. This exclave continues to exist in spite of the 2015 land swap.
Dahagram❋	15.690	6.058	Largest chhit of Bangladesh, part of the Dahagram-Angarpota composite exclave within India.
Nalgram	7.705	2.975	Composite exclave of Bangladesh within India, comprises the contiguous Falnapur and Nalgram (#52) chhits.
Nalgram (#52)❋	5.655	2.183	Part of the Nalgram composite exclave within India (area includes 2 other smaller chhits, each itself an exclave and true enclave, each also named Nalgram (#53, #54)). Surrounded the Indian counter-enclave, Nalgram Chhit (#111).
Nalgram (#53)	see #52	see #52	First-order enclave within India, area combined with that shown for the larger Nalgram (#52).
Nalgram (#54)	see #52	see #52	First-order enclave within India, area combined with that shown for the larger Nalgram (#52).
Angarpota❋	2.994	1.156	Part of the Dahagram-Angarpota composite exclave within India.
Dakshin Masaldanga	<2.797	<1.080	Composite exclave of Bangladesh within India, comprises the contiguous Kachua and Dakshin Masaldanga (#74) chhits.
Poaturkuthi	2.387	0.922	First-order enclave within India.
Batrigach (#59)	2.337	0.902	First-order enclave within India (area includes the smaller Batrigach (#60), itself an exclave and true enclave). Surrounded the Indian counter-enclave, Madnakura Chhit in Bhoti Nath Batrigach.
Batrigach (#60)	see #59	see #59	First-order enclave within India, area combined with that shown for the larger Batrigach (#59).
Dakshin Masaldanga (#74)❋	2.312	0.893	Part of the Dakshin Masaldanga composite exclave (along with Kachua chhit) within India; area included 6 other smaller chhits, each also named Dakshin Masaldanga (#73, 75, 76, 77, 78 & 90), each itself an exclave and true enclave.
Dakshin Masaldanga (#73)	see #74	see #74	First-order enclave within India, area combined with that shown for the larger Dakshin Masaldanga (#74).
Dakshin Masaldanga (#75)	see #74	see #74	First-order enclave within India, area combined with that shown for the larger Dakshin Masaldanga (#74).
Dakshin Masaldanga (#76)	see #74	see #74	First-order enclave within India, area combined with that shown for the larger Dakshin Masaldanga (#74).
Dakshin Masaldanga (#77)	see #74	see #74	First-order enclave within India, area combined with that shown for the larger Dakshin Masaldanga (#74).
Dakshin Masaldanga (#78)	see #74	see #74	First-order enclave within India, area combined with that shown for the larger Dakshin Masaldanga (#74).
Dakshin Masaldanga (#90)	see #74	see #74	First-order enclave within India, area combined with that shown for the larger Dakshin Masaldanga (#74).
Falnapur❋	2.050	0.792	Part of the Nalgram composite exclave within India.
Sibprasad Mustafi (#67)	1.510	0.583	First-order enclave within India (area includes the smaller Sibprasad Mustafi (#68), itself an exclave and true enclave).
Sibprasad Mustafi (#68)	see #67	see #67	First-order enclave within India, area combined with that shown for the larger Sibprasad Mustafi (#67).
Chhit Kuchlibari	1.500	0.579	First-order enclave within India.
Bala Pukhari	1.342	0.518	First-order enclave within India.
Karala (#63)	1.092	0.422	First-order enclave within India (area includes 2 other smaller chhits, each itself an exclave and true enclave, each also named Karala (#64, #65)).
Karala (#64)	see #63	see #63	First-order enclave within India, area combined with that shown for the larger Karala (#63).
Karala (#65)	see #63	see #63	First-order enclave within India, area combined with that shown for the larger Karala (#63).
Kismat Batrigach	0.850	0.328	First-order enclave within India.
Dhabalsati Mirgipur	0.704	0.272	First-order enclave within India.
Upan Chowki Bhajni, 111	0.685	0.264	Counter-exclave that was surrounded by and shared borders with two contiguous Indian chhits, Balapara Khagrabari (#42) and Kothajni (#43) (both within the composite exclave named "Balapara Khagrabari" in the Panchagarh District of Bangladesh).
Purba Masaldanga (#87)	0.623	0.241	First-order enclave within India (area includes the smaller Purba Masaldanga (#86), itself an exclave and true enclave). A map from the 1930s and a 1940 source imply that Purba Masaldanga (#86) and (#87) formed a single enclave. However, topographic mapping and other sources suggest two enclaves, as listed here, but if joined, they were connected across the narrowest gap separating them, along a beel (marshy former river course).
Purba Masaldanga (#86)	see #87	see #87	First-order enclave within India, area combined with that shown for the larger Purba Masaldanga (#87).
Paschim Bakalir Chhara	0.615	0.237	First-order enclave within India.
Madhya Masaldanga	0.553	0.214	First-order enclave within India. Surrounded the Indian counter-enclave, Chhit Seoruguri.
Mahishmari	0.497	0.192	First-order enclave within India.
Kachua❋	0.485	0.187	Part of the Dakshin Masaldanga composite exclave (along with Dakshin Masaldanga #74) within India.
Upan Chowki Bhajni, 110	0.449	0.173	Counter-enclave surrounded by an Indian exclave, Dahala Khagrabari (#47), located within the Panchagarh District of Bangladesh. It surrounds the only counter-counter-enclave in the world, Dahala Khagrabari (#51).
Chhit Panbari	0.439	0.169	First-order enclave within India.
Jote Nijjama	0.354	0.137	First-order enclave within India; it may possibly have formed an international quadripoint (one point in common with four different areas) of Bangladesh and India: two parts of Patgram thana (main part and the Jote Nijjama enclave itself) in Lalmonirhat District and two parts of Mekhliganj thana in Mekhliganj subdivision, Cooch Behar District, India.
Chhat Tilai	0.330	0.127	First-order enclave within India, straddling the border of Cooch Behar District (West Bengal) and Dhubri District (Assam).
Upan Chowki Bhajni, 22	0.292	0.113	Counter-enclave surrounded by an Indian exclave, Dahala Khagrabari (#47), located within the Panchagarh District of Bangladesh.
Chhit Land of Jagatber No. 3	0.283	0.109	First-order enclave within India.
Chhit Dhabalsati	0.269	0.104	First-order enclave within India.
Dhabalsati (#32)	0.245	0.095	First-order enclave within India.
Baikunthapur Teldhar (#4)	0.210	0.081	First-order enclave within Jalpaiguri District, West Bengal, India (area includes 2 other smaller chhits, each itself an exclave and true enclave, each also named Baikunthapur Teldhar (#3, #5)).
Baikunthapur Teldhar (#3)	see #4	see #4	First-order enclave within Jalpaiguri District, West Bengal, India (area combined with that shown for the larger Baikunthapur Teldhar (#4)).
Baikunthapur Teldhar (#5)	see #4	see #4	First-order enclave within Jalpaiguri District, West Bengal, India (area combined with that shown for the larger Baikunthapur Teldhar (#4)).
Chhit Nalgram (#55)	0.200	0.077	First-order enclave within India (area includes Chhit Nalgram (#56), itself an exclave and true enclave).
Chhit Nalgram (#56)	see #55	see #55	First-order enclave within India, area combined with that shown for Chhit Nalgram (#55).
Uttar Bansjani	0.191	0.074	First-order enclave within India.
Chhit Bhandardaha	0.162	0.063	First-order enclave within India.
Upan Chowki Bhajni, 113	0.148	0.057	Counter-exclave surrounded by and sharing a border with two contiguous Indian exclaves, Balapara Khagrabari (#42) and Kothajni (#43) (both within the composite exclave named "Balapara Khagrabari" in the Panchagarh District of Bangladesh).
Purba Chhit Masaldanga (#84)	0.142	0.055	First-order enclave within India (area includes the smaller Purba Chhit Masaldanga (#83), itself an exclave and true enclave).
Purba Chhit Masaldanga (#83)	see #84	see #84	First-order enclave within India, area combined with that shown for the larger Purba Chhit Masaldanga (#84).
Bara Saradubi	0.141	0.054	First-order enclave within India; formed an international quadripoint (one point in common with four different areas) of Bangladesh and India: two parts of Hatibandha thana (main part and the Bara Saradubi enclave itself) in Lalmonirhat District and two parts of Sitalkuchi thana in Mathabhanga subdivision, Cooch Behar District, India.
Chandrakhan	0.140	0.054	Counter-enclave surrounded by an Indian true enclave/exclave, Dasiar Chhara (#117), located within the Kurigram District of Bangladesh.
Madhya Bakalir Chhara	0.132	0.051	First-order enclave within India.
Chhit Land of Jagatber No. 1	0.124	0.048	First-order enclave within India.
Chhit Kokoabari	0.1193	0.0461	First-order enclave within India.
Paschim Masaldanga (#79)	0.1193	0.0461	First-order enclave within India (area includes Paschim Masaldanga (#80), itself an exclave and true enclave).
Paschim Masaldanga (#80)	see #79	see #79	First-order enclave within India, area combined with that shown for Paschim Masaldanga (#79).
Uttar Masaldanga	0.1104	0.0426	First-order enclave within India.
Chhit Land of Jagatber No. 2	0.1096	0.0423	First-order enclave within India.
Chhit Land of Dhabalguri No. 2	0.1086	0.0419	First-order enclave within India.
Bansua Khamar Gitaldaha	0.0993	0.0383	First-order enclave within India.
Uttar Dhaldanga (#93)	0.0966	0.0373	First-order enclave within India (area includes 2 other smaller chhits, each itself an exclave and true enclave, each also named Uttar Dhaldanga (#92, #94)).
Uttar Dhaldanga (#92)	see #93	see #93	First-order enclave within India, area combined with that shown for the larger Uttar Dhaldanga (#93).
Uttar Dhaldanga (#94)	see #93	see #93	First-order enclave within India, area combined with that shown for the larger Uttar Dhaldanga (#93).
Chhit Dhabalguri	0.0903	0.0349	First-order enclave within India.
Durgapur	0.0848	0.0327	First-order enclave within India.
Nazirganj (#10)	0.0799 †	0.0308 †	Counter-enclave surrounded by an Indian exclave, Bewladanga (#39), located within the Panchagarh District of Bangladesh.
Teldhar (#1)	0.0586	0.0226	Counter-enclave surrounded by an Indian true enclave/exclave, Garati (#1), located within the Panchagarh District of Bangladesh (area includes the smaller Teldhar (#2), itself an exclave and true enclave).
Teldhar (#2)	see #1	see #1	Counter-enclave surrounded by an Indian true enclave/exclave, Garati (#1), located within the Panchagarh District of Bangladesh, area combined with that shown for the larger Teldhar (#1).
Upan Chowki Bhajni, 112	0.0571	0.0220	Counter-enclave surrounded by an Indian exclave, Kothajni (#43), located within the Panchagarh District of Bangladesh.
Chhit Land of Dhabalguri No. 1	0.0565	0.0218	First-order enclave within India.
Dhabalguri	0.0506	0.0195	First-order enclave within India.
Purba Bakalir Chhara	0.0495	0.0191	First-order enclave within India.
Madhya Chhit Masaldanga	0.0480	0.0185	First-order enclave within India.
Jongra	0.0334	0.0129	Counter-enclave surrounded by an Indian true enclave/exclave, Banskata (#93), located within the Lalmonirhat District of Bangladesh.
Paschim Chhit Masaldanga	0.0308	0.0119	First-order enclave within India.
Debi Doba	0.0302	0.0117	Counter-enclave surrounded by an Indian exclave, Dahala Khagrabari (#47), located within the Panchagarh District of Bangladesh.
Nazirganj −29	0.0265	0.0102	Counter-enclave surrounded by an Indian true enclave/exclave, Nazirganj (#27), located within the Panchagarh District of Bangladesh.
Debottar Saldanga	0.0247	0.0095	Counter-enclave surrounded by an Indian exclave, Bewladanga (#39), located within the Panchagarh District of Bangladesh.
Chhit Land of Dhabalguri No. 4	0.0184	0.0071	First-order enclave within India.
Chhit Land of Dhabalguri No. 5	0.0167	0.0064	First-order enclave within India.
Bamandal	0.0089	0.0034	First-order enclave within India.
Chhit Land of Kuchlibari	0.0074	0.0029	First-order enclave within India.
Upan Chowki Bhajni, 99	0.0071	0.0027	Counter-enclave surrounded by an Indian exclave, Kothajni (#43), located within the Panchagarh District of Bangladesh.
Dhabalsati (#33)	0.0065	0.0025	Counter-enclave surrounded by an Indian exclave, Bara Khangir (#66), located within the Lalmonirhat District of Bangladesh.
Nazirganj (#8)	0.0062 †	0.0024 †	Counter-enclave surrounded by an Indian exclave, Shalbari (#35), located within the Panchagarh District of Bangladesh.
Upan Chowki Bhajni, 13	0.0054	0.0021	Counter-enclave surrounded by an Indian exclave, Kothajni (#43), located within the Panchagarh District of Bangladesh.
Chhit Land of Dhabalguri No. 3	0.0054	0.0021	First-order enclave within India.
Amjhol	0.0051	0.0020	First-order enclave within India.
Chhit Land of Panbari No. 2	0.0046	0.0018	First-order enclave within India.
Nazirganj −30	0.0046	0.0018	Counter-enclave surrounded by an Indian true enclave/exclave, Nazirganj (#19), located within the Panchagarh District of Bangladesh.
Srirampur	0.0042	0.0016	First-order enclave within India.
Upan Chowki Bhajni, 15	0.0041	0.0016	Counter-enclave surrounded by an Indian exclave, Dahala Khagrabari (#47), located within the Panchagarh District of Bangladesh.
Nazirganj (#9)	0.00291 †	0.00112 †	Counter-enclave surrounded by an Indian exclave, Shalbari (#35), located within the Panchagarh District of Bangladesh.
Upan Chowki Bhajni, 24	0.00287	0.00111	Smallest known chhit of Bangladesh, a counter-enclave surrounded by an Indian exclave, Kothajni (#43), located within the Panchagarh District of Bangladesh.

❋ This chhit was part of a composite enclave and by itself was neither an enclave nor an exclave.
† Stated size may not be exact.

=== India ===
The 102 first-order enclaves (including the 6 composite enclaves) and the 1 counter-counter enclave lay within the Rangpur Division of Bangladesh. The 3 counter-enclaves lay within the Cooch Behar District of West Bengal state, India. In order to distinguish chhits having the same names, serial numbers established by Banerjee (1966) are shown in parentheses, as (#). The India series is separate from the Bangladesh series. There were 37,334 people living in the Indian enclaves in 2015.

Indian chhits within Bangladeshi territory	Area (km^{2})	Area (mi^{2})	Notes
Balapara Khagrabari	25.952	10.020	Composite exclave of India, bordering the Panchagarh and Nilphamari Districts, Bangladesh, comprised the contiguous Dahala Khagrabari (#47), Kothajni (#43) and Balapara Khagrabari (#42) chhits (area includes 6 other smaller chhits, each itself an exclave and true enclave: 3 also named Dahala Khagrabari (#48, #49, #50) and 3 also named Kothajni (#44, #45, #46)).
Shalbari	14.091	5.441	Composite exclave of India within the Panchagarh District of Bangladesh, comprised the contiguous Shalbari (#35), Bewladanga (#39), Kajal Dighi, Daikhata Chhat, Nataoka (#37) and Nataoka (#38) chhits.
Dahala Khagrabari (#47)❋	10.717	4.138	Largest chhit of India, part of Balapara Khagrabari composite exclave within the Panchagarh District of Bangladesh (area includes 3 other smaller chhits, each itself an exclave and true enclave, each also named Dahala Khagrabari (#48, #49, #50)).
Dahala Khagrabari (#48)	see #47	see #47	First-order enclave within the Panchagarh District of Bangladesh, area combined with that shown for the larger Dahala Khagrabari (#47).
Dahala Khagrabari (#49)	see #47	see #47	First-order enclave within the Panchagarh District of Bangladesh, area combined with that shown for the larger Dahala Khagrabari (#47).
Dahala Khagrabari (#50)	see #47	see #47	First-order enclave within the Panchagarh District of Bangladesh, area combined with that shown for the larger Dahala Khagrabari (#47).
Kothajni (#43)❋	8.143	3.144	Part of Balapara Khagrabari composite exclave, bordering the Panchagarh and Nilphamari Districts, Bangladesh (area includes 3 other smaller chhits, each itself an exclave and true enclave, each also named Kothajni (#44, #45, #46)).
Kothajni (#44)	see #43	see #43	First-order enclave within the Panchagarh District of Bangladesh, area combined with that shown for the larger Kothajni (#43).
Kothajni (#45)	see #43	see #43	First-order enclave within the Panchagarh District of Bangladesh, area combined with that shown for the larger Kothajni (#43).
Kothajni (#46)	see #43	see #43	First-order exclave bordering the Panchagarh and Nilphamari Districts, Bangladesh, area combined with that shown for the larger Kothajni (#43).
Balapara Khagrabari (#42)❋	7.092	2.738	Part of Balapara Khagrabari composite exclave, bordering the Panchagarh District and Nilphamari Districts, Bangladesh.
Dasiar Chhara	6.651	2.568	First-order enclave within the Kurigram District of Bangladesh.
Shalbari (#35)❋	4.811	1.858	Part of Shalbari composite exclave within the Panchagarh District of Bangladesh.
Garati (#1)	3.920	1.514	First-order enclave within the Panchagarh District of Bangladesh.
Bewladanga (#39)❋	3.479	1.343	Part of Shalbari composite exclave within the Panchagarh District of Bangladesh.
Kajal Dighi❋	3.122	1.205	Part of Shalbari composite exclave within the Panchagarh District of Bangladesh.
Daikhata Chhat❋	2.020	0.780	Part of Shalbari composite exclave within the Panchagarh District of Bangladesh.
Najirgonja (#33)	1.758	0.679	First-order enclave within the Panchagarh District of Bangladesh.
Banskata (#93)	1.675	0.647	First-order enclave within the Lalmonirhat District of Bangladesh.
Kamat Changrabandha	1.626	0.628	Composite exclave of India within the Lalmonirhat District of Bangladesh, comprised the contiguous Bhotbari (#74), Panisala (#77) and Kamat Changrabandha (#75, #76) chhits.
Banskata (#97)	1.275	0.492	First-order enclave within the Lalmonirhat District of Bangladesh.
Lotamari (#83)	1.147	0.443	First-order enclave within the Lalmonirhat District of Bangladesh.
Kharkharia	0.904	0.349	Composite exclave of India within the Lalmonirhat District of Bangladesh, comprised the contiguous Lotamari (#73), Kharkharia (#71) and Kharkharia (#72) chhits.
Bans Pachai	0.879	0.339	First-order exclave bordering the Lalmonirhat and Kurigram Districts, Bangladesh.
Bhotbari (#74)❋	0.831	0.321	Part of Kamat Changrabandha composite exclave within the Lalmonirhat District of Bangladesh.
Natatoka (#37)❋	0.657	0.254	Part of Shalbari composite exclave within the Panchagarh District of Bangladesh.
Panisala (#77)❋	0.557	0.215	Part of Kamat Changrabandha composite exclave within the Lalmonirhat District of Bangladesh.
Bara Khangir	0.523	0.202	Composite exclave of India within the Lalmonirhat District of Bangladesh, comprised the contiguous Bara Khangir (#66) and Chhat Bagdokra chhits.
Gotamuri Chhit (#112)	0.512	0.198	First-order enclave within the Lalmonirhat District of Bangladesh.
Putimari	0.497	0.192	First-order enclave within the Panchagarh District of Bangladesh.
Lotamari (#73)❋	0.449	0.173	Part of Kharkharia composite exclave within the Lalmonirhat District of Bangladesh.
Lotamari (#84)	0.400	0.154	First-order enclave within the Lalmonirhat District of Bangladesh.
Bara Khangir (#66)❋	0.354	0.137	Part of Bara Khangir composite exclave within the Lalmonirhat District of Bangladesh.
Bans Pachai Bhitarkuthi	0.331	0.128	First-order enclave within the Lalmonirhat District of Bangladesh.
Najirgonja	0.309	0.119	Composite exclave of India within the Panchagarh District of Bangladesh, comprised the contiguous Najirgonja (#28, #29, #30, #31) chhits.
Garati (#3)	0.298	0.115	First-order enclave within the Panchagarh District of Bangladesh.
Najirgonja (#27)	0.297	0.115	First-order enclave within the Panchagarh District of Bangladesh.
Panisala (#81)	0.262	0.101	First-order enclave within the Lalmonirhat District of Bangladesh.
Kharkharia (#71)❋	0.246	0.095	Part of Kharkharia composite exclave within the Lalmonirhat District of Bangladesh.
Ratanpur	0.238	0.092	First-order enclave within the Lalmonirhat District of Bangladesh.
Najirgonja (#32)	0.236	0.091	First-order enclave within the Panchagarh District of Bangladesh.
Garati (#6)	0.236	0.091	First-order enclave within the Panchagarh District of Bangladesh.
Banskata (#96)	0.234	0.090	First-order enclave within the Lalmonirhat District of Bangladesh.
Chhat Bhothat	0.227	0.088	First-order enclave within the Lalmonirhat District of Bangladesh.
Balapukhari	0.226	0.087	First-order enclave within the Lalmonirhat District of Bangladesh.
Najirgonja (#19)	0.219	0.085	First-order enclave within the Panchagarh District of Bangladesh.
Najirgonja (#31)❋	0.216	0.083	Part of Najirgonja composite exclave within the Panchagarh District of Bangladesh.
Kharkharia (#72)❋	0.209	0.081	Part of Kharkharia composite exclave within the Lalmonirhat District of Bangladesh.
Panisala (#82)	0.208	0.080	First-order enclave within the Lalmonirhat District of Bangladesh.
Bara Khangir (#65)	0.204	0.079	First-order enclave within the Lalmonirhat District of Bangladesh.
Najirgonja (#25)	0.198	0.076	First-order enclave within the Panchagarh District of Bangladesh. Najirgonja (#25) and (#26) are shown joined as one in pre-1947 maps, but as separate in 1991 Indian census maps.
Dwarikamari (#86)	0.185	0.071	First-order enclave within the Lalmonirhat District of Bangladesh.
Seotikursa	0.185	0.071	First-order enclave within the Kurigram District of Bangladesh.
Uponchowki Kuhlibari (#62)	0.178	0.069	First-order enclave within the Lalmonirhat District of Bangladesh.
Kamat Changrabandha (#75)❋	0.173	0.067	Part of Kamat Changrabandha composite exclave within the Lalmonirhat District of Bangladesh.
Chhat Bagdokra❋	0.169	0.065	Part of Bara Khangir composite exclave within the Lalmonirhat District of Bangladesh.
Bara Gaochulka	0.162	0.063	First-order enclave within the Kurigram District of Bangladesh.
Dwarikamari (#85)	0.160	0.062	First-order enclave within the Lalmonirhat District of Bangladesh.
Bhotbari (#63)	0.149	0.058	First-order enclave within the Lalmonirhat District of Bangladesh.
Bara Khanki Kharija Gitaldaha (#54)	0.149	0.058	First-order enclave within the Nilphamari District of Bangladesh.
Dwarikamarikhasbash	0.148	0.057	First-order enclave within the Lalmonirhat District of Bangladesh.
Chhoto Guraljhara I	0.145	0.056	First-order enclave within the Kurigram District of Bangladesh.
Madnakura Chhit in Bhoti Nath Batrigach	0.144	0.056	Counter-enclave surrounded by a Bangladeshi true enclave/exclave, Batrigach (#59), located within Cooch Behar District of West Bengal state, India.
Nagarjikabari	0.135	0.052	First-order enclave within the Nilphamari District of Bangladesh.
Banskata (#100)	0.134	0.052	First-order enclave within the Lalmonirhat District of Bangladesh.
Shahebganj	0.128	0.049	First-order enclave within the Kurigram District of Bangladesh.
Banskata (#104)	0.125 †	0.048 †	First-order enclave within the Lalmonirhat District of Bangladesh.
Banskata (#94)	0.1244	0.0480	First-order enclave within the Lalmonirhat District of Bangladesh.
Barakhangir	0.1236	0.0477	First-order enclave within the Nilphamari District of Bangladesh.
Banskata (#99)	0.1182	0.0456	First-order enclave within the Lalmonirhat District of Bangladesh.
Bagdokra	0.1032	0.0398	First-order enclave within the Lalmonirhat District of Bangladesh.
Banskata (#109)	0.0986 †	0.0381 †	First-order enclave within the Lalmonirhat District of Bangladesh.
Banskata (#88)	0.0904	0.0349	First-order enclave within the Lalmonirhat District of Bangladesh.
Kalamati	0.0858	0.0331	First-order enclave within the Kurigram District of Bangladesh.
Banskata (#90)	0.0853	0.0329	First-order enclave within the Lalmonirhat District of Bangladesh.
Gotamuri Chhit (#113)	0.0810	0.0313	First-order enclave within the Lalmonirhat District of Bangladesh.
Panisala (#80)	0.0729	0.0281	First-order enclave within the Lalmonirhat District of Bangladesh.
Garati (#4)	0.0728	0.0281	First-order enclave within the Panchagarh District of Bangladesh. Garati (#4) and (#5) are shown joined as one enclave in pre-1947 topographic maps, in which the smaller (#5) adjoins the northern boundary of the larger (#4). Later sources (1991 Indian census maps and Banerjee, 1966) depict them as separate.
Najirgonja (#29)❋	0.0726	0.0280	Part of Najirgonja composite exclave within the Panchagarh District of Bangladesh.
Chhoto Guraljhara II	0.0722	0.0279	First-order enclave within the Kurigram District of Bangladesh.
Banskata (#108)	0.0686 †	0.0265	First-order enclave within the Lalmonirhat District of Bangladesh.
Kamat Changrabandha (#76)❋	0.0648	0.0250	Part of Kamat Changrabandha composite exclave within the Lalmonirhat District of Bangladesh.
Dakurhat Dakinir Kuthi	0.0577	0.0223	First-order enclave within the Kurigram District of Bangladesh.
Najirgonja (#16)	0.0575	0.0222	First-order enclave within the Panchagarh District of Bangladesh.
Banskata (#101)	0.0515 †	0.0199 †	First-order enclave within the Lalmonirhat District of Bangladesh.
Dighaltari I	0.0498	0.0192	First-order enclave within the Kurigram District of Bangladesh.
Najirgonja (#26)	0.0493	0.0190	First-order enclave within the Panchagarh District of Bangladesh. Najirgonja (#25) and (#26) are shown joined as one in pre-1947 maps, but as separate in 1991 Indian census maps.
Banskata (#95)	0.0492	0.0190	First-order enclave within the Lalmonirhat District of Bangladesh.
Banskata (#89)	0.0484	0.0187	First-order enclave within the Lalmonirhat District of Bangladesh.
Gaochulka I	0.0361	0.0139	First-order enclave within the Kurigram District of Bangladesh.
Dighaltari II	0.0357	0.0138	First-order enclave within the Kurigram District of Bangladesh.
Najirgonja (#17)	0.0335	0.0129	First-order enclave within the Panchagarh District of Bangladesh.
Chenakata	0.0316 †	0.0122 †	First-order enclave within the Lalmonirhat District of Bangladesh.
Bara Khanki Kharija Gitaldaha (#53)	0.0312	0.0120	First-order enclave within the Nilphamari District of Bangladesh.
Shingimari Part I	0.0246 ± 0.0013	0.00950 ± 0.00050	First-order enclave within the Panchagarh District of Bangladesh.
Kuchlibari (#57)	0.0234	0.0090	First-order enclave within the Lalmonirhat District of Bangladesh.
Jamaldaha Balapukhari	0.0212 †	0.082 †	First-order enclave within the Lalmonirhat District of Bangladesh.
Najirgonja (#24)	0.0204 †	0.0079 †	First-order enclave within the Panchagarh District of Bangladesh.
Nalgram Chhit	0.0191	0.0074	Counter-enclave surrounded by a Bangladeshi exclave, Nalgram (#52), located within Cooch Behar District of West Bengal state, India.
Bara Kuchlibari	0.0176 †	0.0068 †	First-order enclave within the Lalmonirhat District of Bangladesh.
Najirgonja (#28)❋	0.01574	0.00608	Part of Najirgonja composite exclave within the Panchagarh District of Bangladesh.
Najirgonja (#20)	0.01566 †	0.00605 †	First-order enclave within the Panchagarh District of Bangladesh.
Bewladanga (#40)	0.01097	0.00424	First-order enclave within the Panchagarh District of Bangladesh.
Banskata (#103)	0.01032 †	0.00398 †	First-order enclave within the Lalmonirhat District of Bangladesh.
Chhit Seoruguri	0.01016	0.00392	Smallest Indian counter-enclave, surrounded by a Bangladeshi true enclave/exclave, Madhya Masaldanga, located within Cooch Behar District of West Bengal state, India.
Banskata (#102)	0.00943 †	0.00364 †	First-order enclave within the Lalmonirhat District of Bangladesh.
Kuchlibari (#58)	0.00826	0.00319	First-order enclave within the Lalmonirhat District of Bangladesh.
Garati (#2)	0.00704	0.00272	First-order enclave within the Panchagarh District of Bangladesh.
Dahala Khagrabari (#51)	0.00688	0.00266	Dahala Khagrabari (#51) was the only counter-counter enclave in the world. It was surrounded by Upanchowki Bhajni 110, a Bangladeshi counter-enclave within the Indian composite exclave named Balapara Khagrabari, which was surrounded by the Panchagarh District of Bangladesh. Dahala Khagrabari (#51) was not part of the Balapara Khagrabari composite exclave, as it was not contiguous to it and bordered only Bangladesh.
Bhogramguri	0.00583 †	0.00225 †	First-order enclave within the Lalmonirhat District of Bangladesh.
Banskata (#106)	0.00563 †	0.00217 †	First-order enclave within the Lalmonirhat District of Bangladesh.
Banskata (#107)	0.00554 †	0.00214 †	First-order enclave within the Lalmonirhat District of Bangladesh.
Najirgonja Chhit (#30)❋	0.00433	0.00167	Part of Najirgonja composite exclave within the Panchagarh District of Bangladesh.
Najirgonja (#22)	0.00421 †	0.00163 †	First-order enclave within the Panchagarh District of Bangladesh.
Najirgonja (#21)	0.00413 †	0.00159 †	First-order enclave within the Panchagarh District of Bangladesh.
Gaochulka II	0.00364	0.00141	First-order enclave within the Kurigram District of Bangladesh.
Fulker Dabri	0.00356 †	0.00137 †	First-order enclave within the Lalmonirhat District of Bangladesh.
Bewladanga Chhat (#41)	0.00336 †	0.00130 †	First-order enclave within the Panchagarh District of Bangladesh.
Garati (#5)	0.00320	0.00124	First-order enclave within the Panchagarh District of Bangladesh. Garati (#4) and (#5) are shown joined as one enclave in pre-1947 topographic maps, in which the smaller (#5) adjoins the northern boundary of the larger (#4). Later sources (1991 Indian census maps and Banerjee, 1966) depict them as separate.
Najirgonja (#23)	0.00312 †	0.00120 †	First-order enclave within the Panchagarh District of Bangladesh.
Banskata (#98)	0.00312	0.00120	First-order enclave within the Lalmonirhat District of Bangladesh.
Banskata (#105)	0.00259 †	0.00100 †	First-order enclave within the Lalmonirhat District of Bangladesh.
Najirgonja (#15)	0.00210	0.00081 †	First-order enclave within the Panchagarh District of Bangladesh.
Dahala Khagrabari (#52)	0.00178	0.00069	First-order enclave within the Panchagarh District of Bangladesh.
Uponchowki Kuchlibari (#61)	0.00129 †	0.00050 †	First-order enclave within the Lalmonirhat District of Bangladesh.
Banskata (#110)	0.00113 †	0.00044 †	First-order enclave within the Lalmonirhat District of Bangladesh.
Panisala (#79)	0.00109 †	0.00042 †	The smallest Indian true enclave; located within the Lalmonirhat District of Bangladesh.
Natatoka (#38)❋	0.00105	0.00041	Smallest known chhit of India, part of Shalbari composite exclave; located within the Panchagarh District of Bangladesh; bordered Bangladesh and Shalbari (#35).

❋ This chhit was part of a composite enclave and by itself was neither an enclave nor an exclave.
† Stated size may not be exact.

== See also ==
- Maghval, counterenclave of Gujarat within Dadra and Nagar Haveli enclave in Gujarat
- Bangladesh–India border
- List of enclaves and exclaves
- Baarle-Hertog in Belgium
- Baarle-Nassau in the Netherlands
- Büsingen in Switzerland
- Campione d'Italia in Switzerland
- Vennbahn in Belgium
