= 2017 China–India border standoff =

Military dispute over road construction

- Photograph of Indian soldiers on Doklam Plateau taken by Chinese soldiers – annotations by the Chinese Foreign Ministry showing Chinese claims
Date	16 June 2017 – 28 August 2017 (2 months, 1 week and 5 days)
Location	Doklam
Result	Status quo ante bellum: Both sides withdraw their troops from Doklam

Belligerents
India (on behalf of Bhutan)	China

Casualties and losses
Several injured	Several injured

The 2017 China–India border standoff or Doklam standoff was a military border standoff between the Indian Armed Forces and the People's Liberation Army of China over Chinese construction of a road in Doklam, near a trijunction border area known in Chinese as Donglang, or Donglang Caochang (meaning Donglang pasture or grazing field). On 16 June 2017 Chinese troops with construction vehicles and road-building equipment began extending an existing road southward in Doklam, a territory that is claimed by both China and India's ally Bhutan.

On 18 June 2017, as part of Operation Juniper, about 270 armed Indian troops with two bulldozers crossed the Sikkim border into Doklam, to stop the Chinese troops from constructing the road. On 28 August, both India and China announced that they had withdrawn all their troops from the face-off site in Doklam.

== Background ==
Location of Doklam and border of Bhutan; Sikkim to the west and Chumbi Valley to the north

Doklam is an area disputed between China and Bhutan located near their tri-junction with India. Unlike China and Bhutan, India does not claim Doklam but supports Bhutan's claim.

China's claim on Doklam is based on the 1890 Convention of Calcutta between China and Britain, which states in Article I:

The boundary of Sikkim and Tibet shall be the crest of the mountain range separating the waters flowing into the Sikkim Teesta and its affluents from the waters flowing into the Tibetan Mochu and northwards into other Rivers of Tibet. The line commences at Mount Gipmochi on the Bhutan frontier, and follows the above-mentioned water-parting to the point where it meets Nepal's territory.

China asserts that by this convention, the starting point of the Sikkim-Tibet border is "Mount Gipmochi on the Bhutan frontier" and that this clearly defines the tri-junction point. However, Bhutan was not a party to the convention and there is no evidence that Bhutan was consulted before signing it.

In 1949, Bhutan signed a treaty with India allowing India to guide its diplomatic and defense affairs. In 2007, the treaty was superseded by a new Friendship Treaty, which released Bhutan from such an obligation, but Bhutan agreed to coordinate its foreign policy with that of India. As stated in its Article 2:

In keeping with the abiding ties of close friendship and cooperation between Bhutan and India, the Government of the Kingdom of Bhutan and the Government of the Republic of India shall cooperate closely with each other on issues relating to their national interests.

From 1958, Chinese maps started showing large parts of Bhutanese territory as part of China. Localized tensions arose in the 1960s but in the 1970s negotiations between China and Bhutan, with India sometimes playing a supporting role, failed to create a consensus on the status of the Doklam plateau. Bhutan and China have held 24 rounds of boundary talks since they began in 1984, with notable agreements reached in 1988 and 1998, the latter also prohibiting the use of force and encouraging both parties to strictly adhere to peaceful means.

In the early 2000s, China built a road up the Sinchela pass (in undisputed territory) and then over the plateau (in disputed territory), leading up to the Doka La pass, until reaching within 68 metres distance to the Indian border post on the Sikkim border. Here, they constructed a turn-around facilitating vehicles to turn back. This road has been in existence at least since 2005. It is the southward extension of this road that sparked the 2017 standoff.

== Timeline ==
On 16 June 2017, Chinese troops with construction vehicles and road-building equipment began extending an existing road southward on the Doklam plateau.

On 18 June 2017, around 270 Indian troops, with weapons and two bulldozers, entered Doklam to stop the Chinese troops from constructing the road.

On 29 June 2017, Bhutan protested against China's construction of a road in the disputed territory. According to the Bhutanese government, China attempted to extend a road that previously terminated at Doka La towards the Bhutan Army camp at Zornpelri near the Jampheri Ridge 2 km to the south; that ridge, viewed as the border by China but as wholly within Bhutan by both Bhutan and India, extends eastward approaching India's highly-strategic Siliguri Corridor. The Bhutanese border was reportedly put on high alert and border security was tightened as a result of the growing tensions.

"Sketch Map of the Site of the Indian Troops' Trespass" – Translated Map published by the Chinese Foreign Ministry on 2 August 2017 showing Chinese claims

On the same day, China's Foreign Ministry released a map depicting Doklam as part of China. Using the map as an illustration, China's Spokesperson Lu Kang read Article I of the 1890 Convention of Calcutta and asserted that it proved the Donglang (Doklam) area, a territory northeast of Gipmochi as shown on the map, belongs to China.

On 30 June, the Ministry of External Affairs of India released the statement entitled Recent Developments in Doklam Area stating its official position. It alleged that China had changed the status quo in violation of a 2012 understanding between the two governments regarding finalizing the tri-junction boundary points and causing security concerns, widely understood as at its strategic Siliguri Corridor. It says that "Indian personnel" at Doka La coordinated with Bhutan and "approached the Chinese construction party and urged them to desist from changing the status quo."

On 30 June, answering a question about Bhutan's protest, China's Spokesperson Lu Kang made the following statement about Doklam's history after asserting that the area where the construction activities are underway is totally under the jurisdiction of China because it is completely located on the Chinese side of the China-Bhutan traditional customary line:

Before the 1960s, if border inhabitants of Bhutan wanted to herd in Doklam, they needed the consent of the Chinese side and had to pay the grass tax to China. Nowadays the Xi Zang Tibet Archives still retain some receipts of the grass tax.

On 3 July 2017, China Foreign Ministry Spokesperson Geng Shuang stated that former Indian prime minister Jawaharlal Nehru accepted the 1890 Britain–China treaty:

On September 26 of the same year, when writing back to Premier Zhou Enlai, Prime Minister Nehru unequivocally stated "the boundary between Sikkim and Xi Zang, China was defined by the 1890 Convention. This boundary was demarcated in 1895. There is no dispute over the boundary between Sikkim and Xi Zang (Tibet), China".

Indian media reported that Nehru's 26 September 1959 letter to Zhou, cited by China, was in fact a point-by-point refutation of the claims made by Zhou on 8 September 1959. In the letter, which was accessed by the Indian press albeit not published in its entirety, Nehru wrote:

This Convention of 1890 also defined the boundary between Sikkim and Tibet; and the boundary was later, in 1895, demarcated. There is thus no dispute regarding the boundary of Sikkim with the Tibet region.

China's Foreign Ministry Spokesperson Geng Shuang replied to Indian media's question about the disputed tri-junction with the following comment:

The so-called tri-junction, as the name suggests, is a point. It is not a line, much less an area. India misinterprets tri-junction point as an area, from ulterior motives. This time, the trespassing point of Indian army, is on the Sikkim-China border, which is 2000 metres away from the tri-junction point, Mount Gipmochi, by the 1890 Treaty.

On 5 July 2017, the Chinese government said that it had, for the past 24 months, a basic consensus with Bhutan that Doklam belongs to China, and there was no dispute between the two countries.

On 19 July 2017, China renewed its call for India to withdraw its troops from Doklam.

On 24 July 2017, Chinese Foreign Minister Wang Yi told reporters that it is very clear who is right and who is wrong in the standoff in Doklam, and that even senior Indian officials have publicly said that Chinese troops have not intruded into Indian territory. "In other words, India admitted that it has entered Chinese territory. The solution to this issue is simple, which is that they behave themselves and withdraw," Wang said.

On 2 August 2017, the Chinese foreign ministry released a 15-page official position statement The Facts and China's Position Concerning the Indian Border Troops' Crossing of the China-India Boundary in the Sikkim Sector into the Chinese Territory. According to this document, there were still over 40 Indian troops and one bulldozer in Doklam (Donglang) region. Beijing accused India of using Bhutan as "a pretext" to interfere and impede the boundary talks between China and Bhutan. The report referred to India's "trespassing" into Doklam as a violation of the territorial sovereignty of China as well as a challenge to the sovereignty and independence of Bhutan. China says in the 15-page document that it notified India regarding its plan to construct road "in advance in full reflection of China's goodwill".

On 3 August 2017, China charged India with four reasons that "India is certainly not for peace" though it always puts peace on its lips.

On 4 August 2017, the Ministry of External Affairs of India refused to confirm or deny when asked why, if India received notification from China in advance of its plan to construct the road, it had not used diplomatic channels before sending its troops across the border since it was seeking a diplomatic solution.

On 8 August 2017, Chinese diplomat Wang Wenli claimed that Bhutan had conveyed to China through diplomatic channels that the area of the standoff is not its territory, saying, "After the incident, the Bhutanese made it very clear to us that the place where the trespassing happened is not Bhutan's territory." The next day, the Bhutanese government denied this, saying over the phone, "Our position on the border issue of Doklam is very clear" and referring to the government's 29 June statement.

On 15 August 2017, several Indian and Chinese soldiers were alleged to have been injured after a melee broke out between them when a group of Chinese soldiers was alleged to have attempted to infiltrate across the border near Pangong Lake into Indian controlled territory in Ladakh. An Indian intelligence officer said the confrontation occurred after Indian soldiers intercepted a Chinese patrol that veered into Indian-held territory after losing its way, apparently due to bad weather.

On 9 October 2017, China announced that it was ready to maintain peace at the frontiers in response to Indian Defence Minister Nirmala Sitharaman's visit to Nathu La.

== Disengagement ==
On 28 August 2017, India and China announced that they had agreed to pull their troops back from the face-off in Doklam. By the end of the day, it was reported that the withdrawal was completed.

The Indian troops withdrew to their original positions at the outpost at Doka La, located in a militarily advantageous position on the Bhutanese border, less than 500 meters away down the ridge slope. The Times of India, citing a source, reported: "Our soldiers sit on the top, hold the ridge and can swiftly intervene, as they pro-actively did in mid-June, if the People's Liberation Army once again tries to unilaterally change the status quo by constructing a road near the Sikkim-Bhutan-Tibet tri-junction."

The Ministry of External Affairs (MEA) of India released a press statement stating that India and China had mutually agreed to disengage. It said that India and China had maintained diplomatic communication in recent weeks and that India was able to convey its "concerns and interests". In Beijing, the foreign ministry spokeswoman stated that the Chinese forces on site have verified that the Indian troops pulled out, implying that Chinese troop numbers would be reduced. She said that the Chinese troops would continue to patrol the area, to garrison it and to exercise "sovereign rights". However, she made no mention of road-building activities. The statement from the Chinese Foreign Ministry spokesman, as The Diplomat reported, "offered Beijing a face-saving way out of the impasse."

The Indian MEA issued a second statement later in the day that both sides have withdrawn "under verification". The Indian news channel NDTV reported that, by the end of the day, Chinese road-building equipment was removed from the face-off site. Some experts warned that one shouldn't be overly optimistic, as another standoff is entirely possible.

The Washington Post commented that it was unclear if China had offered any concessions in return for the Indian withdrawal, such as agreeing to halt road construction. It said that the deal allowed both sides to save face. However, China was continuing to be "cagey" in its official remarks. Al Jazeera said that China was not giving up its historical claims and it expected India to respect its "historical borders". Scholar Taylor Fravel pointed out that there are plenty of options available to China to garrison the area other than extending the road.

On 29 August, Bhutan welcomed the disengagement and hoped that it would lead to the maintenance of peace and tranquility as well as the status quo along the borders.

On 5 September, Prime Minister Narendra Modi and President Xi Jinping held hour-long discussions on the sidelines of the BRICS summit. They agreed on a "forward-looking" approach and vowed to make efforts to ensure that situations like the Doklam standoff do not recur. They reaffirmed that maintaining peace and tranquility in the border areas was essential for the relations between the two countries.

On 7 September, some media reports claimed that both nations' troops still were patrolling the area at the face-off site, simply having moved 150 metres back from their previous position.

== Bhutanese reaction ==
After issuing a press statement on 29 June, the Bhutanese government and media maintained a studious silence. The Bhutanese clarified that the territory on which China was building a road was "Bhutanese territory" that was being claimed by China, and it is part of the ongoing border negotiations. It defended the policy of silence followed by the Bhutanese government, saying "Bhutan does not want India and China to go to war, and it is avoiding doing anything that can heat up an already heated situation."

However, ENODO Global, a risk management firm, having done a study of social media interactions in Bhutan, recommended that the government should "proactively engage" with citizens and avoid a disconnect between leaders and populations. ENODO found considerable anxiety among the populace regarding the risk of war between India and China, and the possibility of annexation by China similar to that of Tibet in 1951. It found a strengthening of Bhutanese resolve, identity and nationalism, not wanting to be "pushovers".

The New York Times said that it encountered more people concerned about India's actions than China's. It found expressions of sovereignty and concern that an escalation of the border conflict would hurt trade and diplomatic relations with China. Scholar Rudra Chaudhuri, having toured the country, noted that Doklam was not as important an issue for the Bhutanese as it might have been ten years ago. Rather, the Bhutanese viewed a border settlement with China as the top priority for the country. While he noticed terms such as "pro-Chinese" and "anti-Indian" were often used, he said that what they meant was not well-understood.

== Media reactions and misinformation ==
On 7 July 2017, the Chinese state-run Xinhua News Agency ran an article titled "demystifying the truth" about the stand-off, where it claimed that India had illegally entered Chinese territory on the pretext of protecting Bhutan without disclosing that the region was disputed which was evident in the 1988 and 1998 agreements between Bhutan and PRC. This discrepancy was also pointed out by an assistant professor at the Shanghai University, Dr. Rajiv Ranjan.

On 21 July 2017, another Chinese state-run agency, Global Times, published an editorial accusing the then Indian External Affairs Minister Sushma Swaraj of misrepresenting the standoff and characterising India’s actions as an incursion into Chinese territory. The editorial also made a claim that India's actions had drawn international criticism. In contrast, Swaraj's actual statement was addressing the Indian Parliament on India’s position as a response to concerns over Chinese road construction near the Doklam Tri-junction, whose final alignment remained unsettled as per the 2012 Border agreement between China and India.

On 16 August 2017, the Xinhua News released a segment of its show "The Spark" on Twitter, racially attacking India. A video named the "Seven Sins of India" portrayed a stereotypical Indian with a turban and beard and a typical Indian accent. The segment spoke of Indians having "thick skin" and "pretending to sleep" on the matter of the border standoff between the two countries. The video went on to claim India was physically threatening Bhutan, and compared India to a "robber who breaks into a house and does not leave". The video received strong backlash on Twitter as well as from the international media.

== Other ==
India pays Beijing for supplying data on cross-border flows of the Brahmaputra River. During the standoff, which coincided with the peak flood season, China refused to transmit this data to India, saying that the measuring stations had been washed away.

== See also ==
- China–India relations
- Bhutan–China relations
- Nathu La and Cho La clashes
- Siliguri Corridor
- Sino-Indian War
- Tetulia Corridor

== Bibliography ==
- China Foreign Ministry (2 August 2017), The Facts and China's Position Concerning the Indian Border Troops' Crossing of the China-India Boundary in the Sikkim Sector into the Chinese Territory (2017-08-02) (PDF), Government of China
