= Dahala (disambiguation) =

Dahala may refer to:

- Dahala Khagrabari, an Indian enclave belonging to the District of Cooch Behar in the State of West Bengal
- Chedi Kingdom, or region, also known as Dahala-mandala
  - Kalachuris of Tripuri, people populating regions of Dahala
- DaHeala, artistic name of Canadian record producer Jason Quenneville
