= Siliguri Corridor =

Narrow land corridor in Northeast India

Coordinates: 26°35′N 88°15′E

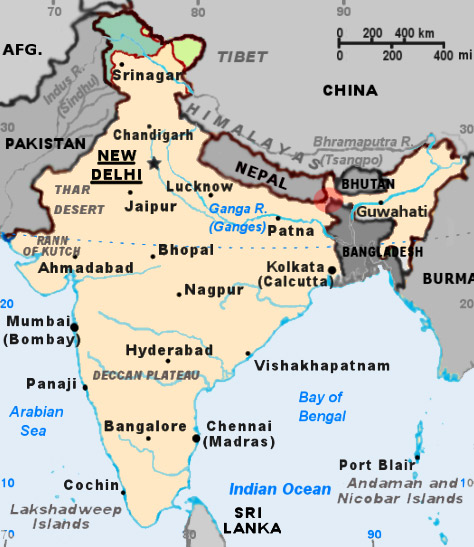
The Siliguri Corridor is the strip of Indian territory within the red highlighted circle.

Map of India illustrating Chicken's Neck, with Bangladesh’s Panchagarh District to the south and Nepal’s Jhapa District to the northwest.

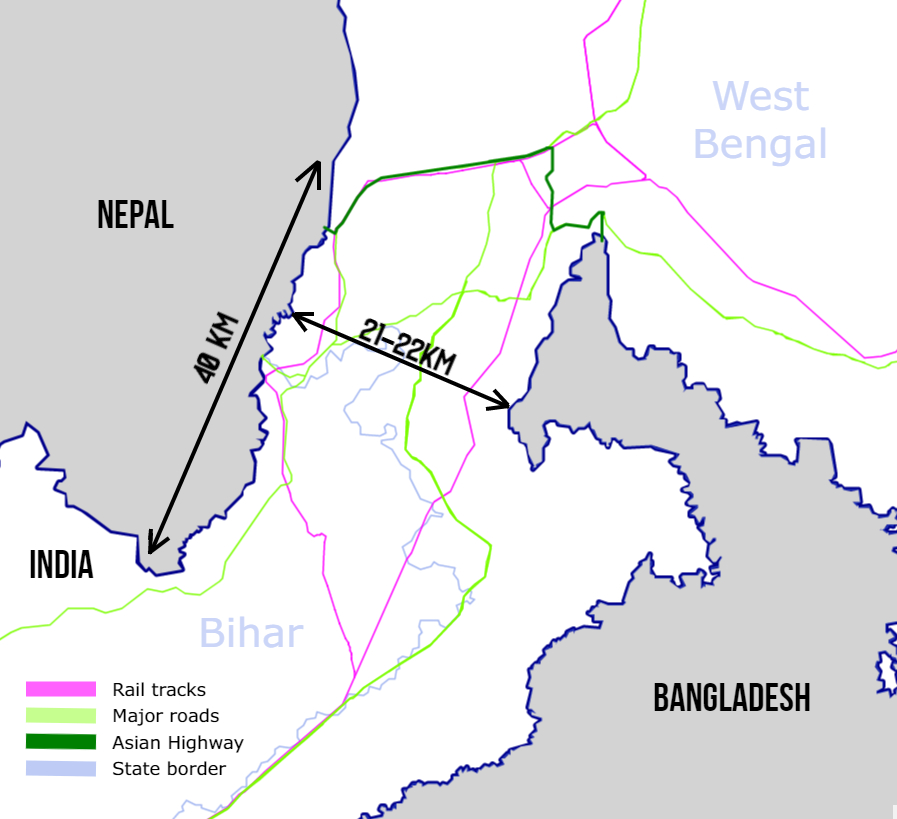
AH2 of the Asian Highway goes through the Siliguri Corridor.

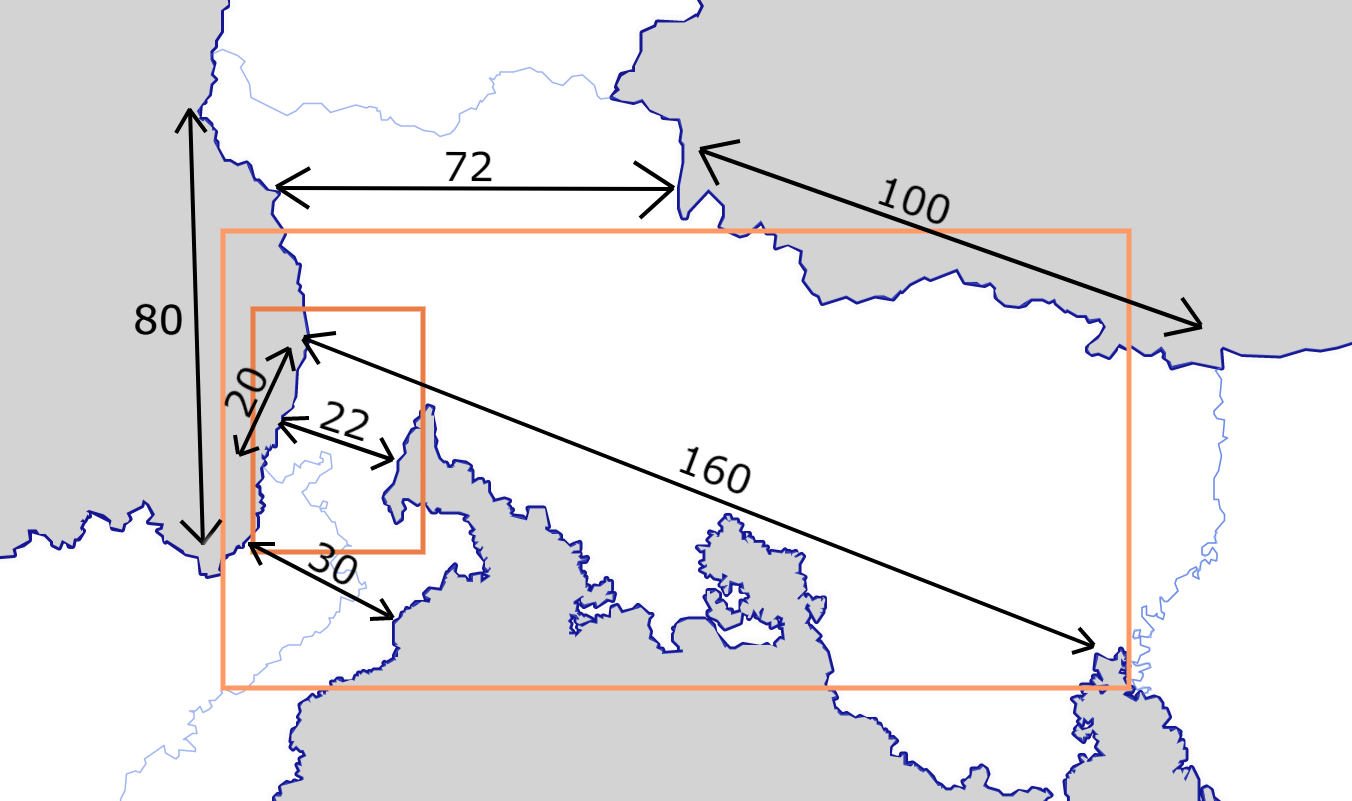
Dimensions of the corridor. Distances in kilometres.

The Siliguri Corridor, also known as the "Chicken's Neck", is a stretch of land around the city of Siliguri in West Bengal state of India. It is the sole terrestrial connection between India's mainland and its eight northeastern states, serving as a logistical lifeline for over 40 million people and crucial military movements. The corridor is bordered by Nepal, Bhutan and Bangladesh, China's Chumbi Valley in Tibet, to its northeast. The city of Siliguri is the major city in the area and the central transfer point connecting Bhutan, Nepal, Bangladesh, Sikkim, Darjeeling, Northeast India and mainland India.

== History ==
The partition of India led to the formation of the Siliguri Corridor through the creation of East Pakistan (now Bangladesh) after the partition of Bengal (into East Bengal and West Bengal) in 1947–1948.

The Kingdom of Sikkim formerly lay on the northern side of the corridor, until its union with India in 1975 via a publicly held referendum. From Sikkim, India consolidated its control of the Chumbi Valley, along with Bhutan.

== Geography ==
The dimensions of the corridor are a matter of interpretation. Descriptions give it an area of 170 by 60 km (106 by 37 mi) with the narrowest section being 20–22 km (12–14 mi). Kamal Jit Singh places the length at 200 km (120 mi) with a width of 17 to 60 km (11 to 37 mi), giving it an area of approximately 12,200 km^{2} (4,700 sq mi). Another description places its dimensions as approximately 200 km (120 mi) in length and 20 to 60 km (12 to 37 mi) wide, also giving it an area of approximately 12,200 km^{2} (4,700 sq mi).

The corridor is located between Bangladesh to the southeast, Nepal on the northwest, and Bhutan to the north. Between Sikkim and Bhutan lies the Chumbi Valley Tibetan territory. The southern end of the Dolam plateau or Doklam tri boundary area slopes into the corridor. At the narrowest stretch, the corridor is generally formed by the Mechi River in the east; Nepal's Bhadrapur lies on the banks of the river. Further north the Mechi Bridge connects Mechinagar.

== Vulnerability mitigation by India ==
To mitigate its vulnerability India has undertaken several initiatives including enhanced security deployment and infrastructure development. To ensure seamless connectivity and military mobilisation, India has prioritised developing high-capacity infrastructure in and around the corridor, notably under the Bharatmala Pariyojana. Projects include:

- Corridor Enhancement: Upgrading of major broad-gauge railway lines and highways to increase freight capacity and reduce transit time.
- Alternative Routes: Exploration and development of alternative connectivity solutions to reduce reliance on the single-access corridor, including the proposed Hili–Mahendraganj Corridor and the Kaladan Multimodal Transit Corridor through Myanmar.
- Future Infrastructure: Consideration of subterranean infrastructure (tunnels) within the corridor to enhance security and reduce exposure to external threats.

=== Connectivity ===
India has embarked on a slew of projects. These include the construction of India-China Border Roads, where, as of 2024, multiple phases of border roads have been constructed, and Advance Landing Grounds (ALGs), such as the Nyoma Advanced Landing Ground, which is nearing completion as of 2024. Other projects include Northeastern India connectivity and Look-East transnational connectivity projects including BIMSTEC and BBIN to create multiple alternatives to the Silliguri corridor, including through Bangladesh and the sea.

All land transportation between the rest of India and its far northeastern states use this corridor. The route has a major broad gauge railway line. Electrification of this double-track corridor is in progress with assistance from the Central Organization for Railway Electrification (CORE). Additionally, the old metre gauge line (recently converted to a 1.676 metres (5 ft 6.0 in) broad-gauge line) connects Siliguri Junction with Islampur in the North Dinajpur district of West Bengal, via Bagdogra (the only airport of national interest in the corridor) and the bordering towns of Adhikari, Galgalia, Thakurganj, Naxalbari and Taiabpur with Nepal. As of 2024, to reduce dependence on the Siliguri Corridor, India is planning to build railway lines through Jogbani in Bihar, which would enter Biratnagar in Nepal and then connect with New Mal Junction in West Bengal. In 2024, India also began developing railway lines through Bangladesh; this project includes the construction of new railway tracks and the gauge conversion of existing railway tracks, in order to reduce dependence on the Siliguri Corridor.

As of 2024, there is no free-trade agreement between Bangladesh and India. The Tetulia Corridor, an alternative to the Siliguri Corridor, is proposed under Article VIII of the 1980 India–Bangladesh Trade Agreement, which states that "The two governments agree to make mutually beneficial arrangements for the use of their waterways, railways and roadways for commerce between the two countries and for passage of goods between two places in one country through the territory of the other". However, the opening of the Tetulia Corridor is still being discussed politically as of 2019.

=== Security ===
The threat of a Chinese advance is still considered by Indian planners. A Chinese military advance of less than 130 km (81 mi) would cut off Bhutan, part of West Bengal and all of Northeast India, an area containing almost 50 million people. This situation arose in 1962 during the war between India and China. The security threat to this corridor was heightened during the 2017 Doklam incident. The probability of China cutting off seven states in northeast India has been questioned. The Indian Army has said that the Siliguri Corridor is the Army's strongest defensive line.

==== Military Bases and Deployment ====
India has several forces stationed on its borders: the Indian Army and Indo-Tibetan Border Police man the border with China, Sashastra Seema Bal is deployed along the border with Nepal and Bhutan, and the Border Security Force is stationed at the border of Bangladesh. The strip is also patrolled by the Indian Army, the Assam Rifles, and state police forces, including the West Bengal Police. The security threat posed by the corridor decreased following the creation of Bangladesh in 1971. However, numerous internal threats to the corridor still exist. Militant groups known to have used the corridor include the United Liberation Front of Assam (ULFA) and the National Socialist Council of Nagaland (NSCN).

- Advanced defensive assets already stationed in the area include air defence systems (such as the S-400), a BrahMos missile regiment and a squadron of the Indian Air Force's Rafale fighter aircraft based at Hasimara Air Force Station.
- The corridor and the surrounding region are secured by multiple military formations, primarily the Indian Army's Trishakti Corps (XXXIII Corps), which guards the corridor and the state of Sikkim. In a significant move to reinforce its eastern frontier, India established three new military garrisons in late 2025 to boost surveillance, readiness, and coordination with the Border Security Force (BSF):
  - Lachit Borphukan Military Station at Bamunigaon (near Dhubri, Assam). This is the first major Army base near the Bangladesh border in Assam.
  - Forward Bases at Kishanganj (Bihar) and Chopra (West Bengal), which are intended for rapid troop deployment and intelligence coordination.

== In popular culture ==
Humphrey Hawksley, in his 2000 novel Dragon Fire, briefly authors a situation where China cuts off India's land route to its northeastern territories. Assassin's Mace (2011) by Brigadier Bob Butalia also involves such a situation involving Doklam and Jaldhaka River.

== See also ==
- Chicken's neck, disambiguation
- Suwałki Gap

== Notes ==
Bibliography

- Ghosh, Atig (2018). "The Importance of Being Siliguri. Border-Effect and the 'Untimely' City in North Bengal". In Neilson, Brett; Rossiter, Ned; Samaddar, Ranabir (eds.). Logistical Asia: The Labour of Making a World Region. Palgrave Macmillan, Springer. ISBN 9789811083334. LCCN 2018935185.
