= Abid Ali (politician) =

Bangladeshi politician

- আবিদ আলী

Member of 1st Jatiya Sangsad
- In office 1973–1979
- Succeeded by: Kazi Nuruzzaman
- Constituency: Rangpur-5

Personal details
- Born: 30 April 1935 Jagatber, Jalpaiguri district, Bengal Presidency
- Died: 2001 (aged 65–66) Bangladesh
- Party: Awami League

Abid Ali (Bengali: আবিদ আলী; 30 April 1935 – 2001) was a Bangladeshi politician who was the MP for Rangpur-5.

== Early life and family ==
Ali was born on 30 April 1935 to a Bengali family in the village of Jagatber in Patgram thana, Jalpaiguri district, Bengal Presidency (now in Lalmonirhat District, Bangladesh).

== Career ==
In the 1970 East Pakistan Provincial Assembly election, Ali was elected for the Rangpur-V constituency. He participated in the Bangladesh Liberation War.

Ali was elected to the first Jatiya Sangsad from Rangpur-5 as an Awami League candidate after the inaugural 1973 Bangladeshi general election.
