= Bangalipara =

- Village
- Location in Assam, India Bangalipara (India)
- Coordinates: 26.77°N 91.72°E
- Country: India
- State: Assam
- Region: Bodoland
- District: Baksa

Government
  - Body: Village Council Development Committee, VCDC

Languages
  - Official: Assamese language|Assamese]]
- Time zone: UTC+5:30 (IST)
- PIN: 781364
- Vehicle registration: AS
- Website: baksa.nic.in

Bangalipara is a village in Baksa District, Bodoland Territorial Region, Assam situated in north bank of river Brahmaputra. It falls on the foothills of Bhutan with the border area at a 6 km approx. distance. Bogamati a famous picnic stop is located in the same place where the Indo-Bhutan border starts.

== Transport ==
The village is well connected to nearby towns like Goreswar, Rangiya and Baihata by state PWD roads and Guwahati by National Highway 31 which connects at Baihata Chariali with regular buses and other modes of transportation throughout the day. The nearest railway station in Goreswar (20 km) and nearest junction is Rangiya (35 km).

== Education ==
The village has numerous schools including one Government High and M.E. School and other private schools. Jnanjyoti Jatiya Vidyalaya is one of the renowned school of the village with competitive results in HSLC exams. A private English school by the name Daffodils English School is also known to all in the area. Nearest junior colleges are at Naokata and Goreswar town.

== Insurgency ==
The village is one of the highly impacted areas during the Bodoland Movement which in recent times has ceded and there are fewer instances of violence related to the movement. The Bodoland administration is taking great measures in bringing harmony among the communities staying in the area.

== Demographics ==
The composition of linguistic communities is mostly of Nepali, Bodo and Assamese speaking people. There are also Bengali, Tea tribe and Garo communities in some hamlets of the village.

== Flora and Fauna ==
Being in proximity with the forests of Bhutan the area has a good forest cover and numerous streams flow from the hills of Bhutan. Due to depletion of forest for farming (Mostly tea cultivation) and increase in Banana plantations the area is prone to Human-Elephant conflict. Areas like Deosunga, Rajagarh, Dongar gaon have repeated instances of attack by elephants who move in search of food.

Picnic Spot - Almost 5-7 Km drive from Bangalipara there is a famous picnic Spot Bogamati, which attracts thousands of Tourist every year. This place is well known for rafting and Picnic.

== See also ==
- Balisatra
