= Maghval =

Maghval Megwal Meghwad
- village
- Dadra and Nagar Haveli map in grey depicting the Gujarati enclave village of Maghval in cream

- Location in Gujarat, India Maghval (India)
- Coordinates: 20.21°N 73.02°E
- Country: India
- State: Gujarat
- District: Valsad district
- Elevation: 16 m (52 ft)

Population (2011)
  - Total: 2,678

Languages
  - Official: Gujarati, Marathi
- Time zone: UTC+5:30 (IST)
- PIN: 396240
- Vehicle registration: GJ
- Nearest city: Silvassa

Maghval, also known as Megwal and Meghwad, is a village in the Kaparada taluka of Valsad district in Gujarat State, India. It is a small counterenclave belonging to Gujarat, just south of Silvassa within Nagar Haveli which is an enclave in Gujarat and part of the Indian union territory of Dadra and Nagar Haveli and Daman and Diu.

In January 2022, the government of India announced plans for the Maghval enclave to become part of Dadra and Nagar Haveli and Daman and Diu alongside 3 other villages (which were sometimes isolated from the rest of Gujarat, but not from Dadra and Nagar Haveli, by monsoon floods). This would allow the sale of alcohol in the villages, as alcohol is restricted in Gujarat. This process was later deferred.

== Geography ==
Maghval, though under the administrative purview of Gujarat, is surrounded by the union territory of Dadra and Nagar Haveli and Daman and Diu (DNHDD), outside the state boundary and a few kilometres from Silvassa in DNHDD. The village with 2,160 villagers (as of February 2018) has a rich landscape with the Daman Ganga River cutting through it, leaving a hilly stretch on one side and plains on the other.

== History ==
Formerly "Bombay Enclave", Maghval was a British counter-enclave within the Portuguese enclave within British India until independence.

== See also ==
- India–Bangladesh enclaves
- List of enclaves and exclaves
