= Tin Bigha Corridor =

Strip of land leased to Bangladesh by India

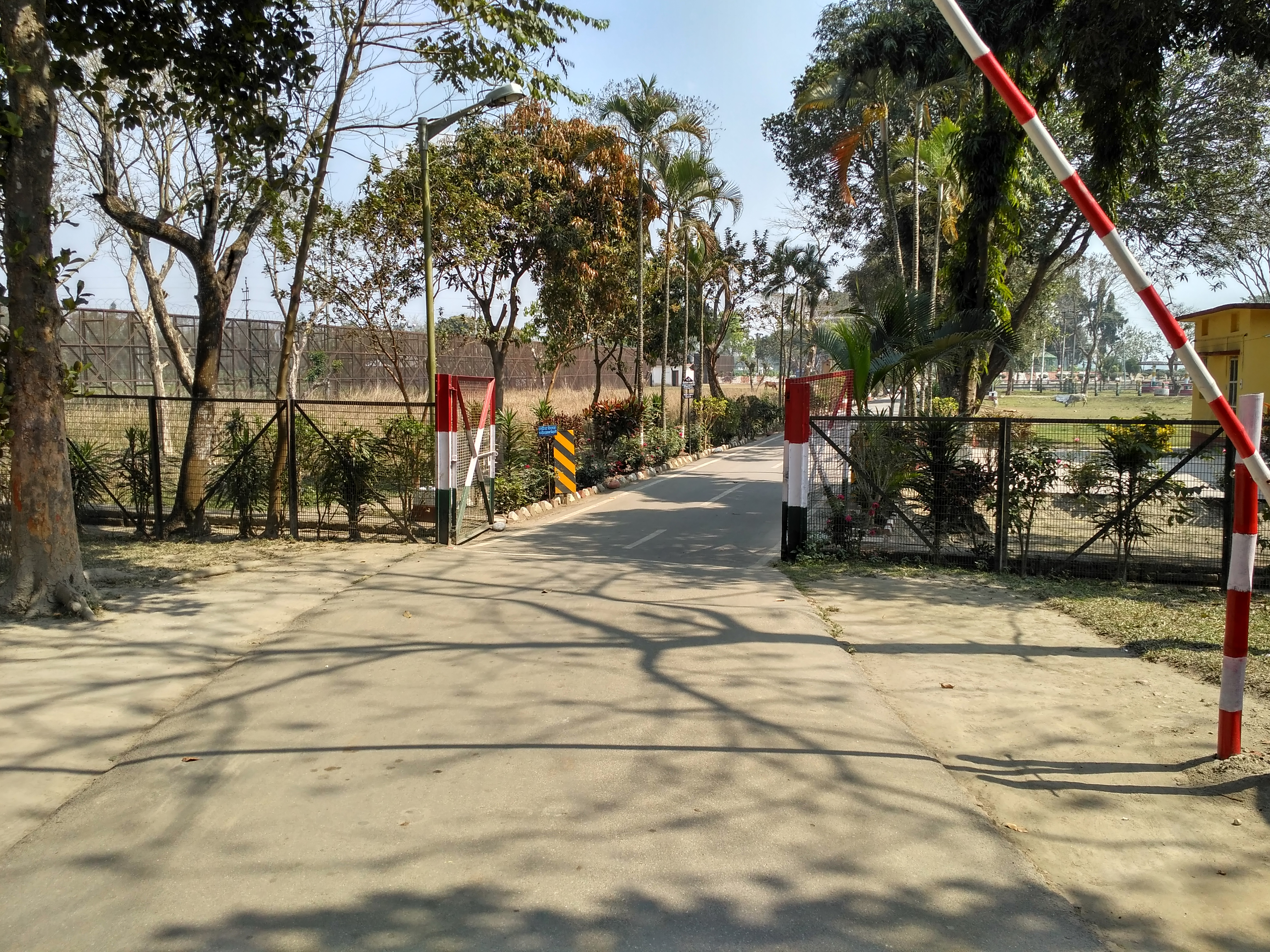
- Entrance of Tin Bigha Corridor from Mainland

- Location in Rangpur Division Tin Bigha Corridor (Bangladesh)
- Coordinates: 26°18′1″N 88°56′43″E

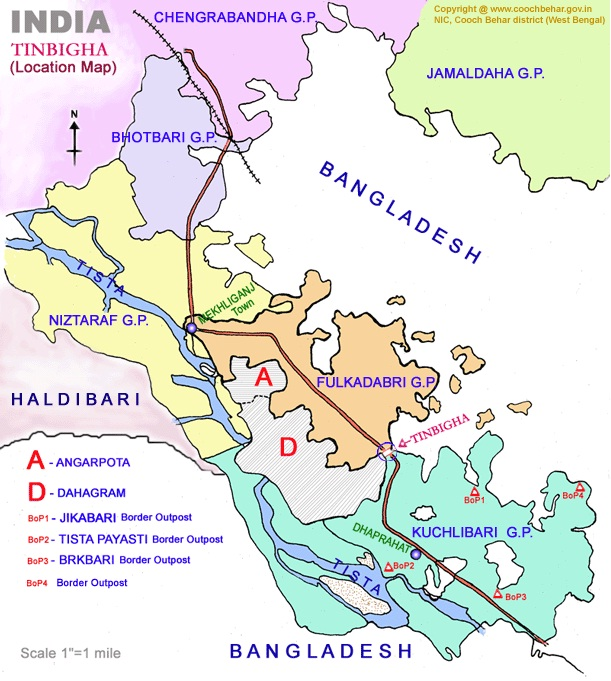
Tin (or Teen) Bigha Corridor Map

The Tin (or Teen) Bigha Corridor (Bengali: তিনবিঘা করিডর; transl. Three Bigha Corridor) is a road or strip of land belonging to India on the West Bengal–Bangladesh border which, in September 2011, was leased to Bangladesh so the country could access its Dahagram–Angarpota enclave from the mainland. The enclave remains the only one still in existence after the 2015 resolution of the India–Bangladesh enclaves issue. It is situated in the town of Patgram Upazila.

== History ==
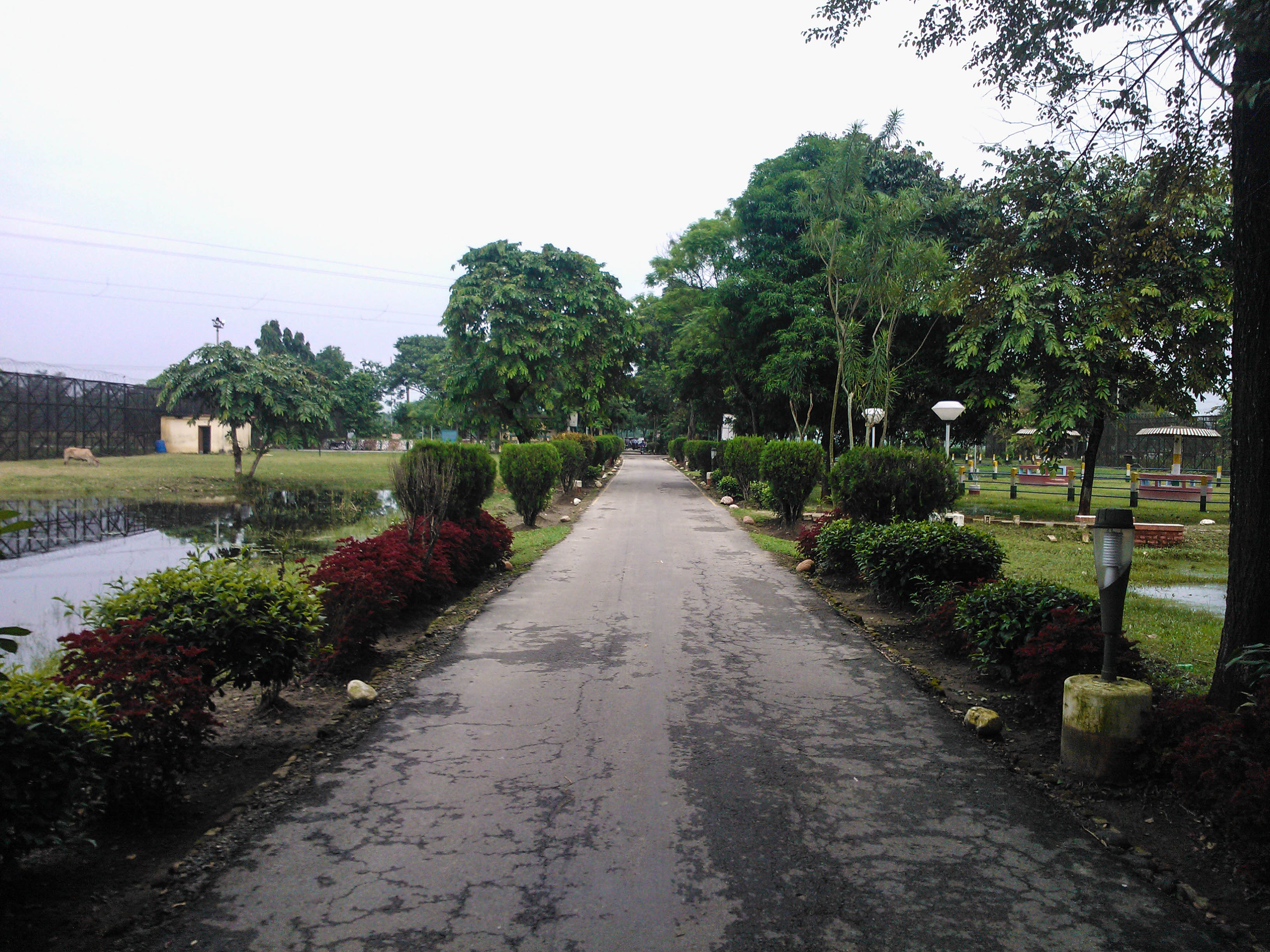
Road connecting Dahagram-Angarpota enclave with mainland Bangladesh.

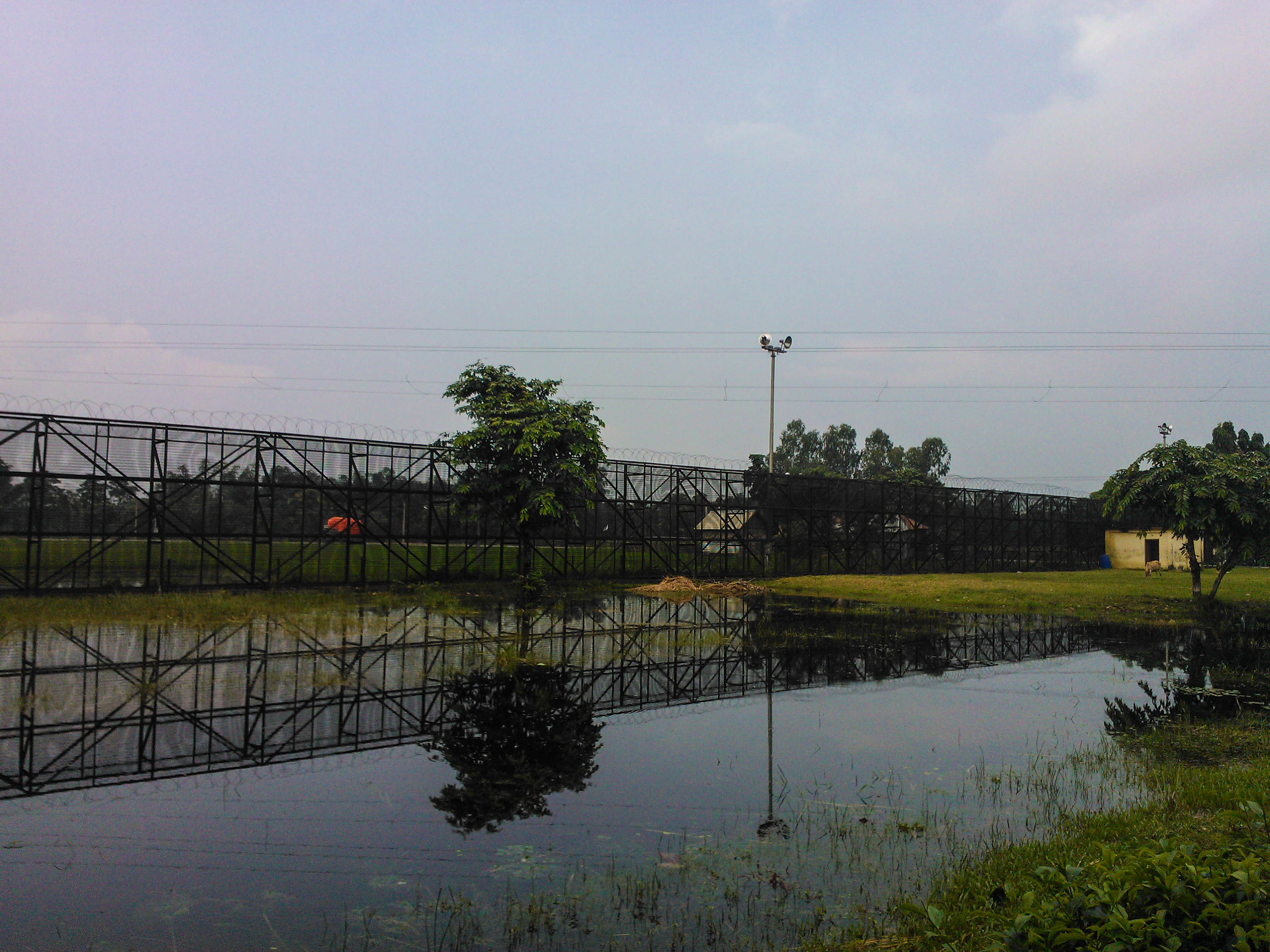
The border fence around Tin Bigha Corridor.

According to the Indira Gandhi-Sheikh Mujibur Rahman treaty of 16 May 1974, India and Bangladesh were to hand over the sovereignty of the Tin Bigha Corridor (178 by 85 metres (584 ft × 279 ft)) and South Berubari (7.39 km^{2} (2.85 sq mi)) to each other, thereby allowing access to the Dahagram–Angarpota enclaves and the Indian enclaves adjacent to South Berubari. Bangladesh did hand over the sovereignty of the smaller South Berubari to India instantly in 1974. India, however, could not transfer the Tin Bigha Corridor to Bangladesh as it required constitutional amendment which could not be done due to political reasons.

After much Bangladesh government protest, India, instead of handing over sovereignty in 2011, proposed to lease the Tin Bigha Corridor to Bangladesh for a certain time. South Berubari, meanwhile, would remain in the possession of India.

The total area of South Berubari Union No. 12 is 22.58 km^{2} (8.72 sq mi) of which 11.29 km^{2} (4.36 sq mi) was to go to Bangladesh. The area of the four Cooch Behar enclaves which would also have to go to Bangladesh was 6.84 km^{2} (2.64 sq mi) making the total area to be transferred 18.13 km^{2} (7.00 sq mi). The population of the area including the four enclaves to be transferred, as per 1967 data, was 90% Hindu. The Bangladesh enclaves, Dahagram and Angorpota, were to be transferred to India. Their total area was 18.68 km^{2} (7.21 sq mi) and as per 1967 data more than 80% of their population was Muslim. If this exchange had gone through, it would have meant a change of nationality for the population or migration of the population from Dahagram and Angorpota and South Berubari Union No. 12 and consequent serious rehabilitation problems. There were in any case major agitations by the people of Berubari protesting against the transfer.

After 1971, India proposed to Bangladesh that India may continue to retain the southern half of South Berubari Union No. 12 and the adjacent enclaves and, in exchange, Dahagram and Angorpota may be retained by Bangladesh. As part of the package a strip of land would be leased in perpetuity by India to Bangladesh, giving access to Dahagram and Angorpota to enable Bangladesh to exercise sovereignty on these two enclaves. This was accepted by Bangladesh as part of a carefully constructed Land Boundary Agreement signed by Prime Minister Indira Gandhi and Prime Minister Sheikh Mujibur Rahman on 16 May 1974. The Berubari dispute was thus finally resolved by Article 1.14 of the Agreement which stated:

"India will retain the southern half of South Berubari Union No. 12 and the adjacent enclaves, measuring an area of 6.8 km^{2} (2.64 sq mi) approximately, and in exchange Bangladesh will retain the Dahagram and Angorpota enclaves. India will lease in perpetuity to Bangladesh an area of 178 by 85 metres (584 ft × 279 ft) near 'Tin Bigha' to connect Dahagram with Panbari Mouza (P.S. Patgram) of Bangladesh."

== Etymology ==
Tin is the word for the numeral "three" in Bengali, and bigha is a unit of area ranging from 1,500 to 6,771 m^{2} (16,150–72,880 sq ft).

== Access to corridor ==
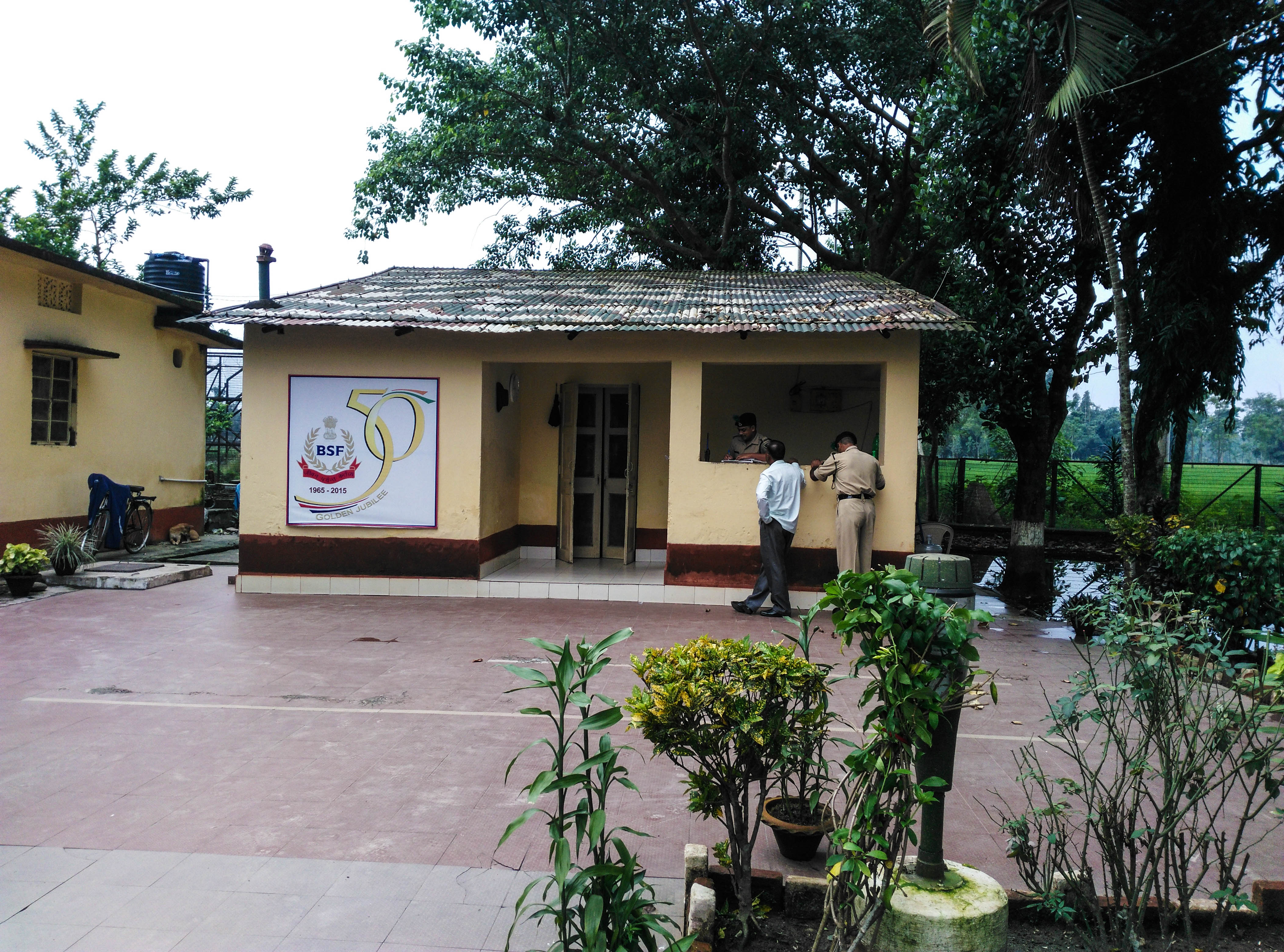
Indian BSF Camp at Tin Bigha Corridor.

The corridor was previously open for 12 daylight hours only, causing great hardships for the inhabitants of the enclave, given that the enclave had no hospitals or law enforcement facilities.

Following a treaty signed by the Prime Ministers of India and Bangladesh on 6 September 2011 in Dhaka, it was agreed that the corridor would be open for 24 hours for Bangladeshis in the enclave to access the mainland.

The corridor was officially declared open by the Bangladesh Premier Sheikh Hasina on 19 October 2011.

== Infrastructure ==
Until recently, the enclaves had no hospitals or colleges. Former Bangladesh Prime Minister Sheikh Hasina inaugurated a ten-bed Dahagram Hospital and the Dahagram Union Parishad Complex on 19 October 2011.

== See also ==
- Tetulia Corridor
- Enclaves and exclaves
