= Kazi Nuruzzaman (politician) =

Bangladeshi politicians

Member of Bangladesh Parliament
- In office 1979–1986
- Preceded by: Abid Ali
- Succeeded by: H. N. Ashequr Rahman

Personal details
- Died: 5 December 2017 Patagram, Bangladesh
- Political party: Bangladesh Nationalist Party

Kazi Nuruzzaman was a Bangladesh Nationalist Party politician and member of parliament for Rangpur-5.

== Career ==
Nuruzzaman was elected to parliament from Rangpur-5 (now Lalmonirhat-1) as a Bangladesh Nationalist Party candidate in 1979. He died on 5 December 2017 in Patagram.
