= Dahala Khagrabari =

Former Indian enclave

Coordinates: 26°08′59″N 88°45′43″E

Dahala Khagrabari was the only third-order enclave in the world.

Dahala Khagrabari (#51) (Bengali: দাহালা খাগড়াবাড়ী (#৫১)) was an Indian enclave located on the Bangladesh–India border belonging to the district of Cooch Behar in the state of West Bengal. This was a piece of India within a piece of Bangladesh within a piece of India within Bangladesh, making it the only third-order enclave (or counter-counter enclave) in the world until 1 August 2015, when it was ceded to Bangladesh.

At 7,000 square metres (1.7 acres)— approximately the size of an association football field— it was one of the smallest of the India–Bangladesh enclaves: 106 Indian exclaves inside Bangladesh and 92 Bangladeshi exclaves inside India.

== Overview ==
Dahala Khagrabari (#51) was completely encircled by the Bangladeshi village of 'Upanchowki Bhajni, 110' itself contained in the Indian village of Balapara Khagrabari, itself contained in the Debiganj, Rangpur Division, Bangladesh. Thus, Dahala Khagrabari was the enclave of an enclave of an enclave. In practice, it was a parcel of land used for farming and was not actually inhabited. It was separated by a few metres of Bangladeshi land from its first-order Indian enclave.

The owner of this enclave was a Bangladeshi farmer who lived in the enclave surrounding Dahala Khagrabari (#51).

Despite its small size, Dahala Khagrabari (#51) was not the smallest of the enclaves found on the Bangladesh–India border, the smallest being Panisala No. 79, an Indian enclave of 1,090 square metres (0.27 acres) in the Rangpur Division of Bangladesh.

Because of a lack of governance and unfavourable conditions faced by residents of the enclaves, in September 2011 the governments of India and Bangladesh announced their intention to resolve the issue by means of swapping 162 enclaves, giving residents a choice of nationality. On 6 May 2015, India ratified the Land Boundary Agreement and agreed to cede the enclave to Bangladesh.

== See also ==
- India–Bangladesh enclaves
