= Dahagram–Angarpota =

Bangladeshi enclave in India

Dahagram
- Enclave
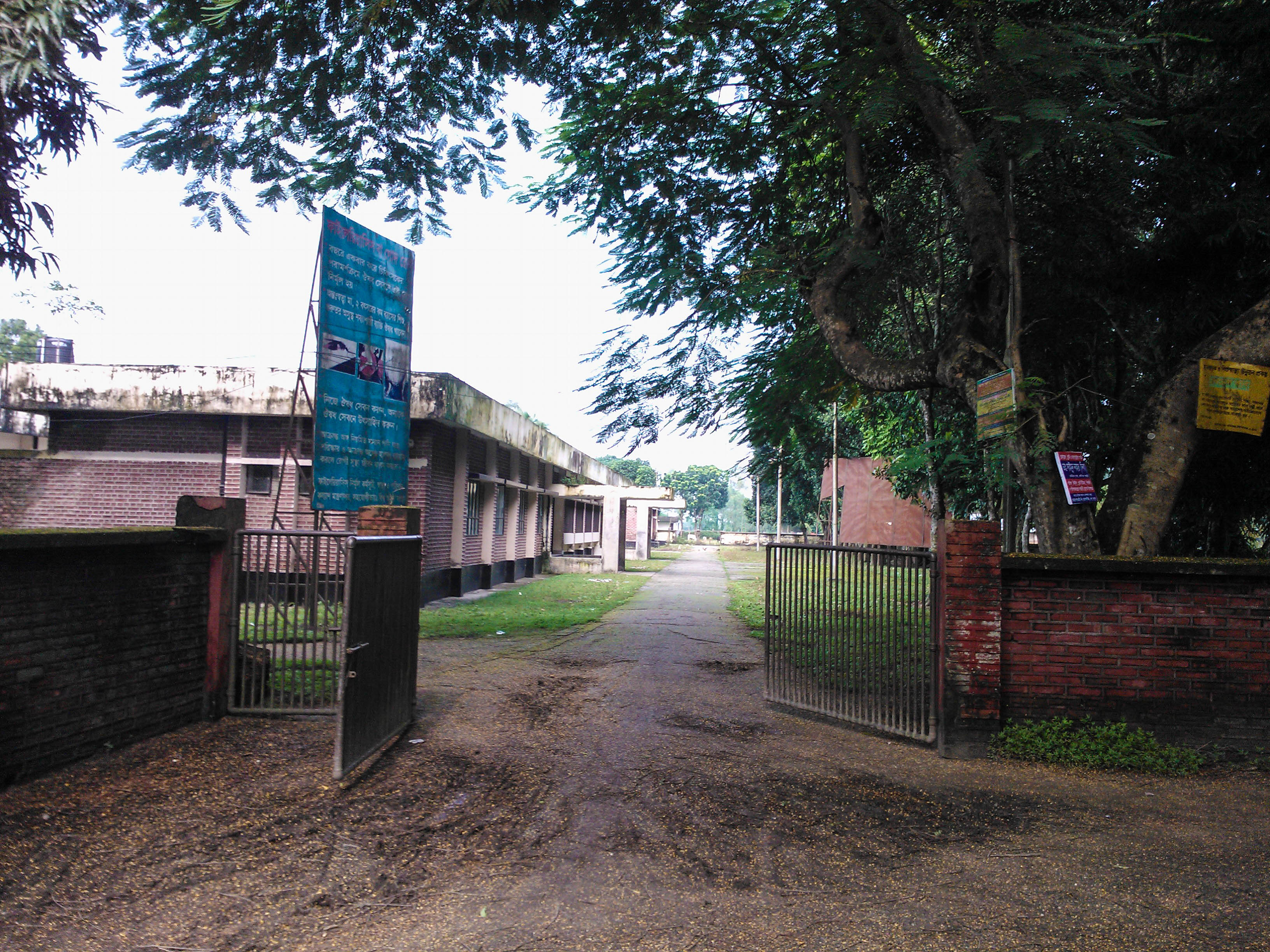
- Ten-bed Dahagram Hospital

- Map of Dahagram Upazila in Bangladesh Dahagram (Bangladesh)
- Coordinates: 26°18′1″N 88°56′43″E
- Country: Bangladesh

Population (2011)
  - Total: 10,040

Dahagram–Angarpota is a Bangladeshi enclave in India about 200 m (660 ft) away from the border of Bangladesh. It had a population of 17,000 people in 2014. Dahagram–Angarpota was the second-largest enclave and the largest Bangladeshi enclave among historical Indo-Bangladesh enclaves, and it is the only remaining enclave left after a land swap in 2015. It is connected to mainland Bangladesh by the Tin Bigha Corridor, which is situated in Patgram Upazila of Lamonirhat district. It is surrounded by Cooch Behar district of India's West Bengal state. The Teesta river flows on its western side.

== History ==
In 1954 Pakistan and India signed a treaty over the Dahagram–Angarpota and Berubari enclaves. Dahagram–Angarpota, according to the treaty, was meant to go to Pakistan, while Berubari was to be divided, with North Berubari going to India and South Berubari to Pakistan. However, the treaty was not ratified as it faced legal challenges in India.

In 1971, Bangladesh became independent from Pakistan, and Bangladesh and India proceeded to sign a new border treaty, the Indira-Mujib pact. This treaty protected the status of Dahagram–Angarpota, and in return, Bangladesh gave India the whole of Berubari village. The treaty was challenged in Bangladeshi courts, but the matter was resolved quickly, and the treaty was ratified in 1974.

The treaty provided Bangladesh with the Tin Bigha Corridor that connected the enclave with mainland Bangladesh. The corridor started functioning in 1992, and since 2011, the corridor is open to travel for 23 hours every day, closing one hour so that the Border Security Force of India can raise the Indian flag in the corridor. BSF controls the corridor and the gates.

The area has seen limited development through the opening of a clinic, school, and market.

== Demographics ==
Dahagram Union had a population of 10,040 as per the 2011 census, living in two villages: Dahagram and Angarpota. Nearly the entire population is Muslim, with a religious minority of 56 Hindus.

== See also ==
- Bangladesh–India border
