= Patgram Upazila =

Patgram পাটগ্রাম
- Upazila
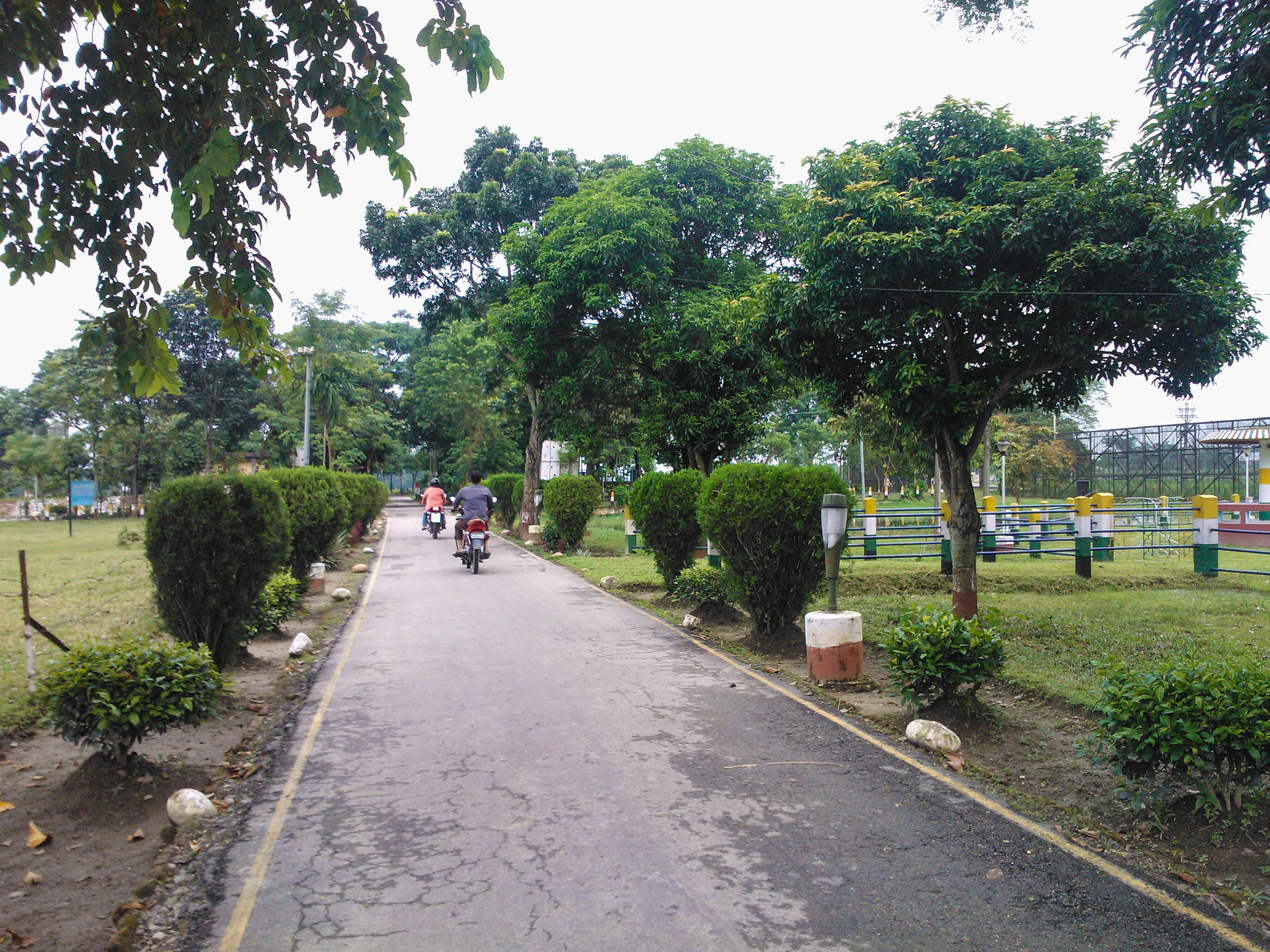
- Tin Bigha Corridor

- Coordinates: 26°21′N 89°01′E
- Country: Bangladesh
- Division: Rangpur
- District: Lalmonirhat

Area
  - Total: 246.85 km^{2} (95.31 sq mi)

Population (2022)
  - Total: 262,576
  - Density: 1,063.7/km^{2} (2,755.0/sq mi)
- Time zone: UTC+6 (BST)
- Postal code: 5540
- Website: patgram.lalmonirhat.gov.bd

Patgram Upazila mauza geocode map

Patgram (Bengali: পাটগ্রাম) is an upazila of Lalmonirhat District in Rangpur Division, far northern Bangladesh. It had 27 enclaves, most notably Dahagram–Angarpota which is connected to the Bangladeshi mainland through the Tin Bigha Corridor.

== History ==
In the late 17th century, Raja Mahendra Narayan (1682–1693) of Koch Bihar despatched an army led by Yajna Narayan and aided by the Bhutanese to subdue Mughal influence in the region. A battle occurred between the two forces in Patgram in which Narayan was defeated. In 1711, Mughal Bengal reconquered the areas of Patgram, Boda and Purbabhag from Koch rule. Under the command of Raja Rup Narayan (1693–1714), the Koches launched an attack on the Mughal faujdar of Rangpur. Although they suffered a defeat once again, Patgram, Boda and Purbabhag were retained by the Koches for a short period before being leased to the Mughals. Montgomery Martin recorded that Patgram was first established by the Mughal general Muajamkhan or Muazzam Khan as a fort on both side of the Dharla river to protect the region from Bhutanese raids.

A thana (police outpost headquarters) was established by the British East India Company in Patgram in 1801. The Jalpaiguri district was formed on 1 January 1869 and included the Chakla of Patgram. During the Partition of Bengal, Mirza Ghulam Hafiz advocated strongly for the inclusion of Patgram, Debiganj, Tetulia and Panchagarh to the Dominion of Pakistan. In accordance with the Radcliffe Line, Patgram was subsequently transferred from Jalpaiguri to the Lalmonirhat mahakuma of Rangpur district, East Bengal.

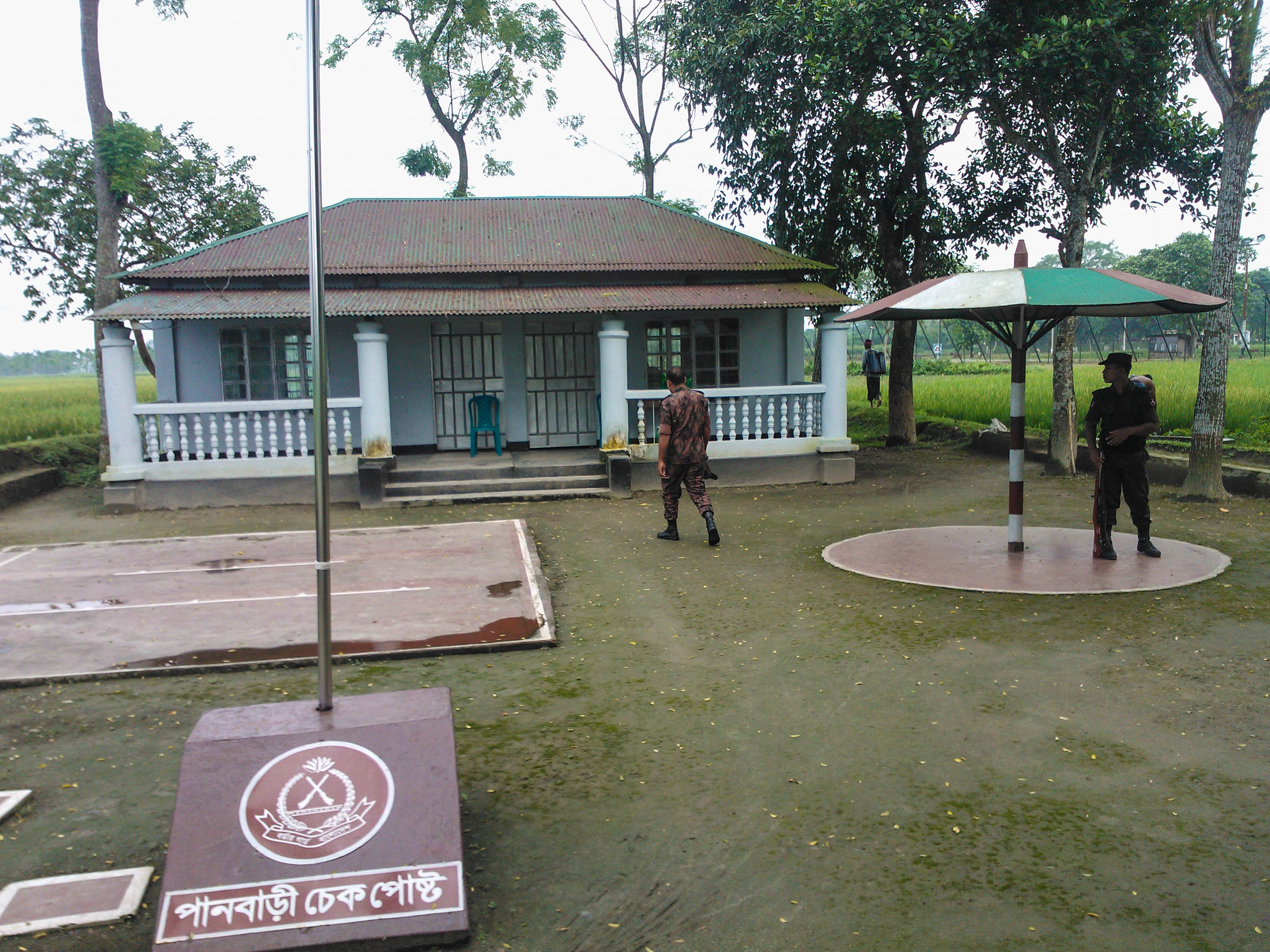
Panbari BGB check post, Patgram.

During Operation Searchlight, Bengali wing companies of the East Pakistan Rifles were posted at Patgram. Throughout the Bangladesh Liberation War of 1971, Patgram was a liberated area throughout the war and did not suffer any tragedies. Patgram was initially divided between junior commissioned officers of the East Pakistan Rifles and later taken hold by Captain Matiur Rahman. It came under Sector No. 6 led by Khademul Bashar and the Burimari area of Patgram served as the sector headquarters. Due to its peaceful environment, interim president Syed Nazrul Islam and prime minister Tajuddin Ahmad visited Patgram numerous times. Ahmad organised a public meeting in Patgram which was presided by Abid Ali and attended by the likes of Anwarul Islam Nazu.

On 18 March 1984, Patgram thana was upgraded to an upazila (sub-district) as part of the President of Bangladesh Hussain Muhammad Ershad's decentralisation programme.

== Geography ==
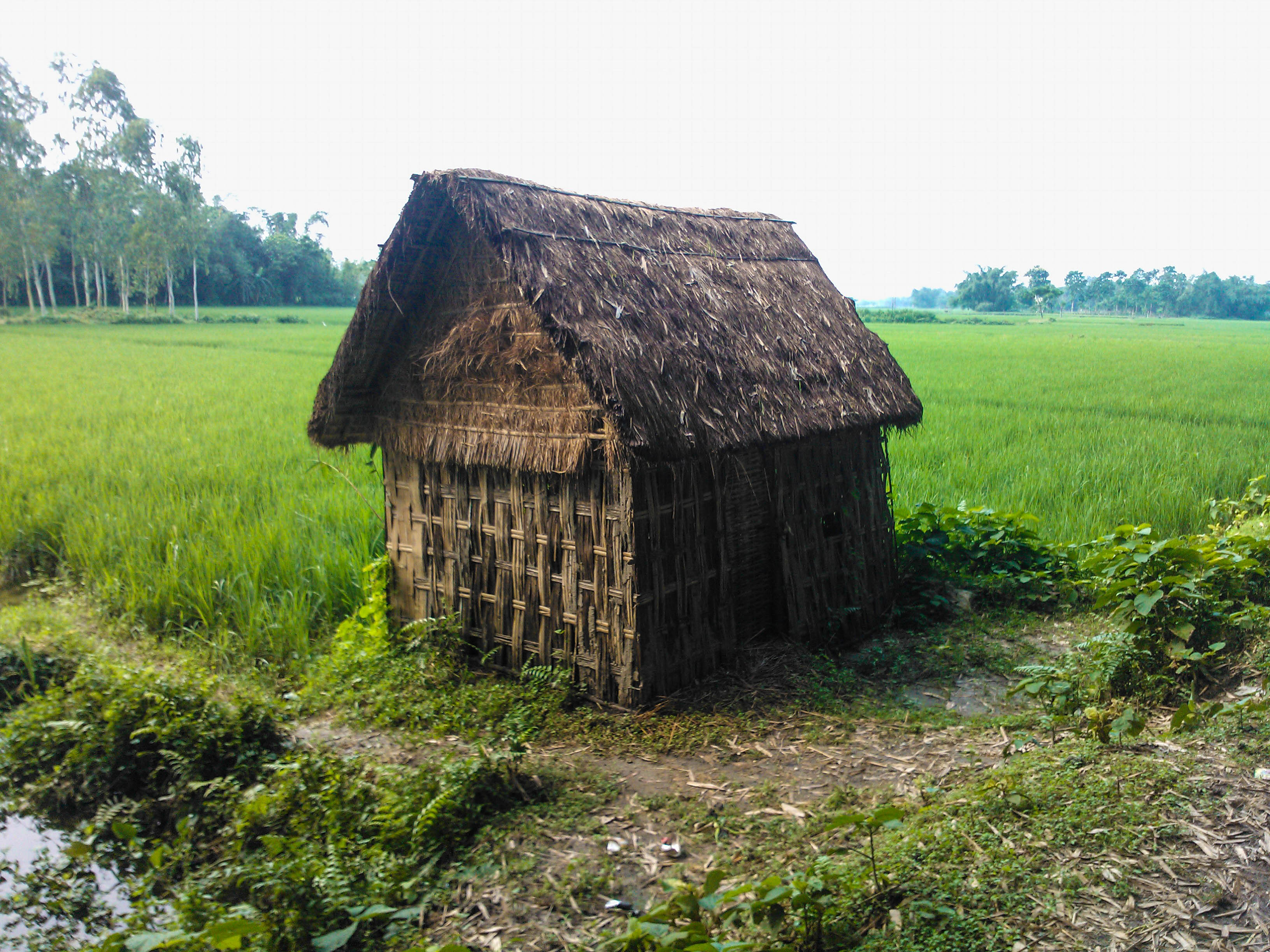
The village of Angorpota in Dahagram, Patgram

Patgram is located at 26°21′N 89°01′E. It has 47,893 households and total area 246.85 km^{2}.

== Demographics ==
Religions in Patgram Upazila (2022)
Religion	Percent
Islam	95.68%
Hinduism	4.32%
Other or not stated	0.00%

According to the 2022 Bangladeshi census, Patgram Upazila had 57,832 households and a population of 262,576. 10.33% of the population were under 5 years of age. Patgram had a literacy rate (age 7 and over) of 73.45%: 75.55% for males and 71.29% for females, and a sex ratio of 102.52 males for every 100 females. 79,597 (30.31%) lived in urban areas.

According to the 2011 Census of Bangladesh, Patgram Upazila had 47,893 households and a population of 218,615. 59,270 (27.11%) were under 10 years of age. Patgram had a literacy rate (age 7 and over) of 46.12%, compared to the national average of 51.8%, and a sex ratio of 975 females per 1000 males. 29,665 (13.57%) lived in urban areas.

As of the 1991 Bangladesh census, Patgram has a population of 155,913 with males constituting 51.52% of the population, and females 48.48%. This Upazila's eighteen up population is 75,134. Patgram has a literacy rate of 25.2%, against the national average literacy rate of 32.4%.

== Administration ==
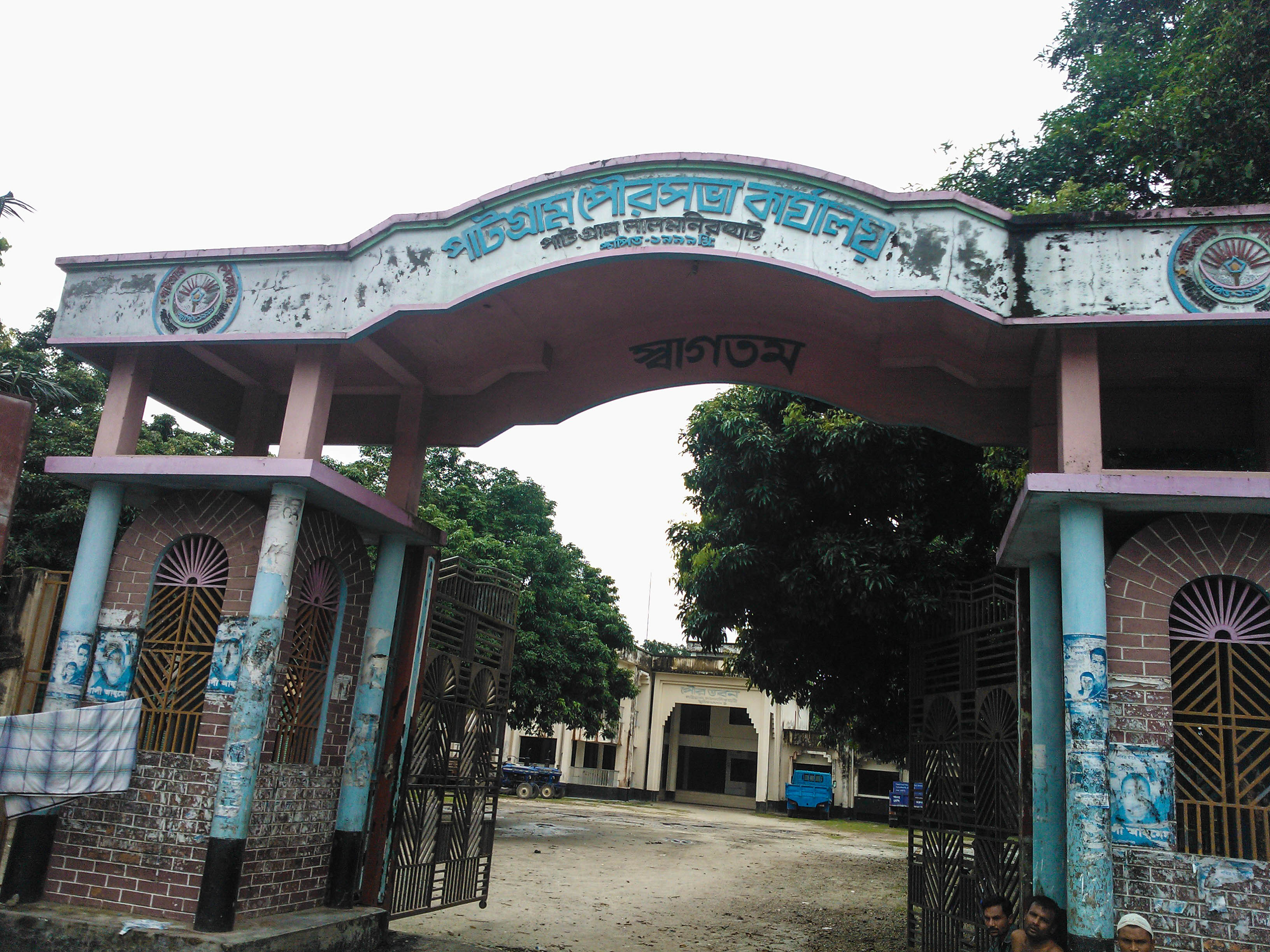
Patgram Municipality Council building

Patgram Upazila is divided into Patgram Municipality and eight union parishads: Baura, Burimari, Dahagram, Jagatber, Jongra, Kuchilbari, Patgram, and Sreerampur. The union parishads are subdivided into 45 mauzas and 46 villages.

Patgram Municipality is subdivided into 9 wards and 23 mahallas.

=== Chairmen ===
List of chairmen
Name	Term
Abdul Hakim Ahmad Rauf	5 June 1985 – 30 May 1990
Shahidullah Pradhan	1 June 1990 – 23 November 1991
Ruhul Amin Babul	15 May 2009 – 23 April 2014
Ruhul Amin Babul	24 April 2014 – 5 August 2024

== Facilities and transportation ==
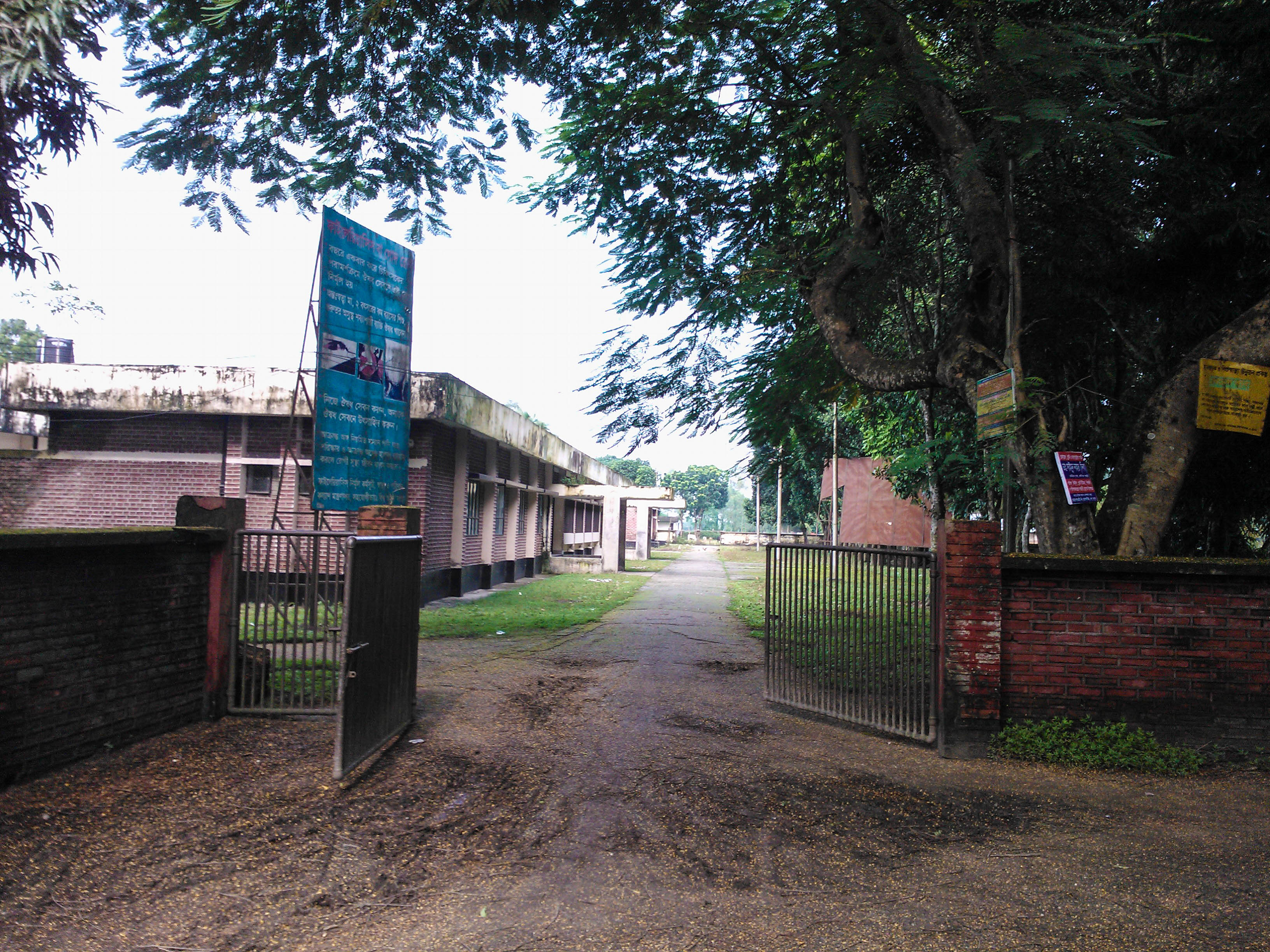
The ten-bed Dahagram Hospital

Patgram is well connected with capital city Dhaka by road, river and train via the N509, Z5903, Z5904, Burimari–Lalmonirhat–Parbatipur line and the Dharla River. The Tin Bigha Corridor also connects the community with the nearby exclave of Dahagram–Angarpota. Patgram has 352 mosques, most notably the mosques of Dhabalsati and Jamgram. The Patgram NP Senior Madrasa was established in 1962. Patgram is home to the mazar (mausoleum) of the 20th-century mystic Rasul Pir in Fakirpara.

== Notable people ==
- Kazi Nuruzzaman (1927–2017), former MP
- Abid Ali (1935–2001), politician & former MP.

== See also ==
- Upazilas of Bangladesh
- Districts of Bangladesh
- Divisions of Bangladesh
