= Tetulia Corridor =

Proposed passage

Coordinates: 26°28′37.8″N 88°30′17.4″E

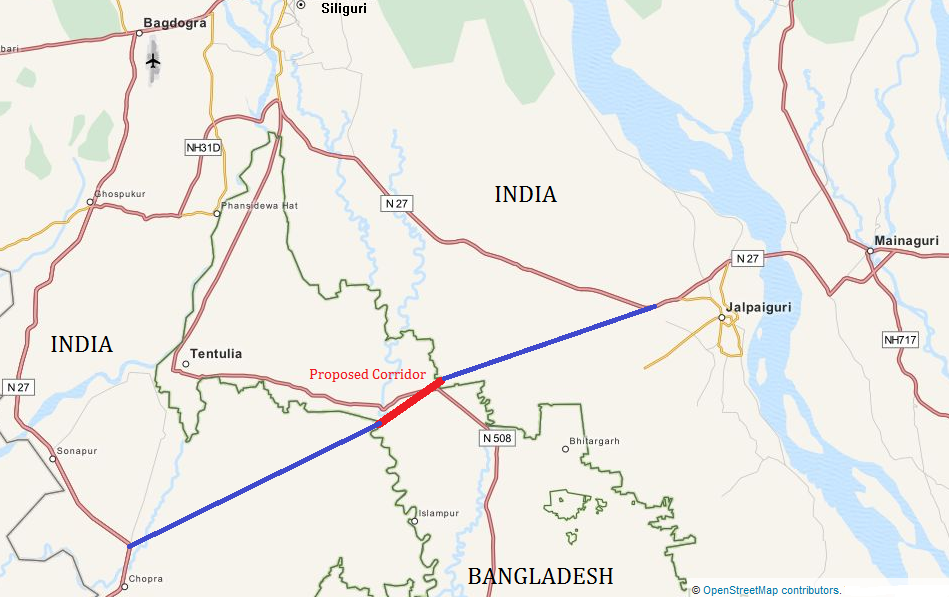
Proposed Tetulia Corridor

The Tetulia Corridor is a proposed 4 to 6 kilometres (2.5 to 3.7 mi) passage that would connect the political subdivision of Chopra in North Dinajpur district to the towns of Jalpaiguri and Mainaguri in Jalpaiguri district in the Indian state of West Bengal, through Tetulia Upazila Debangarh Union in Rangpur Division, Bangladesh. The government of India has taken up the opening of the corridor with the government of Bangladesh. The corridor would reduce the travel distance by about 84 km (52 mi) and facilitate easier access to Northeast India.

== History ==
Since the partition of India, the country's only access to its northeast has been the narrow Siliguri Corridor, vulnerable to natural disasters like landslides. Article VIII of the India-Bangladesh Trade Agreement, signed in 1980, states, "The two governments agree to make mutually beneficial arrangements for the use of their waterways, railways and roadways for commerce between the two countries and for passage of goods between two places in one country through the territory of the other". Based on this provision India allowed a Bangladesh-to-Bangladesh passage called Teen Bigha Corridor through its territory, initially for a limited duration each day, and eventually, through a lease agreement, for 24 hours a day, starting in September 2011. Afterwards, politicians in the region stepped up efforts to persuade Bangladesh to reciprocate and grant access to India through its territory.

The government of Bangladesh has not decided on the issue, and the proposal remains pending. Local leaders demanded that the Indian government initiate negotiations on the issue, and to settle it along with Indo-Bangladesh Land Boundary Agreement.

== Benefits ==
The corridor would reduce the travel distance by 84 km (52 mi) from the Indian "mainland" to the Indian northeast. It would thereby likely enhance commerce in the region, as well as facilitating Indian administration of Jalpaiguri district by making it easier to reach from the state capital.
