= Bamunigaon =

Coordinates: 26.°N 91.25°E

- Town
- Location in Assam, India Bamunigaon (India)
- Coordinates: 26.°N 91.25°E
- Country: India
- State: Assam
- Region: Western Assam
- District: Kamrup

Government
  - Body: Gram panchayat

Languages
  - Official: Assamese
- Time zone: UTC+5:30 (IST)
- PIN: 781141
- Vehicle registration: AS
- Website: kamrup.nic.in

Bamunigaon is a town in Kamrup rural district, in the state of Assam, India, situated in south bank of river Brahmaputra.

== Transport ==
The town is near National Highway 31. "Bamunigaon Railway Station" connects the town with railway network of the country. Buses and other modes of transportation are available to nearby towns and cities like Boko and Guwahati.

== See also ==
- Bamundi
- Balisatra
