= List of lighthouses in Åland =

This is a list of lighthouses in Åland.

== Lighthouses ==
Name	Image	Year built	Location & coordinates	Class of Light	Focal height	NGA number	Admiralty number	Range nml	Notes
Bärökobben Lighthouse		n/a	Offshore northeast of Bärö island 60°19′48.1″N 21°02′08.3″E	Fl WRG 3s.	7 metres (23 ft)	n/a	C4648.6	n/a	
Båden Lighthouse		n/a	Offshore 8 kilometres (5.0 mi) northwest of Fiskö island 60°28′06.8″N 21°08′55.3″E	Fl WRG 5s.	6 metres (20 ft)	n/a	C4650.5	n/a	
Bogskär Lighthouse		1882	Offshore 50 kilometres (31 mi) south southeast of Mariehamn; 59°30′16.2″N 20°20′48.1″E	Fl (3) W 20s.	28 metres (92 ft)	16092	C4486	9	original lighthouse destroyed in World War I by German battleships, was rebuilt in 1922
Bogskär Båk Lighthouse		1824	6 kilometres (3.7 mi) east of Husö island 60°04′32.6″N 20°55′30.5″E	Fl WRG 5s.	17 metres (56 ft)	n/a	C4628	n/a	
Brändö Föglö Range Rear Lighthouse		n/a	Brändö island 60°01′21.3″N 20°19′06.9″E	L Fl W 6s.	37 metres (121 ft)	n/a	C4567.11	n/a	
Brändökobben Lighthouse		n/a	West of Brändö island 60°01′28.4″N 20°18′42.1″E	Fl WRG 3s.	7 metres (23 ft)	n/a	C4567	n/a	
Fagarvik Range Rear Lighthouse		n/a	At the Lumparland ferry terminal 60°06′56.7″N 20°18′03.5″E	L Fl W 6s.	9 metres (30 ft)	n/a	C4582	n/a	
Fästorna Lighthouse		1856	Offshore c. 8 kilometres (5.0 mi) south of Föglö; 59°51′22.5″N 20°20′34.2″E	Fl WRG 5s.	19 metres (62 ft)	16158	C4546	7	
Fjärdhällan Range Front Lighthouse		n/a	Offshore c. 3 kilometres (1.9 mi) south of Mariehamn; 60°00′25.6″N 19°58′35.9″E	Q WRG	5 metres (16 ft)	n/a	C4516	n/a	
Flisörännan Lighthouse		n/a	Offshore west of Föglö island 60°00′22.3″N 20°17′57.7″E	Fl WRGY 3s.	10 metres (33 ft)	n/a	C4550	n/a	
Flisösund Lighthouse		n/a	Föglö island 60°01′00.4″N 20°19′49.5″E	Q (2) WRG 6s.	4 metres (13 ft)	n/a	C4554	n/a	
Flötjan Lighthouse		1953	Offshore 18 kilometres (11 mi) southwest of Mariehamn; 59°48′30.3″N 19°46′55.6″E	Fl (2) W 20s	26 metres (85 ft)	16100	C4482	10	
Gisslan Lighthouse		1910 est.	Offshore c. 8 kilometres (5.0 mi) southwest of Eckerö; 60°11′19.9″N 19°27′01.6″E	Fl W 5s.	16 metres (52 ft)	n/a	C4476	n/a	
Granboda Range Front Lighthouse		n/a	Degerö island 60°03′48.2″N 20°26′10.8″E	Q Y	21 metres (69 ft)	n/a	C4567.5	n/a	
Granö Lighthouse		n/a	60°03′27.4″N 19°55′30.5″E	Q (2) WRG	6 metres (20 ft)	n/a	C4510	n/a	
Gustaf Dalén Lighthouse		1947	Rödakon shoal about 8 kilometres (5.0 mi) north of Kökar; 60°05′07.2″N 20°59′00.7″E	Q (2) WRG 6s.	12 metres (39 ft)	n/a	C4629	n/a	named for Nils Gustaf Dalén, a Swedish lighthouse engineer and Nobel Laureate
Hamnö Lighthouse		n/a	Hamnö island 59°56′52.4″N 20°52′37.7″E	L Fl W 6s.	18 metres (59 ft)	n/a	C4728.1	n/a	
Kalkgrund Range Front Lighthouse		n/a	Kalkgrund island 60°03′10.2″N 20°20′05.4″E	Q WRG	11 metres (36 ft)	n/a	C4566	n/a	
Kalkgrund Range Rear Lighthouse		n/a	Skötskär, southeast of Lumparland; 60°03′38.2″N 20°20′33.1″E	L Fl W 6s.	25 metres (82 ft)	n/a	C4566.1	n/a	
Kallan Lighthouse		n/a	5 kilometres (3.1 mi) north of Lökö island 60°26′58.6″N 19°44′22.0″E	Fl WRG 3s.	8 metres (26 ft)	16808	C4465.4	4	
Kökarsören Lighthouse		1983	10 kilometres (6.2 mi) southeast of Kökar; 59°46′03.4″N 21°01′05.9″E	Fl W 5s.	24 metres (79 ft)	15804	C4726	9	
Koklubb Lighthouse		n/a	Offshore 5 kilometres (3.1 mi) southeast of Mariehamn harbour 60°00′00.8″N 20°00′03.6″E	V Q (5) 6s.	6 metres (20 ft)	n/a	C4515	n/a	
Koxnan Lighthouse		n/a	C. 15 kilometres (9.3 mi) east of Kallan Lighthouse; 60°28′02.4″N 19°56′16.6″E	Fl W 5s.	17 metres (56 ft)	16812	C4465	6	
Lågskär Lighthouse		1920	Lågskär island 59°50′28.2″N 19°54′43.9″E	Fl W 12s.	42 metres (138 ft)	16096	C4480	11	
Långören Lighthouse		n/a	8 kilometres (5.0 mi) northwest of Fiskö island 60°22′53.1″N 20°51′36.8″E	Fl WRG 3s.	10 metres (33 ft)	n/a	C4462.8	n/a	
Ledskär Lighthouse		1904 est.	Off the southeastern edge of Fasta Åland; 59°57′48.8″N 20°10′11.9″E	Q (2) WRG 5s.	9 metres (30 ft)	16144	C4542	8	
Lotsberget range Lights		n/a	Mariehamn 60°05′00.8″N 19°56′01.4″E	Iso W 2s. (front), Iso W 6s. (rear)	34 metres (112 ft)	n/a	C4500 (front), C4500.1 (rear)	n/a	
Lumparudd Lighthouse		n/a	Mariehamn; 60°10′05.3″N 20°13′48.2″E	VQ (2) WRG 6s.	6 metres (20 ft)	n/a	C4525	n/a	
Marhällan Lighthouse		1938	Offshore 6 kilometres (3.7 mi) southwest of Mariehamn; 60°01′51.3″N 19°52′18.3″E	Q (3) WRG 6s.	15 metres (49 ft)	16760	C4490	white: 10 red: 2 green: 2	
Mariehamn Lighthouse		1898	Mariehamn; 60°06′17.2″N 16°56′41.4″E	Q (2) W 6s.	8 metres (26 ft)	n/a	C4505.3	n/a	
Mellanklubb Lighthouse		n/a	Mellanklubb island 60°14′44.0″N 20°33′09.1″E	Fl WRG 3s.	6 metres (20 ft)	n/a	C4638	n/a	
Märket Lighthouse		1885	Märket; 60°18′3.63″N 19°7′53.15″E	Fl W 5s.	17 metres (56 ft)	16792	C4472	9	According to the Finnish Lighthouse Association, the lighthouse at Märket is the most unique lighthouse in all of Finland.
Nottö Lighthouse		n/a	Notö island 60°18′19.0″N 21°00′37.1″E	Fl WRG 3s.	7 metres (23 ft)	n/a	C4647	n/a	
Rannö Lighthouse		1962	Rannö island 60°31′43.6″N 20°11′55.2″E	Q (2) W 5s.	20 metres (66 ft)	16814	C4464.4	5	
Rågrund Lighthouse		n/a	Offshore southeast of Fasta Åland; 59°57′53.0″N 20°11′29.6″E	Iso WRG 2s.	10 metres (33 ft)	n/a	C4547	n/a	
Sälskär Lighthouse		1868	Sälskär island 60°24′42.2″N 19°35′33.2″E	Fl (2) W 12s.	44 metres (144 ft)	16800	C4466	12	
Sälsö Lighthouse		n/a	Sälsö island 60°04′31.2″N 20°44′57.3″E	Iso WRG 6s.	29 metres (95 ft)	n/a	C4615.1	n/a	
Sånökubb Lighthouse		n/a	Hamnö island, Sottunga municipality 60°05′55.9″N 20°40′41.0″E	Q (2) WRG 6s.	6 metres (20 ft)	n/a	C4609	n/a	
Skiftet (Kihti) Lighthouse		1938	Offshore c. 16 kilometres (9.9 mi) east of Husö island 60°04′33.7″N 21°08′15.3″E	Q (3) WRG 10s.	11 metres (36 ft)	16480	C4630	9	
Solovjeva Lighthouse		1980s	Central Åland Sea; 60°11′12.0″N 19°10′18.0″E	VQ (4) W 8s.	14 metres (46 ft)	16774	C4473.5	6	
Sottunga Rödgrund Lighthouse		n/a	Northwest off Husö island 60°05′23.6″N 20°45′34.3″E	Fl WRG 3s.	14 metres (46 ft)	n/a	C4613	n/a	
Söderkobb Lighthouse		n/a	Offshore 10 kilometres (6.2 mi) east of Kökar; 59°56′01.9″N 21°14′007.7″E	Fl W RGY 6s.	8 metres (26 ft)	n/a	C4625.5	n/a	
Stegskär Range Front Lighthouse		n/a	Offshore 10 kilometres (6.2 mi) south of Mariehamn; 60°00′46.7″N 19°57′44.5″E	Iso W 2s.	11 metres (36 ft)	n/a	C4513.4	n/a	
Stegskärsgrund Lighthouse		n/a	Offshore 5 kilometres (3.1 mi) southeast of Mariehamn; 60°00′48.3″N 19°57′41.5″E	L Fl W 5s.	24 metres (79 ft)	n/a	C4512.1	n/a	
Stora Lökskär Lighthouse		n/a	Stora Lökskär skerry, 16 kilometres (9.9 mi) southeast of Mariehamn; 59°59′01.3″N 20°01′37.8″E	n/a	6 metres (20 ft)	n/a	C4532	n/a	
Storgrund Lighthouse		1909 est.	Off the southeastern edge of Fasta Åland; 59°58′09.1″N 20°11′46.8″E	Fl WRG 5s,	9 metres (30 ft)	n/a	C4548	n/a	
Tjurgrund Lighthouse		n/a	Tjurgrund island, Sottunga municipality 60°06′33.8″N 20°41′48.2″E	Fl (2) WRG 6s.	8 metres (26 ft)	n/a	C4608	n/a	
Torsholmakobben Lighthouse		n/a	Off Torsholma, Brändö municipality 60°19′45.9″N 21°06′11.6″E	Fl WRG 3s.	8 metres (26 ft)	n/a	C4649.2	n/a	
Trännskär Lighthouse		1940	Trännskär, Sottunga municipality 60°00′57.2″N 20°47′59.7″E	Q WRG	8 metres (26 ft)	n/a	C4624	n/a	
Valberg range lights		n/a	West coast of Eckerö island 60°12′35.7″N 19°31′04.4″E	Q W (front), L Fl W 6s. (rear)	19 metres (62 ft)	n/a	C4473.3 (front), C4473.31 (rear)	n/a	

== See also ==
- List of lighthouses and lightvessels in Finland
- Lists of lighthouses and lightvessels
