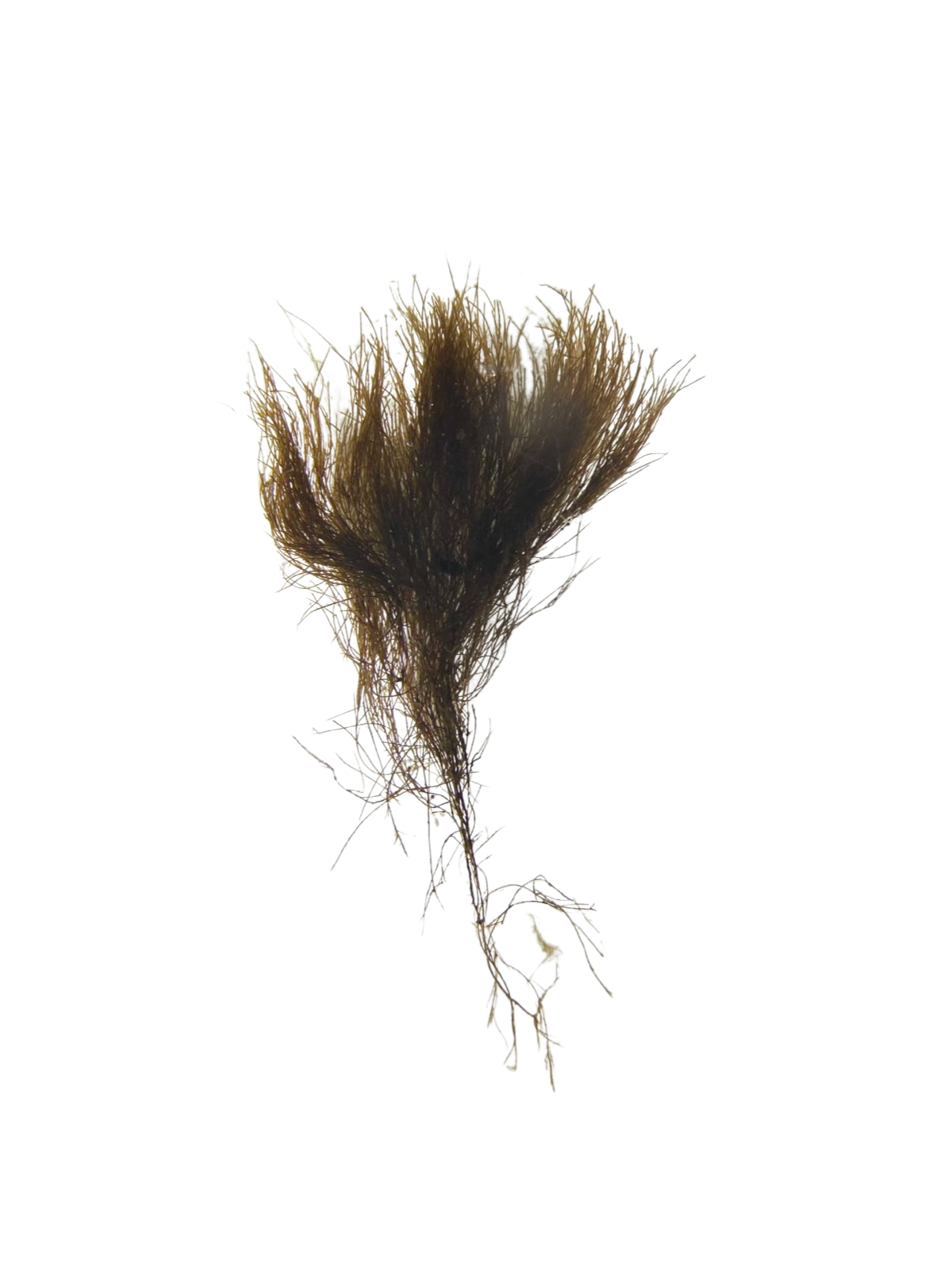

Scientific classification
- Domain: Eukaryota
- Supergroup: Stramenopiles
- Division: Ochrophyta
- Class: Phaeophyceae
- Order: Sphacelariales
- Family: Sphacelariaceae
- Genus: Battersia
- Species: B. arctica

Binomial name
- Battersia arctica (Harvey) Draisma, Prud'homme & H.Kawai, 2010

= Battersia arctica =

Species of alga

Battersia arctica is a species of algae belonging to the family Sphacelariaceae. In Iceland, it is listed as a critically endangered species (CR).

Synonym:

- Sphacelaria arctica Harvey, 1858
