= List of divided islands =

Islands divided by international borders

This is a list of islands whose territory is shared among two or more sovereign countries and delineated by one or more international borders. This list includes territorial disputes where islands are de facto divided or where at least one party's territorial claims include division of an island.

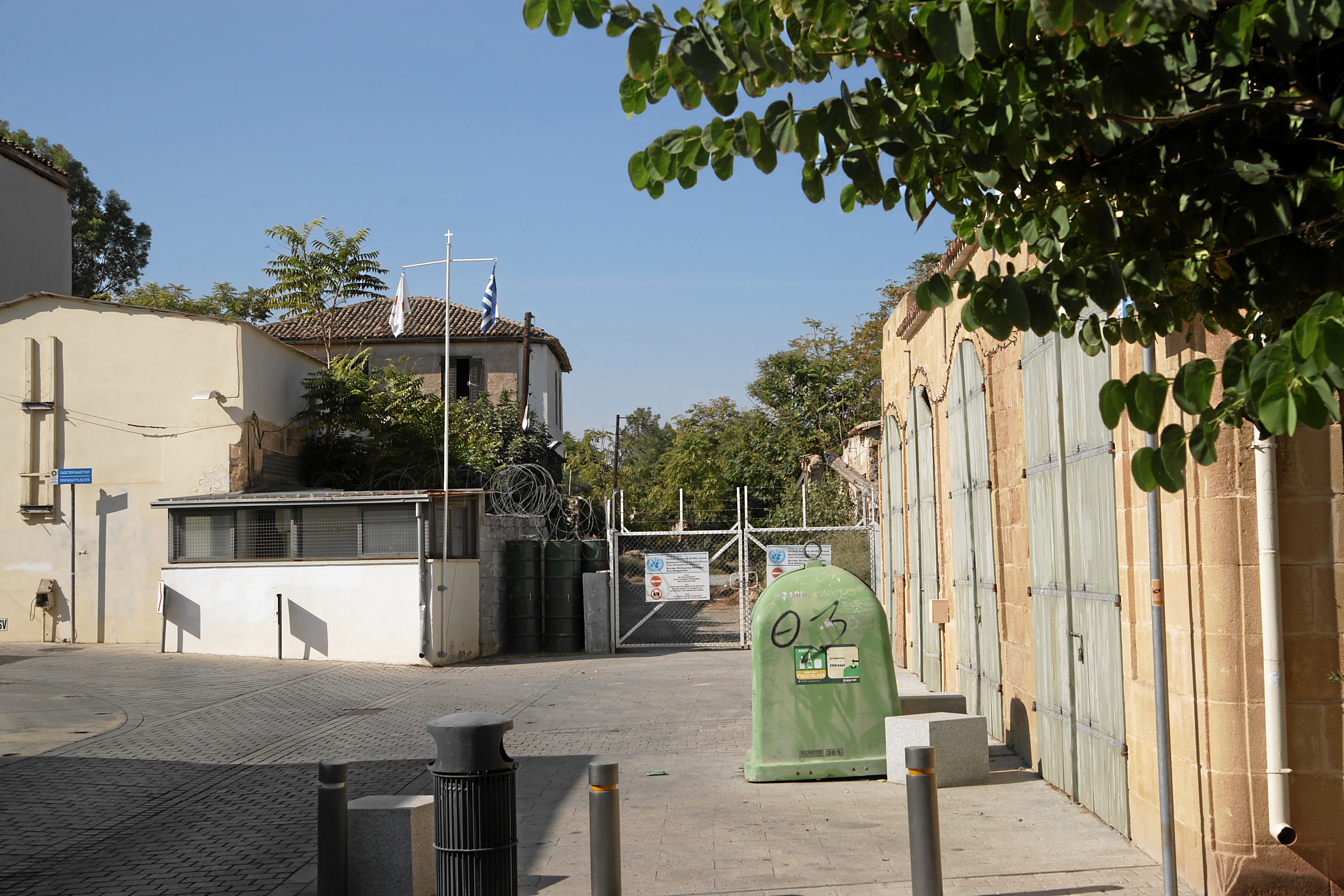
Buffer zone in Nicosia

== Sea islands ==
Island	Area		Population	Countries/Dependencies (Provinces/States/Sovereign)	Area	Population
Island	km^{2}	sq mi	Population	Countries/Dependencies (Provinces/States/Sovereign)	Area	Population
New Guinea	785,753	303,381	11,306,940	Papua New Guinea	59%	68%
New Guinea	785,753	303,381	11,306,940	Indonesia (Central Papua, Highland Papua, Papua, South Papua, and West Papua)	41%	32%
Borneo	748,168	288,869	21,258,000	Indonesia (Central, East, North, South, and West Kalimantan)	73%	70%
Borneo	748,168	288,869	21,258,000	Malaysia (Sabah and Sarawak)	26%	28%
Borneo	748,168	288,869	21,258,000	Brunei	1%	2%
Ireland	84,421	32,595	6,806,900	Ireland	83%	72%
Ireland	84,421	32,595	6,806,900	United Kingdom (Northern Ireland)	17%	28%
Hispaniola	76,192	29,418	21,396,000	Dominican Republic	64%	50%
Hispaniola	76,192	29,418	21,396,000	Haiti	36%	50%
Isla Grande de Tierra del Fuego	47,401	18,302	133,861	Chile (Antártica Chilena, Tierra del Fuego)	61%	5%
Isla Grande de Tierra del Fuego	47,401	18,302	133,861	Argentina (Tierra del Fuego)	39%	95%
Timor	28,418	10,972	3,182,693	Indonesia (East Nusa Tenggara)	51%	63%
Timor	28,418	10,972	3,182,693	East Timor	49%	37%
Cyprus	9,234	3,565	1,133,803	De jure		
Cyprus	9,234	3,565	1,133,803	Cyprus	97%	98%
Cyprus	9,234	3,565	1,133,803	Akrotiri and Dhekelia ( United Kingdom)	3%	2%
Cyprus	9,234	3,565	1,133,803	De facto		
Cyprus	9,234	3,565	1,133,803	Cyprus	58%	65%
Cyprus	9,234	3,565	1,133,803	Northern Cyprus	36%	33%
Cyprus	9,234	3,565	1,133,803	United Nations (UN Buffer Zone in Cyprus)	3%	1%
Cyprus	9,234	3,565	1,133,803	Akrotiri and Dhekelia ( United Kingdom)	3%	1%
Dall Island	655.2	253.0	20	United States (Alaska)	<100%	100%
Dall Island	655.2	253.0	20	Canada (British Columbia)	>0%	none
Sebatik Island	452.2	174.6	105,000	Indonesia (North Kalimantan)	55%	76%
Sebatik Island	452.2	174.6	105,000	Malaysia (Sabah)	45%	34%
Usedom	445	172	85,047	Germany (Mecklenburg-Vorpommern)	84%	41%
Usedom	445	172	85,047	Poland (West Pomeranian Voivodeship)	16%	59%
Saint Martin	91.9	35.5	77,741	Saint-Martin (France)	59%	44%
Saint Martin	91.9	35.5	77,741	Sint Maarten (Kingdom of the Netherlands)	41%	56%
Hans Island	1.2	0.46	0	Greenland (Kingdom of Denmark)	60%	none
Hans Island	1.2	0.46	0	Canada ( Nunavut)	40%	none
Kataja (including Inakari)	0.71	0.27	0	Sweden (Norrbotten County)	~85%	none
Kataja (including Inakari)	0.71	0.27	0	Finland (Lapland)	~15%	none
Passport Island	0.66	0.25	0	Bahrain (Northern Governorate)	~50%	none
Passport Island	0.66	0.25	0	Saudi Arabia (Eastern Province)	~50%	none
K Island	0.56	0.22	0	Ukraine (Odesa Oblast)	~60%	none
K Island	0.56	0.22	0	Romania (Tulcea County)	~40%	none
Koiluoto	0.03	0.012	0	Finland (Kymenlaakso)	~60%	none
Koiluoto	0.03	0.012	0	Russia (Leningrad Oblast)	~40%	none
Märket	0.03	0.012	0	Åland (Finland)	~55%	none
Märket	0.03	0.012	0	Sweden (Stockholm County and Uppsala County)	~45%	none
Vanhasaari/Maly Pogranichny)	0.89	0.34	0	Finland (Kymenlaakso)		none
Vanhasaari/Maly Pogranichny)	0.89	0.34	0	Russia (Leningrad Oblast)		none
Jähi	0.019686	0.007601	0	Finland (Kymenlaakso)		none
Jähi	0.019686	0.007601	0	Russia (Leningrad Oblast)		none
Island southeast of Peräluoto	0.000212	8.2×10^{−5}	0	Finland (Kymenlaakso)		none
Island southeast of Peräluoto	0.000212	8.2×10^{−5}	0	Russia (Leningrad Oblast)		none

== Lake islands ==
- Among Finland, Norway, and Sweden:
  - Three-Country Cairn, the boundary cairn at the tripoint, is 10 metres from the shore of Lake Goldajärvi/Koltajauri, and hence arguably a tiny artificial island. Around 14 m^{2}. The lower limit for artificial islands is a matter of definition, because near Haparanda there are boundary poles of less than 0.1 m^{2}.
- Between Canada and the United States:
  - A lake island at 62.649677°N 141°W, north of the Yukon–Alaska Highway border crossing
  - A lake island at 62.641158°N 141°W, north of the Yukon–Alaska Highway border crossing
  - A lake island at 62.637174°N 141°W, just north of the Yukon–Alaska Highway border crossing
  - Two islands in a small lake at 62.538443°N 141°W, 8.2 km south of the Yukon–Alaska Highway border crossing
  - Several rocky islets in a small lake on the Okanogan County, Washington/British Columbia border at 49°N 120.177376°W
  - An island in a small lake on the Okanogan County, Washington/British Columbia border at 49°N 120.172980°W
  - An island in a small lake adjacent to the Milk River at 49°N 110.546975°W in Montana/Alberta
  - An island in Salt Lake (Alkali Lake) 49°N 104.311173°W in Montana/Saskatchewan
  - An island in Brush Lake at 49°N 103.981638°W in North Dakota/Saskatchewan
  - Two islands in Boundary Lake at 49°N 100.217095°W, in North Dakota/Manitoba
  - An island in Lake Metigoshe at 49°N 100.353901°W in North Dakota/Manitoba
  - An islet east of Ross Lake at 49°N 100.298939°W in North Dakota/Manitoba
  - An island in a small lake on the Rolette County, North Dakota/Manitoba border at 49°N 100.013149°W
  - An island in a small lake on the Towner County, North Dakota/Manitoba border at 49°N 99.218163°W
  - An island in a small lake on the Cavalier County, North Dakota/Manitoba border at 49°N 98.541357°W
  - Pine and Curry Island in Lake of the Woods on the Minnesota/Ontario border at 48.876967°N 94.683964°W
  - Seaway Island in Lake St. Clair on the Michigan/Ontario border at 42.523639°N 82.677582°W
  - An island in a small lake on the border of Maine/New Brunswick at 46.005042°N 67.78108°W, southeast of Hodgdon, Maine, at the edge of the Lt. Gordon Manuel Wildlife Management Area.
  - Province Island in Lake Memphremagog, between Quebec (91%) and Vermont (9%)
- Between Norway and Russia:
  - In Klistervatn: Store Grenenholmen
  - In Grensevatn: Korkeasaari and an unnamed islet
- Between Finland and Russia:
  - Äikkäänniemi in Nuijamaanjärvi
  - Suursaari and a smaller island in Ylä-Tyrjä
  - Tarraassiinsaari, Härkäsaari, and Kiteensaari in Melaselänjärvi
  - Island in Virmajärvi
  - Rajasaari in Kokkojärvi
  - Kalmasaari in Vuokkijärvi
  - Varposaari in Hietajärvi
  - Parvajärvensaari in Parvajärvi
  - Keuhkosaari in Pukarijärvi / Ozero Pyukharin
  - Siiheojansuusaari and Tossensaari in Onkamojärvi / Ozero Onkamo
- Between Finland and Norway:
  - Island in Kivisarijärvi/Keđgisualuijävri
  - Island in lake SE of boundary marker 347A
- Between Sweden and Norway:
  - Island in Sör Vammsjön/Vammen Søndre (≈2000 m^{2})
  - Hisön/Hisøya in Norra Kornsjön/Nordre Kornsjø (≈0,09 km^{2})
  - Kulleholmen/Kalholmen (≈5500 m^{2}) and Tagholm/Tåkeholmen (≈600 m^{2}) in Södra Boksjön/Søndre Boksjø
  - Salholmen (≈4000 m^{2}), Mosvikøya (≈0.17 km^{2}) and Trollön/Trolløya (≈0.18 km^{2}) in Stora Le/Store Le
  - Tannsjöröset (≈50 m^{2}) in Tannsjøen/Tannsjön
  - Linneholmene (≈2000 m^{2}) in Helgesjøen/Helgesjön
  - Jensøya in Holmsjøen (≈0,04 km^{2})
  - Storøya in Utgardsjøen (≈0,04 km^{2})
  - Fallsjøholmen in Fallsjøen (Nordre Røgden) (≈4000 m^{2})
  - Island in Kroksjøen
  - Island in Vonsjøen (≈9000 m^{2})
  - Island in Skurdalssjøen/Kruehkiejaevrie
  - Island in a lake at altitude 710m on the Gihcijoka/Gihtsejåhkå river
  - Three islands in Čoarvejávri
- Between Belarus and Latvia:
  - Unnamed island in Lake Rychy
- Between Lithuania and Belarus:
  - Sosnovec and another nameless island in Lake Drūkšiai
- Between the United Kingdom and Ireland:
  - Pollatawny in Lough Vearty.
- Between Argentina and Chile:
  - Isla Dos Hitos in Lago General Carrera/Lago Buenos Aires
- Between Ethiopia and Djibouti:
  - Island off Cape Aleilou in Lake Abbe
- The border between Austria and Hungary cuts across the Neusiedler See/Fertő tó, where the water level fluctuates, sometimes exposing island flats which straddle the border.

== River islands ==
- Island (Staustufe Apach) in the Moselle River near Schengen: mostly in France, the tip is in the Moselle condominium shared by Luxembourg and Germany
- Bolshoy Ussuriyskiy (Heixiazi) at the confluence of the Ussuri and Amur rivers, between China and Russia.
- Bolshoy (Abagaitu) at the Argun River, between China and Russia.
- An island in the Šešupė River divided between Lithuania and the Kaliningrad Oblast of Russia
- Corocoro Island in the delta of the Barima River: split between Venezuela and Guyana
- San Jose Island, Río Negro: between Colombia and Brazil.
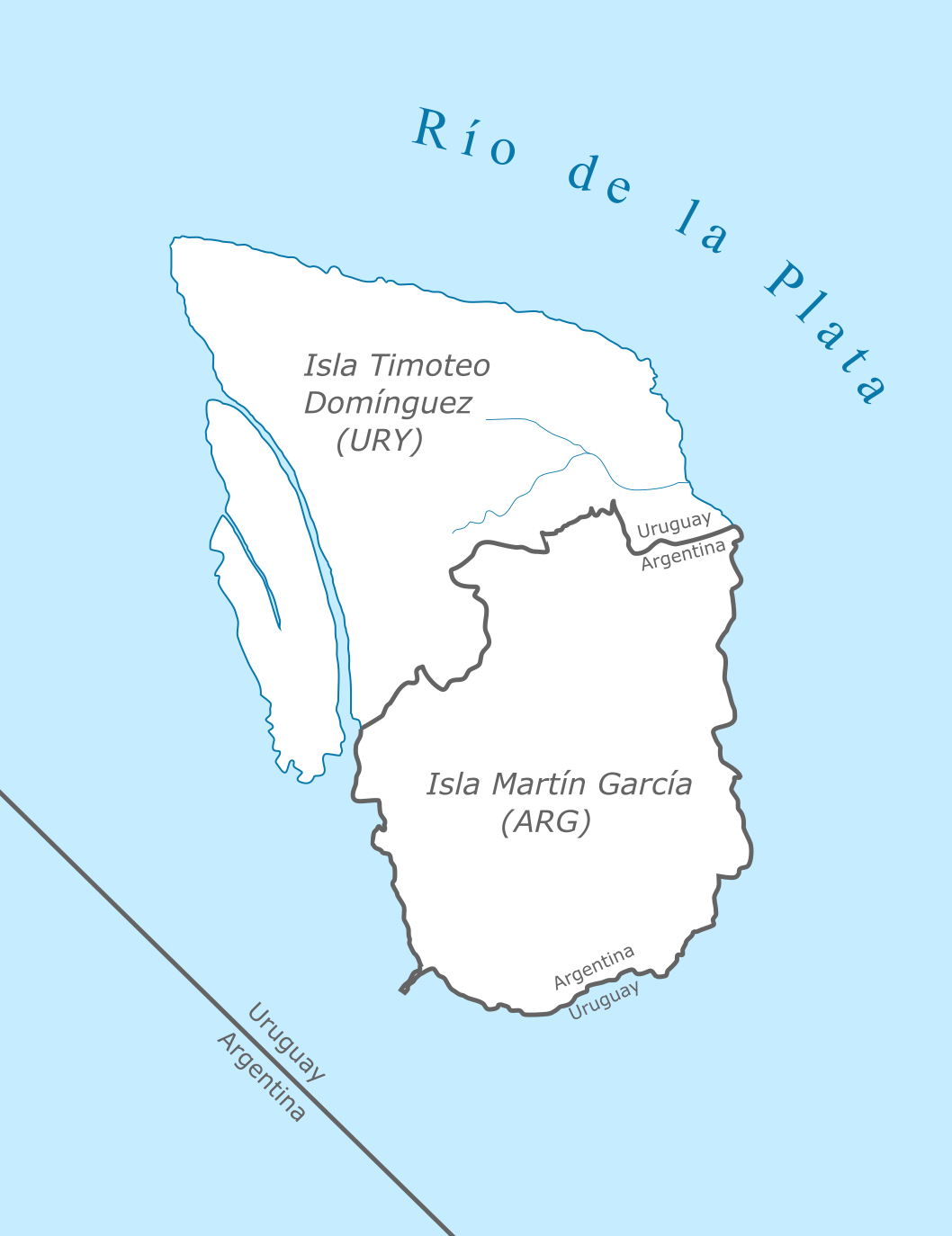
- The island complex Martín García–Timoteo Domínguez is the only land border between Argentina and Uruguay.
  The island complex Martín García–Timoteo Domínguez in the Río de la Plata between Argentina and Uruguay.
- Turunchuk (Turunciuc) Island formed by Dniester River and its anabranch Turunchuk on Ukraine-Moldovan border.
- The lower reaches of the Ganges, Teesta, and Brahmaputra Rivers, approaching the Ganges Delta, are braided and contain numerous sand islands called chars. These can be large and inhabited but are impermanent. At any given time, several are likely to straddle the border between India (Assam and West Bengal) and Bangladesh, though this border is not fully specified.
- An island labelled 'Q' in the Maritsa River, between Greece and Turkey.
- An islet in the Uutuanjoki, between Finland and Norway, at 69.579665°N 29.231701°E.
- An islet in the Vadet near Tunnsjø, between Norway and Sweden, at 64.644443°N 13.71056°E.
- An islet on the western side of the golf course that straddles the municipalities of Tornio in Finland, and Haparanda in Sweden, at 65.861513°N 24.129624°E.
- An islet in the Euphrates River on the border of Iraq and Syria.
- Nokiel and another unnamed islet in the Dunajec river, between Slovakia and Poland, at 49.3984°N 20.359726°E.
- Nicaragua and Honduras share four islands along a straight-line border in the delta of the Río Negro at the Gulf of Fonseca.
- Argentina and Chile share an island formed by branches of the Río Mayer.
- Bolivia and Chile share an island formed by the Putani River and its branch, Quebrado Coipacoipani.
- Canada/United States:
  - 9 islands serially located in the Clarence River on the Alaska North Slope near Demarcation Bay; northernmost at 69.616789°N 141°W, southernmost at 69.557094°N 141°W
  - One or more islands in Trail Creek at 68.881754°N 141°W, northeast of Arctic Village, Alaska
  - An island in Mancha Creek at 68.663957°N 141°W, northeast of Arctic Village, Alaska
  - 6 (or more) islands in bifurcated flow in the Firth River at 68.641781°N 141°W, northeast of Arctic Village, Alaska
  - An island in Sunaghun Creek at 67.426117°N 141°W, near its mouth at the Porcupine River, downstream of Old Crow, Yukon
  - An island in the watershed of the Bluefish River at 66.838155°N 141°W, east of Chalkyitsik, Alaska and 15 km WWSW of Bluefish Lake, Yukon
  - An island in Fort Creek at 66.759004°N 141°W, east of Chalkyitsik, Alaska
  - An island in the Black River (Salmon Fork) at 66.543661°N 141°W, east of Chalkyitsik, Alaska
  - An island in Beaver Creek at 62.227460°N 141°W, southwest of Beaver Creek, Yukon
  - Two islands in Klehini River at 59.448142°N 136.365213°W, near Klukwan, Alaska
  - 11 (or more) islands in bifurcated river flow on Whiting River at 58.184862°N 133.221034°W, upstream of Gilbert Bay, which empties into Stephens Passage
  - Two islands in Stikine River at 56.658546°N 131.848698°W, downstream of Great Glacier, Yukon
  - An island in Columbia River at Waneta border crossing at 49.000766°N 117.6335648°W in Washington/British Columbia
  - An island in Belly River at 49°N 113.683294°W in Montana/Alberta
  - An island in a branch of Lee Creek at 49°N 113.600862°W in Montana/Alberta
  - An islet in Boundary Creek at 49°N 113.357300°W in Montana/Alberta
  - An island in St. Mary River 49°N 113.326222°W in Montana/Alberta
  - An islet in Milk River at 48.998739°N 112.555541°W in Montana/Alberta
  - An island in Mundell Creek at 49°N 109.089222°W in Montana/Saskatchewan
  - An island in McEachern Creek at 49°N 106.938504°W in Montana/Saskatchewan
  - An island in the Pembina River at 49.000288°N 98.206118°W in North Dakota/Manitoba
  - Crystal Island in the Detroit River between Michigan and Ontario at 42°07′21″N 83°07′17″W, east of Grosse Ile, Michigan.
  - An island in tributary of Northwest Branch Saint John River at 46.690407°N 69.998277°W in Maine/Quebec near Lac-Frontière.
  - An island on the Maine/New Brunswick border (46.277407°N 67.78215°W) in the North Branch–Meduxnekeag River.
  - An island on the Maine/New Brunswick border southeast of Monticello, Maine (46.272890°N 67.7821°W, formed by streams that flow into the North Branch–Meduxnekeag River.

== Historically divided islands ==
Other islands have been divided by international borders in the past but they are now unified.

The definite borders of modern nation states do not apply in other forms of societal organisation, where "divided" islands may consequently be less noteworthy. For example, in Ancient Greece, the island of Euboea was divided among several city-states, including Chalcis and Eretria; and before its settlement by Europeans, the island of Tasmania was divided among nine indigenous tribes. Almost every major island in Maritime Southeast Asia (such as Sumatra, Java, Borneo, and Sulawesi) was historically divided into multiple monarchies and other societies.

Islands in wartime may be divided between an invading and defending power, as with Crete in 1645–1669 between the Ottoman Empire and the Republic of Venice.

Examples of formerly divided islands include:

- Boundary Islet – divided between the colonies of Victoria (part of New South Wales until 1851) and Tasmania (known as Van Diemen's Land until 1856); remained separated between two Australian states
- Corsica – was divided between the Republic of Pisa and the Republic of Genoa by a ruling by Pope Innocent II in 1132, and it remained so until the Battle of Meloria of 1284. Subsequently Corsica became part of Genoa, the Crown of Aragon, Genoa again, the Corsican Republic, France, Anglo-Corsican Kingdom, and finally France again.
- Sardinia – was divided into indigenous giudicati since before the year 900 through the extinction of the Giudicato of Arborea in 1420. Since then, Sardinia has successively been a part of the Crown of Aragon, the Spanish Empire, Piedmont–Sardinia, the Kingdom of Italy, and the Republic of Italy.
- Saaremaa (1237–1570) and Hiiumaa (1254–1563) – Divided between the Livonian Order and the Bishopric of Ösel-Wiek (the Kingdom of Denmark after 1560). Thereafter these were part of Denmark (Saaremaa only), the Kingdom of Sweden, Imperial Russia, Estonia, the Soviet Union, Nazi Germany (1941–1944), the Soviet Union again, and finally Estonia after the dissolution of the Soviet Union in 1991.
- Piirissaar in Lake Peipus – literally "Border Island" in Estonian, it was first divided in the 13th or 14th century and remained divided between the Bishopric of Dorpat and the later Polish Livonia and Swedish Livonia on one side and the Novgorod Republic and the later Principality of Pskov, Pskov Republic and the Tsardom of Russia on the other side until the annexation of Swedish Livonia into Russia in 1721.
- Saint Croix – Dutch, English and French colonists in different settlements from the early 17th century until 1645.
- Tobago – from 1654 through 1659, this island had colonies from both the Duchy of Courland and Semigallia and the Dutch Republic. Both of these colonies failed economically and were abandoned. Later, Tobago became part of the French Empire, then the Kingdom of Great Britain (1706), the United Kingdom of Great Britain and Ireland, the present United Kingdom, and the independent country of Trinidad and Tobago.
- Ternate – divided between the Spanish Empire allied with Tidore, and the Dutch Republic allied with the Sultan of Ternate from 1607 through 1663. Later, Ternate has successive been owned by the Netherlands, the Empire of Japan (1942–1945), Netherlands again, and the independent country of Indonesia, beginning in 1949.
- Long Island, New York – divided between the Dutch Republic and the Kingdom of England beginning in 1640 (de facto, by the founding of the Southold), or in 1650 (de jure, by the Treaty of Hartford), through to the surrender of New Netherland to the British Army in 1664. Thereafter, Long Island has been owned by Kingdom of England, the Kingdom of Great Britain, and the United States from 1781 through the present. Long Island has been part of the State of New York since 1781, and it is the largest island in the contiguous United States (48 states).
- Great Britain – Earlier divided into three or more kingdoms, including England, Wales, and Scotland, and sometimes ruled in part by the Roman Empire and the Danish Empire. These parts were reduced to just two before 1707, when the Kingdom of England and the Kingdom of Scotland enacted the Acts of Union of 1707, establishing just one monarchy and one parliament. Since 1707, England, Scotland, and Wales have been part of (successively) the Kingdom of Great Britain, the United Kingdom of Great Britain and Ireland, and the United Kingdom of Great Britain and Northern Ireland, often called the United Kingdom for short.
- Sri Lanka – In the 1000s, the island was ruled in part by the Chola Empire, the Tamil Kingdoms in the North, and the Sinhalese Kingdoms in the south. The island was later divided into three or more kingdoms, including the Jaffna Kingdom, the Vanni Nadu, the Kingdom of Kandy, and the Kingdom of Kotte. After waves of Portuguese, Dutch and British colonization, the island was united as a single entity under the British. The country then known as Ceylon attained independence in 1948, and in 1972, the current Democratic Socialist Republic of Sri Lanka was established.
- Newfoundland Island – Earlier divided between Great Britain and the French Empire until the enactment of the Treaty of Utrecht in 1713. Following this treaty, Newfoundland was part of the British Empire. Then it became the partially independent Dominion of Newfoundland, which next became a Province of Canada in 1949.
- Saint Kitts – Divided between Great Britain and the French Empire in 1628. "The island fell to the French in April 1666, but by the Treaty of Utrecht, April 11, 1713, it was yielded entirely to the British crown." Then it became part of the British Empire for about 250 years, and finally part of the independent country of Saint Kitts and Nevis. At various times of war in the Caribbean Sea, either France or Great Britain occupied all of Saint Kitts both before and after 1713.
- Elba – divided from 1548 through 1802. Portoferraio belonged to the Duke of Florence (later the Grand Duchy of Tuscany) from 1548 until this was ceded to France in 1802 under the Treaty of Amiens. Porto Longone belonged to the State of Presidi, a client of first the Spanish Empire and then the Kingdom of Naples, from 1557 until ceded to France in 1801 by the Treaty of Florence. The rest of this island belonged to the Principality of Piombino until conquered by the French Empire, and then in 1802 Napoleon made Elba part of the Kingdom of Etruria. This island was successively part of the French Empire, the Principality of Piombino under Elisa Baciocchi, under the sovereignty of Napoleon by the terms of the Treaty of Fontainebleau (1814), part of Tuscany again, part of the Kingdom of Italy, Italian Social Republic (1943–44), and finally a part of the Republic of Italy.
- Efate – Divided for several months during 1889 between Franceville and the New Hebrides, then under an Anglo-French joint naval commission.
- Sakhalin Island – Divided between the Russian Empire, then the Soviet Union, and the Empire of Japan along the 50th parallel north by the terms of the Treaty of Portsmouth of 1905 through the final Surrender of the Empire of Japan in 1945. Henceforth, all of Sakhalin became part of the Soviet Union, and then the Russian Federation, de facto. Japan still considers the ownership of Sakhalin to be undetermined, and Sakhalin is shown on many Japanese maps as a "no man's land".
- Killiniq Island – divided between Canada and the Colony of Newfoundland and then the Dominion of Newfoundland beginning with the cession of the Rupert's Land to the Dominion of Canada in 1870 as the North-West Territories and the province of Manitoba through 1949 with the confederation of Newfoundland as a Canadian province.
- Ankoko Island in the Cuyuni River on the border between Venezuela and British Guiana (now Guyana).
- Zhongshan Island in the Pearl River Delta was divided between the People's Republic of China and Portuguese Macau before the handover of Macao to China in 1999.
- Frijoles Island within Gatun Lake in the former Panama Canal Zone was split between the United States and Panama on 1 October 1979, the date that the 1977 Panama Canal Treaty took effect. Much of the former Canal Zone area was transferred to Panama on that day. The Panama Railroad served as the new border in an area where it crosses Gatun Lake via a causeway, with the railroad bisecting Frijoles Island. The entire island transferred to exclusive Panamanian jurisdiction on 31 December 1999.
- The small middle island of Las Tres Hermanas ("The Three Sisters") off the Pacific coast of Panama City was split between the U.S. Panama Canal Zone and Panama by the Taft Agreement on 12 December 1904. The entire island was placed in the Canal Zone on 11 February 1915. Today the Cinta Costera lies on top of it.
- Popes Folly Island in Passamaquoddy Bay between the United States (Maine) and Canada (New Brunswick) had been divided prior to the 1908 border treaty between the U.S. and Great Britain.
- Taiwan, historically known as Formosa and Tywan, was in the 17th century colonised by the Dutch and the Spaniards, along with the indigenous Kingdom of Middag.

A few former islands have disappeared because of changes in water levels:

- Vozrozhdeniya Island in the Aral Sea was split between the Soviet Republics of Uzbekistan and Kazakhstan. This border became an international one in 1991 when the Soviet Union was dissolved. By the year 2002, this island had become a peninsula of the mainland because of the falling water level of the Aral Sea.
- The small Bogomerom Archipelago of islets in Lake Chad was formerly divided between Chad and Nigeria. The water level of Lake Chad has historically varied a lot, but this level has fallen so low that these islets are now part of the mainland of Africa.

== Subnationally divided islands ==
There are islands that lie across different provinces or states of the same country.

Killiniq Island of Canada, which is divided between Newfoundland and Labrador and Nunavut, whereas Melville Island and Victoria Island are divided between Nunavut and the Northwest Territories. In Australia, the Boundary Islet is divided between Tasmania and Victoria.

Smith Island in Chesapeake Bay and Assateague Island, a barrier island on the Atlantic coast of the United States, are divided between the states of Maryland and Virginia. Ellis Island contains a true exclave of the state of New York, which is largely the area of the original natural island, while all land reclamation extensions from 1890-1935 are in New Jersey. The states also share Shooters Island in Newark Bay. Owing only to accretion of silt, an island has arisen spontaneously in the Mississippi River at the location of the boundary trijunction of Arkansas, Louisiana, and Mississippi, and is thus divided among the three states.

Pag, in Croatia, is divided between Zadar County and Lika-Senj County.

Ishima, in Japan, is divided between Kagawa Prefecture in the South and Okayama Prefecture in the north. Chek Lap Kok in Hong Kong is divided between Islands and Tuen Mun districts, and Lantau is divided between Islands and Tsuen Wan districts.

Chongming Island, while most commonly known as the main part of Chongming District of Shanghai, has a long and narrow part on the northwest of the island which is administrated by Nantong, Jiangsu.

== See also ==
- List of enclaves and exclaves – a subcategory of pene-enclaves/exclaves
- Condominium (international law) – land jointly administered by two states, rather than divided between them (e. g., Pheasant Island, administered by France and Spain during alternating periods of six months).
- Category:Disputed islands and list of territorial disputes – includes many islands claimed by multiple countries, but administered by one.
- Guantanamo Bay Naval Base – leased indefinitely by the United States but with sovereignty retained by Cuba
- Korean Demilitarized Zone – includes several small islands
- Lake island
