= Märket =

Uninhabited skerry between Sweden and Finland

- Märket Island with its inverted 'S' international border of 1985.
- Interactive map of Märket

Geography
- Location: Baltic Sea
- Coordinates: 60°18′03″N 019°07′53″E
- Area: 0.03 km^{2} (0.012 sq mi)
- Length: 0.35 km (0.217 mi)
- Width: 0.15 km (0.093 mi)

Administration
- Finland
- Region: Åland
- Sweden
- Counties: Uppsala län
- Stockholms län

Demographics
- Population: 0

Additional information
- Time zone: EET and CET
- Märket lighthouse Märket
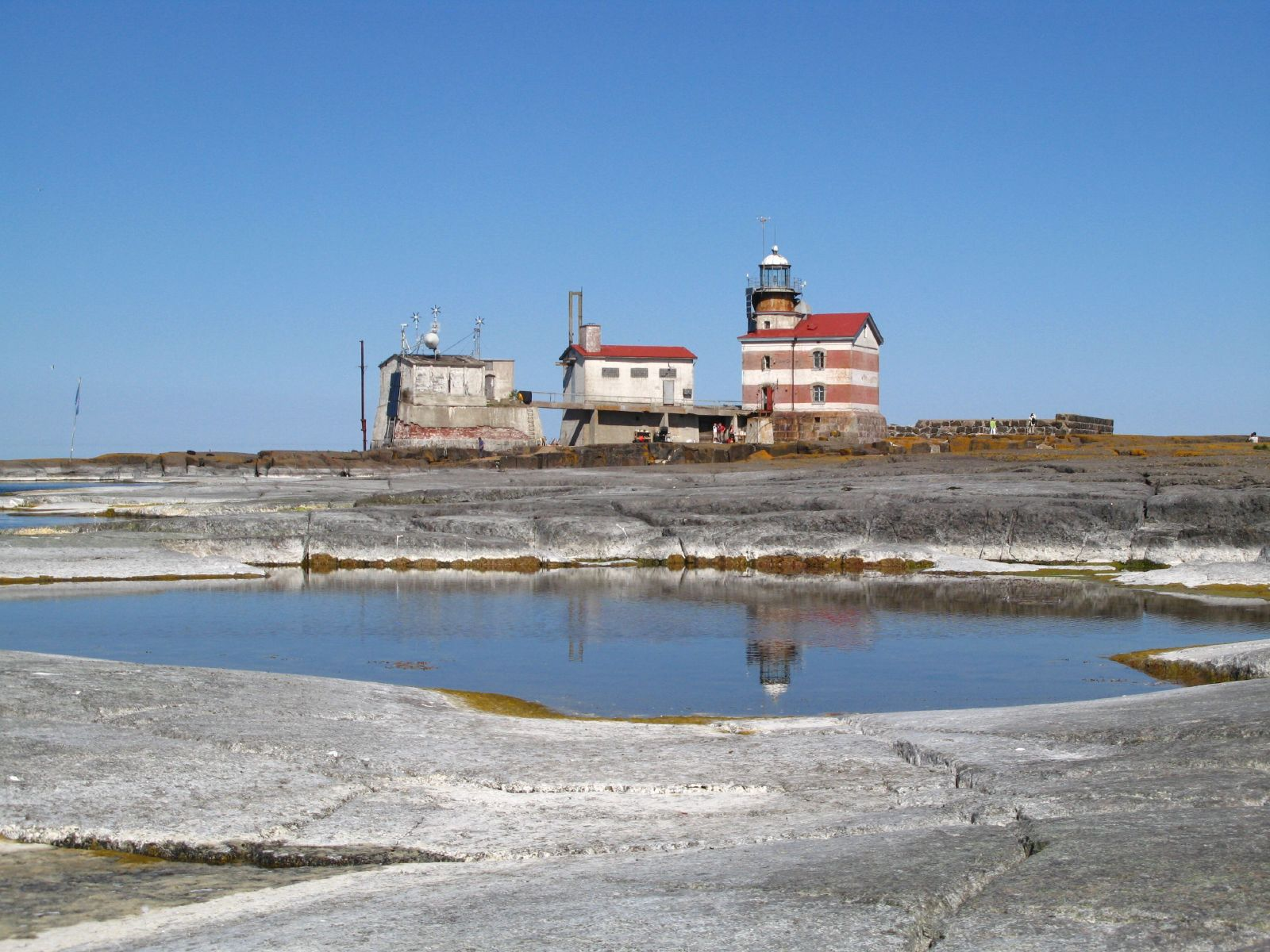
- Coordinates: 60.301008°N 19.131432°E
- Constructed: 1885
- Construction: stone and cast iron tower
- Automated: 1979
- Height: 14 metres (46 ft)
- Shape: cylindrical tower on an octagonal basement rising from a 2-story keeper’s house
- Markings: white tower and lantern
- Power source: solar panel, acetylene, diesel generator, kerosene
- First lit: 10 November 1885
- Focal height: 17 metres (56 ft)
- Range: 8.5 nmi (15.7 km; 9.8 mi)
- Characteristic: Fl W 5s.

Märket ('The Mark', Swedish pronunciation: [ˈmæ̂rːkɛt]) is a 3.3-hectare (8.2-acre) uninhabited skerry in the Baltic Sea shared by Sweden and Finland (in the area of the autonomous region Åland), with a lighthouse as its salient humanmade feature. Märket has been divided between the two countries since the Treaty of Fredrikshamn of 1809 defined the border between Sweden and Grand Duchy of Finland as going through the middle of the island. The Finnish side of the island is part of the Municipality of Hammarland in the autonomous region of Åland and is the westernmost land point of Finland. The Swedish part of the island is itself divided between two counties of Sweden: Uppsala County (Östhammar Municipality) and Stockholm County (Norrtälje Municipality).

== Geography and history ==
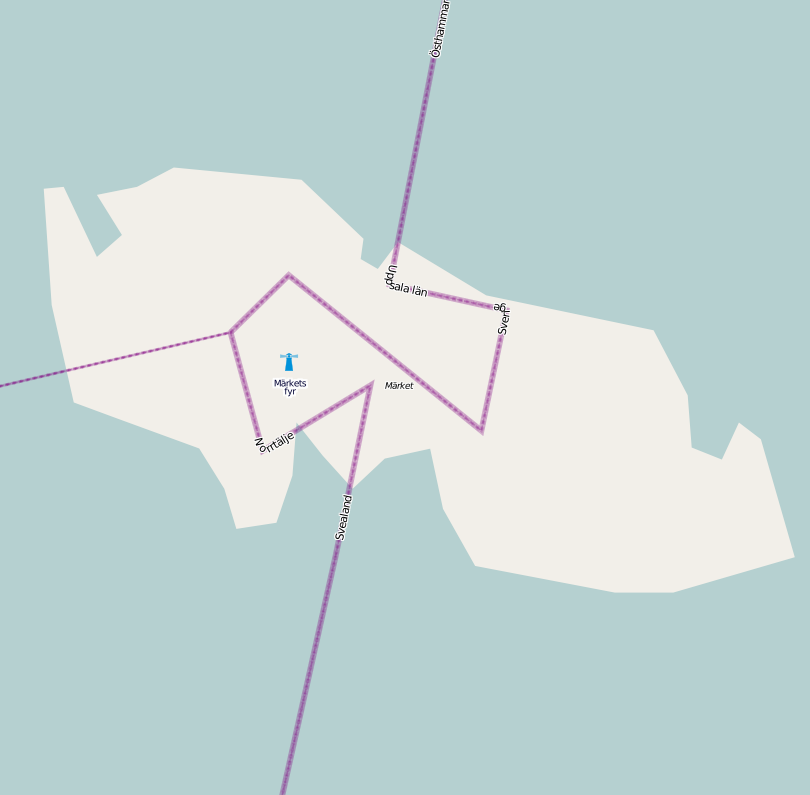
Märket Island with the international border and the county border on the Swedish part

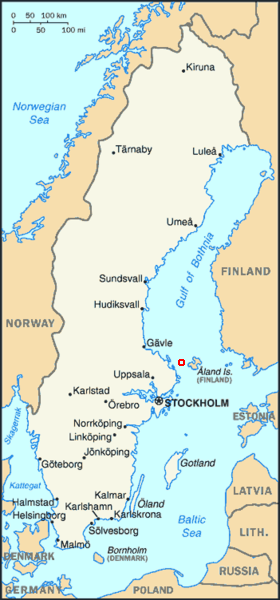
Location of Märket Island

The 6-nautical-mile-wide (11 km; 6.9 mi) Understen–Märket Passage links the Bothnian Sea to the Baltic proper. The skerry is roughly 350 metres (1,150 ft) long by 150 metres (490 ft) wide, and has an area of about 3.3 hectares (8.2 acres). The island is gaining height due to post-glacial rebound, and was probably underwater before the 1500s.

Märket is the smallest sea island shared by two countries. The border used to be straight until the Grand Duchy of Finland built the lighthouse on the Swedish side, so that the border had to be changed. The name Märket ('the Mark') probably comes from its usefulness as a navigation mark before there were lighthouses. The route between Sweden and Åland has a passage about 15 nautical miles (28 km; 17 mi) long over open sea. Before the lighthouse was erected, the island and its shallows were dangerous navigational hazards, which seafarers tried desperately to avoid. In 1873, as many as 23 ships were grounded on the Swedish coast and its archipelago trying to avoid Märket, and eight of them were shipwrecked. Märket is detached from the main Åland archipelago, with the closest island more than 10 km (6.2 mi) away, and the closest harbor, Berghamn, 23 km (14 mi) away in Eckerö. There is no deep harbor; the island can only be reached with boats. There are small, barely surfacing rocks northwest of Märket, called Märketshällor ("stones of Märket"), which are too small to sustain vegetation.

The island consists of mostly smooth diabase rock, with a maximum natural elevation of 2 m (6.6 ft). Most of the area is regularly washed over with seawater in storms, and scoured by drift ice in winter. Plant life, which is limited to low-growing grasses and herbs, persists only in some protected spots. Twenty-three plant species have been identified altogether. The halophilic grass Puccinellia capillaris and the herbaceous Sagina nodosa (knotted pearlwort) are found scattered throughout the island. Among rarer species, Spergularia marina (salt sandspurry) grows on Märket. Salix caprea (goat willow) grows on an abandoned building.

There are large grey seal communities around Märket, and the island has been a target for seal safaris.

== International border and lighthouse ==
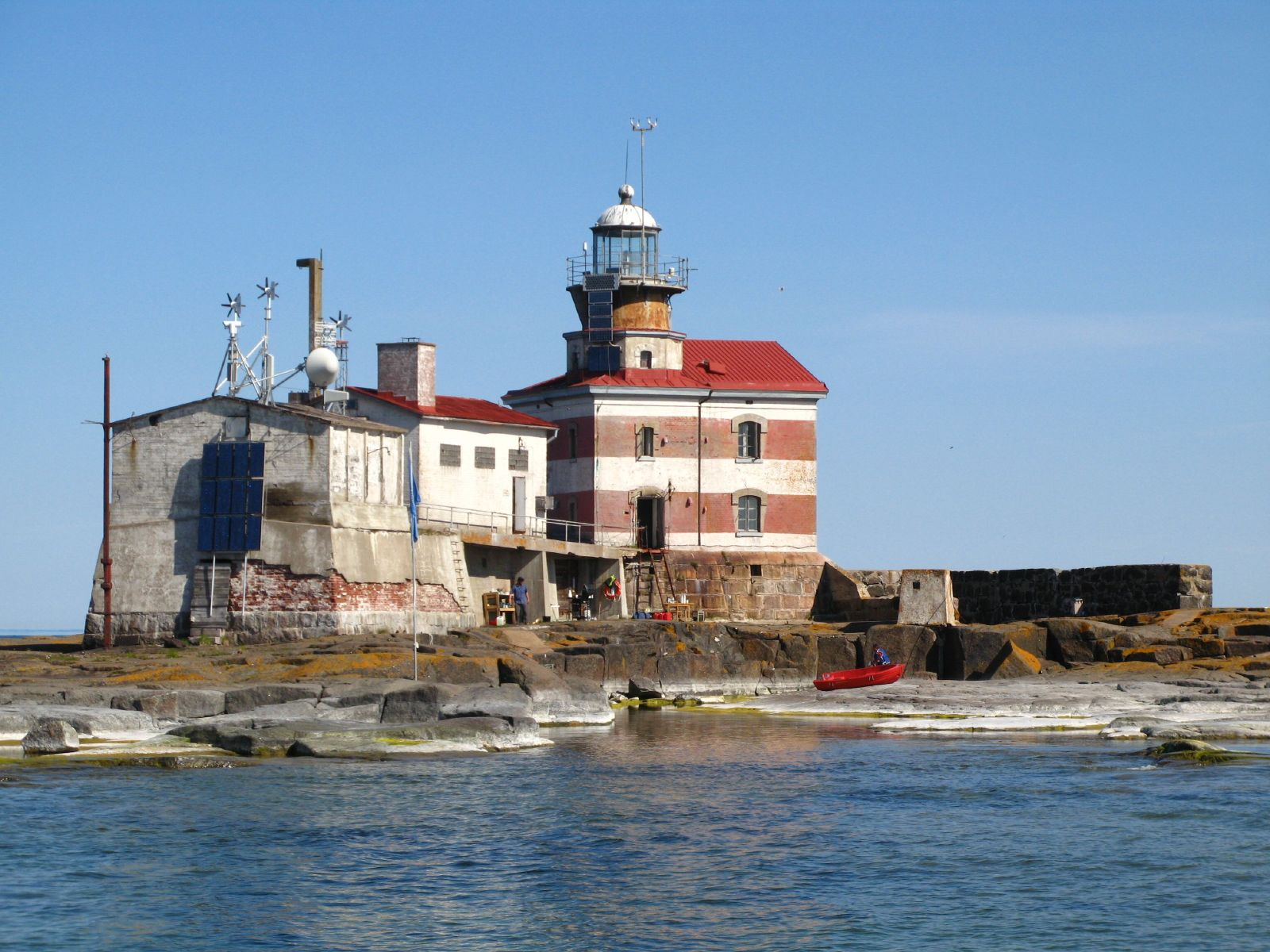
The island lighthouse

There is a lighthouse on the Finnish side of the current border. When it was built by the Grand Duchy of Finland in 1885, the island was considered a no-man's land, so the lighthouse was simply built upon the highest point of the island. However, the location selected was within the Swedish portion of the island. Though the lighthouse was formerly on the Swedish side of the border, it was never considered Swedish, nor administered from Sweden.

As a result, the border was adjusted in 1985 so that the lighthouse is now located on Finnish territory. The adjustment was carried out such that no net transfer of territory occurred, and the ownership of the coastline was unchanged so as not to interfere with each country's fishing rights.

This resulted in an unusual shape for the international border to satisfy both Finnish and Swedish interests. The adjusted border takes the form of an inverted 'S', and the lighthouse is connected to the rest of Finland only by a short stretch of land. The border on the island is around 480 metres (1,570 ft) long. The border is regularly resurveyed every 25 years by officials representing both countries. The last such joint inspection took place in August 2006. The border is marked by holes drilled into the rock, because the seasonal drift ice would shear off any protruding markers. Because of the Nordic Passport Union and the Schengen Agreement, there have been no passport checks or other border formalities at the border since 1958, so intra-Nordic/intra-Schengen visitors may visit the island freely.

The lighthouse has been automated since 1979 and the surrounding buildings are no longer used. The increasing general availability of GPS has made the lighthouse's primary function redundant.

== Radio amateurs activity ==
Radio amateurs around the world consider the Finnish part of Märket (Märket Reef or Market Reef as they call it) a separate entity, distinct from Finland, the Åland Islands and Sweden. The Finnish part of Märket Reef used to be one of the world's most desired "countries" to contact among radio amateurs because of its special status and relative remoteness. One or more amateur radio expeditions to the island occur most years, weather permitting. During these expeditions, tens of thousands of radio contacts are made with people in several parts of the world. At high seas, landing is only possible with a helicopter. Pictures of Märket are shown on QSL cards. The official prefix for use on the Finnish side is OJ0 call sign prefix for Märket Reef. An OJ0 vanity callsign can be obtained, for a fee, from Traficom.fi, the Finnish Transport and Communication Agency. Amateurs with licenses in countries supporting CEPT can operate from the reef while using the OJ0/ prefix in front of one's own call sign. All radio activity on the island is by visitors on DX-peditions. When the Finnish part of the reef was given its special status in amateur radio, in the late 1960s the lighthouse keeper himself became a licensed amateur radio operator, who initially used the call OH0MA. On the Swedish side of Märket Reef, the call signs 8S9M and SI8MI have been used.

== Climate ==
Märket has a continental climate affected by oceanic influences; it has a reputation for being one of the windiest places in Finland. A meteorological station has been managed by the lighthouse keepers since 1896, and an automatic station of the Finnish Meteorological Institute was inaugurated on 10 November 1977, shortly before its automation.

The effect of the sea is very important to the climate of the island; thermal inertia dramatically reduces the temperature fluctuations during the year compared to those of the continent, and to a lesser extent, those of the central part of Fasta Åland, the largest island of the archipelago of Åland. Märket holds five records for daytime temperatures among Finnish weather stations, all in the period between 29 November and 1 January, with 10.2 °C (50.4 °F) on 15 December 2006, and 8.8 °C (47.8 °F) on 31 December 1975. The average yearly temperature is roughly 6 °C (43 °F) and is one of the highest in Finland, with the month of January being milder than on the continent (−2.5 °C or 27.5 °F on average), and a warm summer (15.9 °C or 60.6 °F on average in July). The island is drier than the mainland; the average annual rainfall does not usually surpass 550 millimetres (22 in).

Climate data for Hammarland Märket (1991–2020 normals, extremes 1995- present)
Month	Jan	Feb	Mar	Apr	May	Jun	Jul	Aug	Sep	Oct	Nov	Dec	Year
Record high °C (°F)	9.3 (48.7)	9.0 (48.2)	12.8 (55.0)	15.5 (59.9)	23.3 (73.9)	24.8 (76.6)	27.8 (82.0)	26.0 (78.8)	23.1 (73.6)	18.2 (64.8)	13.6 (56.5)	10.3 (50.5)	27.3 (81.1)
Daily mean °C (°F)	−0.1 (31.8)	−1.2 (29.8)	0.4 (32.7)	2.9 (37.2)	6.5 (43.7)	11.5 (52.7)	16.0 (60.8)	16.5 (61.7)	12.9 (55.2)	8.0 (46.4)	4.2 (39.6)	1.6 (34.9)	6.6 (43.9)
Record low °C (°F)	−13.7 (7.3)	−19.4 (−2.9)	−10.3 (13.5)	−4.0 (24.8)	−1.3 (29.7)	4.2 (39.6)	8.2 (46.8)	7.7 (45.9)	4.2 (39.6)	−1.7 (28.9)	−8.3 (17.1)	−10.7 (12.7)	−19.4 (−2.9)
Source 1: 1991-2020 FMI normals
Source 2: Extremes 1995-present

== See also ==
- List of divided islands
  - Kataja
- Bogskär and Lågskär, other detached Finnish islands
- Utö, Finland
- Nuorgam
- Fort Blunder, an American fort mistakenly built in Canada
