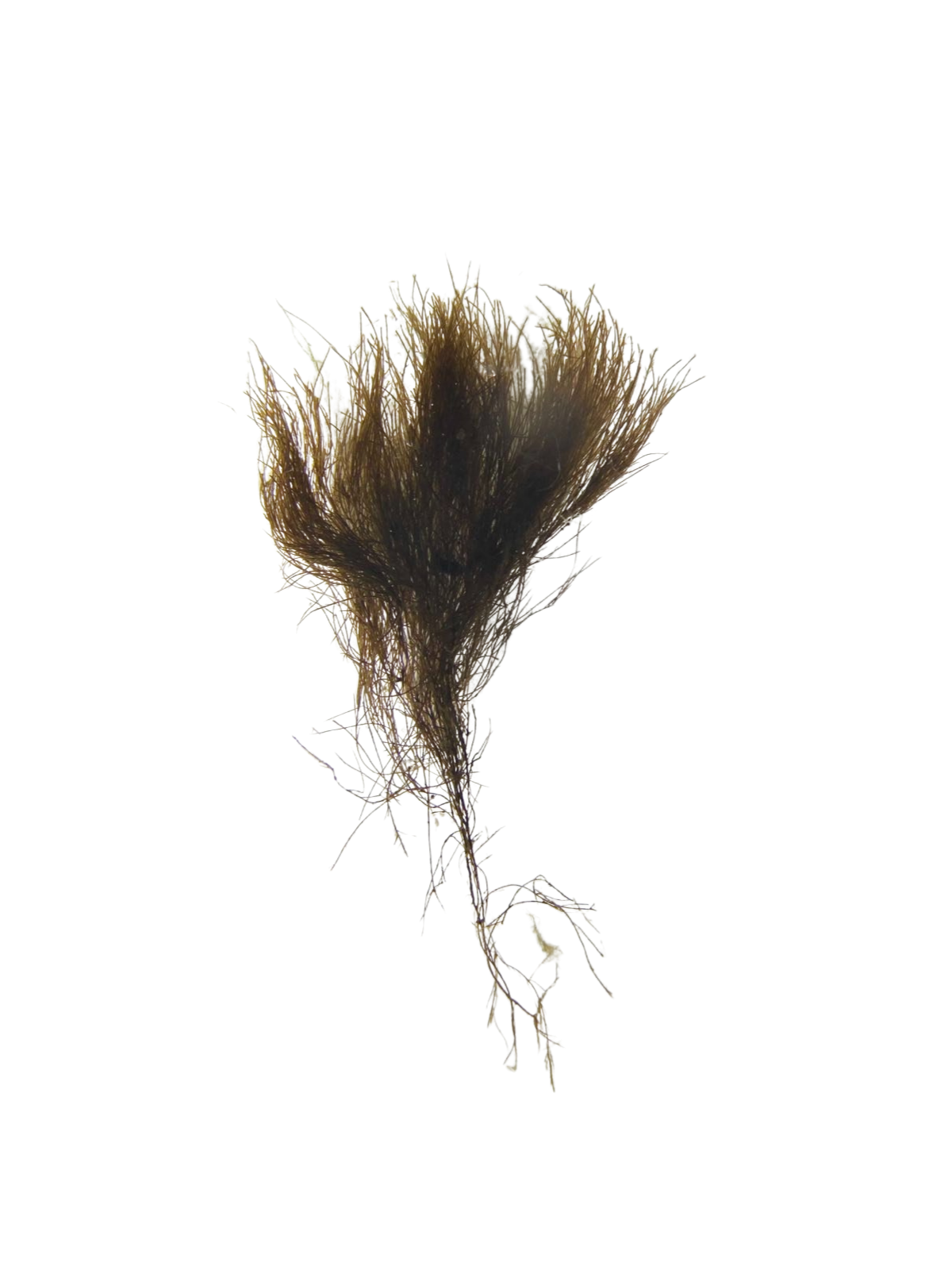
- Battersia arctica

Scientific classification
- Domain: Eukaryota
- Supergroup: Stramenopiles
- Division: Ochrophyta
- Class: Phaeophyceae
- Order: Sphacelariales
- Family: Sphacelariaceae
- Genus: Battersia; Reinke ex Batters, 1890

= Battersia =

Genus of algae

Battersia is a genus of algae belonging to the family Sphacelariaceae.

The genus name of Battersia is in honour of Edward Arthur Lionel Batters (1860–1907), an English botanist and author of "A catalogue of the British Marine algae" in 1902.

The species of this genus are found in Europe and Northern America.

Species known:

- Battersia arctica (Harv.) Draisma, Prud'homme & H.Kawai
- Battersia plumigera (Holmes ex Hauck) Draisma, Prud'homme & H.Kawai
