= Bogskär Lighthouse =

Bogskär Lighthouse Bogskär
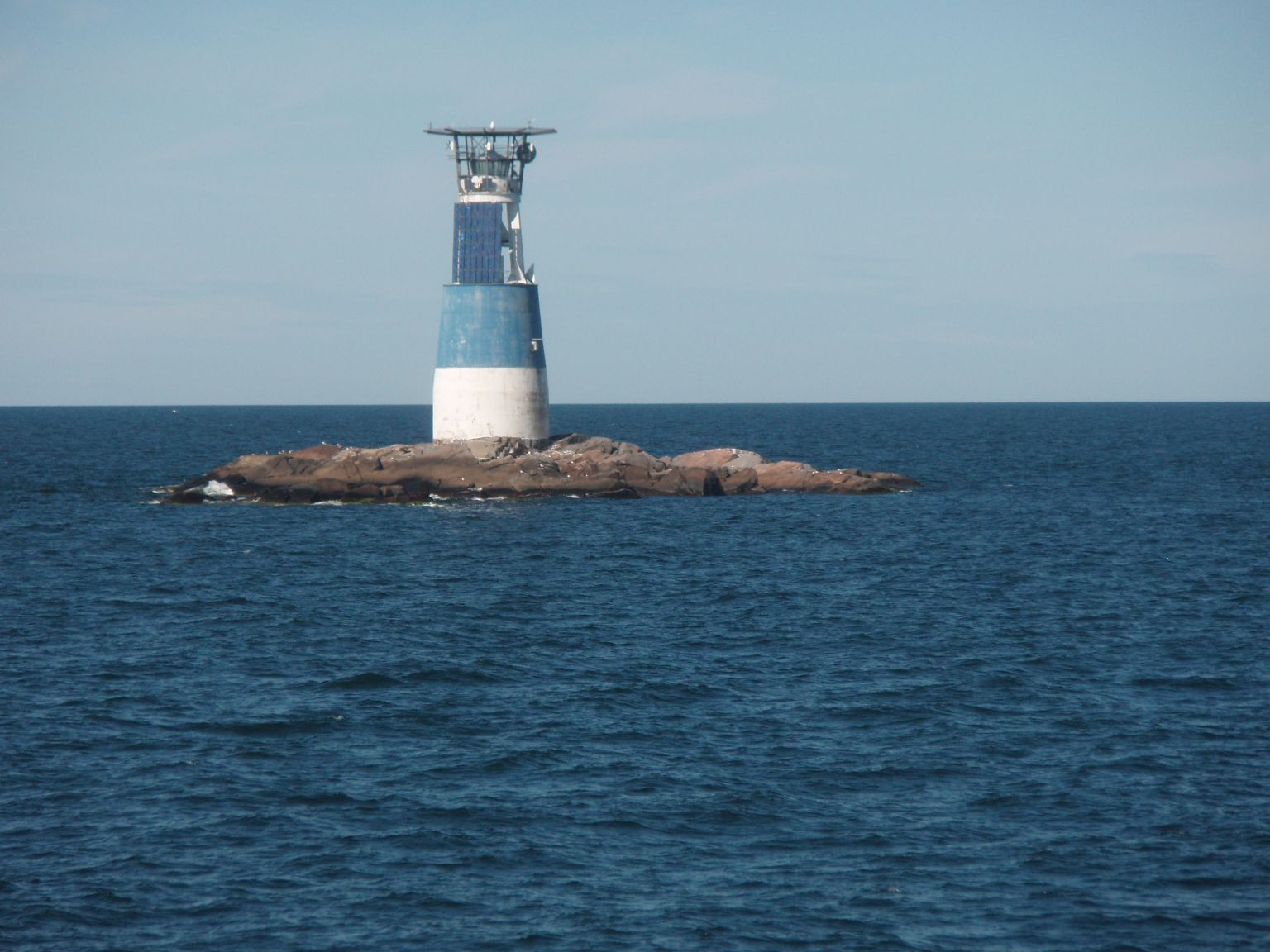
- The lighthouse of Bogskär
- Location: Bogskär; Baltic Sea; Finland
- Coordinates: 59°30′15.86″N 20°20′48.22″E

Tower
- Constructed: 1882
- Foundation: concrete base
- Construction: concrete tower (lower part) skeletal tower (upper part)
- Automated: 1922
- Height: 22 metres (72 ft)
- Shape: cylindrical tower (lower part) hexagonal prism with lantern and helipad (upper part)
- Markings: white and blue horizontal bands (lower part) white skeletal tower (upper part)
- Power source: acetylene, solar panel
- Racon: T

Light
- First lit: 29 August 1882
- Focal height: 28 metres (92 ft)
- Range: 9 nautical miles (17 km; 10 mi)
- Characteristic: Fl (3) W 20s.

Bogskär Lighthouse (Swedish: Bogskärs fyr) is located on the Bogskär skerries of Åland.

== History ==
The lighthouse was constructed in the 1870s and was completed in 1882, on Sweden's initiative. Of steel construction, it was erected on a three-metre granite plinth. The red-painted 25-metre-high (82 ft) lighthouse had seven floors.

The lighthouse had a crew of nine, of which half were occupying the lighthouse at a time.

The lighthouse was damaged in a storm during the winter of 1889. In an 1894 repair, it was strengthened and to add weight, the space between its inner and outer shells was filled in with concrete up to the third floor.

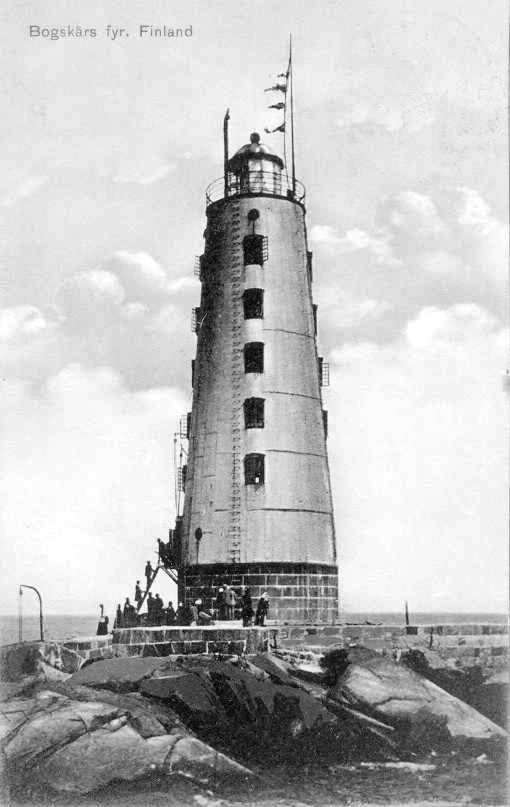
The old lighthouse 1882–1915.

In 1905, a wireless telegraph was installed, replacing the previous communication via light signals to passing ships.

In 1915 under the First World War, a German warship destroyed the original lighthouse.

A new automated lighthouse was constructed in 1922 on concrete pillars. The lighthouse was restored in 1981, when it was equipped with a helipad. The lighthouse is now painted blue-white and is solar-powered.

== See also ==
- List of lighthouses in Åland
- Suomen leijona
