= Flötjan Lighthouse =

Flötjan lighthouse Flötjan
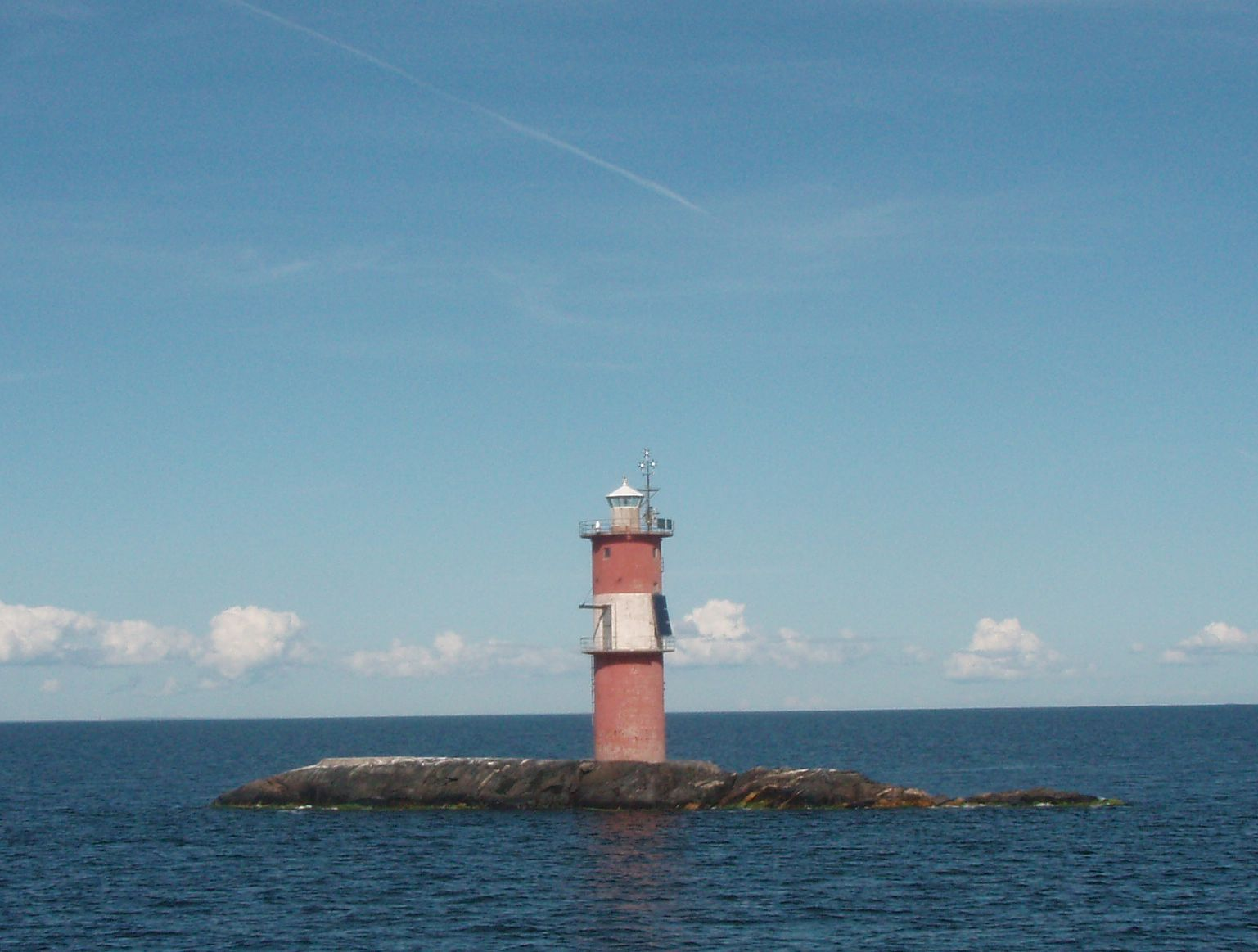
- Flötjan Lighthouse in 2009
- Location: Offshore 18 kilometres (11 mi) southwest of Mariehamn
- Coordinates: 59°48′30.3″N 19°46′55.6″E

Tower
- Constructed: 1908 (first)
- Foundation: rock and concrete base
- Construction: concrete tower
- Automated: 1959
- Height: 22 metres (72 ft)
- Shape: cylindrical tower with ouble balcony and lantern
- Markings: red tower with a white horizontal band, white lantern
- Power source: solar panel
- Racon: T

Light
- First lit: 1953 (current)
- Focal height: 26 metres (85 ft)
- Range: 10 nautical miles (19 km; 12 mi)
- Characteristic: Fl (2) W 20s.

Flötjan is a small rocky islet in Finland. It is located in the Åland Sea to the southwest of Lågskär. Depths near Flötjan measure approximately 180 metres (590 ft).

== Lighthouse ==
The original light was badly damaged during World War II. A concrete lighthouse tower was built in 1953 and automated in 1959. The light range is 28 kilometres (17 mi). The Stockholm-Mariehamn-Tallinn ferry passes just to the west of the island.

== See also ==
- List of lighthouses in Åland
