= Boundary Lake =

Lake in the US state of North Dakota and Canadian province of Manitobs

- Location of Lake Mattamuskeet in North Dakota, USA and Manitoba, Canada Boundary Lake (Manitoba) Boundary Lake (the United States) Boundary Lake (Canada)
- Location: Rural Municipality of Morton, Manitoba, Canada; Bottineau County, North Dakota, United States
- Coordinates: 48°59′42″N 100°12′36″W
- Basin countries: Canada, United States
- Surface elevation: 678 m (2,224 ft)

Boundary Lake is a small lake on the border between Canada and the United States, in the Canadian province of Manitoba and the American state of North Dakota. At 1.1 hectares (2.7 acres) its west island is one of the world's smallest land masses split by an international border.

== See also ==
- List of lakes of Manitoba
- List of lakes of North Dakota
