= Lågskär Lighthouse =

Lågskär lighthouse Lågskär
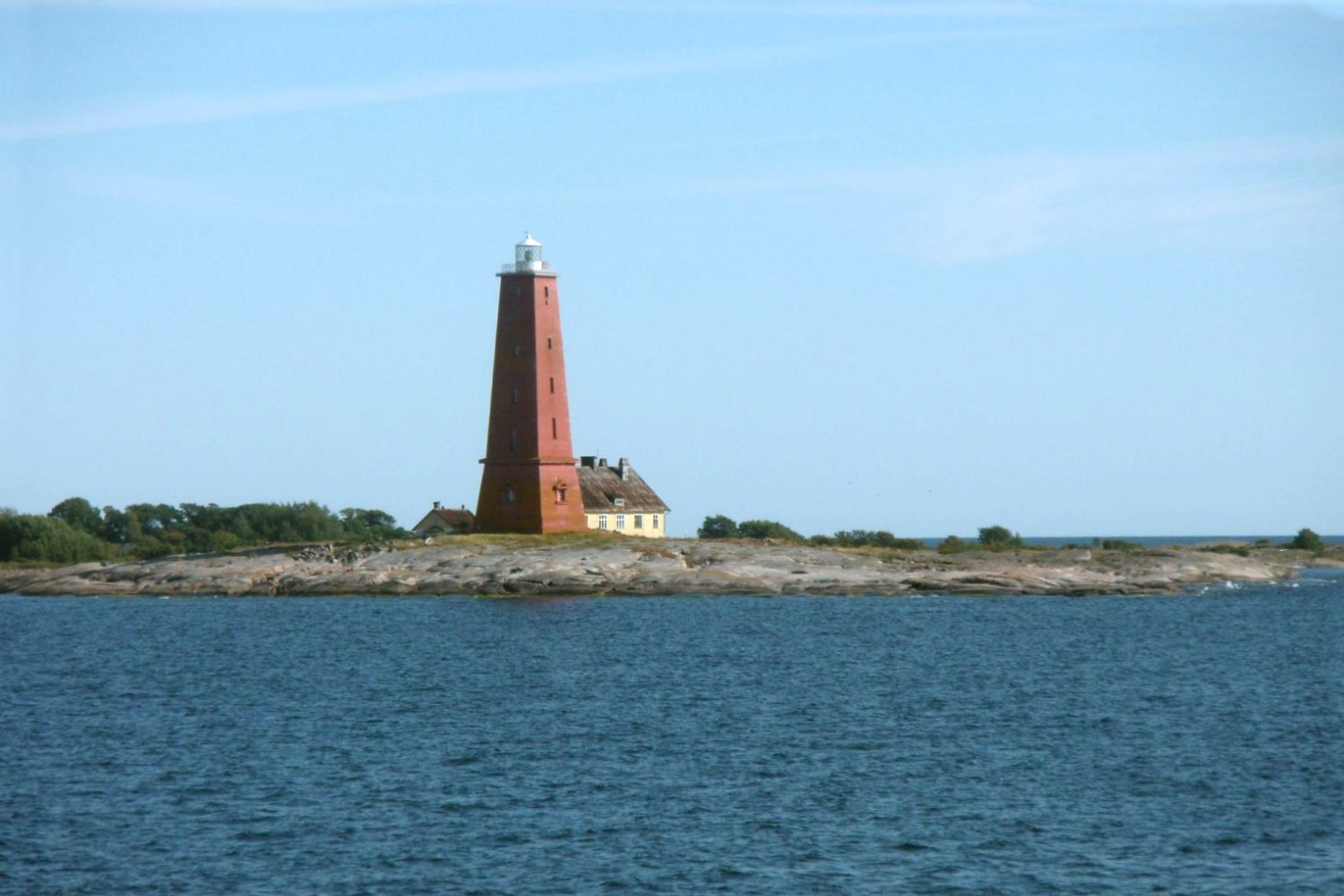
- Lågskär Lighthouse and outbuildings (2009)
- Location: Lågskär Island; Åland; Finland
- Coordinates: 59°50′28.2″N 19°54′43.9″E

Tower
- Constructed: 1840 (first)
- Foundation: masonry
- Construction: reinforced concrete
- Automated: 1961
- Height: 23 metres (75 ft)
- Shape: square tower with balcony and lantern
- Markings: red tower, white lantern
- Power source: acetylene, wind turbine

Light
- First lit: 1920 (current); 1859 (second)
- Focal height: 42 metres (138 ft)
- Range: 11 nautical miles (20 km; 13 mi)
- Characteristic: Fl W 12s.

Lågskär Lighthouse is an automated lighthouse located on the north side of Lågskär, one of Finland's Åland in the Sea of Åland of the Baltic. It is the only striking feature on Lågskär, a generally uninhabited island.

The 23-metre (75 ft) lighthouse is designed as a concrete tower, square in shape, with a lantern and gallery. The lens has a focal plane of 42 metres (138 ft) with white light flashing every 12 seconds. The light has run on wind power since 1986. While the ground floor of the site is open, the tower itself is closed. It is maintained by the Finnish Maritime Administration, and the buildings are often let out to ornithologists studying on the island.

== History ==
A wooden lighthouse was built in 1840 on northwestern tip of the island and was rebuilt in 1859 as a masonry structure. During World War I, it was destroyed by Russian bombardment. A temporary structure was erected thereafter. The present lighthouse was constructed in 1920. It introduced a rotating gas lighting device, which was the first of its kind in the world.

There is a commemorative postage stamp of the Lågskär Lighthouse, part of Åland's "Lighthouses series", with a denomination of 2.10 Finnish markka (fm). It was issued on 8 May 1992 and remained valid until 30 June 2002.

== Architecture and features ==
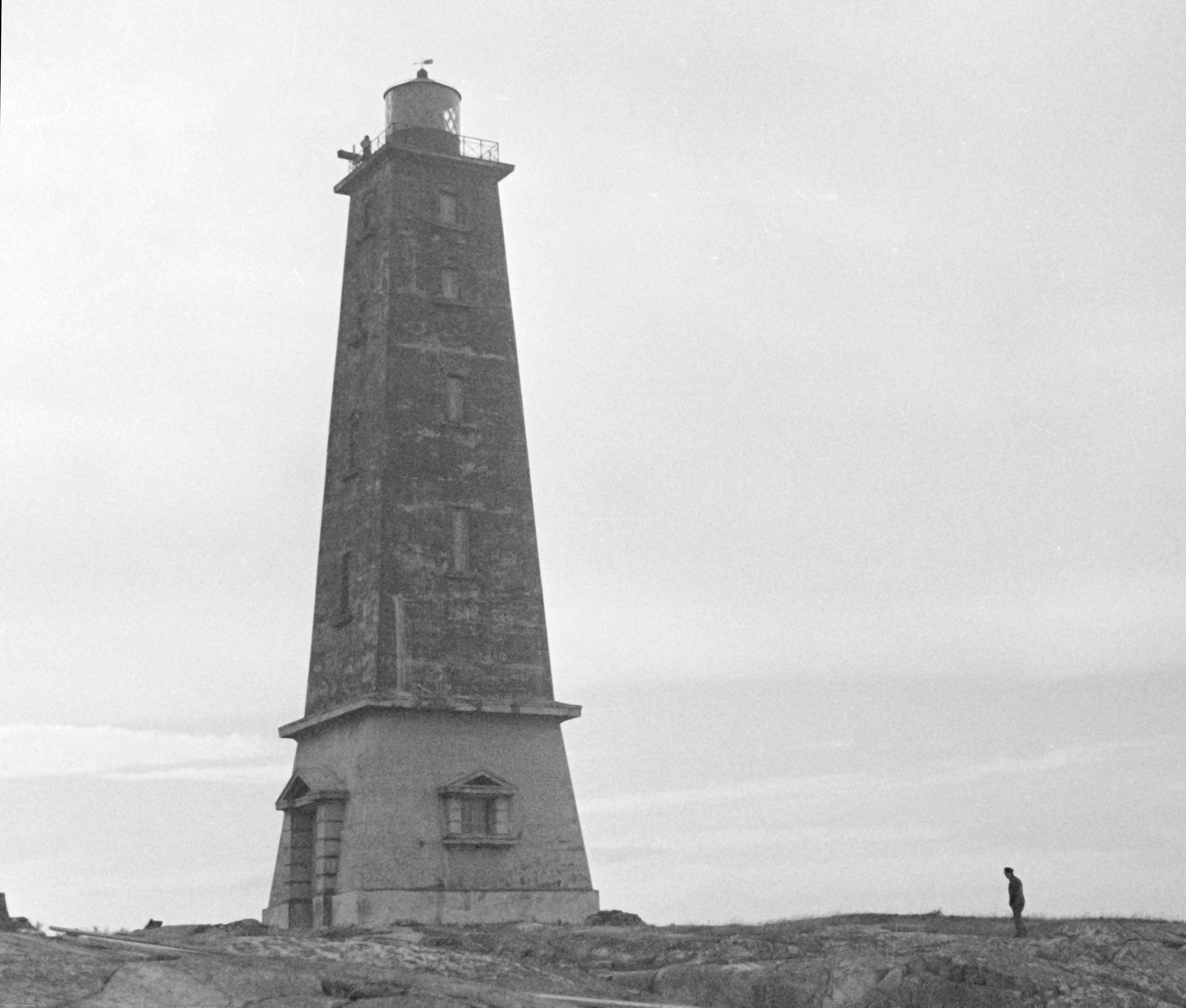
Lågskär Lighthouse (c. 1939–1945)

The 23-metre (75 ft) light is designed as a concrete tower, square in shape, with a lantern and gallery. The tower is painted red and the lantern white. There is also a 1 1/2-storey keeper's house and other light station buildings. It is a functional navigational guide and has a range of 11 nautical miles (20 km; 13 mi). The lens has a focal plane of 42 metres (138 ft) with white light flashing every 12 seconds. The lighthouse has run on wind power since 1986. Since automation, the outbuildings and the tower have been used as an ornithological station.

== See also ==
- List of lighthouses in Åland
