= Kataja =

Island shared between Sweden and Finland

Inakari
- Interactive map of Kataja

Geography
- Location: Baltic Sea
- Coordinates: 65.70105°N 24.16630°E
- Area: 0.71 km^{2} (0.27 sq mi)
- Length: 2 km (1.2 mi)
- Width: 0.35 km (0.217 mi)

Administration
- Finland
- Region: Lapland
- Sweden
- County: Norrbotten County

Demographics
- Population: 0

Kataja is an islet south of Haparanda in Norrbotten. It is the easternmost point of Sweden and it is part of the Haparanda archipelago. The islet has an area of 71 hectares (180 acres). It is about 2 kilometres (1.2 mi) long and 200 to 500 metres (660 to 1,640 ft) wide.

The name "Kataja" is Finnish for juniper. The island is divided between Sweden and Finland. The border was established in 1809 between two islands, a larger Swedish one called Kataja and a smaller Finnish one called Inakari. In the years since then, post-glacial rebound has caused the land in the region to rise relative to sea level, joining the two islands. The border now crosses the southeastern part of the combined island, and is marked by two national cairns. The border on the island is around 420 metres (1,380 ft) long.

Kataja's beaches are mostly boulders with some sand. The eastern peninsula is covered in deciduous trees such as rowan, alder and willow, while the remainder is covered by coniferous trees.

== See also ==
- Märket
- List of divided islands
