= Sphacelaria =

Scientific classification
- Domain: Eukaryota
- Clade: Sar
- Clade: Stramenopiles
- Division: Ochrophyta
- Class: Phaeophyceae
- Order: Sphacelariales
- Family: Sphacelariaceae
- Genus: Sphacelaria; H.C.Lyngbye, 1818

Genus of brown algae

Sphacelaria is a genus of brown macroalgae (or seaweed) in the family Sphacelariaceae.

== Taxonomy and nomenclature ==
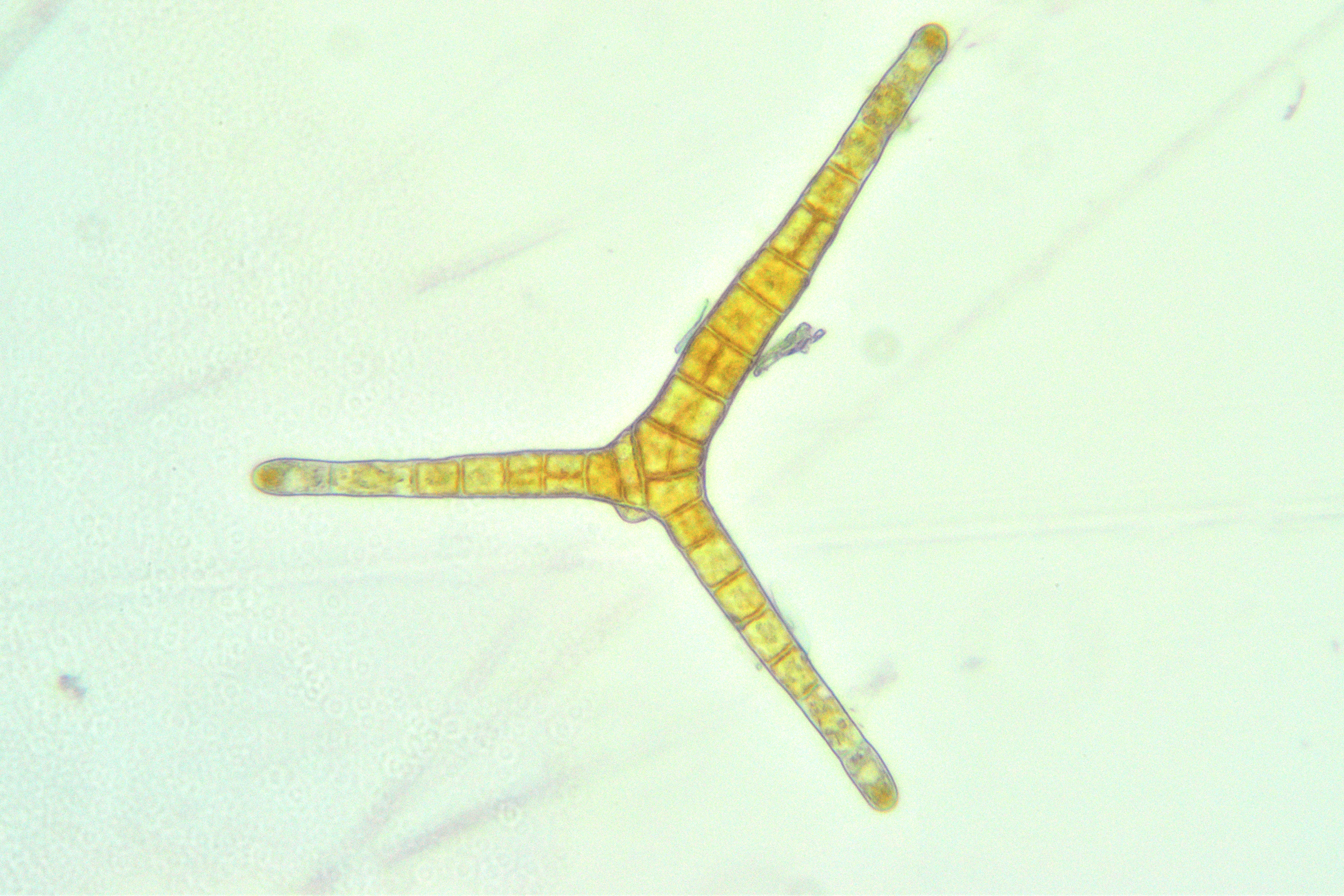
An example of Sphacelaria propagule.

The genus and its type species (Sphacelaria reticulata) were briefly described by Hans Christian Lyngbye in Florae Danicae in 1818. At the time of publication, such brief descriptions were considered to be valid by virtue of descriptio generico-specifica; Lyngbye immediately added nine more species to the genus in 1819. Recent studies, however have revealed that this genus is polyphyletic, with the type species forming a separate clade with from the rest of the genus—in addition, it was also observed that S. reticulata does not exhibit the key morphological characteristics of the genus. Thus, it has been proposed to change the type species into S. cirrosa, one of the most widespread species, to conserve the genus name. Dr. Willem F. Prud’homme van Reine (1941–2020) was the foremost expert on Sphacelaria taxonomy and has contributed to the clarification and naming of the 37 confirmed species.

== Morphology ==
Sphacelaria is mainly characterized by the blackening of their cell walls when treated with bleach, polystichous (parenchymatous) filamentous thallus, hemiblastic branching (i.e. laterals arise from the secondary), and leptocaulus growth (i.e. uniform size of filaments, such as their mature segments have almost the same diameter as their apical ones); moreover majority of the species also have specialized branchlets for vegetative reproduction called propagules. Delineation of Sphacelaria species have been traditionally based on morphological differences, especially the variation among the propagule shape, cell dimensions, and cell arrangement of the propagules. In terms of cellular ultrastructure, Sphacelaria cells contain discoid chloroplasts and do not have pyrenoids.

== Distribution ==
Sphacelaria is a cosmopolitan genus with a majority of the species found in temperate regions but representatives also thrive in the tropics up to the arctic and antarctic areas. Species from this genus are mainly marine, however, freshwater species have been found in USA (S. lacustris) and China (S. fluviatilis).

== Ecology ==
Sphacelaria species are epiphytic and/or epilithic in nature, they form filamentous tufts or mats on the surfaces they have reclaimed and are normally found on the intertidal to shallow subtidal.

== Life history ==
Members of this genus exhibit isomorphic (i.e., the gametophyte (N) and sporophyte (2N) stage are morphologically similar) and diplohaplontic [i.e., both gametophyte (N) and sporophyte (2N) generations are free-living and equally distinct bodies but only differ in chromosome number and strategy] life cycle with isogamy (i.e., gametes with the same size and form) or anisogamy (i.e., gametes with different size and form). Culture studies have revealed that the reproductive strategy of Sphacelaria species are mainly dictated by the temperature, wherein propagule formation is favored during warmer seasons while sexual reproduction (i.e., formation of plurilocular and unilocular gametangia /zoidangia) occur when temperatures drop; in addition, daylength exposure is believed to contribute to the production of propagules and consequent inhibition of gametogenesis.

== Exploitation, harvesting and cultivation ==
This genus is neither commercially nor traditionally cultivated and harvested.

== Chemical composition and natural products chemistry ==
Sphacelaria has been known to contain several natural products such as carotene, chlorophyll a, and fucoxanthin (the pigment responsible for the brown color of phaeophycean seaweeds). Furthermore, they also contain sulfated polysaccharides in the form of xylogalactofucan and alginic acid which have shown to have antiviral properties against the herpes simplex virus type 1 (HSV-1).

== Utilization and management ==
This genus has been used for plant morphogenesis studies, environmental stressors research, and much of the industry interest on Sphacelaria revolves around its easy protoplast production which has implications in cellular studies involving expression profiling, RNA sequencing, and transcriptomics.
