= Lågskär =

Island in Åland Islands, Finland

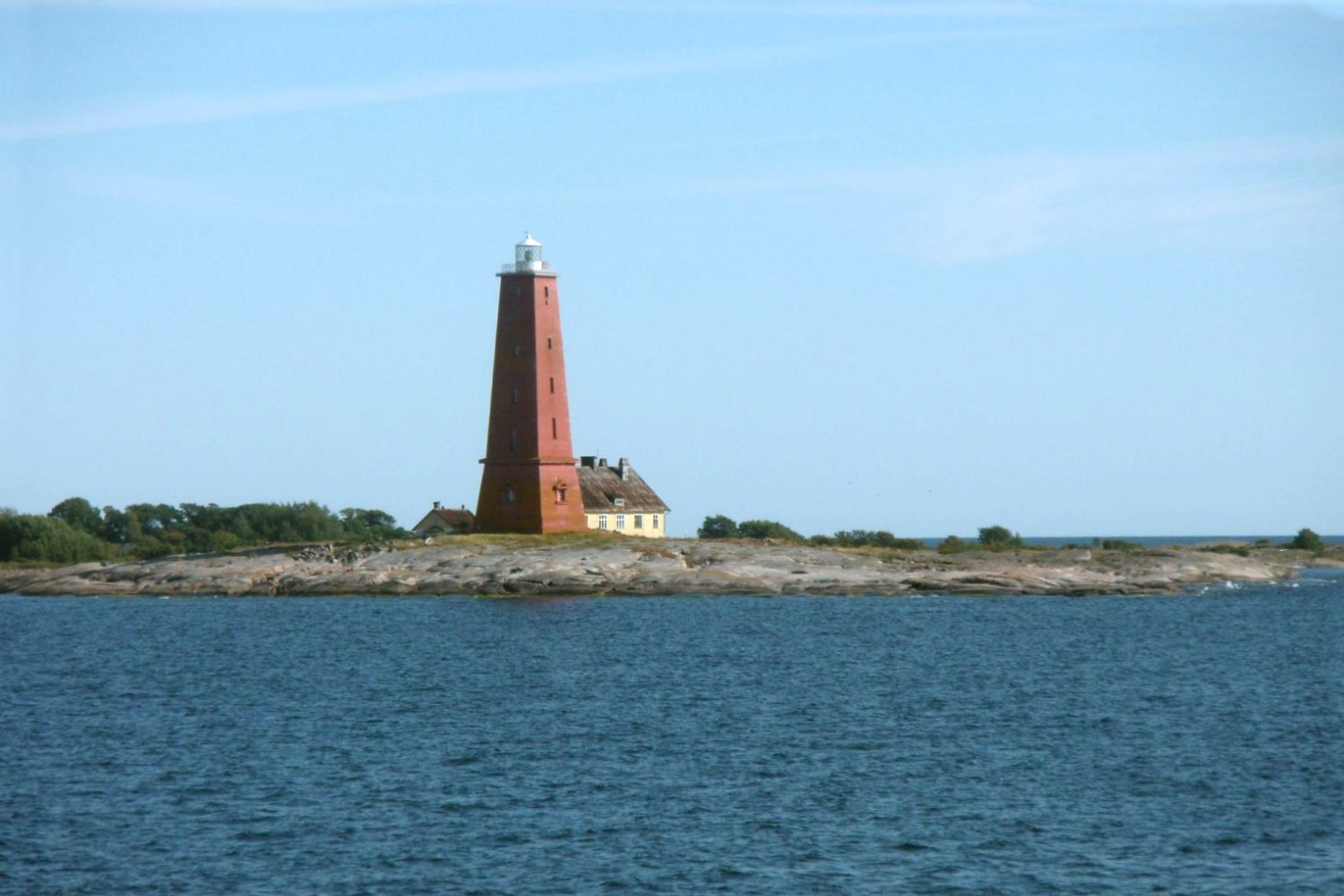
- Lighthouse on Lågskär island

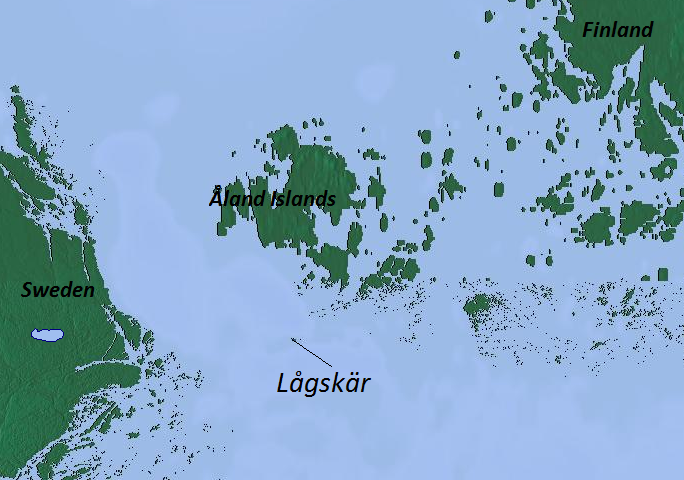
- Location of Lågskär

Geography
- Coordinates: 59.8416°N 19.9166°E
- Area: 0.61 km^{2} (0.24 sq mi)

Administration
- Finland
- Island: Åland

Demographics
- Population: 0
- Languages: Swedish

Ramsar Wetland
- Official name: Björkör and Lågskär Archipelago
- Designated: 28 May 1974
- Reference no.: 4

Lågskär (Swedish for "low skerry") is a small island within the Åland archipelago of Finland. It belongs to the municipality of Lemland. It is situated about 24 kilometres (15 mi) south of Mariehamn in the Baltic's Sea of Åland. The main island of Lågskär measures 61 hectares (150 acres) in area. Rock stacks, sea cliffs and rocky shores are found along the coastline of the island. As a breeding ground for waterfowl, Lågskär has the status of an Important Bird Area (IBA) and is frequented by ornithologists who use the Lågskär Lighthouse buildings during their stay. In the past, several vessels have sunk off the coast.

== History ==
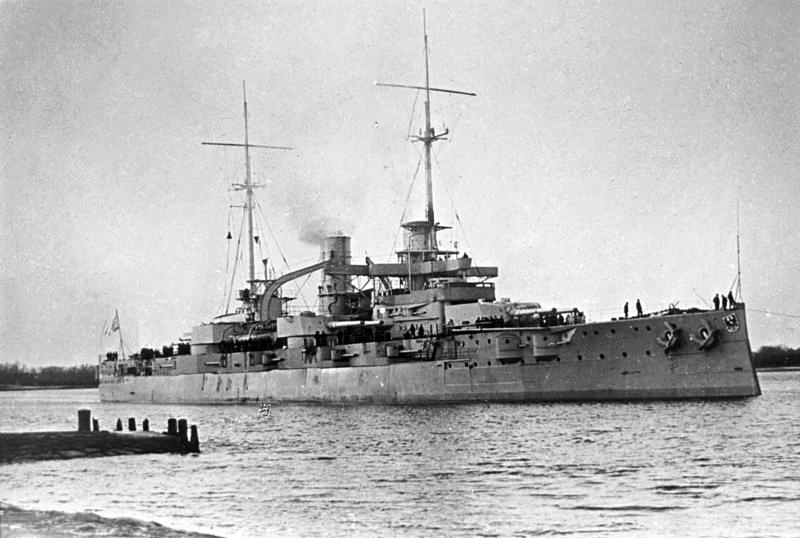
SMS Rheinland which ran aground in heavy fog here during World War I

The earliest habitation on the island was linked to a cairn and a wooden beacon that existed on the island during the 1600s and 1700s. In the 1840s, when the first lighthouse was constructed to replace the beacon, there were 20–30 inhabitants comprising the families of the lighthouse keepers. In addition to rearing livestock, fishing, and hunting wildlife, the families ran a school for their children; a lighthouse society functioned at the time. The wooden lighthouse was remodeled into a stone structure which was destroyed during World War I. The existing lighthouse, built in 1920, introduced a rotating gas lighting device, noted as the first of its kind in the world. After the lighthouse was automated in 1961, the lighthouse keepers vacated the island. It is uninhabited since.

On 11 April 1918, the German Nassau-class battleship SMS Rheinland ran aground in heavy fog during World War I. In 1934 or 1935, the German vessel Frida sprang a leak and sank off Lågskär, but the crew survived. On the evening of 21 October 1942, Finnish submarine Vesihiisi torpedoed and sank the Soviet S-class submarine S-7 near Lågskär.

== Geography ==
The island comprises a mix of greenery and rocky areas, with the thickest vegetation towards the centre. Rock stacks, sea cliffs and rocky shores are found along the coastline. There is a small sandy beach at the north west side. Near the island, particularly to the south, there are rocky islets and rocks, including Sundbloms Grund, Söderkläppen and Österkläppen. To the east are Kalvskär and Norra Kalvskär.

Wetlands International has identified the island as a wetland. The Middle Åland Sill, one of three sills in the two basins of the Åland Sea, measuring 70 metres (230 ft) width, is situated between Söderarm and Lågskär and separates the two basins of the Åland Islands.

== Nature and wildlife ==
The Björkör-Lågskär area, measuring 6,097 hectares (15,070 acres) in size, is part of a Ramsar Site, while the Nyhamn-Lågskär islands area, measuring 2,879 hectares (7,110 acres) in size, is recognized as an Important Bird Area (IBA) since 2000. A Birds Directive designation for 1,079 hectares (2,670 acres) overlaps the IBA site.

Lågskär is occasionally visited by ornithologists for birdwatching, and to operate a bird ringing station which was established in 1964. They use the abandoned buildings during their stay. The island has been identified by Alula, the Finnish birding magazine, as “one of the most important breeding bird islands of the Finnish Baltic Sea”. On the island are Steller's eider (Polysticta stelleri), the key bird species, and razorbill (Alca torda). Other breeding species recorded are: Mute swan (Cygnus olor), greylag goose (Anser anser), tufted duck (Aythya fuligula), gadwall (Anas strepera), black guillemot (Cepphus grylle), razorbill (Alca torda), guillemot (Uria aalge), water rail (Rallus aquaticus), colonies of gulls (Larus spp.), terns (Sterna spp.) and the white-tailed eagle (Haliaeetus albicilla).

Despite harsh conditions, the vegetation on the island is fairly diverse. Following the island's grazing ban, vegetation has become very thick and has resulted in it becoming a breeding ground for waterfowl. There is large reed bed in the small lagoon area.

Fish species reported in the late 19th century in a small rock pool of 9 by 4 metres (30 ft × 13 ft) in size continue to flourish. Carassius carassius of lengths varying between 8.7–11.7 centimetres (3.4–4.6 in) is found along the coastline, and in a 1993 study, some 18 species of macroalgae were recorded at depths varying between 4–7 metres (13–23 ft). The species reported include Pilayella littoralis, Ectocarpus siliculosus, Fucus vesiculosus, and Rhodomela confervoides, followed by a lesser number of Sphacelaria arctica, Cladophora rupestris, Stictyosiphon tortilis and Polysiphonia fucoides than in a previous 1950s study.
