= Bogskär =

Finnish group of islets

Coordinates: 59°30′03″N 20°02′13″E

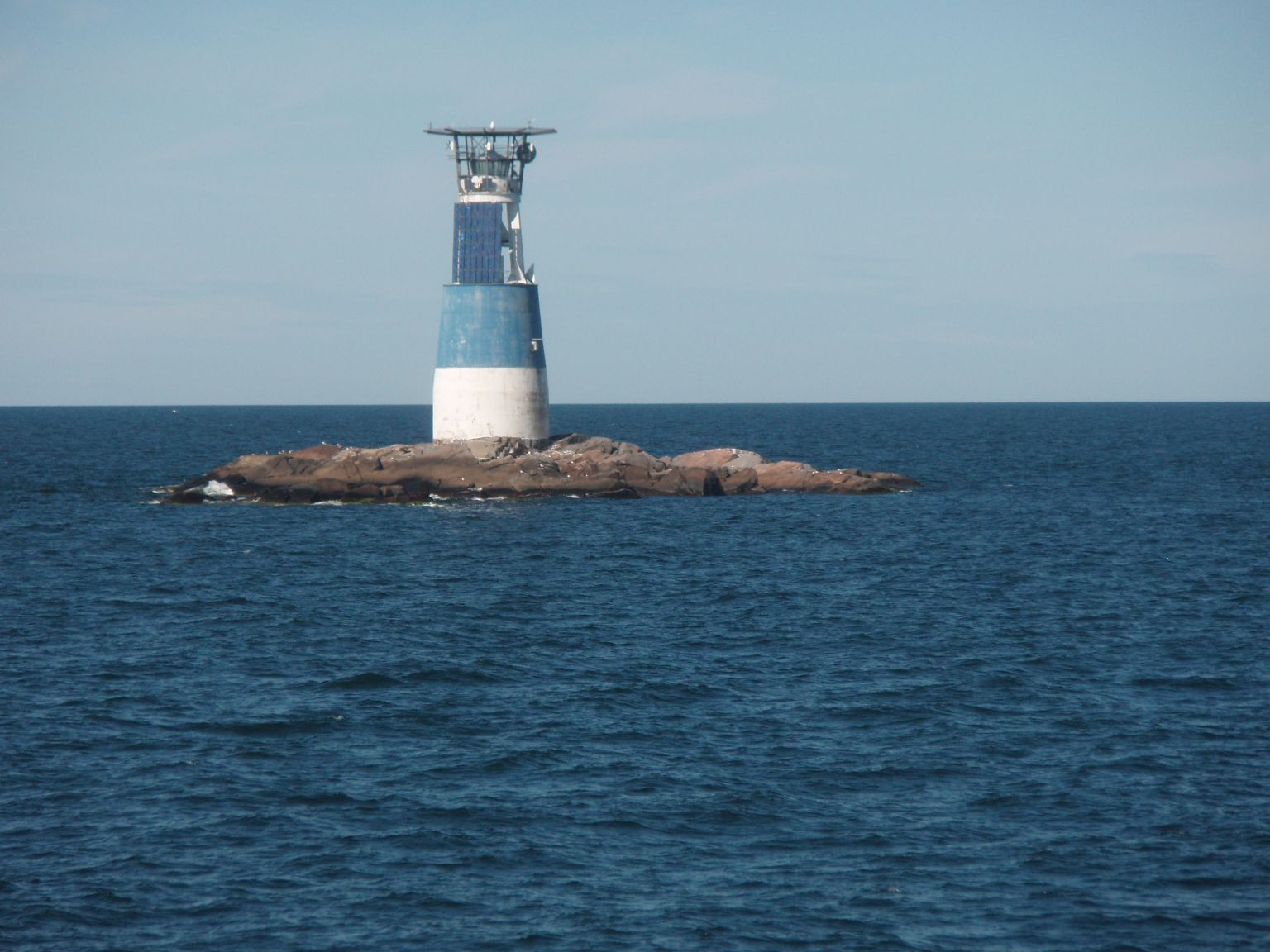
The lighthouse of Bogskär

Bogskär is a small group of Baltic Sea islets off the southernmost tip of Finland. It is Finland's southernmost land and governed by the municipality of Kökar in Åland. The islets are remote: the distance to the nearest large islands in Kökar, Föglö and Lemland is over 50 kilometres (31 mi).

Bogskär is so remote that it is located outside the internal waters of Finland, and has its own, separate internal waters. Up to 1995, even its territorial waters were separate from the rest of Finland. When the territorial waters were expanded from a limit of 4 nautical miles (7.4 km; 4.6 mi) to 12 nautical miles (22 km; 14 mi), the territorials waters merged. Even today, territorial waters extend only 3 nautical miles (5.6 km; 3.5 mi) south of Bogskär.

== Climate ==
Bogskär has an oceanic climate (Cfb) with strong influence from the Baltic Sea.

Climate data for Kökar Bogskär (1984–2023, extremes 1996–2025)
Month	Jan	Feb	Mar	Apr	May	Jun	Jul	Aug	Sep	Oct	Nov	Dec	Year
Record high °C (°F)	8.3 (46.9)	8.2 (46.8)	12.1 (53.8)	17.4 (63.3)	20.7 (69.3)	24.1 (75.4)	26.5 (79.7)	24.5 (76.1)	21.3 (70.3)	16.4 (61.5)	12.9 (55.2)	9.5 (49.1)	26.5 (79.7)
Daily mean °C (°F)	0.6 (33.1)	0.0 (32.0)	0.5 (32.9)	3.5 (38.3)	7.6 (45.7)	13.4 (56.1)	16.6 (61.9)	16.8 (62.2)	13.2 (55.8)	8.9 (48.0)	4.8 (40.6)	2.3 (36.1)	7.4 (45.2)
Record low °C (°F)	−16.0 (3.2)	−15.6 (3.9)	−10.2 (13.6)	−4.8 (23.4)	−0.2 (31.6)	5.0 (41.0)	7.5 (45.5)	9.0 (48.2)	5.3 (41.5)	−1.8 (28.8)	−7.6 (18.3)	−11.0 (12.2)	−16.0 (3.2)
Source: FMI open data

== See also ==
- Bogskär Lighthouse
