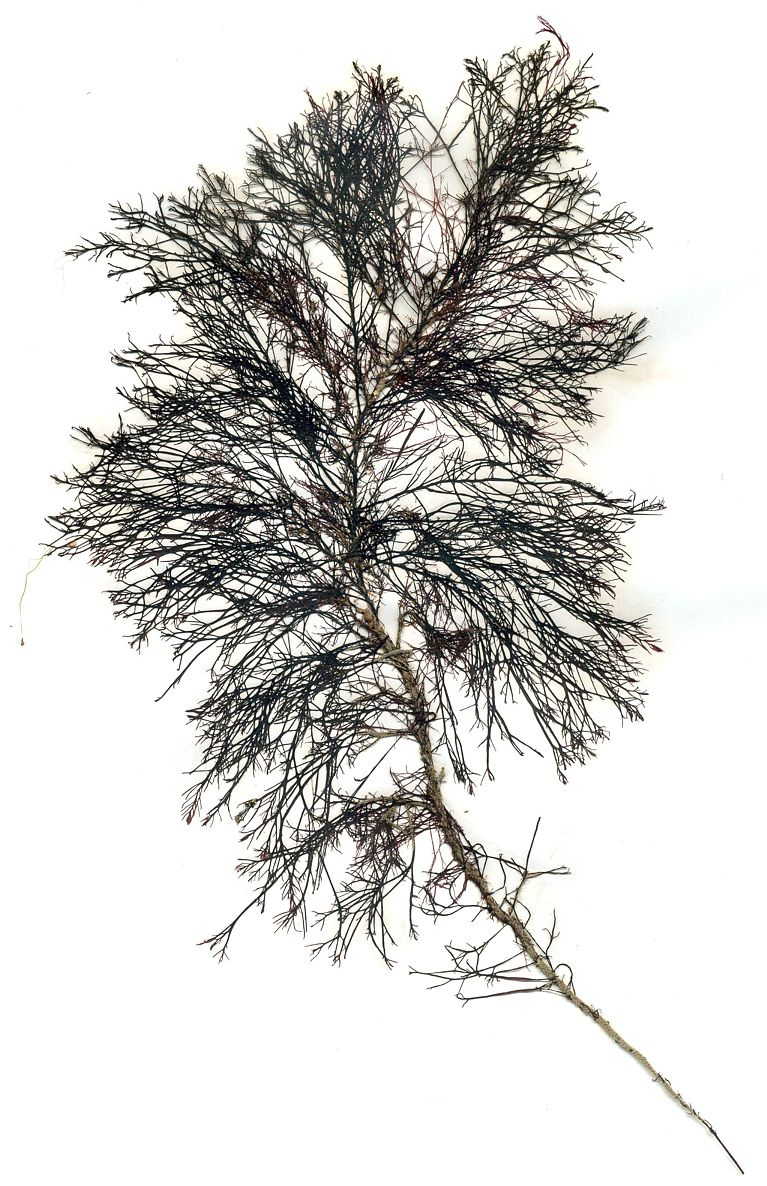

Scientific classification
- Clade: Archaeplastida
- Division: Rhodophyta
- Class: Florideophyceae
- Order: Ceramiales
- Family: Rhodomelaceae
- Genus: Rhodomela
- Species: R. confervoides

Binomial name
- Rhodomela confervoides (Hudson) P.C.Silva, 1952

= Rhodomela confervoides =

Species of alga

Rhodomela confervoides is a species of alga belonging to the family Rhodomelaceae.

It has cosmopolitan distribution.
