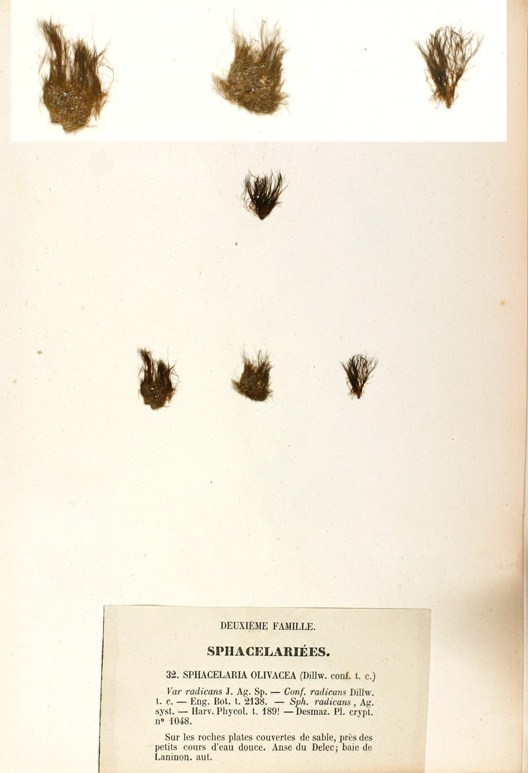
- Sphacelaria radicans

Scientific classification
- Domain: Eukaryota
- Clade: Diaphoretickes
- Clade: SAR
- Clade: Stramenopiles
- Phylum: Gyrista
- Subphylum: Ochrophytina
- Class: Phaeophyceae
- Order: Sphacelariales
- Family: Sphacelariaceae

= Sphacelariaceae =

Family of algae

Sphacelariaceae is a family of algae belonging to the order Sphacelariales.

Genera:

- Battersia Reinke ex Batters, 1890
- Chaetopteris Kützing, 1843
- Herpodiscus G.R.South, 1974
- Onslowia
- Sphacelaria Lyngbye, 1818
- Sphacella Reinke, 1890
- Sphacelorbus Draisma, Prud'homme & H.Kawai, 2010
