= Suomen leijona =

Finnish lion Suomen Leijona
- Location: Scandinavia
- Coordinates: 59°28′22″N 20°48′47″E

Tower
- Constructed: 1987
- Built by: Mauri Määtänen
- Construction: steel
- Markings: white, black
- Power source: solar cell panel

Light
- Focal height: 22.7 m (74 ft)
- Range: 16.2 nmi (30.0 km; 18.6 mi)
- Characteristic: Fl W 12s
- Modern light
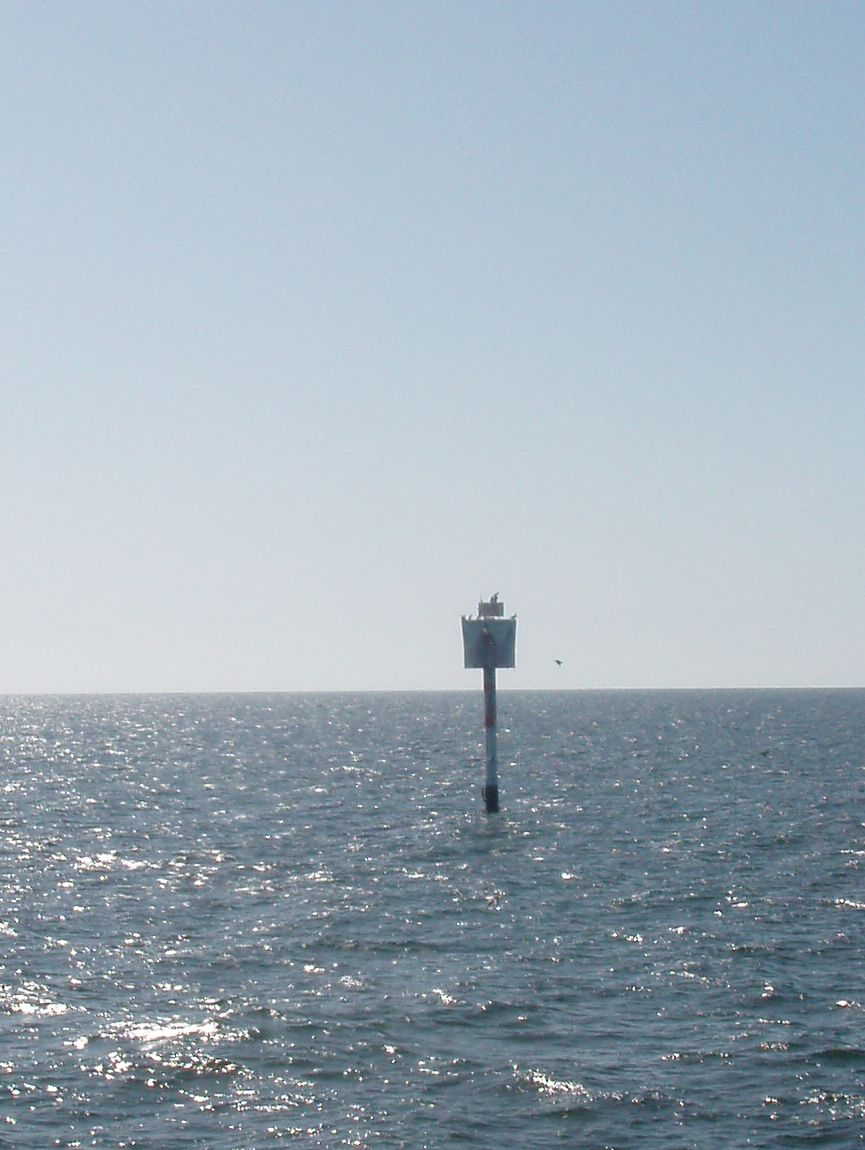
- Constructed: 2005
- Foundation: concrete
- Construction: steel, fitted with a light, radar reflector and radio beacon powered by a wind generator
- Height: 13 m (43 ft)
- Shape: columnar
- Markings: white tower, orange band
- Racon: D
- Focal height: 13.3 m (44 ft)
- Range: 9 nmi (17 km; 10 mi) light, 12 nmi (22 km; 14 mi) RACON
- Characteristic: Fl(2) W 12s

Suomen leijona (Swedish: Finlands lejon), The Lion of Finland, is a marker light and radio beacon in the Northern Baltic Sea operated by the Finnish Maritime Administration, located approximately 46 km (25 nmi; 29 mi) Southwest of the island of Utö, six kilometers outside the Finnish territorial waters but inside the country's exclusive economic zone.

== Suomen leijona lighthouse ==
The original Suomen leijona (Swedish: Finlands lejon), The Lion of Finland, was a caisson lighthouse; a steel tower resting on a concrete caisson, equipped with a helicopter platform and powered by a wind generator. The lighthouse had a futuristic design with a helipad on the top of a downward tapering tower, which made great demands on the foundation and the bottom of the tower. In 1992 it was discovered that the foundation had been under-mined and that the lighthouse was threatening to collapse. The problem was remedied by filling with rubble, but the problem recurred in 2004. Deemed too dangerous to repair the lighthouse, it was demolished in 2005 and replaced by the much smaller, marker light / radio beacon.
