= Stictyosiphon tortilis =

Scientific classification
- Domain: Eukaryota
- Clade: Diaphoretickes
- Clade: SAR
- Clade: Stramenopiles
- Phylum: Gyrista
- Subphylum: Ochrophytina
- Class: Phaeophyceae
- Order: Ectocarpales
- Family: Chordariaceae
- Genus: Stictyosiphon
- Species: S. tortilis

Binomial name
- Stictyosiphon tortilis (Gobi) Reinke, 1889

Species of seaweed

Stictyosiphon tortilis is a species of alga belonging to the family Chordariaceae.

Synonym:

- Dictyosiphon tortilis (= basionym)
- Phloeospora tortilis (Gobi) Areschoug 1876
- Scytosiphon tortilis Ruprecht 1850
- Phloeospora pumila Kjellman 1877
