= Koiluoto =

Island divided between Finland and Russia

- Interactive map of Koiluoto

Geography
- Location: Baltic Sea
- Coordinates: 60.50575°N 27.772472°E
- Area: 0.03 km^{2} (0.012 sq mi)
- Length: 0.2 km (0.12 mi)
- Width: 0.11 km (0.068 mi)

Administration
- Finland
- Province: Kymenlaakso
- Municipality: Virolahti
- Russia
- Federation subject: Leningrad Oblast
- District: Vyborgsky District

Demographics
- Population: 0

Koiluoto (Cyrill. Russian: Койлуото) is an island in the Bay of Virolahti of the Gulf of Finland. It is divided by the border between Russia and Finland.

It is roughly 200 metres (660 ft) long and 110 metres (360 ft) wide.

On both sides, the island is part of the border zone and is off-limits to the general public.
