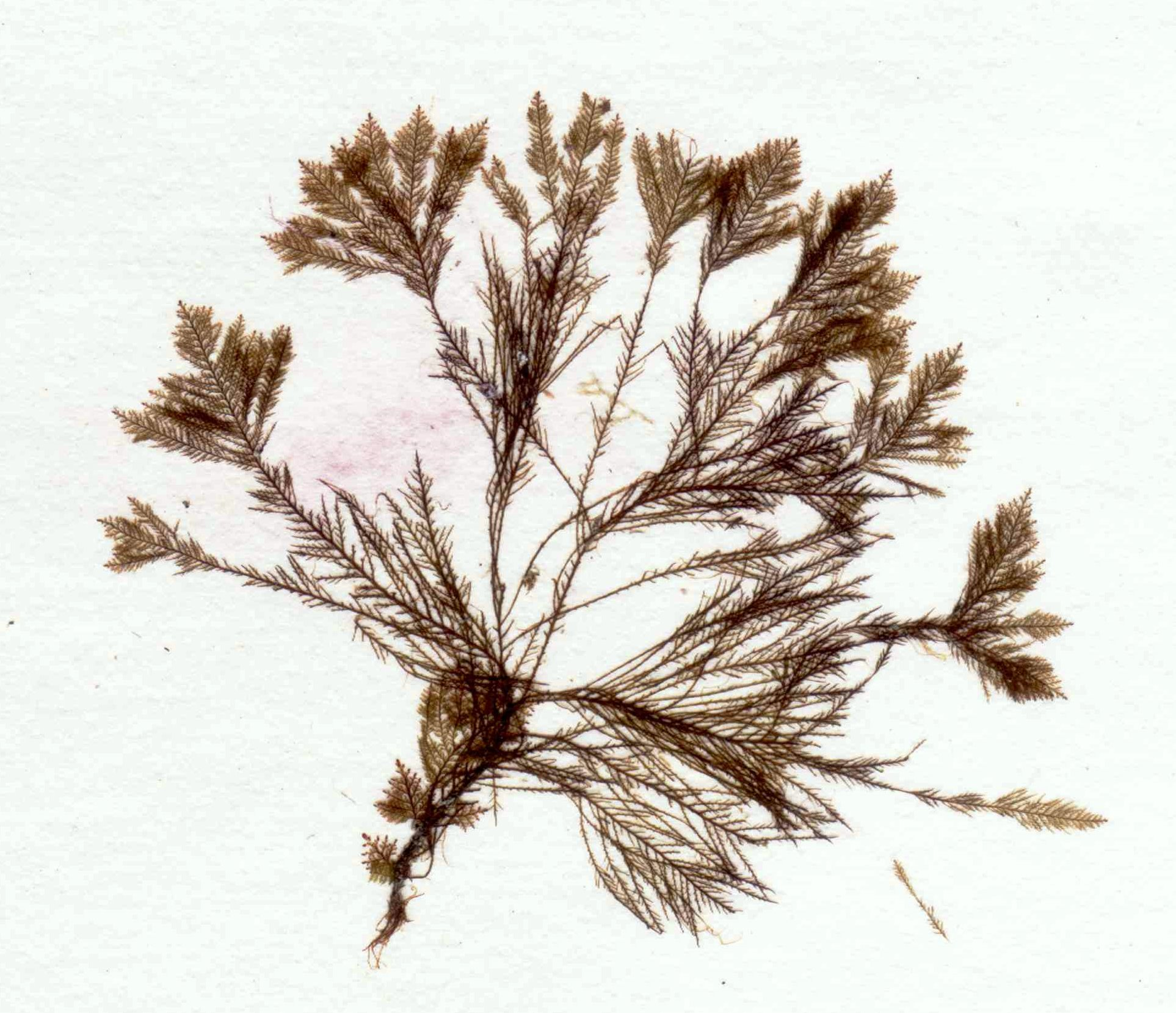
- Halopteris filicina

Scientific classification
- Domain: Eukaryota
- Clade: Diaphoretickes
- Clade: SAR
- Clade: Stramenopiles
- Phylum: Gyrista
- Subphylum: Ochrophytina
- Class: Phaeophyceae
- Subclass: Dictyotophycidae
- Order: Sphacelariales; Migula

Families
- Cladostephaceae; Lithodermataceae; Phaeostrophiaceae; Sphacelariaceae; Sphacelodermaceae; Stypocaulaceae

= Sphacelariales =

Order of algae

Sphacelariales is an order of brown algae (class Phaeophyceae).
